= 2020 New Hampshire House of Representatives election =

New Hampshire House of Representatives election, 2020
- November 3, 2020

All 400 seats in the New Hampshire House of Representatives 201 seats needed for a majority

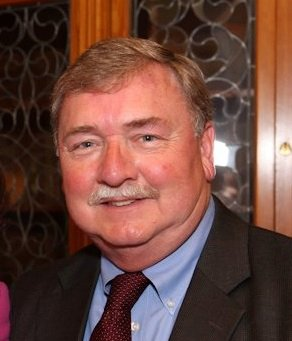
| | Majority party | Minority party |
|---|---|---|
| Leader | Dick Hinch | Steve Shurtleff |
| Party | Republican | Democratic |
| Leader's seat | Hillsborough 21 | Merrimack 11 |
| Last election | 166 | 234 |
| Seats before | 159 | 231 |
| Seats won | 213 | 187 |
| Seat change | ▲47 | ▼47 |
| Popular vote | 1,319,131 | 1,267,790 |
| Percentage | 50.89% | 48.91% |
- Results: Democratic gain Republican gain Democratic hold Republican hold
Speaker before election
Steve Shurtleff
Democratic
Elected Speaker
Dick Hinch (Note: Hinch died of COVID-19 one week after being elected Speaker. He was succeeded as speaker by Sherman Packard.)
Republican

The 2020 New Hampshire House of Representatives elections took place as part of the biennial United States elections. New Hampshire voters elected all 400 state representatives from 204 districts. State representatives serve two-year terms in the New Hampshire House of Representatives. A primary election on September 8, 2020, determined which candidates appeared on the November 3 general election ballot. All the members elected would serve in the 167th New Hampshire General Court.

Following the 2018 election, Democrats had control of the New Hampshire House of Representatives with 231 seats to Republicans' 159 seats. Following the 2020 election, the Republicans flipped control of the chamber alongside the New Hampshire Senate.

== Results ==
- **Bold** indicates a partisan flip of a seat.
- Italics indicates a change in representative but not party.

| District | | Incumbent | Party | Elected representative | Party |
|---|---|---|---|---|---|
| Belknap | 1 | Harry Viens | Rep | Tom Ploszaj | Rep |
| Belknap | 2 | Harry Bean | Rep | Harry Bean | Rep |
| Belknap | 2 | Glen Aldrich | Rep | Glen Aldrich | Rep |
| Belknap | 2 | Deanna Jurius | Rep | Norm Silber | Rep |
| Belknap | 2 | Jonathan Mackie | Rep | Jonathan Mackie | Rep |
| Belknap | 3 | David Huot | Dem | **Mike Bordes** | **Rep** |
| Belknap | 3 | Peter Spanos | Rep | Gregg Hough | Rep |
| Belknap | 3 | Franklin T. Tilton | Rep | Dawn Johnson | Rep |
| Belknap | 3 | Richard Beaudoin | Rep | Richard Littlefield | Rep |
| Belknap | 4 | Dennis Fields | Rep | Juliet Harvey-Bolia | Rep |
| Belknap | 4 | Timothy Lang Sr. | Rep | Timothy Lang Sr. | Rep |
| Belknap | 5 | George Feeney | Rep | Paul Terry | Rep |
| Belknap | 5 | Peter Varney | Rep | Peter Varney | Rep |
| Belknap | 6 | John Plumer | Rep | Douglas Trottier | Rep |
| Belknap | 6 | Michael Sylvia | Rep | Michael Sylvia | Rep |
| Belknap | 7 | Barbara Comtois | Rep | Barbara Comtois | Rep |
| Belknap | 8 | Raymond Howard | Rep | Raymond Howard | Rep |
| Belknap | 9 | Charlie St. Clair | Dem | **Travis O'Hara** | **Rep** |
| Carroll | 1 | Anita Burroughs | Dem | Anita Burroughs | Dem |
| Carroll | 2 | Thomas Buco | Dem | Thomas Buco | Dem |
| Carroll | 2 | Harrison Kanzler | Dem | **Karen Umberger** | **Rep** |
| Carroll | 2 | Stephen Woodcock | Dem | Stephen Woodcock | Dem |
| Carroll | 3 | Jerry Knirk | Dem | Jerry Knirk | Dem |
| Carroll | 3 | Susan Ticehurst | Dem | **Mark McConkey** | **Rep** |
| Carroll | 4 | Glenn Cordelli | Rep | Glenn Cordelli | Rep |
| Carroll | 4 | Karel Crawford | Rep | Karel Crawford | Rep |
| Carroll | 5 | Lino Avellani | Rep | Lino Avellani | Rep |
| Carroll | 5 | Ed Comeau | Rep | Jonathan Smith | Rep |
| Carroll | 5 | Bill Nelson | Rep | Bill Nelson | Rep |
| Carroll | 6 | Edith DesMarais | Dem | **Brodie Deshaies** | **Rep** |
| Carroll | 6 | John MacDonald | Rep | John MacDonald | Rep |
| Carroll | 7 | Ed Butler | Dem | Chris McAleer | Dem |
| Carroll | 8 | William Marsh | Rep | William Marsh | Rep |
| Cheshire | 1 | Michael Abbott | Dem | Michael Abbott | Dem |
| Cheshire | 1 | Paul Berch | Dem | Paul Berch | Dem |
| Cheshire | 1 | Cathryn Harvey | Dem | Cathryn Harvey | Dem |
| Cheshire | 1 | Lucy Weber | Dem | Lucy Weber | Dem |
| Cheshire | 2 | John Mann | Dem | John Mann | Dem |
| Cheshire | 3 | Dan Eaton | Dem | Dan Eaton | Dem |
| Cheshire | 4 | Vacant (Note: Democrat David Morrill resigned June 1, 2020.) | | Lawrence Welkowitz | Dem |
| Cheshire | 5 | John Bordenet | Dem | John Bordenet | Dem |
| Cheshire | 6 | David Meader | Dem | Dru Fox | Dem |
| Cheshire | 7 | Sparky Von Plinsky | Dem | Sparky Von Plinsky | Dem |
| Cheshire | 8 | Donovan Fenton | Dem | Donovan Fenton | Dem |
| Cheshire | 9 | Richard Ames | Dem | Richard Ames | Dem |
| Cheshire | 9 | Douglas Ley | Dem | Douglas Ley | Dem |
| Cheshire | 10 | Sandy Swinburne | Dem | Lucius Parshall | Dem |
| Cheshire | 11 | John B. Hunt | Rep | John B. Hunt | Rep |
| Cheshire | 11 | John O'Day | Rep | Jim Qualey | Rep |
| Cheshire | 12 | Barry Faulkner | Dem | Barry Faulkner | Dem |
| Cheshire | 12 | Jennie Gomarlo | Dem | Jennie Gomarlo | Dem |
| Cheshire | 13 | Henry Parkhurst | Dem | **Ben Kilanski** | **Rep** |
| Cheshire | 14 | Craig Thompson | Dem | **Matthew Santonastaso** | **Rep** |
| Cheshire | 15 | Bruce Tatro | Dem | **Jennifer Rhodes** | **Rep** |
| Cheshire | 16 | Joe Schapiro | Dem | Joe Schapiro | Dem |
| Cheshire | 16 | William Pearson | Dem | Amanda Toll | Dem |
| Coös | 1 | Jon Fothergill | Rep | Donald Dostie | Rep |
| Coös | 1 | Michael Furbush | Rep | Dennis Thompson | Rep |
| Coös | 2 | Wayne Moynihan | Dem | **Arnold Davis** | **Rep** |
| Coös | 3 | Larry Laflamme | Dem | Larry Laflamme | Dem |
| Coös | 3 | Henry Noel | Dem | Eamon Kelly | Dem |
| Coös | 3 | Yvonne Thomas | Dem | **Robert Theberge** | **Rep** |
| Coös | 4 | Kevin Craig | Rep | Kevin Craig | Rep |
| Coös | 5 | Edith Tucker | Dem | Edith Tucker | Dem |
| Coös | 6 | William Hatch | Dem | William Hatch | Dem |
| Coös | 7 | Troy Merner | Rep | Troy Merner | Rep |
| Grafton | 1 | Erin Hennessey | Rep | Joseph DePalma | Rep |
| Grafton | 1 | Linda Massimilla | Dem | Linda Massimilla | Dem |
| Grafton | 2 | Timothy Egan | Dem | Timothy Egan | Dem |
| Grafton | 3 | Susan Ford | Dem | Dennis Ruprecht | Dem |
| Grafton | 4 | Rick Ladd | Rep | Rick Ladd | Rep |
| Grafton | 5 | Jerry Stringham | Dem | **Bonnie Ham** | **Rep** |
| Grafton | 6 | Kevin Maes | Dem | **Gail Sanborn** | **Rep** |
| Grafton | 7 | Richard Osborne | Dem | **Mark Alliegro** | **Rep** |
| Grafton | 8 | Sallie Fellows | Dem | Sallie Fellows | Dem |
| Grafton | 8 | Suzanne Smith | Dem | Suzanne Smith | Dem |
| Grafton | 8 | Joyce Weston | Dem | Joyce Weston | Dem |
| Grafton | 9 | Ned Gordon | Rep | Ned Gordon | Rep |
| Grafton | 9 | Vacant (Note: Republican Vincent Migliore died May 24, 2020.) | | Lex Berezhny | Rep |
| Grafton | 10 | Roger Dontonville | Dem | Roger Dontonville | Dem |
| Grafton | 11 | Timothy Josephson | Dem | **Beth Folsom** | **Rep** |
| Grafton | 12 | Polly Campion | Dem | Mary Hakken-Phillips | Dem |
| Grafton | 12 | Vacant (Note: Democrat Garrett Muscatel resigned June 9, 2020.) | | James Murphy | Dem |
| Grafton | 12 | Mary Jane Mulligan | Dem | Russell Muirhead | Dem |
| Grafton | 12 | Sharon Nordgren | Dem | Sharon Nordgren | Dem |
| Grafton | 13 | Richard Abel | Dem | Richard Abel | Dem |
| Grafton | 13 | Susan Almy | Dem | Susan Almy | Dem |
| Grafton | 13 | Laurel Stavis | Dem | Laurel Stavis | Dem |
| Grafton | 13 | George Sykes | Dem | George Sykes | Dem |
| Grafton | 14 | Elaine French | Dem | **Matthew Simon** | **Rep** |
| Grafton | 15 | Dennis Ruprecht | Dem | **David Binford** | **Rep** |
| Grafton | 16 | Francesca Diggs | Dem | **Jeffrey Greeson** | **Rep** |
| Grafton | 17 | Joshua Adjutant | Dem | Joshua Adjutant | Dem |
| Hillsborough | 1 | Jim Fedolfi | Rep | Jim Fedolfi | Rep |
| Hillsborough | 1 | Marjorie Porter | Dem | Marjorie Porter | Dem |
| Hillsborough | 2 | Keith Erf | Rep | Keith Erf | Rep |
| Hillsborough | 2 | Gary Hopper | Rep | Gary Hopper | Rep |
| Hillsborough | 2 | J.P. Marzullo | Rep | Leah Cushman | Rep |
| Hillsborough | 3 | Dan Pickering | Dem | Dan Pickering | Dem |
| Hillsborough | 4 | Jennifer Bernet | Dem | **Jim Kofalt** | **Rep** |
| Hillsborough | 4 | Kermit Williams | Dem | **Lisa Post** | **Rep** |
| Hillsborough | 5 | David Woodbury | Dem | **William Foster** | **Rep** |
| Hillsborough | 5 | Donna Mombourquette | Dem | **Gerald Griffin** | **Rep** |
| Hillsborough | 6 | Joe Alexander | Rep | Joe Alexander | Rep |
| Hillsborough | 6 | Barbara Griffin | Rep | Barbara Griffin | Rep |
| Hillsborough | 6 | Michael Gunski | Rep | Michael Gunski | Rep |
| Hillsborough | 6 | Fred Plett | Rep | Fred Plett | Rep |
| Hillsborough | 6 | Cole Riel | Dem | **Claire Rouillard** | **Rep** |
| Hillsborough | 7 | David Danielson | Rep | David Danielson | Rep |
| Hillsborough | 7 | Linda Camarota | Rep | Ted Gorski | Rep |
| Hillsborough | 7 | Linda Gould | Rep | Linda Gould | Rep |
| Hillsborough | 7 | John Graham | Rep | John Graham | Rep |
| Hillsborough | 7 | Sue Mullen | Dem | Sue Mullen | Dem |
| Hillsborough | 7 | Vacant (Note: Republican Michael Trento resigned June 4, 2020.) | | Niki Kelsey | Rep |
| Hillsborough | 8 | Jeff Goley | Dem | Jeff Goley | Dem |
| Hillsborough | 8 | Diane Langley | Dem | Diane Langley | Dem |
| Hillsborough | 9 | Linda DiSilvestro | Dem | Linda DiSilvestro | Dem |
| Hillsborough | 9 | Iz Piedra | Dem | Iz Piedra | Dem |
| Hillsborough | 10 | Jean Jeudy | Dem | Jean Jeudy | Dem |
| Hillsborough | 10 | Pat Long | Dem | Pat Long | Dem |
| Hillsborough | 11 | Donald Bouchard | Dem | Donald Bouchard | Dem |
| Hillsborough | 11 | Nicole Klein-Knight | Dem | Nicole Klein-Knight | Dem |
| Hillsborough | 12 | Amanda Bouldin | Dem | Amanda Bouldin | Dem |
| Hillsborough | 12 | Andrew Bouldin | Dem | Andrew Bouldin | Dem |
| Hillsborough | 13 | Larry Gagne | Rep | Larry Gagne | Rep |
| Hillsborough | 13 | Kathy Desjardin | Dem | **William Infantine** | **Rep** |
| Hillsborough | 14 | Mary Freitas | Dem | Mary Freitas | Dem |
| Hillsborough | 14 | Mary Heath | Dem | Mary Heath | Dem |
| Hillsborough | 15 | Erika Conners | Dem | Erika Conners | Dem |
| Hillsborough | 15 | Mark Warden | Rep | Mark Warden | Rep |
| Hillsborough | 16 | Barbara Shaw | Dem | Barbara Shaw | Dem |
| Hillsborough | 16 | Joshua Query | Dem | Joshua Query | Dem |
| Hillsborough | 17 | Heidi Hamer | Dem | Heidi Hamer | Dem |
| Hillsborough | 17 | Timothy Smith | Dem | Timothy Smith | Dem |
| Hillsborough | 18 | Patricia Cornell | Dem | Patricia Cornell | Dem |
| Hillsborough | 18 | Willis Griffith | Dem | Willis Griffith | Dem |
| Hillsborough | 19 | Bob Backus | Dem | **Dick Marston** | **Rep** |
| Hillsborough | 19 | Kendall Snow | Dem | Kendall Snow | Dem |
| Hillsborough | 20 | Ralph Boehm | Rep | Ralph Boehm | Rep |
| Hillsborough | 20 | Richard Lascelles | Rep | Richard Lascelles | Rep |
| Hillsborough | 21 | Dick Barry | Rep | Melissa Blasek | Rep |
| Hillsborough | 21 | Dick Hinch | Rep | Dick Hinch | Rep |
| Hillsborough | 21 | Bob L'Heureux | Rep | Bob Healey | Rep |
| Hillsborough | 21 | Nancy Murphy | Dem | **Mary Mayville** | **Rep** |
| Hillsborough | 21 | Rosemarie Rung | Dem | Rosemarie Rung | Dem |
| Hillsborough | 21 | Jeanine Notter | Rep | Jeanine Notter | Rep |
| Hillsborough | 21 | Kathryn Stack | Dem | **Maureen Mooney** | **Rep** |
| Hillsborough | 21 | Wendy Thomas | Dem | **Lindsay Tausch** | **Rep** |
| Hillsborough | 22 | Megan Murray | Dem | Megan Murray | Dem |
| Hillsborough | 22 | Julie Radhakrishnan | Dem | Daniel Veilleux | Dem |
| Hillsborough | 22 | Reed Panasiti | Rep | **Tony Labranche** | **Dem** |
| Hillsborough | 23 | Vacant (Note: Republican Charlie Burns resigned May 12, 2020.) | | Bill King | Rep |
| Hillsborough | 23 | Paul Dargie | Dem | **Vanessa Sheehan** | **Rep** |
| Hillsborough | 23 | Joelle Martin | Dem | Maria Perez | Dem |
| Hillsborough | 23 | Peter Petrigno | Dem | Peter Petrigno | Dem |
| Hillsborough | 24 | Peter Leishman | Dem | Peter Leishman | Dem |
| Hillsborough | 24 | Ivy Vann | Dem | Ivy Vann | Dem |
| Hillsborough | 25 | Tim Merlino | Rep | Diane Kelley | Rep |
| Hillsborough | 25 | Paul Somero | Rep | Paul Somero | Rep |
| Hillsborough | 26 | Jack Flanagan | Rep | John Lewicke | Rep |
| Hillsborough | 26 | Brett Hall | Dem | **Diane Pauer** | **Rep** |
| Hillsborough | 27 | Vacant (Note: Republican Jim Belanger resigned September 1, 2019.) | | Susan Homola | Rep |
| Hillsborough | 27 | Michelle St. John | Dem | Kat McGhee | Dem |
| Hillsborough | 28 | Bruce Cohen | Dem | Bruce Cohen | Dem |
| Hillsborough | 28 | William Bordy | Dem | **Tom Lanzara** | **Rep** |
| Hillsborough | 28 | Jan Schmidt | Dem | Jan Schmidt | Dem |
| Hillsborough | 29 | Paul Bergeron | Dem | Paul Bergeron | Dem |
| Hillsborough | 29 | Ray Newman | Dem | Ray Newman | Dem |
| Hillsborough | 29 | Sue Newman | Dem | Sue Newman | Dem |
| Hillsborough | 30 | Patricia Klee | Dem | Patricia Klee | Dem |
| Hillsborough | 30 | Sherry Dutzy | Dem | Sherry Dutzy | Dem |
| Hillsborough | 30 | Suzanne Vail | Dem | Suzanne Vail | Dem |
| Hillsborough | 31 | David Cote | Dem | David Cote | Dem |
| Hillsborough | 31 | Manny Espitia | Dem | Manny Espitia | Dem |
| Hillsborough | 31 | Fred Davis Jr. | Dem | Stacie-Marie Laughton | Dem |
| Hillsborough | 32 | Allison Nutting-Wong | Dem | Allison Nutting-Wong | Dem |
| Hillsborough | 32 | Michael Pedersen | Dem | Michael Pedersen | Dem |
| Hillsborough | 32 | Dan Toomey | Dem | Dan Toomey | Dem |
| Hillsborough | 33 | Ken N. Gidge | Dem | Efstathia Booras | Dem |
| Hillsborough | 33 | Mark King | Dem | Mark King | Dem |
| Hillsborough | 33 | Fran Nutter-Upham | Dem | Fran Nutter-Upham | Dem |
| Hillsborough | 34 | Greg Indruk | Dem | Melbourne Moran | Dem |
| Hillsborough | 34 | Catherine Sofikitis | Dem | Catherine Sofikitis | Dem |
| Hillsborough | 34 | Deb Stevens | Dem | Deb Stevens | Dem |
| Hillsborough | 35 | Skip Cleaver | Dem | Skip Cleaver | Dem |
| Hillsborough | 35 | Latha Mangipudi | Dem | Latha Mangipudi | Dem |
| Hillsborough | 35 | Laura Telerski | Dem | Laura Telerski | Dem |
| Hillsborough | 36 | Linda Harriott-Gathright | Dem | Linda Harriott-Gathright | Dem |
| Hillsborough | 36 | Marty Jack | Dem | Marty Jack | Dem |
| Hillsborough | 36 | Michael O'Brien | Dem | Michael O'Brien | Dem |
| Hillsborough | 37 | Bob Greene | Rep | Bob Greene | Rep |
| Hillsborough | 37 | Alicia Lekas | Rep | Alicia Lekas | Rep |
| Hillsborough | 37 | Tony Lekas | Rep | Tony Lekas | Rep |
| Hillsborough | 37 | Hershel Nunez | Rep | Hershel Nunez | Rep |
| Hillsborough | 37 | Lynne Ober | Rep | Lynne Ober | Rep |
| Hillsborough | 37 | Russell Ober | Rep | Russell Ober | Rep |
| Hillsborough | 37 | Andrew Prout | Rep | Andrew Prout | Rep |
| Hillsborough | 37 | Andrew Renzullo | Rep | Andrew Renzullo | Rep |
| Hillsborough | 37 | Kimberly Rice | Rep | Kimberly Rice | Rep |
| Hillsborough | 37 | Vacant (Note: Republican James Whittemore died March 27, 2020.) | | Denise Smith | Rep |
| Hillsborough | 37 | Jordan Ulery | Rep | Jordan Ulery | Rep |
| Hillsborough | 38 | Chris Balch | Dem | **Jim Creighton** | **Rep** |
| Hillsborough | 38 | John Bosman | Dem | Stephanie Hyland | Dem |
| Hillsborough | 39 | John Burt | Rep | John Burt | Rep |
| Hillsborough | 40 | Kat McGhee | Dem | **Keith Ammon** | **Rep** |
| Hillsborough | 41 | Laurie Sanborn | Rep | Laurie Sanborn | Rep |
| Hillsborough | 42 | Jacqueline Chretien | Dem | Jacqueline Chretien | Dem |
| Hillsborough | 42 | Matthew Wilhelm | Dem | Matthew Wilhelm | Dem |
| Hillsborough | 43 | Benjamin Baroody | Dem | Benjamin Baroody | Dem |
| Hillsborough | 43 | Christopher Herbert | Dem | Christopher Herbert | Dem |
| Hillsborough | 43 | Vacant (Note: Democrat Richard Komi resigned May 2, 2020.) | | Amy Bradley | Dem |
| Hillsborough | 44 | Mark McLean | Rep | Mark McLean | Rep |
| Hillsborough | 44 | Mark Proulx | Rep | Ross Berry | Rep |
| Hillsborough | 45 | Jane Beaulieu | Dem | Jane Beaulieu | Dem |
| Hillsborough | 45 | Connie Van Houten | Dem | Connie Van Houten | Dem |
| Merrimack | 1 | Ken Wells | Dem | **Louise Andrus** | **Rep** |
| Merrimack | 2 | Werner D. Horn | Rep | James Mason | Rep |
| Merrimack | 2 | Dave Testerman | Rep | Dave Testerman | Rep |
| Merrimack | 3 | Greg Hill | Rep | Greg Hill | Rep |
| Merrimack | 3 | Joyce Fulweiler | Dem | **Kenna Cross** | **Rep** |
| Merrimack | 4 | Tom Schamberg | Dem | Tom Schamberg | Dem |
| Merrimack | 5 | Karen Ebel | Dem | Karen Ebel | Dem |
| Merrimack | 5 | Dan Wolf | Rep | Dan Wolf | Rep |
| Merrimack | 6 | Beth Rodd | Dem | Tony Caplan | Dem |
| Merrimack | 6 | Rod Pimentel | Dem | Rod Pimentel | Dem |
| Merrimack | 7 | Clyde Carson | Dem | **Margaret Kennedy** | **Rep** |
| Merrimack | 8 | Robert Forsythe | Rep | **Carolette Alicea** | **Dem** |
| Merrimack | 9 | Howard Moffett | Dem | **Jose Cambrils** | **Rep** |
| Merrimack | 9 | George Saunderson | Dem | **Michael Moffett** | **Rep** |
| Merrimack | 10 | David Luneau | Dem | David Luneau | Dem |
| Merrimack | 10 | Mel Myler | Dem | Mel Myler | Dem |
| Merrimack | 10 | Mary Jane Wallner | Dem | Mary Jane Wallner | Dem |
| Merrimack | 11 | Steve Shurtleff | Dem | Steve Shurtleff | Dem |
| Merrimack | 12 | Connie Lane | Dem | Connie Lane | Dem |
| Merrimack | 13 | Beth Richards | Dem | Beth Richards | Dem |
| Merrimack | 14 | James MacKay | Dem | James MacKay | Dem |
| Merrimack | 15 | Ryan Buchanan | Dem | Eric Gallager | Dem |
| Merrimack | 16 | Timothy Soucy | Dem | Timothy Soucy | Dem |
| Merrimack | 17 | Safiya Wazir | Dem | Safiya Wazir | Dem |
| Merrimack | 18 | Kris Schultz | Dem | Kris Schultz | Dem |
| Merrimack | 19 | Christy Bartlett | Dem | Christy Bartlett | Dem |
| Merrimack | 20 | David Doherty | Dem | **Nick White** | **Rep** |
| Merrimack | 20 | Dianne Schuett | Dem | Dianne Schuett | Dem |
| Merrimack | 20 | Brian Seaworth | Rep | Brian Seaworth | Rep |
| Merrimack | 21 | James Allard | Rep | James Allard | Rep |
| Merrimack | 21 | John Klose | Rep | John Klose | Rep |
| Merrimack | 22 | Alan Turcotte | Dem | **Matthew Pitaro** | **Rep** |
| Merrimack | 23 | Samantha Fox | Dem | Samantha Fox | Dem |
| Merrimack | 23 | Mary Beth Walz | Dem | Mary Beth Walz | Dem |
| Merrimack | 23 | Gary Woods | Dem | Gary Woods | Dem |
| Merrimack | 24 | Frank Kotowski | Rep | Stephen Boyd | Rep |
| Merrimack | 24 | Kathleen Martins | Dem | **John Leavitt** | **Rep** |
| Merrimack | 24 | Thomas Walsh IV | Rep | Thomas Walsh IV | Rep |
| Merrimack | 24 | Michael Yakubovich | Rep | Michael Yakubovich | Rep |
| Merrimack | 25 | David Karrick | Dem | **Natalie Wells** | **Rep** |
| Merrimack | 26 | Howard Pearl | Rep | Howard Pearl | Rep |
| Merrimack | 27 | Art Ellison | Dem | Art Ellison | Dem |
| Merrimack | 27 | Rebecca McWilliams | Dem | Rebecca McWilliams | Dem |
| Merrimack | 28 | Katherine Rogers | Dem | Katherine Rogers | Dem |
| Merrimack | 29 | Carol McGuire | Rep | Carol McGuire | Rep |
| Rockingham | 1 | David Coursin | Dem | **Paul Tudor** | **Rep** |
| Rockingham | 2 | Alan Bershtein | Rep | Alan Bershtein | Rep |
| Rockingham | 2 | James Spillane | Rep | James Spillane | Rep |
| Rockingham | 2 | Kevin Verville | Rep | Kevin Verville | Rep |
| Rockingham | 3 | Michael Costable | Rep | Paul Ayer | Rep |
| Rockingham | 3 | Kathleen Hoelzel | Rep | Dustin Dodge | Rep |
| Rockingham | 3 | Kevin Pratt | Rep | Kevin Pratt | Rep |
| Rockingham | 4 | Jess Edwards | Rep | Jess Edwards | Rep |
| Rockingham | 4 | Becky Owens | Rep | Oliver Ford | Rep |
| Rockingham | 4 | Jason Osborne | Rep | Jason Osborne | Rep |
| Rockingham | 4 | Chris True | Rep | Chris True | Rep |
| Rockingham | 4 | Tony Piemonte | Rep | Tony Piemonte | Rep |
| Rockingham | 5 | Al Baldasaro | Rep | Al Baldasaro | Rep |
| Rockingham | 5 | Tom Dolan | Rep | Tom Dolan | Rep |
| Rockingham | 5 | David Lundgren | Rep | David Lundgren | Rep |
| Rockingham | 5 | Betsy McKinney | Rep | Betsy McKinney | Rep |
| Rockingham | 5 | Sherman Packard | Rep | Sherman Packard | Rep |
| Rockingham | 5 | Anne Warner | Dem | **Wayne MacDonald** | **Rep** |
| Rockingham | 5 | Douglas Thomas | Rep | Douglas Thomas | Rep |
| Rockingham | 6 | Brian Chirichiello | Rep | Anne Copp | Rep |
| Rockingham | 6 | Mary Eisner | Dem | **Erica Layon** | **Rep** |
| Rockingham | 6 | David Love | Rep | David Love | Rep |
| Rockingham | 6 | Phyllis Katsakiores | Rep | Phyllis Katsakiores | Rep |
| Rockingham | 6 | David Milz | Rep | David Milz | Rep |
| Rockingham | 6 | John O'Connor | Rep | Mary Ann Kimball | Rep |
| Rockingham | 6 | Katherine O'Brien | Rep | Katherine O'Brien | Rep |
| Rockingham | 6 | Stephen Pearson | Rep | Stephen Pearson | Rep |
| Rockingham | 6 | John Potucek | Rep | John Potucek | Rep |
| Rockingham | 6 | James C. Webb | Rep | Richard Tripp | Rep |
| Rockingham | 7 | Joel Desilets | Rep | Bob Lynn | Rep |
| Rockingham | 7 | Mary Griffin | Rep | Mary Griffin | Rep |
| Rockingham | 7 | Walter Kolodziej | Rep | Julius Soti | Rep |
| Rockingham | 7 | Charles McMahon | Rep | Charles McMahon | Rep |
| Rockingham | 8 | Daryl Abbas | Rep | Daryl Abbas | Rep |
| Rockingham | 8 | Arthur Barnes III | Rep | Joseph Sweeney | Rep |
| Rockingham | 8 | Ed DeClercq | Rep | Susan Vandecasteele | Rep |
| Rockingham | 8 | Fred Doucette | Rep | Fred Doucette | Rep |
| Rockingham | 8 | Robert Elliott | Rep | Robert Elliott | Rep |
| Rockingham | 8 | Betty Gay | Rep | Betty Gay | Rep |
| Rockingham | 8 | John Janigian | Rep | John Janigian | Rep |
| Rockingham | 8 | Everett McBride | Rep | Everett McBride | Rep |
| Rockingham | 8 | John Sytek | Rep | John Sytek | Rep |
| Rockingham | 9 | Sean Morrison | Rep | Sean Morrison | Rep |
| Rockingham | 9 | Mark Vallone | Dem | **Cody Belanger** | **Rep** |
| Rockingham | 10 | Dennis Acton | Rep | Dennis Acton | Rep |
| Rockingham | 11 | Liz McConnell | Dem | **Melissa Litchfield** | **Rep** |
| Rockingham | 12 | Scott Wallace | Rep | Scott Wallace | Rep |
| Rockingham | 13 | Dennis Green | Rep | Dennis Green | Rep |
| Rockingham | 13 | Joseph Guthrie | Rep | Joseph Guthrie | Rep |
| Rockingham | 13 | David Welch | Rep | David Welch | Rep |
| Rockingham | 13 | Kenneth Weyler | Rep | Kenneth Weyler | Rep |
| Rockingham | 14 | Debra DeSimone | Rep | Debra DeSimone | Rep |
| Rockingham | 14 | Robert Harb | Rep | Robert Harb | Rep |
| Rockingham | 14 | Norman Major | Rep | Norman Major | Rep |
| Rockingham | 14 | Peter Torosian | Rep | Peter Torosian | Rep |
| Rockingham | 15 | Charles Melvin | Rep | Charles Melvin | Rep |
| Rockingham | 16 | Dan Davis | Rep | JD Bernardy | Rep |
| Rockingham | 17 | Michael Cahill | Dem | Michael Cahill | Dem |
| Rockingham | 17 | Charlotte DiLorenzo | Dem | Charlotte DiLorenzo | Dem |
| Rockingham | 17 | Ellen Read | Dem | Ellen Read | Dem |
| Rockingham | 18 | Skip Berrien | Dem | Mark Paige | Dem |
| Rockingham | 18 | Lisa Bunker | Dem | Lisa Bunker | Dem |
| Rockingham | 18 | Gaby Grossman | Dem | Gaby Grossman | Dem |
| Rockingham | 18 | Julie Gilman | Dem | Julie Gilman | Dem |
| Rockingham | 19 | Patrick Abrami | Rep | Patrick Abrami | Rep |
| Rockingham | 19 | Debra Altschiller | Dem | Debra Altschiller | Dem |
| Rockingham | 20 | Max Abramson | Rep | Tim Baxter | Rep |
| Rockingham | 20 | William Fowler | Rep | Tina Harley | Rep |
| Rockingham | 20 | Aboul Khan | Rep | Aboul Khan | Rep |
| Rockingham | 21 | Patricia Bushway | Dem | **Tracy Emerick** | **Rep** |
| Rockingham | 21 | Renny Cushing | Dem | Renny Cushing | Dem |
| Rockingham | 21 | Mike Edgar | Dem | Mike Edgar | Dem |
| Rockingham | 21 | Tom Loughman | Dem | Tom Loughman | Dem |
| Rockingham | 22 | Jim Maggiore | Dem | Jim Maggiore | Dem |
| Rockingham | 23 | Dennis Malloy | Dem | Dennis Malloy | Dem |
| Rockingham | 24 | Jaci Grote | Dem | Jaci Grote | Dem |
| Rockingham | 24 | Kate Murray | Dem | Kate Murray | Dem |
| Rockingham | 25 | Laura Pantelakos | Dem | Laura Pantelakos | Dem |
| Rockingham | 26 | Rebecca McBeath | Dem | Rebecca McBeath | Dem |
| Rockingham | 27 | Peter Somssich | Dem | Peter Somssich | Dem |
| Rockingham | 28 | Gerry Ward | Dem | Gerry Ward | Dem |
| Rockingham | 29 | David Meuse | Dem | David Meuse | Dem |
| Rockingham | 30 | Jacqueline Cali-Pitts | Dem | Jacqueline Cali-Pitts | Dem |
| Rockingham | 31 | Tamara Le | Dem | Joan Hamblet | Dem |
| Rockingham | 32 | Terry Roy | Rep | Terry Roy | Rep |
| Rockingham | 33 | Josh Yokela | Rep | Josh Yokela | Rep |
| Rockingham | 34 | Mark Pearson | Rep | Mark Pearson | Rep |
| Rockingham | 35 | Deborah Hobson | Rep | Deborah Hobson | Rep |
| Rockingham | 36 | Patricia Lovejoy | Dem | Alexis Simpson | Dem |
| Rockingham | 37 | Jason Janvrin | Rep | Max Abramson | Rep |
| Strafford | 1 | Peter Hayward | Rep | Peter Hayward | Rep |
| Strafford | 1 | Abigail Rooney | Rep | Glenn Bailey | Rep |
| Strafford | 2 | James Horgan | Rep | James Horgan | Rep |
| Strafford | 2 | Joseph Pitre | Rep | Joseph Pitre | Rep |
| Strafford | 3 | Michael Harrington | Rep | Michael Harrington | Rep |
| Strafford | 3 | Kurt Wuelper | Rep | Kurt Wuelper | Rep |
| Strafford | 4 | Cassandra Levesque | Dem | Cassandra Levesque | Dem |
| Strafford | 4 | Matthew Towne | Dem | **Len Turcotte** | **Rep** |
| Strafford | 5 | Jeffrey Salloway | Dem | Jeffrey Salloway | Dem |
| Strafford | 6 | Timothy Horrigan | Dem | Timothy Horrigan | Dem |
| Strafford | 6 | Cam Kenney | Dem | Cam Kenney | Dem |
| Strafford | 6 | Marjorie Smith | Dem | Marjorie Smith | Dem |
| Strafford | 6 | Judith Spang | Dem | Judith Spang | Dem |
| Strafford | 6 | Janet Wall | Dem | Janet Wall | Dem |
| Strafford | 7 | Timothy Fontneau | Dem | Timothy Fontneau | Dem |
| Strafford | 8 | Donna Ellis | Dem | Donna Ellis | Dem |
| Strafford | 9 | Steven Beaudoin | Rep | Clifford Newton | Rep |
| Strafford | 10 | Vacant (Note: Republican Jody McNally resigned January 1, 2020.) | | Aidan Ankarberg | Rep |
| Strafford | 11 | Chuck Grassie | Dem | Chuck Grassie | Dem |
| Strafford | 12 | Mac Kittredge | Rep | Mac Kittredge | Rep |
| Strafford | 13 | Casey Conley | Dem | Casey Conley | Dem |
| Strafford | 14 | Kristina Fargo | Dem | Kristina Fargo | Dem |
| Strafford | 15 | Linn Opderbecke | Dem | Ariel Oxaal | Dem |
| Strafford | 16 | Sherry Frost | Dem | Sherry Frost | Dem |
| Strafford | 17 | Peter Bixby | Dem | Peter Bixby | Dem |
| Strafford | 17 | Susan Treleaven | Dem | Susan Treleaven | Dem |
| Strafford | 17 | Kenneth Vincent | Dem | Kenneth Vincent | Dem |
| Strafford | 18 | Gerri Cannon | Dem | Gerri Cannon | Dem |
| Strafford | 18 | Wendy Chase | Dem | Wendy Chase | Dem |
| Strafford | 18 | Cecilia Rich | Dem | Cecilia Rich | Dem |
| Strafford | 19 | Peter B. Schmidt | Dem | Peter B. Schmidt | Dem |
| Strafford | 20 | Thomas Southworth | Dem | Thomas Southworth | Dem |
| Strafford | 21 | Catt Sandler | Dem | Catt Sandler | Dem |
| Strafford | 22 | Peg Higgins | Dem | **Thomas Kaczynski** | **Rep** |
| Strafford | 23 | Sandra Keans | Dem | **Fenton Groen** | **Rep** |
| Strafford | 24 | Mona Perreault | Rep | Susan DeLemus | Rep |
| Strafford | 25 | Amanda Gourgue | Dem | Amanda Gourgue | Dem |
| Sullivan | 1 | Lee Oxenham | Dem | Lee Oxenham | Dem |
| Sullivan | 1 | Brian Sullivan | Dem | Brian Sullivan | Dem |
| Sullivan | 2 | Vacant (Note: Republican Gates Lucas resigned July 14, 2019.) | | **Sue Gottling** | **Dem** |
| Sullivan | 3 | Andrew O'Hearne | Dem | Andrew O'Hearne | Dem |
| Sullivan | 4 | Gary Merchant | Dem | Gary Merchant | Dem |
| Sullivan | 5 | Walter Stapleton | Rep | Walter Stapleton | Rep |
| Sullivan | 6 | John Callum | Rep | John Callum | Rep |
| Sullivan | 6 | Skip Rollins | Rep | Skip Rollins | Rep |
| Sullivan | 7 | Judy Aron | Rep | Judy Aron | Rep |
| Sullivan | 8 | Tom Laware | Rep | Walter Spilsbury | Rep |
| Sullivan | 9 | Linda Tanner | Dem | Linda Tanner | Dem |
| Sullivan | 10 | John Cloutier | Dem | John Cloutier | Dem |
| Sullivan | 11 | Steven D. Smith | Rep | Steven D. Smith | Rep |

== Retiring incumbents ==
71 incumbent Representatives (35 Democrats and 36 Republicans) did not seek re-election in 2020:

1. Belknap 1: Harry Viens (R)
2. Belknap 3: Richard Beaudoin (R)
3. Belknap 3: Peter Spanos (R)
4. Belknap 3: Frank Tilton (R)
5. Belknap 4: Dennis Fields (R)
6. Belknap 5: George Feeney (R)
7. Carroll 2: Harrison Kanzler (D)
8. Carroll 5: Ed Comeau (R)
9. Carroll 6: Edith DesMarais (D)
10. Carroll 7: Ed Butler (D)
11. Cheshire 6: David Meader (D)
12. Cheshire 10: Sandy Swinburne (D)
13. Cheshire 11: John O'Day (R)
14. Cheshire 14: Craig Thompson (D) (ran for Executive Council [lost primary])
15. Coös 1: Jon Fothergill (R)
16. Coös 1: Michael Furbush (R)
17. Coös 2: Wayne Moynihan (D)
18. Coös 3: Yvonne Thomas (D)
19. Grafton 1: Erin Hennessey (R) (ran for State Senate [won])
20. Grafton 3: Susan Ford (D) (ran for State Senate [lost])
21. Grafton 12: Polly Campion (D)
22. Grafton 12: Mary Jane Mulligan (D)
23. Hillsborough 2: J.P. Marzullo (R)
24. Hillsborough 6: Cole Riel (D)
25. Hillsborough 7: Linda Camarota (R)
26. Hillsborough 13: Kathy Desjardin (D)
27. Hillsborough 19: Bob Backus (D)
28. Hillsborough 21: Dick Barry (D)
29. Hillsborough 21: Bob L'Heureux (R)
30. Hillsborough 22: Reed Panasiti (R)
31. Hillsborough 22: Julie Radhakrishnan (D)
32. Hillsborough 23: Paul Dargie (D)
33. Hillsborough 23: Charlie Burns (R)
34. Hillsborough 23: Joelle Martin (D)
35. Hillsborough 25: Tim Merlino (R)
36. Hillsborough 26: Jack Flanagan (R)
37. Hillsborough 26: Brett Hall (R)
38. Hillsborough 27: Michelle St. John (D)
39. Hillsborough 34: Greg Indruk (D)
40. Hillsborough 37: James Whittemore (R)
41. Hillsborough 38: Chris Balch (D)
42. Hillsborough 44: Mark Proulx (R)
43. Merrimack 2: Werner D. Horn (R)
44. Merrimack 6: Beth Rodd (D)
45. Merrimack 8: Robert Forsythe (R)
46. Merrimack 9: Howard Moffett (D)
47. Merrimack 9: George Saunderson (D)
48. Merrimack 15: Ryan Buchanan (D)
49. Merrimack 22: Alan Turcotte (D)
50. Merrimack 24: Frank Kotowski (R)
51. Merrimack 25: David Karrick (D)
52. Rockingham 1: David Coursin (D)
53. Rockingham 3: Michael Costable (R)
54. Rockingham 3: Kathleen Hoelzel (R)
55. Rockingham 4: Becky Owens (R)
56. Rockingham 6: Brian Chirichiello (R)
57. Rockingham 6: John O'Connor (R)
58. Rockingham 6: James C. Webb (R)
59. Rockingham 7: Joel Desilets (R)
60. Rockingham 8: Arthur Barnes (R)
61. Rockingham 8: Ed DeClercq (R)
62. Rockingham 16: Dan Davis (R)
63. Rockingham 18: Skip Berrien (D)
64. Rockingham 21: Patricia Bushway (D)
65. Rockingham 31: Tamara Le (D)
66. Rockingham 36: Patricia Lovejoy (D) (ran for Executive Council [lost primary])
67. Sullivan 2: Gates Lucas (R)
68. Strafford 9: Steven Beaudoin (R)
69. Strafford 15: Linn Opderbecke (D)
70. Strafford 24: Mona Perreault (R)
71. Sullivan 8: Tom Laware (R)

== Defeated incumbents ==
=== In the primary ===
10 incumbent representatives (6 Republicans and 4 Democrats) sought reelection but were defeated in the September 8 primary.

1. Belknap 2: Deanna Jurius (R)
2. Belknap 6: John Plumer (R)
3. Cheshire 13: Henry Parkhurst (D)
4. Cheshire 16: William Pearson (D)
5. Hillsborough 31: Fred Davis Jr. (D)
6. Hillsborough 33: Ken N. Gidge (D)
7. Rockingham 7: Walter Kolodziej (R)
8. Rockingham 20: William Fowler (R)
9. Rockingham 37: Jason Janvrin (R)
10. Strafford 1: Abigail Rooney (R)

=== In the general election ===
33 incumbent representatives (32 Democrats and one Republican) sought reelection but were defeated in the November 3 general election.

1. Belknap 3: David Huot (D)
2. Belknap 9: Charlie St. Clair (D)
3. Carroll 3: Susan Ticehurst (D)
4. Cheshire 13: Bruce Tatro (D)
5. Coös 3: Henry Noel (D)
6. Grafton 5: Jerry Stringham (D)
7. Grafton 6: Kevin Maes (D)
8. Grafton 7: Richard Osborne (D)
9. Grafton 11: Timothy Josephson (D)
10. Grafton 14: Elaine French (D)
11. Hillsborough 4: Jennifer Bernet (D)
12. Hillsborough 4: Kermit Williams (D)
13. Hillsborough 5: David Woodbury (D)
14. Hillsborough 5: Donna Mombourquette (D)
15. Hillsborough 21: Wendy Thomas (D)
16. Hillsborough 21: Nancy Murphy (D)
17. Hillsborough 21: Kathryn Stack (D)
18. Hillsborough 28: William Bordy (D)
19. Hillsborough 38: James Bosman (D)
20. Merrimack 1: Ken Wells (D)
21. Merrimack 3: Joyce Fulweiler (D)
22. Merrimack 7: Clyde Carson (D)
23. Merrimack 8: Robert Forsythe (R)
24. Merrimack 20: David Doherty (D)
25. Merrimack 24: Kathleen Martins (D)
26. Rockingham 5: Anne Warner (D)
27. Rockingham 6: Mary Eisner (D)
28. Rockingham 9: Mark Vallone (D)
29. Rockingham 11: Liz McConnell (D)
30. Strafford 4: Matthew Towne (D)
31. Strafford 22: Peg Higgins (D)
32. Strafford 23: Sandra Keans (D)

== Predictions ==
| Source | Ranking | As of |
|---|---|---|
| The Cook Political Report | Lean D | October 21, 2020 |

== See also ==
- 2020 New Hampshire elections
- 2020 United States elections
- 2020 United States Senate election in New Hampshire
- 2020 United States House of Representatives elections in New Hampshire
- New Hampshire gubernatorial election, 2020
- List of New Hampshire General Courts
