= Michael Cahill =

Michael Cahill may refer to:

- Michael P. Cahill (born 1961), American politician in Massachusetts
- Michael Cahill (Irish politician)
- Michael Cahill (New Hampshire politician)
- Michael T. Cahill, American law professor
- Mike Cahill (filmmaker) (born 1979), American filmmaker
- Mike Cahill (golfer), (born 1951), Australian golfer
- Michael Cahill (hurler) (born 1989), Irish hurler
- Mike Cahill (tennis) (born 1952), American tennis player
