= John O'Day (New Hampshire politician) =

American politician from New Hampshire

Member of the New Hampshire House of Representatives from the Cheshire 11th district
- In office December 7, 2016 – December 2, 2020 Serving with John B. Hunt
- Preceded by: Susan Emerson
- Succeeded by: Jim Qualey

Personal details
- Party: Republican

John E. O'Day is an American Republican politician. He served in the New Hampshire House of Representatives from 2016 to 2020.
