= Caroletta Alicea =

American politician

Member of New Hampshire House of Representatives for Merrimack 8
- In office December 2, 2020 – December 7, 2022
- Preceded by: Robert Forsythe
- Succeeded by: Tony Caplan

Personal details
- Party: Democratic

Caroletta C. Alicea is an American politician. She was elected a member of the New Hampshire House of Representatives in the 2020 election.

She served as a trustee of the Capital City Public Charter School.
