= Santonastaso =

Santonastaso is a surname. Notable people with the surname include:

- Matthew Santonastaso, American politician
- Pippo Santonastaso (born 1936), Italian actor
