= Henry Parkhurst =

American politician

Member of the New Hampshire House of Representatives from the Cheshire 13 district
- In office 2002–2020
- Succeeded by: Ben Kilanski

Personal details
- Born: January 1937 (age 89) Keene, New Hampshire, U.S.
- Party: Democratic

Military service
- Branch/service: United States Coast Guard

Henry A. L. Parkhurst (born January 1937) is a New Hampshire politician.

== Early life ==
Parkhurst was born in January 1937 in Keene, New Hampshire.

== Military career ==
Parkhurst served in the United States Coast Guard.

== Political career ==
In 2002, Parkhurst was elected to the New Hampshire House of Representatives where he represents the Cheshire 13 district. Parkhurst assumed office in 2002. Parkhurst is a Democrat.

== Personal life ==
Parkhurst resides in Winchester, New Hampshire.
