= William Bordy =

American politician

Member of New Hampshire House of Representatives for Hillsborough 28
- In office December 5, 2018 – December 2, 2020
- Succeeded by: Tom Lanzara

Personal details
- Party: Democratic

William Bordy is an American politician. He was a member of the New Hampshire House of Representatives and represented Hillsborough 28th district.
