= Jim Maggiore =

American politician

Member of the New Hampshire House of Representatives from the Rockingham 23rd district
- Incumbent
- Assumed office December 7, 2022
- Preceded by: Dennis Malloy

Member of the New Hampshire House of Representatives from the Rockingham 22nd district
- In office December 5, 2018 – December 7, 2022
- Preceded by: Henry Marsh
- Succeeded by: Kate Murray

Personal details
- Born: 1967 or 1968 (age 58–59) Long Island, New York, U.S.
- Party: Democratic
- Education: Stonehill College (BA)

James V. "Jim" Maggiore (born 1967/1968) is an American politician. He serves as a Democratic member for the Rockingham 23rd district of the New Hampshire House of Representatives.
