= Lindsay Tausch =

American politician

Member of New Hampshire House of Representatives for Hillsborough 21
- In office December 2, 2020 – December 7, 2022
- Preceded by: Wendy Thomas
- Succeeded by: Wendy Thomas

Personal details
- Party: Republican

Lindsay Tausch is an American politician. She was elected a member of the New Hampshire House of Representatives in the 2020 election.

She is a member of Generation Z.
