= Werner D. Horn =

American politician

Werner D. Horn is an American politician born in Germany to Werner and Marilee Horn. He served 3 terms as a Republican member of the New Hampshire House of Representatives, representing Merrimack County District 2, the town of Hill and wards 1 and 2 of the city of Franklin. He was first elected in 2014 and served on the House Transportation Committee. Horn was re-elected in 2016 and continued to serve on House Transportation. With his second re-election in 2018, Rep Werner Horn serves on House Finance in Division II, responsible for the budgets of the New Hampshire Departments of Education, Fish and Game, Safety, and Transportation, the University System of New Hampshire, the Community College System of New Hampshire, and the Lottery Commission.

On July 19, 2019, Horn made national news with a comment on Dan Hynes' controversial post on Facebook saying that, “Owning slaves does not make you a racist.” Dan Hynes later told the HuffPost that his comment was intended to be sarcastic, Horn said that "to label the institution [of slavery] as racist is a false narrative".

In April 2020, Werner made the decision not to run for a fourth term.

New Hampshire House of Representatives
Preceded by Dennis Reed; Scott A. Burns	Member of the New Hampshire House of Representatives from the Merrimack 2nd district 2014–2020; Served alongside: Harold F. French, Dave Testerman	Succeeded by James Mason
