= Michelle St. John (politician) =

American politician

Member of New Hampshire House of Representatives for Hillsborough 27
- In office December 5, 2018 – December 1, 2020
- Succeeded by: Kat McGhee

Personal details
- Party: Democratic

Michelle St. John is an American politician. She was a member of the New Hampshire House of Representatives and represented Hillsborough's 27th district.
