= John Plumer =

American politician

Member of the New Hampshire House of Representatives from the Belknap 6th district
- In office December 2016 – December 1, 2020
- Preceded by: Shari Lebreche
- Succeeded by: Douglas Trottier

Personal details
- Party: Republican

John R. Plumer is a New Hampshire politician, and currently serves in the New Hampshire House of Representatives.
