= Craig Thompson (politician) =

American politician

Member of the New Hampshire House of Representatives
- In office December 5, 2018 – December 2, 2020
- Succeeded by: Matthew Santonastaso
- Constituency: Cheshire 14

Personal details
- Party: Democratic

Craig R. Thompson is an American politician from New Hampshire. He served in the New Hampshire House of Representatives.
