= Shari Lebreche =

American politician

Member of New Hampshire House of Representatives for Belknap 6
- In office 2014–2016

Personal details
- Party: Republican

Shari Lebreche is an American politician. She was a member of the New Hampshire House of Representatives and represented Belknap 6th district from 2014 to 2016. She was a candidate for the same district in 2020. Lebreche is the owner of Tilton's Haircuts for Men in Belmont, New Hampshire.
