= Tim Merlino =

American politician

Member of New Hampshire House of Representatives for Hillsborough 25
- In office December 5, 2018 – December 2, 2020
- Succeeded by: Diane Kelley

Personal details
- Party: Republican

Timothy "Tim" Merlino is an American politician. He was a member of the New Hampshire House of Representatives and represented Hillsborough's 25th district.
