= Clyde Carson (politician) =

American politician

Member of New Hampshire House of Representatives for Merrimack 7
- In office December 5, 2012 – December 2, 2020
- Succeeded by: Margaret Kennedy

Personal details
- Party: Democratic

Clyde Carson is an American politician. He was a member of the New Hampshire House of Representatives and represented Merrimack's 7th district.
