= Dan Davis (New Hampshire politician) =

American politician

Member of the New Hampshire House of Representatives
- In office December 5, 2018 – December 1, 2020
- Preceded by: Bob Nigrello
- Succeeded by: JD Bernardy
- Constituency: Rockingham 16

Personal details
- Party: Republican

Dan Davis is an American politician from New Hampshire. He served in the New Hampshire House of Representatives.
