= Tom Laware =

American politician

Member of the New Hampshire House of Representatives from the Sullivan 8 district
- In office December 3, 2014 – December 2, 2020
- Succeeded by: Walter “Terry” Spilsbury

Member of the New Hampshire House of Representatives from the Sullivan 5 district
- In office 2010–2012

Personal details
- Party: Republican
- Children: 1
- Education: Keene State College

Military service
- Allegiance: United States Air Force
- Years of service: 1971-1975
- Battles/wars: Vietnam War

Thomas Laware is a former New Hampshire politician.

== Education ==
Laware earned a B.A. from Keene State College.

== Military career ==
Laware served in the United States Air Force in 1971 to 1975 in the Vietnam War.

== Political career ==
Laware served in the New Hampshire House of Representatives where he represented Sullivan 5 district from 2010 to 2012. On November 4, 2014, Laware was elected to the New Hampshire House of Representatives where he represents the Sullivan 8 district. Laware assumed office on December 3, 2014. Laware is a Republican.

== Personal life ==
Laware resides in Charlestown, New Hampshire. Laware is married and has one child. Laware is a member of the National Rifle Association of America, the American Legion, and the Veterans of Foreign Wars.
