= Peter Somssich =

American politician

Member of the New Hampshire House of Representatives
- In office 2016 – December 7, 2022
- Succeeded by: Gerry Ward
- Constituency: Rockingham 27

Personal details
- Party: Democratic

Peter F. Somssich is an American politician from New Hampshire. He served in the New Hampshire House of Representatives.
