= Donna Mombourquette =

American politician

Member of New Hampshire House of Representatives for Hillsborough 5
- In office December 5, 2018 – December 1, 2020
- Succeeded by: Gerald Griffin

Personal details
- Party: Democratic

Donna Mombourquette is an American politician. She was a member of the New Hampshire House of Representatives and represented Hillsborough's 5th district.
