= Cameron Thompson (American politician) =

American politician

Member-elect of the New Hampshire House of Representatives from the Belknap 8th district
- Assuming office December 2026
- Succeeding: Douglas Trottier

Personal details
- Party: Republican

Cameron Thompson is an American politician. A member of the Republican Party, he is the member-elect for the Belknap 8th district of the New Hampshire House of Representatives.
