= David Coursin =

American politician

Member of New Hampshire House of Representatives for Rockingham 1
- In office December 5, 2018 – December 1, 2020
- Succeeded by: Paul Tudor

Personal details
- Party: Democratic

David Coursin is an American politician. He was a member of the New Hampshire House of Representatives and represented Rockingham 1st district.
