= Jon Fothergill =

American politician

Member of New Hampshire House of Representatives for Coos 1
- In office December 3, 2014 – December 1, 2020
- Succeeded by: Donald Dostie

Personal details
- Party: Republican

Jon Fothergill is an American politician. He was a member of the New Hampshire House of Representatives and represented Coos 1st district.
