= Michael Furbush =

American politician

Member of New Hampshire House of Representatives for Coos 1
- In office December 5, 2018 – December 2, 2020
- Succeeded by: Dennis Thompson

Personal details
- Party: Republican

Michael E. Furbush is an American politician. He was a member of the New Hampshire House of Representatives and represented Coos 1st district.
