= Tamara Le =

American politician

Member of New Hampshire House of Representatives for Rockingham 31
- In office 2016 – December 1, 2020
- Succeeded by: Joan Hamblet

Personal details
- Party: Democratic

Tamara Meyer Le is an American politician. She was a member of the New Hampshire House of Representatives.

In 2020, she endorsed the Elizabeth Warren 2020 presidential campaign.
