= Dennis Fields =

American politician

Member of the New Hampshire House of Representatives from the Belknap 4 district
- In office 2008–2020
- Succeeded by: Juliet Harvey-Bolia

Personal details
- Born: May 2, 1945 (age 81) North Troy, Vermont, U.S.
- Party: Republican

Dennis Fields (born May 2, 1945) is an American politician in the state of New Hampshire. He is a member of the New Hampshire House of Representatives, sitting as a Republican from the Belknap 4 district, having been first elected in 2008. He previously served from 1982 to 2004.

New Hampshire House of Representatives
Preceded by Multi-member district	Member of the New Hampshire House of Representatives from the Hillsborough 13th district 1982–1992	Succeeded by Multi-member district
Preceded by George W. Wright; Susan B. Durham	Member of the New Hampshire House of Representatives from the Hillsborough 18th district 1992–2002	Succeeded by District abolished
Preceded by District created	Member of the New Hampshire House of Representatives from the Hillsborough 58th district 2002–2004	Succeeded by District abolished
Preceded by Gail Morrison; Bill Tobin	Member of the New Hampshire House of Representatives from the Belknap 2nd district 2008–2012	Succeeded by Multi-member district
Preceded by Multi-member district	Member of the New Hampshire House of Representatives from the Belknap 4th district 2012–2020	Succeeded by Juliet Harvey-Bolia
