= Sean Morrison (New Hampshire politician) =

American politician

Member of New Hampshire House of Representatives for Rockingham 9th
- In office 2016–2019

Personal details
- Party: Republican

Sean D. Morrison is an American politician. He was a member of the New Hampshire House of Representatives from 2016 to 2019.

Morrison endorsed the Donald Trump 2024 presidential campaign in the 2024 United States presidential election.
