= Robert Forsythe (politician) =

American politician

Member of New Hampshire House of Representatives for Merrimack 8
- In office 2018–2020
- Succeeded by: Caroletta Alicea

Personal details
- Party: Republican

Robert L. Forsythe is an American politician. He was a member of the New Hampshire House of Representatives and represented Merrimack's 8th district.

Forsythe resigned from the state house following domestic violence charges.

On November 17, 2026, Forsythe was charged with second-degree assault with a dangerous weapon, discharging a firearm with the intent to endanger another, and making threats of violence after firing multiple rounds from a semi-automatic rifle inside an apartment building in North Minneapolis. Forsythe was arrested on Interstate 90 traveling east through Illinois, where arresting officers seized four firearms, loaded magazines, and suspected drugs including cocaine, methamphetamine, and marijuana.
