= Lino Avellani =

American politician

Member of the New Hampshire House of Representatives from the Carroll 5th district
- In office December 3, 2014 – December 7, 2022

Member of the New Hampshire House of Representatives from the Carroll 4th district
- Incumbent
- Assumed office December 7, 2022

Personal details
- Party: Republican

Lino Avellani is an American politician. He serves as a Republican member for the Carroll 4th district of the New Hampshire House of Representatives.
