= Nicole Klein-Knight =

American Democratic Party politician from New Hampshire

Nicole-Klein Knight

Member of the New Hampshire House of Representatives from the Hillsborough 11th district
- In office 2018 – December 7, 2022

Personal details
- Party: Democratic

Nicole Klein-Knight is an American politician and a former member of the New Hampshire House of Representatives. She also worked as communications and marketing coordinator for Jews for a Secular Democracy.
