= John Callum =

American politician

Member of the New Hampshire House of Representatives from the Sullivan 6th district
- Incumbent
- Assumed office December 4, 2018
- Preceded by: Virginia Irwin

Personal details
- Party: Republican

Military service
- Allegiance: United States Navy
- Years of service: 1962-1966

John Callum is a New Hampshire politician.

== Early life ==
Callum graduated from Stevens High School. He served in the United States Navy from 1962 to 1966.

== Political career ==
On November 6, 2018, Callum was elected to the New Hampshire House of Representatives where he represents the Sullivan 6 district. Callum assumed office on December 4, 2018. Callum is a Republican.

== Personal life ==
Callum resides in Unity, New Hampshire. Callum has three children and four grandchildren.
