= John T. O'Connor =

American politician from New Hampshire

John O'Connor

Member of the New Hampshire House of Representatives from the Rockingham 6th district
- In office 2010 – December 1, 2020

Personal details
- Party: Republican

John T. O'Connor is an American politician. A Republican from Derry, New Hampshire, he was a member of the New Hampshire House of Representatives, representing the Rockingham 6th district from 2010 to 2020. He did not file for re-election in 2020.

Before his legislative service, O'Connor worked as a director of operations in the food industry.
