= John MacDonald (New Hampshire politician) =

American politician

Member of the New Hampshire House of Representatives from the Carroll 6th district
- Incumbent
- Assumed office December 5, 2018

Personal details
- Party: Republican

John MacDonald is an American politician. He serves as a Republican member for the Carroll 6th district of the New Hampshire House of Representatives.
