= Paul Somero =

American politician

Member of New Hampshire House of Representatives for Hillsborough 25
- In office 2016 – December 7, 2022

Personal details
- Party: Republican

Paul Somero is an American politician. He was a member of the New Hampshire House of Representatives and represented Hillsborough's 25th district.
