= Sherry Frost =

American politician

Member of the New Hampshire House of Representatives from the Strafford 16th district
- In office December 2016 – December 2022
- Preceded by: Len DiSesa

Personal details
- Party: Democratic

Sherry Frost was a New Hampshire politician.

== Career ==
On November 8, 2016, Frost was elected to the New Hampshire House of Representatives where she represented the Strafford 16 district. Frost assumed office in 2016. Frost is a Democrat. Frost endorsed Bernie Sanders in the 2020 Democratic Party presidential primaries.

== Personal life ==
Frost resides in Dover, New Hampshire.
