= Catt Sandler =

American politician

Member of the New Hampshire House of Representatives
- In office 2016 – December 7, 2022
- Succeeded by: Daniel Fitzpatrick
- Constituency: Strafford 21

Personal details
- Party: Democratic

Catt Sandler is an American politician from New Hampshire. She served in the New Hampshire House of Representatives.

She is a retired attorney and a veteran of the United States Army Reserve. Sandler endorsed the Joe Biden 2020 presidential campaign.
