= Thomas Walsh (New Hampshire politician) =

American politician

Thomas Walsh is a member the New Hampshire House of Representatives, a position he has held for five terms. He is currently serving as Chair of the House Transportation Committee and as a member of the Special Committee on Housing. He is sitting as a Republican representing Hooksett in the Merrimack 10 district.

== Legislative initiatives ==
In January 2026, Walsh was the primary sponsor of a bill (House Bill 1703) in the New Hampshire House of Representatives that proposed requiring owners of bicycles and electric bicycles to pay a $50 annual state registration fee in order to use state and municipally funded paths, trails, and roadways. Walsh, who serves as chair of the House Transportation Committee and represents Hooksett in the Merrimack 10 district, said he introduced the proposal as a way to help address a projected $400 million shortfall in the state’s 10-year highway funding plan by applying a user-fee funding approach similar to existing registration fees for other vehicles. Critics including cycling advocates and local officials strongly opposed the proposal, arguing that it would burden cyclists and discourage a healthy activity that contributes to the tourism economy. Walsh acknowledged the backlash and indicated the measure was unlikely to advance in its current form.
