= Richard Abel (politician) =

American politician

Member of the New Hampshire House of Representatives from the Grafton 13th district
- In office December 3, 2014 – December 7, 2022

Personal details
- Party: Democratic
- Education: Miami University

Richard M. Abel is a New Hampshire politician.

== Early life ==
Abel attended Miami University.

== Career ==
Abel has served as an associate professor at Franklin Pierce University and as executive director of the University Press of New England. On November 4, 2014, Abel was elected to the New Hampshire House of Representatives where he represents the Grafton 13 district. He assumed office on December 3, 2014 a Democrat.

== Personal life ==
Abel resides in West Lebanon, New Hampshire. Abel is married has two children. He is Jewish.
