= Skip Cleaver =

American politician (1944–2022)

Member of the New Hampshire House of Representatives from the Hillsborough 35th district
- In office December 7, 2016 – June 1, 2022

Personal details
- Born: September 26, 1944 Clearfield, Pennsylvania, U.S.
- Died: December 1, 2022 (aged 78) Keene, New Hampshire, U.S.
- Party: Democratic
- Education: Rivier University

Military service
- Branch/service: United States Marine Corps
- Years of service: 1965–1971

Thornton John Cleaver Jr. (September 26, 1944 – December 1, 2022), better known as Skip Cleaver, was an American politician in the state of New Hampshire.

== Early life ==
Cleaver was born to Electa Mae Curry Cleaver and Thornton John Cleaver Sr. in Clearfield, Pennsylvania on September 26, 1944.

== Education ==
Cleaver earned a B.S. in political science and history and an M.B.A. in international business from Rivier University.

== Military career ==
Cleaver served from 1965 to 1971 in the United States Marine Corps.

== Political career ==
On November 8, 2016, Cleaver was elected to the New Hampshire House of Representatives where he represented the Hillsborough 35 district. Cleaver assumed office in 2016. Cleaver was a Democrat. Cleaver endorsed Bernie Sanders in the 2020 Democratic Party presidential primaries.

== Personal life and death ==
Since 1975 Cleaver resided in Nashua, New Hampshire. Cleaver was married, had three children, and four grandchildren.

Cleaver was a long distance runner and a charter member of the Gate City Striders Running Club in New Hampshire, serving several terms as club president. He was elected to the Gate City Striders Hall of Fame and completed 43 full marathons and 134 mountain races.

Cleaver died in Keene, New Hampshire, on December 1, 2022, at the age of 78.
