= Dennis Green (politician) =

American politician

Member of the New Hampshire House of Representatives
- In office 2015 – December 7, 2022
- Constituency: Rockingham 13

Personal details
- Party: Republican

Dennis E. Green is an American politician from New Hampshire. He served in the New Hampshire House of Representatives.

Green endorsed the Marco Rubio 2016 presidential campaign.
