= Steven Beaudoin =

American politician

Member of New Hampshire House of Representatives for Strafford 9
- In office December 5, 2012 – December 1, 2020
- Succeeded by: Clifford Newton

Personal details
- Party: Republican

Steven P. Beaudoin is an American politician. He was a member of the New Hampshire House of Representatives from 2012 to 2020.

Beaudoin was part of the Donald Trump 2024 presidential campaign in New Hampshire.
