= Jacqueline Chretien =

American politician

Member of the New Hampshire House of Representatives from the Hillsborough 42 district
- Incumbent
- Assumed office December 5, 2018

Personal details
- Party: Democratic
- Education: University of California, Berkeley

Jacqueline Chretien is a New Hampshire politician.

== Education ==
Chretien earned a PhD in molecular and cell biology from the University of California, Berkeley.

== Career ==
On November 6, 2018, Chretien was elected to the New Hampshire House of Representatives where she represents the Hillsborough 42 district. She assumed office on December 5, 2018. She is a Democrat.

== Personal life ==
Chretien resides in Manchester, New Hampshire. Chretien is married and has three children.
