= Dick Barry (New Hampshire politician) =

American politician

Member of New Hampshire House of Representatives for Hillsborough 21
- In office 2010 – December 2, 2020

Personal details
- Party: Republican

Richard "Dick" Barry is an American politician. He was a member of the New Hampshire House of Representatives and represented Hillsborough's 21st district.
