= Patricia Lovejoy =

American politician from New Hampshire

Member of the New Hampshire House of Representatives from the Rockingham 36th district
- In office 2010 – December 1, 2020
- Succeeded by: Alexis Simpson

Personal details
- Party: Democratic

Patricia Lovejoy is an American politician who served in the New Hampshire House of Representatives from 2010 to 2020.

Lovejoy served as senior deputy secretary of state under David Scanlan.
