= Patricia Bushway =

American politician

Member of the New Hampshire House of Representatives
- In office December 5, 2018 – December 1, 2020
- Succeeded by: Tracy Emerick
- Constituency: Rockingham 21

Personal details
- Party: Democratic
- Education: University of New Hampshire

Patricia J. Bushway is an American politician from New Hampshire. She served in the New Hampshire House of Representatives.

Bushway studied at the University of New Hampshire and served 21 years in the U.S. Army as a military intelligence officer, retiring as a lieutenant colonel.
