= James Bosman =

American politician

Member of the New Hampshire House of Representatives from the Hillsborough 38 district
- In office December 5, 2018 – December 1, 2020

Personal details
- Party: Democratic
- Education: Hope College; Bridgewater State University

James Bosman is a New Hampshire politician.

== Education ==
Bosman earned a B.A. from Hope College and a M.E.d. from Bridgewater State University.

== Career ==
On November 6, 2018, Bosman was elected to the New Hampshire House of Representatives where he represents the Hillsborough 38 district. Bosman assumed office on December 5, 2018. Bosman is a Democrat.

== Personal life ==
Bosman resides in Francestown, New Hampshire. Bosman is married.
