= George Saunderson =

American politician

Member of New Hampshire House of Representatives for Merrimack 9
- In office December 5, 2018 – December 2, 2020
- In office 2014–2016

Personal details
- Party: Democratic

George Saunderson is an American politician. He was a member of the New Hampshire House of Representatives and represented Merrimack's 9th district.
