= Debra DeSimone =

American politician

Member of the New Hampshire House of Representatives from the Rockingham 6th district
- In office 2008–2012

Member of the New Hampshire House of Representatives from the Rockingham 14th district
- In office 2012 – December 7, 2022

Member of the New Hampshire House of Representatives from the Rockingham 18th district
- Incumbent
- Assumed office December 7, 2022

Personal details
- Party: Republican

Debra DeSimone is an American politician. She serves as a Republican member for the Rockingham 18th district of the New Hampshire House of Representatives.
