= Sue Mullen =

American politician

Member of the New Hampshire House of Representatives from the Hillsborough 7th district
- In office December 5, 2018 – December 7, 2022
- Preceded by: Bart Fromuth

Personal details
- Party: Democratic
- Profession: Former Teacher

Sue Mullen is an American politician, who was elected to the New Hampshire House of Representatives in the 2018 elections. She represented the Hillsborough 7th District as a member of the Democratic Party.
