= Sherry Dutzy =

American politician

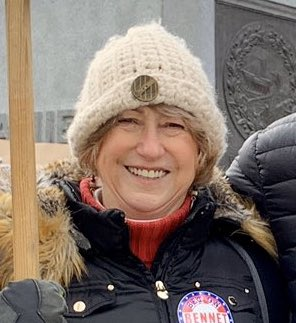

Member of the New Hampshire House of Representatives from the Hillsborough 6th district
- Incumbent
- Assumed office December 6, 2018

Personal details
- Party: Democratic

Sherry Dutzy is an American politician. She is a member of the New Hampshire House of Representatives, where she represents Hillsborough County District 6. She is a Democrat.

== Political career ==
Dutzy was elected in 2018 as part of the Democratic blue wave that swept the United States, including New Hampshire.

In 2019, Dutzy voted in favor of HB 564, a gun control law that bans firearms being carried on public school property in New Hampshire.

She endorsed Michael Bennet during the 2020 democratic primaries.
