= Kenneth Vincent =

American politician

Member of the New Hampshire House of Representatives from the Strafford 17th district
- In office 2016 – December 7, 2022

Member of the New Hampshire House of Representatives from the Strafford 12th district
- Incumbent
- Assumed office December 7, 2022

Personal details
- Party: Democratic

Kenneth Vincent is an American politician. He serves as a Democratic member for the Strafford 12th district of the New Hampshire House of Representatives.
