= Katherine Prudhomme O'Brien =

American politician

Member of the New Hampshire House of Representatives from the Rockingham 13th district
- Incumbent
- Assumed office December 7, 2022

Member of the New Hampshire House of Representatives from the Rockingham 6th district
- In office December 5, 2018 – December 7, 2022
- In office December 3, 2014 – December 7, 2016

Personal details
- Party: Republican

Katherine Prudhomme O'Brien is an American politician. She serves as a Republican member for the Rockingham 13th district of the New Hampshire House of Representatives.
