= John Graham (New Hampshire politician) =

American politician

Member of New Hampshire House of Representatives for Hillsborough 7
- In office 2016 – December 7, 2022

Member of New Hampshire House of Representatives for Hillsborough 7
- In office 2000–2014

Personal details
- Party: Republican

John A. Graham is an American politician. He was a member of the New Hampshire House of Representatives.
