= David Lundgren =

American politician

Member of the New Hampshire House of Representatives from the Rockingham 3rd district
- In office 2010–2012

Member of the New Hampshire House of Representatives from the Rockingham 5th district
- In office 2012 – December 7, 2022

Member of the New Hampshire House of Representatives from the Rockingham 16th district
- Incumbent
- Assumed office December 7, 2022

Personal details
- Party: Republican

David Lundgren is an American politician.

== Professional career ==
He serves as a Republican member for the Rockingham 16th district of the New Hampshire House of Representatives.
