= Cody Belanger =

American politician

Member of the New Hampshire House of Representatives
- In office December 2, 2020 – December 7, 2022
- Constituency: Rockingham 8

Personal details
- Party: Republican
- Website: www.belangerfornh.com

Cody M. Belanger is an American politician from New Hampshire. He served in the New Hampshire House of Representatives.
