= John Sytek =

American politician (born 1943)

Member of the New Hampshire House of Representatives from the Rockingham 8 district
- Incumbent
- Assumed office 2010

Personal details
- Born: March 19, 1943 (age 83) Philadelphia, Pennsylvania, U.S.
- Party: Republican
- Spouse: Donna
- Education: Massachusetts Institute of Technology
- Occupation: Teacher, real estate developer

John Sytek (born March 19, 1943) is an American politician in the state of New Hampshire.

== Professional career ==
He is a member of the New Hampshire House of Representatives, sitting as a Republican from the Rockingham 8 district, having been first elected in 2010. He previously served from 1990 to 1996.
