= Douglas Trottier =

American politician

Member of the New Hampshire House of Representatives from the Belknap 6th district
- Incumbent
- Assumed office December 2, 2020
- Preceded by: John Plumer
- Succeeded by: Cameron Thompson (elect)

Personal details
- Born: c. 1971 (age 54–55)
- Party: Republican

Douglas R. Trottier (c. 1971) is a New Hampshire politician.

== Early life ==
Trottier was born around 1971. As of September 2020, Trottier is taking law classes online.

== Career ==
Trottier is a retired police officer. He has a 27 year law enforcement career. In 2019, Trottier unsuccessfully ran for the board of selectmen of Belmont, New Hampshire. On September 8, 2020, Trottier won the Republican primary for the New Hampshire House of Representatives alongside Michael Sylvia. On November 3, 2020, Trottier was elected to the New Hampshire House of Representatives where he represents the Belknap 6 district. He assumed office on December 2, 2020.

== Personal life ==
Trottier resides in Belmont, New Hampshire. Trottier is married and has five children.
