= Bob L'Heureux =

American politician

Member of the New Hampshire House of Representatives from the 21st Hillsborough district
- In office December 7, 2016 – December 2, 2020
- Preceded by: Phil Straight

Member of the New Hampshire House of Representatives from the 19th Hillsborough district
- In office 1990–2010

Personal details
- Born: May 27, 1940 (age 86) Manchester, New Hampshire, US
- Party: Republican

Robert L'Heureux (born May 27, 1940) is an American politician in the state of New Hampshire. He was a member of the New Hampshire House of Representatives, sitting as a Republican from the Hillsborough 21 district from 2016 to 2020. He previously served from 1990 to 2010.
