= Janice Schmidt =

American politician

Jan Schmidt

Member of the New Hampshire House of Representatives from the Hillsborough 28th district
- In office December 2016 – December 7, 2022
- In office December 2012 – December 2014

Personal details
- Party: Democratic

Janice "Jan" Schmidt is a New Hampshire politician.

== Education ==
Schmidt has an associates degree in business.

== Professional career ==
Schmidt represented the Hillsborough 28 district from 2012 to 2014. In 2016, Schmidt was again elected to the New Hampshire House of Representatives where she represents the Hillsborough 28 district. Schmidt is a Democrat. Schmidt endorsed Bernie Sanders in the 2020 Democratic Party presidential primaries.

In 2017, Schmidt was also elected to the Nashua Board of Aldermen as the Ward 1 Alderman. She was reelected to this position in 2019.

== Personal life ==
Schmidt resides in Nashua, New Hampshire. Schmidt is married and has two children.
