= Larry Laflamme =

American politician

Member of the New Hampshire House of Representatives
- In office 2016 – December 7, 2022
- Constituency: Coos 3

Personal details
- Party: Democratic

Larry L. Laflamme is an American politician from New Hampshire. He served in the New Hampshire House of Representatives.
