= Peter Spanos =

American politician

Member of the Belknap County Commission from the 1st district
- Incumbent
- Assumed office January 2021
- Preceded by: David Devoy

Member of the New Hampshire House of Representatives from the Belknap 3rd district
- In office December 3, 2014 – December 2, 2020

Personal details
- Born: Laconia, New Hampshire
- Party: Republican
- Spouse: Sharon
- Education: Skidmore College; University of New Hampshire

Peter John Spanos is a New Hampshire politician who formerly served in the New Hampshire House of Representatives.
