= Michael O'Brien (New Hampshire politician) =

American politician

Member of the New Hampshire House of Representatives from the Hillsborough 10th district

Personal details
- Party: Democratic

Michael O'Brien is an American politician. He serves as a Democratic member for the Hillsborough 10th district of the New Hampshire House of Representatives. O'Brien also serves as a Nashua, New Hampshire Alderman. In January 2024 he was elected Vice President of Nashua's board of aldermen.

== Personal life ==
O'Brien resides in Nashua, New Hampshire. O'Brien is married and has three children and 4 grandchildren. O'Brien is a retired fire chief.

== Political career ==
O'Brien was first elected to the New Hampshire House of Representatives in 2008. He lost re-election in 2010. He was reelected in 2012 and has served since. He currently serves as Democratic member for the Hillsborough 10th district. He serves on the Executive Departments and Administration Committee. He previously served on the Transportation Committee during the 2009-2010 Biennium and again from 2015-2020. When Democrats had control of the house during the 2019-2020 biennium O'Brien served as vice chair of the Transportation Committee.

O'Brien has served on the City of Nashua board of aldermen since 2016. O'Brien currently serves as vice president of the board of aldermen.

== Controversy ==
In January 2024 John Formella, the attorney general of New Hampshire accused O'Brien, two other aldermen, and the mayor of Nashua of violating the state's anti-electioneering statute. Formella issued an order instructing the four politicians to cease and desist from violating the law.
