= Chris True =

American politician

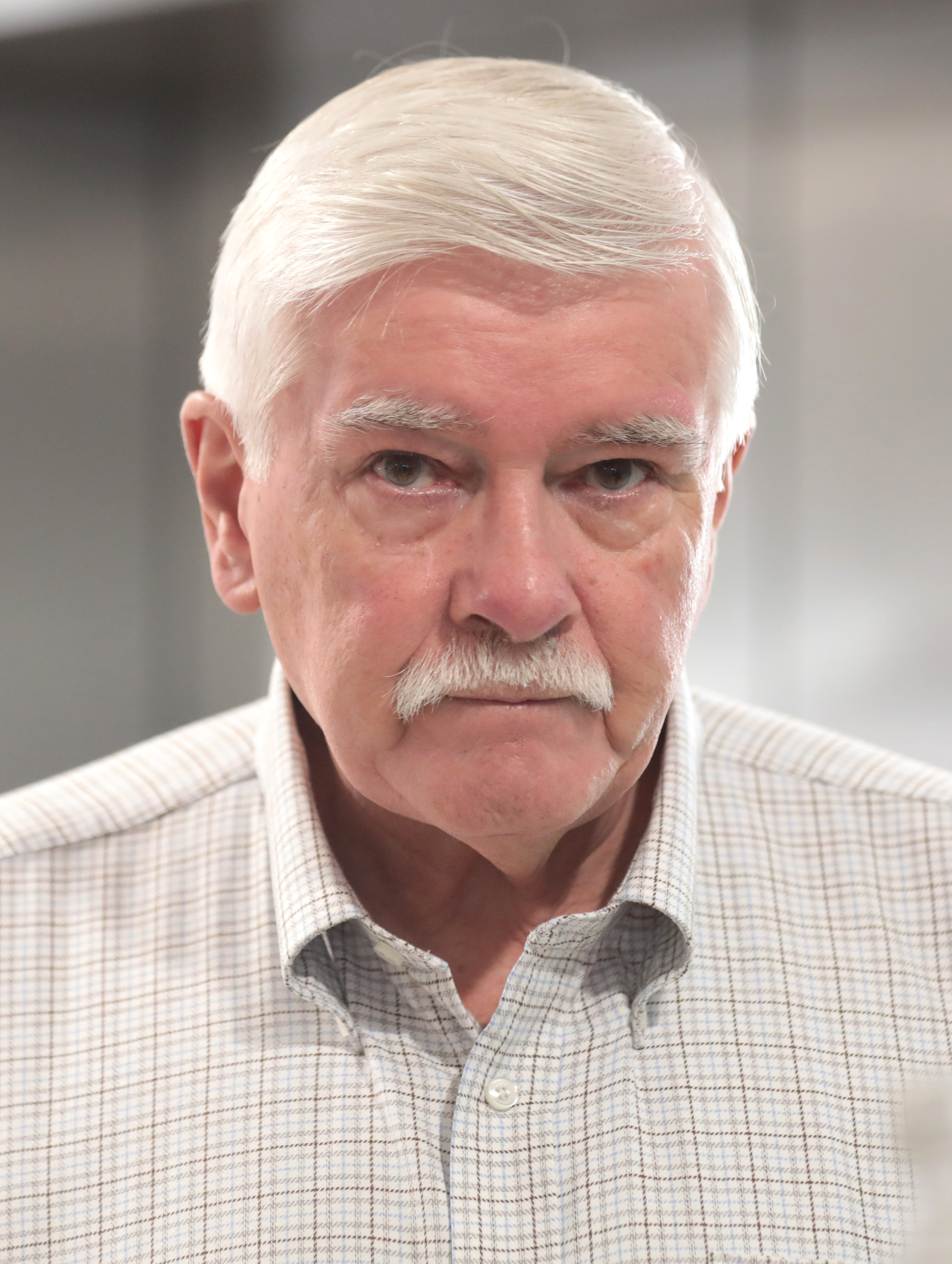
- True in 2022

Member of the New Hampshire House of Representatives from the Rockingham 9th district
- Incumbent
- Assumed office December 7, 2022

Member of the New Hampshire House of Representatives from the Rockingham 4th district
- In office December 3, 2014 – December 7, 2022

Personal details
- Party: Republican

Chris True is an American politician. He serves as a Republican member for the Rockingham 9th district of the New Hampshire House of Representatives.
