= Rebecca McBeath =

American politician

Member of the New Hampshire House of Representatives from the Rockingham 26th district
- In office 2014 – December 7, 2022

Member of the New Hampshire House of Representatives from the Rockingham 28th district
- Incumbent
- Assumed office December 7, 2022

Personal details
- Party: Democratic

Rebecca McBeath is an American politician. She serves as a Democratic member for the Rockingham 28th district of the New Hampshire House of Representatives.
