= Susan Homola =

American politician

Member of the New Hampshire House of Representatives
- In office December 2, 2020 – December 7, 2022
- Constituency: Hillsborough District 27

Personal details
- Party: Republican
- Education: Arizona State University; University of Oklahoma

Susan (Sue) E. Homola is an American politician from New Hampshire. She served in the New Hampshire House of Representatives.

She graduated from Arizona State University and the University of Oklahoma.
