= James Horgan (politician) =

American politician

Member of the New Hampshire House of Representatives from the Strafford 2nd district
- In office 2016 – December 7, 2022

Member of the New Hampshire House of Representatives from the Strafford 1st district
- Incumbent
- Assumed office December 7, 2022

Personal details
- Party: Republican

James Horgan is an American politician. He serves as a Republican member for the Strafford 1st district of the New Hampshire House of Representatives.
