= Mary Jane Mulligan =

American politician

Member of New Hampshire House of Representatives for Grafton 12
- In office 2016 – December 2, 2020
- Succeeded by: Russell Muirhead

Personal details
- Party: Democratic

Mary Jane Mulligan is an American politician. She was a member of the New Hampshire House of Representatives and represented Grafton's 12th district.
