= Jeffrey Salloway =

American politician

Jeffrey Salloway is an American scientist and politician who served in the New Hampshire House of Representatives from 2016 to 2022. A member of the Democratic Party, he represented Strafford County's 5th District until he chose not to seek re-election in 2022. Previously, Salloway was a professor of epidemiology at New Hampshire University. He is currently a professor emeritus. In December 2023, Salloway filed to run for his old New Hampshire House seat in a 2024 special election.

Salloway spent an academic career teaching in medical schools and community health. He was a researcher and published widely in preventive medicine, Alzheimer's, organ donation, health care systems, and environmental health. Later he began writing a number of novels.
