= Dan Pickering =

American politician

Member of the New Hampshire House of Representatives from the Hillsborough 3rd district
- In office December 5, 2018 – November 12, 2021
- Preceded by: Jonathan Manley

Personal details
- Party: Democratic

Daniel Pickering is a New Hampshire politician.

== Career ==
Pickering has worked as a teacher and as the treasurer of the Hancock Town Democratic Committee. On November 6, 2018, Pickering was elected to the New Hampshire House of Representatives where he represented the Hillsborough 3 district. He assumed office on December 5, 2018 and resigned on November 12, 2021. He is a Democrat.

== Personal life ==
Pickering resides in Hancock, New Hampshire. Pickering is married.
