= Deb Hobson =

American politician

Member of the New Hampshire House of Representatives from the Rockingham 14th district
- Incumbent
- Assumed office December 7, 2022

Member of the New Hampshire House of Representatives from the Rockingham 35th district
- In office December 5, 2018 – December 7, 2022

Personal details
- Party: Republican

Deborah Hobson is an American politician. She serves as a Republican member for the Rockingham 14th district of the New Hampshire House of Representatives.
