= Gary Hopper =

American politician

Member of New Hampshire House of Representatives for Hillsborough 2
- In office 2008 – December 7, 2022

Member of New Hampshire House of Representatives for Hillsborough 7
- In office 2000–2004

Personal details
- Party: Republican

Gary S. Hopper is an American politician. He was a member of the New Hampshire House of Representatives.
