= Everett McBride =

American politician

Member of the New Hampshire House of Representatives
- In office December 5, 2018 – December 7, 2022
- Constituency: Rockingham 8

Personal details
- Party: Republican
- Education: University of Massachusetts Lowell

Everett P. McBride, Jr. is an American politician from New Hampshire. He served in the New Hampshire House of Representatives.
