= Bob Backus (politician) =

American politician

Member of the New Hampshire House of Representatives from the Hillsborough 19th district
- In office December 5, 2012 – December 2, 2020

Personal details
- Party: Democratic
- Education: Wesleyan University (BA); Harvard Law School (JD)

Bob Backus is a Democratic member politician who served in the New Hampshire House of Representatives from 2012 to 2020, where he represented the Hillsborough 19 district.
