= Joyce Weston =

American politician

Member of the New Hampshire House of Representatives from the Grafton 8th district
- In office December 2018 – December 7, 2022

Personal details
- Born: October 7, 1949 (age 76) Nashua, NH
- Party: Democratic
- Spouse: Sally S. Widerstrom
- Profession: Graphic Design; Book designer

Joyce Weston (born October 7, 1949) is an American politician, who was elected to the New Hampshire House of Representatives in the 2018 elections. She represented the Grafton 8th District (Plymouth, Hebron, Holderness) as a member of the Democratic Party.
