= Dick Marston =

American politician

Member of New Hampshire House of Representatives for Hillsborough 19
- In office December 2, 2020 – December 7, 2022

Personal details
- Party: Republican

Dick Marston is an American politician. He was a member of the New Hampshire House of Representatives and represented Hillsborough's 19th district.
