= Sandy Swinburne =

American politician

Member of New Hampshire House of Representatives for Cheshire 10
- In office December 5, 2018 – December 2, 2020
- Preceded by: Marge Shepardson
- Succeeded by: Lucius Parshall

Personal details
- Party: Democratic

Sandy Swinburne is an American politician. She was a member of the New Hampshire House of Representatives and represented Cheshire's 10th district.
