= Mary Eisner =

American politician

Member of New Hampshire House of Representatives for Rockingham 6
- In office December 5, 2018 – December 1, 2020

Personal details
- Party: Democratic

Mary A. Eisner is an American politician. She was a member of the New Hampshire House of Representatives and represented Rockingham's 6th district.
