= Brian Chirichiello =

American politician

Member of New Hampshire House of Representatives for Rockingham 6
- In office 2010 – December 1, 2020

Member-elect of the New Hampshire House of Representatives from the Rockingham 13th district
- Incumbent
- Assumed office December 2026

Personal details
- Party: Republican

Brian K. Chirichiello is an American politician. He was a member of the New Hampshire House of Representatives and represented Rockingham 6th district. He was re-elected in 2026 for the Rockingham 13th district.

Chirichiello was a candidate for Rockingham County Commission - District 2 in 2024.
