= Carol McGuire =

New Hampshire politician

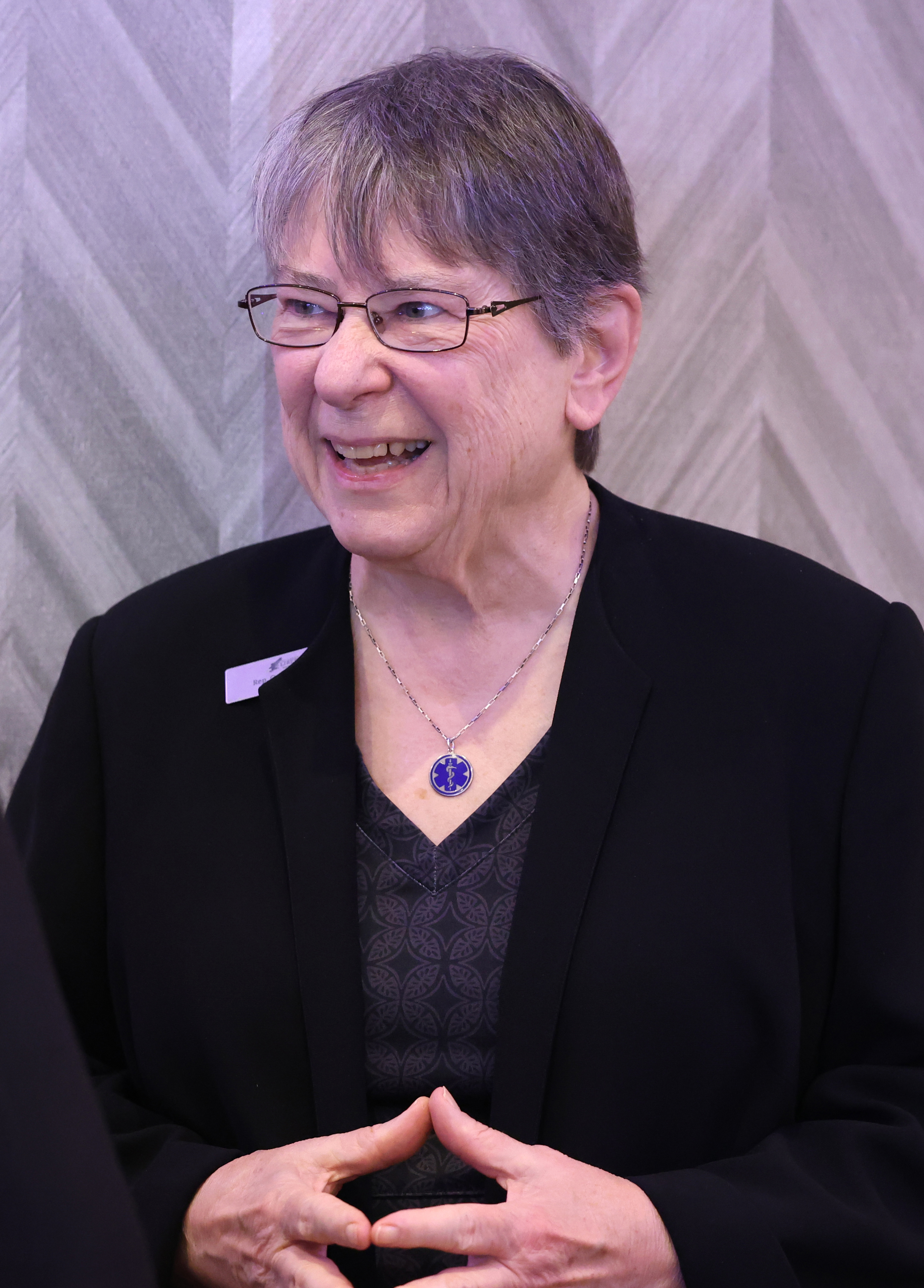
McGuire at the 2024 Hazlitt Summit hosted by Young Americans for Liberty Foundation

Carol McGuire is an American politician who has represented the Merrimack 29th district of the New Hampshire House of Representatives since 2008.
