= Richard Lascelles =

American politician

Member of the New Hampshire House of Representatives from the Hillsborough 14th district
- Incumbent
- Assumed office December 7, 2022

Member of the New Hampshire House of Representatives from the Hillsborough 20th district
- In office December 7, 2016 – December 7, 2022

Personal details
- Party: Republican

Richard Lascelles is an American politician. He serves as a Republican member for the Hillsborough 14th district of the New Hampshire House of Representatives.

== Early life ==
Lascelles was born on a farm in the Midwest. He served in the United States Navy Submarine Force, and is now a totally disabled veteran.

== New Hampshire House of Representatives ==
Lascelles was first elected to the New Hampshire House of Representatives in 2016. He serves on the Criminal Justice and Public Safety Committee.

== Personal life ==
Lascelles is married and has four children and five grandchildren.
