= Charlotte DiLorenzo =

American politician

Member of the New Hampshire House of Representatives from the Rockingham 10th district
- Incumbent
- Assumed office December 7, 2022

Member of the New Hampshire House of Representatives from the Rockingham 17th district
- In office December 7, 2016 – December 7, 2022

Personal details
- Party: Democratic

Charlotte DiLorenzo is an American politician. She serves as a Democratic member for the Rockingham 10th district of the New Hampshire House of Representatives.
