= Timothy Fontneau =

American politician

Tim Fontneau

Member of the New Hampshire House of Representatives from the Strafford 7th district
- In office December 2016 – December 7, 2022
- Preceded by: Audrey Stevens

Personal details
- Party: Democratic

Timothy Fontneau is a New Hampshire politician.

== Political career ==
On November 8, 2016, Fontneau was elected to the New Hampshire House of Representatives where he represents the Strafford 7 district. Fontneau assumed office in 2016. Fontneau is a Democrat.

== Personal life ==
Fontneau resides in Rochester, New Hampshire. Fontneau is married and has two children.
