= Charlie Burns (politician) =

American politician

Member of New Hampshire House of Representatives for Hillsborough 23
- In office 2016 – May 12, 2020

Personal details
- Party: Republican

Charles (Charlie) Burns is an American politician. He was a member of the New Hampshire House of Representatives and represented Hillsborough 23rd district.
