= Skip Berrien =

American politician

Member of New Hampshire House of Representatives for Rockingham 18
- In office December 3, 2014 – December 1, 2020
- Succeeded by: Mark Paige

Personal details
- Party: Democratic
- Education: Boston University School of Medicine

Skip Berrien is an American politician. He was a member of the New Hampshire House of Representatives and represented Rockingham 18th district.
