= Deb Stevens =

American politician

Member of the New Hampshire House of Representatives from the Hillsborough 34th district
- In office December 5, 2018 – December 7, 2022

Personal details
- Party: Democratic

Deb Stevens is a New Hampshire politician.

== Career ==
On November 8, 2016, Stevens was elected to the New Hampshire House of Representatives where she represents the Hillsborough 34 district. She assumed office on December 5, 2018. She is a Democrat.

== Personal life ==
Stevens resides in Nashua, New Hampshire.
