= John Bordenet =

American politician

Member of the New Hampshire House of Representatives from the Cheshire 5th district
- In office 2014–2022

Personal details
- Party: Democratic

John Bordenet is an American politician. A member of the Democratic Party, he served in the New Hampshire House of Representatives from 2014 to 2022.
