= Mary Freitas =

American politician

Member of the New Hampshire House of Representatives from the Hillsborough 14th district
- In office December 3, 2014 – December 7, 2022

Member of the New Hampshire House of Representatives from the Hillsborough 26th district
- Incumbent
- Assumed office December 7, 2022

Personal details
- Party: Democratic

Mary Freitas is an American politician. She serves as a Democratic member for the Hillsborough 26th district of the New Hampshire House of Representatives.
