= Kevin Craig (New Hampshire politician) =

American politician

Member of New Hampshire House of Representatives for Coos 4
- In office December 5, 2018 – December 7, 2022

Personal details
- Party: Republican
- Education: Arkansas Tech University

Kevin Craig is an American politician. He was a member of the New Hampshire House of Representatives and represented Coos 4th district.
