= Beth Richards =

American politician

Member of the New Hampshire House of Representatives from the Merrimack 13th district
- Incumbent
- Assumed office December 2016
- Preceded by: June Frazer

Personal details
- Party: Democratic

Beth Richards is a New Hampshire politician.

== Career ==
On November 8, 2016, Richards was elected to the New Hampshire House of Representatives where she represents the Merrimack 13 district. She assumed office later in 2016. She is a Democrat.

== Personal life ==
Richards resides in Concord, New Hampshire. Richards has two children.
