= David Woodbury =

American politician

Member of the New Hampshire House of Representatives from the 5th Hillsborough district
- In office December 5, 2018 – December 1, 2020
- Preceded by: Glen Dickey
- In office 2012–2016
- Succeeded by: Glen Dickey

Personal details
- Party: Democratic
- Education: University of Pennsylvania; University of Michigan

David Woodbury is a New Hampshire politician.

== Education ==
Woodbury earned a BA from University of Pennsylvania in 1966 and a JD from University of Michigan.

== Career ==
Woodbury has been a member of the New Hampshire Bar since 1969. Woodbury served on the New Boston Conservation Commission from 1978 to 1990. In 1984, Woobury was a delegate to the New Hampshire Constitutional Convention. Woodbury served on the New Boston Solid Waste Committee from 1991 to 1994. Woodbury served as a New Boston selectman from 2001 to 2010.

On November 6, 2012, Woodbury was elected to the New Hampshire House of Representatives where he represented the Hillsborough 5 district until 2016. On November 8, 2016, Woodbury was not reelected to this position. On November 6, 2018, Woodbury regained his prior seat, and has been representing the Hillsborough 5 distinct ever since. He is a Democrat.

== Personal life ==
Woodbury resides in New Boston, New Hampshire. Woodbury is married and has three children.
