= Greg Hill (politician) =

American politician

Member of the New Hampshire House of Representatives
- Incumbent
- Assumed office December 1, 2010

Personal details
- Party: Republican

Gregory Hill is an American politician. He serves as a Republican member for the Merrimack 2nd district of the New Hampshire House of Representatives. He currently is the chair of the Legislative Administration Committee.

== Personal life ==
Hill resides in Northfield, New Hampshire. Hill is married and has a child.

== Political career ==
Hill has served in the New Hampshire House of Representatives since 2010. Hill chairs the Legislative Administration Committee and also serves on the Transportation Committee.
