= Lee Oxenham =

American politician

Member of New Hampshire House of Representatives for Sullivan 1
- In office December 3, 2014 – December 7, 2022

Personal details
- Party: Democratic

Lee Walker Oxenham is an American politician. She was a member of the New Hampshire House of Representatives and represented Sullivan's 1st district.
