= Mark Proulx =

American politician

Member of the New Hampshire House of Representatives from the Hillsborough 15th district
- Incumbent
- Assumed office December 7, 2022
- In office December 1, 2010 – December 5, 2012

Member of the New Hampshire House of Representatives from the Hillsborough 44th district
- In office December 3, 2014 – December 2, 2020

Personal details
- Party: Republican

Mark Proulx is an American politician. He serves as a Republican member for the Hillsborough 15th district of the New Hampshire House of Representatives.

Proulx served on the Nashua Fire Department for thirty years and retired as a lieutenant. He also worked as a private EMT for twenty-five years. Proulx is the Deputy Chief of the Epping Fire Department.
