= Donna Ellis =

American politician

Member of the New Hampshire House of Representatives
- In office 2016 – December 7, 2022
- Succeeded by: Chuck Grassie
- Constituency: Strafford 8

Personal details
- Party: Democratic

Donna R. Ellis is an American politician from New Hampshire. She served in the New Hampshire House of Representatives.
