= George Feeney (politician) =

American politician

Member of the New Hampshire House of Representatives from the Belknap 5 district
- Incumbent
- Assumed office 2018

Personal details
- Party: Republican
- Spouse: Priscilla Feeney
- Children: 1
- Education: Newbury College

Military service
- Allegiance: United States
- Branch/service: United States Army
- Years of service: 1968-1970

George Feeney is a New Hampshire politician, and currently serves in the New Hampshire House of Representatives.

Feeney has been serving in the New Hampshire House of Representatives since 2018. He served in the United States Army from 1968 to 1970 and attended Newbury College.
