= Patricia Klee =

American politician

Member of the New Hampshire House of Representatives from the Hillsborough 30th district
- In office December 2016 – December 7, 2022

Personal details
- Party: Democratic

Patricia S. Klee is a New Hampshire politician. She was a member of the New Hampshire House of Representatives representing Hillsboroughs 30th District from 2016 to 2022.

== Career ==
On November 8, 2016, Klee was elected to the New Hampshire House of Representatives where she represents the Hillsborough 30 district. She assumed office later in 2016. She is a Democrat. Klee is also currently serves the Nashua Board of Aldermen where she represents the 3rd ward.

== Personal life ==
Klee resides in Nashua, New Hampshire.
