= Jim Fedolfi =

American politician

Member of the New Hampshire House of Representatives from the Hillsborough 4th district
- Incumbent
- Assumed office December 2016
- Preceded by: Gilman Shattuck

Personal details
- Party: Republican

James Fedolfi is a New Hampshire politician, who as of 2020 serves in the New Hampshire House of Representatives.
