= Anne Warner (New Hampshire politician) =

American politician

Member of the New Hampshire House of Representatives
- In office December 5, 2018 – December 1, 2020
- Constituency: Rockingham 5

Personal details
- Born: August 16, 1943
- Died: June 20, 2021 (aged 77)
- Party: Democratic

Anne Warner (August 16, 1943 - June 20, 2021) was an American politician from New Hampshire. She served in the New Hampshire House of Representatives.
