= Joel Desilets =

American politician

Member of New Hampshire House of Representatives for Rockingham 7
- In office December 5, 2018 – December 1, 2020

Personal details
- Party: Republican
- Website: joeldesilets.com

Joel M. Desilets is an American politician. He was a member of the New Hampshire House of Representatives and represented Rockingham 7th district.

Desilets was a member of the Windham Board of Selectmen. He was charged with assault in 2017. He was found not guilty.
