= Bob Greene (politician) =

American politician

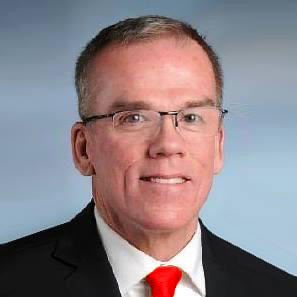
- Official New Hampshire portrait of Bob Greene.

Member of the New Hampshire House of Representatives from the Hillsborough 37th district
- In office December 2018 – May 27, 2022

Personal details
- Party: Republican

Bob Greene is an American politician. A Republican, Greene was active in New Hampshire, and before moving to Florida and becoming the Republican State Committeeman for Sumter County in 2024.

== Early life and education ==
Greene was born in Chicago, Illinois and raised in Wisconsin and later earned his bachelor's degree from Lawrence University and his master's degree from the University of Northern Colorado.

== Career ==
=== Military ===
Greene served in the United States Air Force from 1987 to 2007 and was stationed at Chanute Air Force Base, Scott Air Force Base, Ramstein Air Base, and Hanscom Air Force Base.

After retiring from the Air Force, Greene worked for Raytheon Technologies and BAE Systems, where he retired in 2019.

=== New Hampshire House of Representatives ===
On November 6, 2018, Greene was elected to the New Hampshire House of Representatives where he represents the Hillsborough 37 district (Hudson and Pelham). He assumed office later in 2018 and served two terms ending in May 2022.

==== Committee assignments ====
Greene served on the Legislative Administration Committee as the Vice Chair and on the Judiciary Committee.

=== Florida ===
Greene moved to The Villages, Florida in 2022 after serving two terms in the New Hampshire House of Representatives. In 2024, he decided to run for the office of Republican State Committeeman for Sumter County and won the election on August 20 in the primary over Jerry Prince.

Sumter County Republican State Committeeman, 2024
Party	Candidate	Votes	%
Republican	Bob Greene	16,723	65
Republican	Jerry Prince	9,017	35

== Personal life ==
Greene was a 17-year resident of Hudson, New Hampshire, and now resides in The Villages, Florida. He is married to his wife Kathy of 32 years.
