= Walter Kolodziej =

American politician

Member of New Hampshire House of Representatives for Rockingham 7
- In office 2008 – December 1, 2020

Personal details
- Party: Republican

Walter Kolodziej is an American politician. He was a member of the New Hampshire House of Representatives and represented Rockingham 7th district.
