= Betty Gay =

American politician

Member of the New Hampshire House of Representatives
- In office 2016 – December 7, 2022
- Constituency: Rockingham 8

Personal details
- Party: Republican

Betty Irene Gay is an American politician from New Hampshire. She served in the New Hampshire House of Representatives.
