= Melissa Blasek =

American politician

Member of the New Hampshire House of Representatives from the Hillsborough 21st district
- In office December 2, 2020 – December 7, 2022

Personal details
- Born: Derry, New Hampshire, U.S.
- Party: Republican
- Spouse: Married
- Children: 1
- Education: Berklee College of Music
- Profession: Musician

Melissa Blasek is an American politician in the state of New Hampshire. She was a member of the New Hampshire House of Representatives, sitting as a Republican from the Hillsborough-21 multi-member district from 2020 to 2022.

== Career ==
Blasek graduated summa cum laude from Berklee College of Music in Massachusetts. She taught private voice, guitar and piano lessons in southern New Hampshire.

Blasek has been among a group of Republican representatives opposed to the way the Sununu administration has handled the COVID-19 pandemic in New Hampshire. Blasek is a leader in the organization RebuildNH, which is opposed to vaccine mandates and believes that masks should be optional for children in schools.
