= Mark King (politician) =

American politician

Member of the New Hampshire House of Representatives from the Hillsborough 33rd district
- In office December 7, 2016 – December 7, 2022

Personal details
- Party: Democratic
- Education: George Mason University; National Labor College

Mark R. King is a New Hampshire politician.

== Education ==
King graduated from George Mason University with an M.S. in organizational development knowledge management and a B.A. in labor studies from National Labor College in White Oak, Maryland.

== Career ==
On November 8, 2016, King was elected to the New Hampshire House of Representatives where he represents the Hillsborough 33 district. King assumed office in 2016. King is a Democrat. King endorsed Bernie Sanders in the 2020 Democratic Party presidential primaries.

== Personal life ==
King resides in Nashua, New Hampshire.
