= Michael Gunski =

American politician

Member of New Hampshire House of Representatives for Hillsborough 6
- In office December 5, 2018 – July 28, 2021

Personal details
- Party: Republican

Michael Gunski is an American politician. He was a member of the New Hampshire House of Representatives and represented Hillsborough's 6th district.
