= Robert Elliott (New Hampshire politician) =

American politician

Member of the New Hampshire House of Representatives
- In office 2006 – December 7, 2022
- Constituency: Rockingham 8

Personal details
- Party: Republican
- Education: Boston University; Santa Clara University

Robert "Bob" Elliott is an American politician from New Hampshire. He served in the New Hampshire House of Representatives from 2006 to 2022 as a Republican representing the Rockingham 8 district.

Elliott endorsed the Newt Gingrich 2012 presidential campaign.
