= David Welch (New Hampshire politician) =

American politician

Member of the New Hampshire House of Representatives from the Rockingham 13th district
- Incumbent
- Assumed office 2014

Personal details
- Born: February 16, 1940 (age 86) Haverhill, Massachusetts, U.S.
- Party: Republican
- Education: Northern Essex Community College

David Welch (born February 16, 1940) is an American politician in the state of New Hampshire. He is a member of the New Hampshire House of Representatives, sitting as a Republican from the Rockingham 13 district, having been first elected in 2010. He previously served from 1984 to 2012.
