= Peter Hayward (politician) =

American politician

Member of New Hampshire House of Representatives for Strafford 1
- In office December 5, 2018 – December 7, 2022

Personal details
- Party: Republican

Peter T. Hayward is an American politician. He was a member of the New Hampshire House of Representatives.
