= Frank Kotowski =

American politician

Member of the New Hampshire House of Representatives from the Merrimack 24 district
- In office 2008 – December 2, 2020

Personal details
- Born: September 30, 1935 (age 90) Boulder, Colorado, U.S.
- Party: Republican

Frank Richard Kotowski (born September 30, 1935) is an American politician in the state of New Hampshire. He is a member of the New Hampshire House of Representatives, sitting as a Republican from the Merrimack 24 district, having been first elected in 2008.
