= Mary Mayville =

American politician

Member of the New Hampshire House of Representatives
- In office December 2, 2020 – December 7, 2022
- Constituency: Hillsborough 21

Personal details
- Party: Republican

Mary L. Mayville is an American politician from New Hampshire. She served in the New Hampshire House of Representatives.

Mayville endorsed the Nikki Haley 2024 presidential campaign.
