= Arthur Barnes (New Hampshire politician) =

American politician

Member of New Hampshire House of Representatives for Rockingham 8
- In office December 3, 2014 – December 1, 2020

Personal details
- Party: Republican

Arthur E. Barnes III is an American politician. He was a member of the New Hampshire House of Representatives and represented Rockingham 8th district.
