= Raymond Howard (New Hampshire politician) =

American politician

Member of New Hampshire House of Representatives for Belknap 8
- In office December 3, 2014 – July 18, 2022

Personal details
- Party: Republican

Raymond Howard Jr. is an American politician. He was a member of the New Hampshire House of Representatives and represented Belknap 8th district.
