= Jacqueline Cali-Pitts =

American politician (born 1946)

Member of the New Hampshire House of Representatives from the Rockingham 30th district
- In office December 1998 – December 7, 2022

Personal details
- Born: September 17, 1946 (age 80) New York City, U.S.
- Party: Democratic
- Education: University of New Hampshire, Notre Dame College

Jacqueline Cali-Pitts (born September 17, 1946) is an American politician in the state of New Hampshire. She is a former member of the New Hampshire House of Representatives, sitting as a Democrat from the Rockingham 30 district, having been first elected in 1998.
