= J.P. Marzullo =

American politician

Member of New Hampshire House of Representatives for Hillsborough 2
- In office December 5, 2018 – December 2, 2020
- Succeeded by: Leah Cushman

Personal details
- Party: Republican

J.P. Marzullo is an American politician. He was a member of the New Hampshire House of Representatives and represented Hillsborough's 2nd district.
