= Jason Janvrin =

American politician

Member of the New Hampshire House of Representatives from the Rockingham 20th district
- In office 2016–2018

Member of the New Hampshire House of Representatives from the Rockingham 37th district
- In office 2018–2020

Member of the New Hampshire House of Representatives from the Rockingham 40th district
- Incumbent
- Assumed office December 7, 2022

Personal details
- Party: Republican

Jason Janvrin is an American politician. He serves as a Republican member for the Rockingham 40th district of the New Hampshire House of Representatives.
