= Brett Hall =

American politician

Member of New Hampshire House of Representatives for Hillsborough 26
- In office December 5, 2018 – December 2, 2020

Personal details
- Party: Democratic

Brett Hall is an American politician. He was a member of the New Hampshire House of Representatives and represented Hillsborough 26th district.
