= Karel Crawford =

American politician

Member of the New Hampshire House of Representatives from the Carroll 4th district
- In office December 5, 2012 – December 7, 2022

Member of the New Hampshire House of Representatives from the Carroll 3rd district
- Incumbent
- Assumed office December 7, 2022

Personal details
- Party: Republican

Karel Crawford is an American politician. She serves as a Republican member for the Carroll 3rd district of the New Hampshire House of Representatives.
