= Christy Bartlett =

American politician

Member of New Hampshire House of Representatives for Merrimack 19
- In office December 5, 2012 – December 7, 2022
- Succeeded by: Mary Jane Wallner

Personal details
- Party: Democratic
- Education: University of New Hampshire

Christy Dolat Bartlett is an American politician. She was a member of the New Hampshire House of Representatives.

She is a graduate of the University of New Hampshire. She is a retired commercial property and casualty underwriter.
