= David Milz =

American politician

Member of the New Hampshire House of Representatives from the Rockingham 6th district
- In office 2012 – December 7, 2022

Member of the New Hampshire House of Representatives from the Rockingham 13th district
- Incumbent
- Assumed office December 7, 2022

Personal details
- Party: Republican

David Milz is an American politician. He serves as a Republican member for the Rockingham 13th district of the New Hampshire House of Representatives.
