= Christopher Herbert (politician) =

American politician

Member of the New Hampshire House of Representatives from the Hillsborough 24th district
- Incumbent
- Assumed office December 7, 2022

Member of the New Hampshire House of Representatives from the Hillsborough 43rd district
- In office December 3, 2014 – December 7, 2022

Personal details
- Party: Democratic

Christopher Herbert is an American politician who is a Democratic member for the Hillsborough 24th district of the New Hampshire House of Representatives.
