= Tom Loughman =

American politician

Member of New Hampshire House of Representatives for Rockingham 21
- In office December 5, 2018 – December 7, 2022

Personal details
- Party: Democratic

Tom Loughman is an American politician. He was a member of the New Hampshire House of Representatives and represented the Rockingham 21st district.
