= Howard Moffett =

American politician

Member of the New Hampshire House of Representatives
- In office December 5, 2012 – December 1, 2020
- Constituency: Merrimack 9

Personal details
- Party: Democratic

Howard Moffett is an American politician from New Hampshire. He served in the New Hampshire House of Representatives.

Moffett endorsed the Joe Biden 2020 presidential campaign.
