= Stephanie Hyland =

American politician

Member of the New Hampshire House of Representatives
- In office December 2, 2020 – January 24, 2022
- Constituency: Hillsborough District 38

Personal details
- Born: Lewisburg, West Virginia
- Party: Democratic
- Education: University of West Virginia
- Website: www.stephaniehyland.com

Stephanie Hyland is an American politician from New Hampshire. She served in the New Hampshire House of Representatives.

She resigned from office on January 24, 2022.
