= Betsy McKinney =

American politician (born 1939)

Member of the New Hampshire House of Representatives from the Rockingham 5 district
- Incumbent
- Assumed office 1984

Personal details
- Born: March 24, 1939 (age 87) Bangor, Maine, U.S.
- Party: Republican
- Education: Bentley College
- Occupation: accountant

Betsy McKinney (born March 24, 1939) is an American politician in the state of New Hampshire. She is a member of the New Hampshire House of Representatives, sitting as a Republican from the Rockingham 5 district, having been first elected in 1984.
