= Connie Van Houten =

American politician

Member of the New Hampshire House of Representatives
- In office 2016 – December 7, 2022
- Constituency: Hillsborough 45

Personal details
- Party: Democratic

Constance "Connie" Van Houten is an American politician from New Hampshire. She served in the New Hampshire House of Representatives.

Van Houten endorsed the Elizabeth Warren 2020 presidential campaign.
