= Mel Myler =

American politician

Member of the New Hampshire House of Representatives from the Merrimack 10th district
- In office 2012 – December 7, 2022

Member of the New Hampshire House of Representatives from the Merrimack 9th district
- Incumbent
- Assumed office December 7, 2022

Personal details
- Party: Democratic

Mel Myler is an American politician. He serves as a Democratic member for the Merrimack 9th district of the New Hampshire House of Representatives.
