= Hershel Nunez =

American politician

Member of New Hampshire House of Representatives for Hillsborough 37
- In office December 5, 2018 – August 30, 2022

Personal details
- Party: Republican

Hershel Nunez is an American politician. He was a member of the New Hampshire House of Representatives and represented Hillsborough's 37th district.
