= Mary Heath (politician) =

American politician

Mary Sullivan Heath
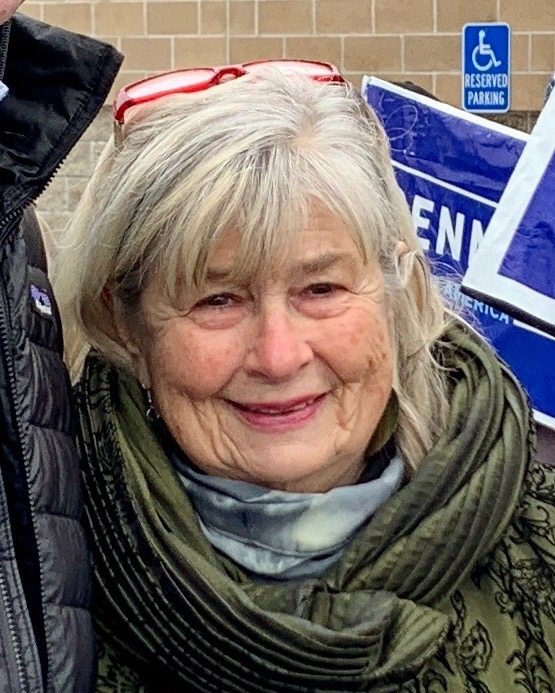
- Mary Heath in 2020
- Occupations: Educator, Politician
- Office: Former member of the New Hampshire House of Representatives
- Successor: Lily M. Foss, Tim Harnett, Karen Hegner
- Political party: Democratic Party

Mary Sullivan Heath is an American educator and politician. She served as a member of the New Hampshire House of Representatives, representing Hillsborough 41, from 2013 to 2024. She is a Democrat and served as the House's Majority Floor Leader. She is the former dean of the School of Education at Southern New Hampshire University.

== Early life and career ==
In 2009, she became dean of the School of Education at Southern New Hampshire University.

== Politics ==
She served as a member of the New Hampshire House of Representatives, representing Hillsborough 41, from 2013 to 2024. She is a Democrat and served as the House's Majority Floor Leader.

In 2019, she was awarded the New Hampshire Democrat's Flag Day Award for her "incredible impact" on the Democratic Party.

She endorsed Michael Bennet during his 2020 presidential campaign.
