= David Karrick =

American politician

Member of New Hampshire House of Representatives for Merrimack 25
- In office December 5, 2018 – December 2, 2020
- Succeeded by: Natalie Wells
- In office 2012–2016

Personal details
- Party: Democratic

David Karrick is an American politician. He was a member of the New Hampshire House of Representatives and represented Merrimack's 25th district.
