= Becky Owens =

American politician

Member of the New Hampshire House of Representatives
- In office December 5, 2018 – December 1, 2020
- Succeeded by: Oliver Ford
- Constituency: Rockingham 4

Personal details
- Party: Republican

Becky Owens is an American politician from New Hampshire. She served in the New Hampshire House of Representatives.
