= Beth Rodd =

American politician

Member of the New Hampshire House of Representatives from the Merrimack 6 district
- In office 2016 – December 2, 2020
- Succeeded by: Tony Caplan

Personal details
- Party: Democratic
- Education: Hunter College School of Social Work

Beth Rodd is a New Hampshire politician.

== Education ==
Rodd earned an MA from the Hunter College School of Social Work.

== Career ==
On November 8, 2016, Rodd was elected to the New Hampshire House of Representatives where she represents the Merrimack 6 district. She assumed office later in 2016. She is a Democrat.

== Personal life ==
Rodd resides in Bradford, New Hampshire. She is married and has two children.
