= Abigail Rooney =

American politician

Member of the New Hampshire House of Representatives
- In office December 5, 2018 – September 8, 2020
- Constituency: Strafford 1

Personal details
- Party: Republican

Abigail Rooney is an American politician from New Hampshire. She served in the New Hampshire House of Representatives.
