= Amanda Gourgue =

American politician

Member of the New Hampshire House of Representatives from the Strafford 25th district
- In office December 2016 – December 2022
- Preceded by: Joe Hannon

Personal details
- Party: Democratic
- Education: Antioch University New England (MBA); Vermont Law School

Amanda Gourgue is a New Hampshire politician. She served in the New Hampshire House of Representatives from December 2016 to December 2022.

== Education ==
Gourgue earned an MBA in sustainability from Antioch University New England and a masters of environmental law and policy from Vermont Law School.

== Career ==
On November 8, 2016, Gourgue was elected to the New Hampshire House of Representatives where she represented the Strafford 25 district. She assumed office later in 2016. She is a Democrat. She served until December 2022.

== Personal life ==
Gourgue resides in Lee, New Hampshire.
