= Benjamin Baroody =

American politician

Member of the New Hampshire House of Representatives from the Hillsborough 43 district
- Incumbent
- Assumed office December 3, 2014

Personal details
- Party: Democratic
- Education: Manchester Central High School; La Salle Extension University

Benjamin C. Baroody is a New Hampshire politician.

== Education ==
Baroody graduated from Manchester Central High School. Baroody later graduated from La Salle Extension University in 1969.

== Career ==
Baroody served in the New Hampshire House of Representatives from 1992 to 2012. On November 4, 2014, Baroody was elected to the New Hampshire House of Representatives where he represents the Hillsborough 43 district. Baroody assumed office on December 3, 2014. Baroody is a Democrat.

== Personal life ==
Baroody resides in Manchester, New Hampshire. Baroody is divorced and has two children.
