= William Foster (New Hampshire politician) =

American politician

Member of the New Hampshire House of Representatives from the Hillsborough 5th district
- In office December 2, 2020 – December 7, 2022

Personal details
- Party: Republican

William Foster is an American politician who served as a Republican member for the Hillsborough 5th district of the New Hampshire House of Representatives.
