= Paul Dargie =

American politician

Member of New Hampshire House of Representatives for Hillsborough County's 43rd district
- Incumbent
- Assumed office December 4, 2024

Personal details
- Party: Democratic

Paul Dargie is an American politician. He is a member of the New Hampshire House of Representatives.

Dargie served on the Milford School Board for 15 years including as chairman.
