= Polly Campion =

American politician

Member of the New Hampshire House of Representatives
- In office 2016 – December 2, 2020
- Constituency: Grafton 12

Personal details
- Party: Democratic

Polly Kent Campion is an American politician from New Hampshire. She served in the New Hampshire House of Representatives.

She holds a degree in advanced nursing. She is a nurse by profession.
