= Kathryn Stack =

American politician

Member of New Hampshire House of Representatives for Rockingham 21
- In office December 5, 2018 – December 2, 2020

Personal details
- Party: Democratic

Kathryn Stack is an American politician. She was a member of the New Hampshire House of Representatives.

In 2020, she endorsed the Elizabeth Warren 2020 presidential campaign.
