= Bruce Cohen (politician) =

American politician

Member of New Hampshire House of Representatives for Hillsborough 28
- In office December 5, 2018 – December 7, 2022

Personal details
- Party: Democratic

Bruce Cohen is an American politician. He was a member of the New Hampshire House of Representatives and represented Hillsborough 28th district.
