= Patrick Abrami =

American politician

Member of the New Hampshire House of Representatives from the Rockingham 13th district
- In office 2010–2012

Member of the New Hampshire House of Representatives from the Rockingham 19th district
- In office 2012 – December 7, 2022

Personal details
- Party: Republican

Patrick Abrami is an American politician. He served as a Republican member for the Rockingham 13th and 19th district of the New Hampshire House of Representatives.
