= Wayne Moynihan =

American politician

Member of the New Hampshire House of Representatives from the 2nd Coos district
- In office December 5, 2012 – December 2, 2020
- Preceded by: William J. Remick; Herbert D. Richardson; John E. Tholl; Evalyn Merrick
- Succeeded by: Arnold Davis
- In office December 4, 1996 – December 2, 1998
- Preceded by: Josephine Mayhew
- Succeeded by: Dana Landers

Personal details
- Born: Wayne Thomas Moynihan; October 13, 1947 (age 78) Belmont, New Hampshire
- Party: Democratic
- Spouse: Claudette
- Education: University of New Hampshire; Central Michigan University; University of New Hampshire School of Law

Military service
- Allegiance: United States
- Branch/service: United States Air Force
- Battles/wars: Vietnam War

Wayne Thomas Moynihan (born October 13, 1947) is a New Hampshire politician.

== Early life ==
Moynihan was born and raised in Belmont, New Hampshire.

== Education ==
Moynihan earned a B.A. from the University of New Hampshire in 1970, a master's degree from Central Michigan University in 1975, and a J.D. from the University of New Hampshire School of Law in 1985.

== Military career ==
Moynihan has served in the United States Air Force in the Vietnam War.

== Professional career ==
Moynihan practiced law from 1985 to 2016. Moynihan served in the New Hampshire House of Representatives from 1996 to 1998. On November 6, 2012, Moynihan was elected to the New Hampshire House of Representatives where he represents the Coos 2 district. Moynihan assumed office on December 5, 2012. Moynihan is a Democrat. Moynihan endorses Bernie Sanders in the 2020 Democratic Party presidential primaries.

== Personal life ==
Moynihan resides in Dummer, New Hampshire.
