= Yvonne Thomas (politician) =

American politician

Member of the New Hampshire House of Representatives
- In office 2006 – December 2, 2020
- Constituency: Coos 3

Personal details
- Party: Democratic

Yvonne D. Thomas is an American politician from New Hampshire. She served in the New Hampshire House of Representatives.
