= Bill Nelson (New Hampshire politician) =

American politician

Member of New Hampshire House of Representatives for Carroll 5
- In office December 5, 2012 – December 7, 2022

Personal details
- Party: Republican

Bill Nelson is an American politician. He was a member of the New Hampshire House of Representatives.
