= Michael Costable =

American politician

Member of the New Hampshire House of Representatives from the Rockingham 3rd district
- In office December 7, 2016 – December 2, 2020

Member of the New Hampshire House of Representatives from the Carroll 8th district
- Incumbent
- Assumed office December 7, 2022

Personal details
- Party: Republican

Michael Costable is an American politician. He serves as a Republican member for the Carroll 8th district of the New Hampshire House of Representatives.
