= Joelle Martin =

American politician

Member of New Hampshire House of Representatives for Hillsborough 23
- In office 2016 – December 2, 2020

Personal details
- Party: Democratic

Joelle Martin is an American politician. She was a member of the New Hampshire House of Representatives. In 2019, she was awarded the Legislator of the Year award by New Futures. She endorsed the Pete Buttigieg presidential campaign in the 2020 Democratic Party presidential primaries
