= Iz Piedra =

American politician

Member of the New Hampshire House of Representatives from the Hillsborough 9th district
- In office December 5, 2018 – December 7, 2022
- Preceded by: William O’Neill
- Succeeded by: David Preece (redistricted)

Personal details
- Born: July 24, 1990 (age 36) Nashua, New Hampshire
- Party: Democratic
- Education: Bates College; Boston College Law School
- Profession: Attorney
- Website: Website

Israel "Iz" Piedra is an attorney and former New Hampshire state representative. He represented Manchester in the New Hampshire House of Representatives from 2018 until 2022. He is a graduate of Milford High School, Bates College, and Boston College Law School.
