= Erika Connors =

American politician

Member of the New Hampshire House of Representatives
- In office 2017 – December 7, 2022
- Constituency: Hillsborough 15

Personal details
- Party: Democratic

Erika Connors is an American politician from New Hampshire. She served in the New Hampshire House of Representatives.
