= John Burt (New Hampshire politician) =

American politician

Member of New Hampshire House of Representatives for Hillsborough 39
- In office 2014 – December 7, 2022

Member of New Hampshire House of Representatives for Hillsborough 6
- In office 2010–2014

Personal details
- Party: Republican

John A. Burt is an American politician. He was a member of the New Hampshire House of Representatives.
