= Dianne Schuett =

American politician

Member of the New Hampshire House of Representatives from the Merrimack 7th district
- In office 2008–2010

Member of the New Hampshire House of Representatives from the Merrimack 20th district
- In office 2012 – December 7, 2022

Member of the New Hampshire House of Representatives from the Merrimack 12th district
- Incumbent
- Assumed office December 7, 2022

Personal details
- Party: Democratic

Dianne Schuett is an American politician. She serves as a Democratic member for the Merrimack 12th district of the New Hampshire House of Representatives.
