= Franklin T. Tilton =

American politician

Member of the New Hampshire House of Representatives from the Belknap 3 district
- In office 2010–2020

Personal details
- Born: May 4, 1939
- Died: October 20, 2023 (aged 84)
- Party: Republican

Franklin T. Tilton (May 4, 1939 – October 20, 2023) was an American politician. He served as a Republican member of the New Hampshire House of Representatives.

Tilton died on October 20, 2023, at the age of 84.
