= Dennis Acton =

American politician

Member of the New Hampshire House of Representatives
- In office December 5, 2018 – December 7, 2022
- Constituency: Rockingham 10

Personal details
- Party: Republican
- Education: Southern Connecticut State University

Dennis Acton is an American politician from New Hampshire. He served in the New Hampshire House of Representatives.
