= Charles McMahon (politician) =

American politician

Member of the New Hampshire House of Representatives from the Rockingham 76th district
- In office 2002–2004

Member of the New Hampshire House of Representatives from the Rockingham 4th district
- In office 2004–2012

Member of the New Hampshire House of Representatives from the Rockingham 7th district
- In office 2012 – December 7, 2022

Member of the New Hampshire House of Representatives from the Rockingham 17th district
- Incumbent
- Assumed office December 7, 2022

Personal details
- Party: Republican

Charles McMahon is an American politician. He serves as a Republican member for the Rockingham 17th district of the New Hampshire House of Representatives.
