= Mike Edgar =

American politician

Michael Edgar

Member of the New Hampshire House of Representatives from the Rockingham 21st district
- In office 2016 – December 7, 2022

Member of the New Hampshire House of Representatives from the Rockingham 29th district
- Incumbent
- Assumed office December 7, 2022

Personal details
- Party: Democratic

Michael Edgar is an American politician. He serves as a Democratic member for the Rockingham 29th district of the New Hampshire House of Representatives.
