= Ed DeClercq =

American politician (1952–2025)

Member of New Hampshire House of Representatives for Rockingham 8
- In office December 5, 2018 – December 1, 2020

Personal details
- Born: May 18, 1952 Lawrence, Massachusetts
- Died: February 2, 2025 (aged 72) Salem, New Hampshire
- Party: Republican

Edward "Ed" Charles DeClercq (May 18, 1952 – February 2, 2025) was an American politician. He was a member of the New Hampshire House of Representatives and represented Rockingham 8th district.
