= Tony Piemonte =

American politician

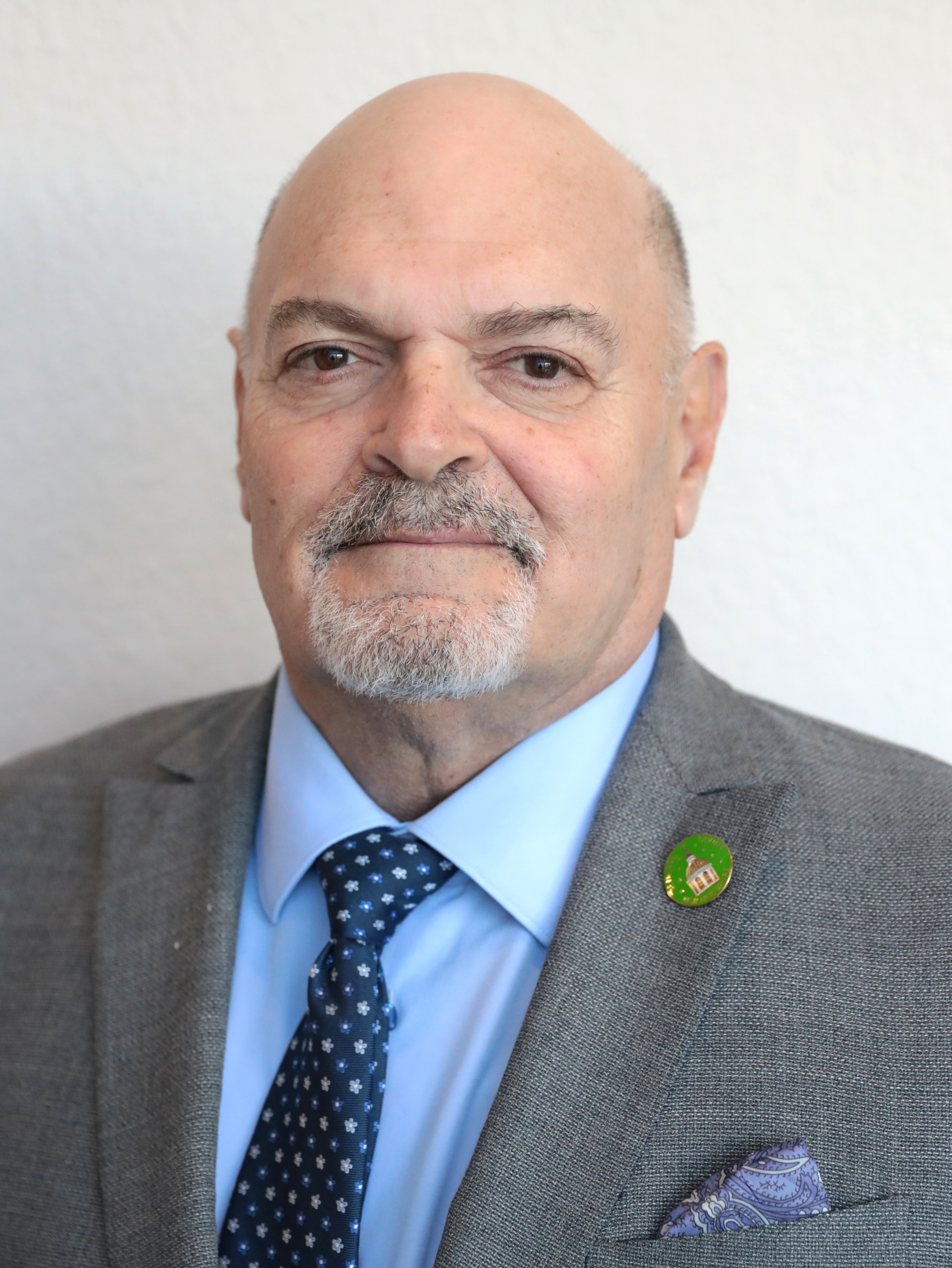

Member of the New Hampshire House of Representatives from the Rockingham 4th district
- In office December 5, 2018 – December 7, 2022

Member of the New Hampshire House of Representatives from the Rockingham 9th district
- Incumbent
- Assumed office December 7, 2022

Personal details
- Party: Republican

Tony Piemonte is an American politician. He serves as a Republican member for the Rockingham 9th district of the New Hampshire House of Representatives.
