= Kurt Wuelper =

American politician

Member of New Hampshire House of Representatives for Strafford 3
- In office December 3, 2014 – December 7, 2022

Personal details
- Party: Republican

Kurt Wuelper is an American politician. He was a member of the New Hampshire House of Representatives.
