= Dan Toomey =

American politician

Member of the New Hampshire House of Representatives from the Hillsborough 32nd district
- In office December 5, 2018 – December 7, 2022

Personal details
- Party: Democratic
- Education: University of Massachusetts Lowell

Military service
- Branch/service: United States Air Force

Daniel E. Toomey is a New Hampshire politician.

== Education ==
Toomey earned a master's degree from the University of Massachusetts Lowell.

== Career ==
=== Military career ===
Toomey served in the United States Air Force.

=== Professional career ===
Toomey previously served as a member of the New Hampshire House of Representatives from 1989 to 1991. On November 6, 2018, Toomey was elected to the New Hampshire House of Representatives where he represents the Hillsborough 32 district. Toomey assumed office on December 5, 2018. Toomey is a Democrat. Toomey endorsed Bernie Sanders in the 2020 Democratic Party presidential primaries.

== Personal life ==
Toomey resides in Nashua, New Hampshire. Toomey is married and has five children, including U.S. Representative Val Hoyle.
