= Michael Cahill (New Hampshire politician) =

American politician

Member of the New Hampshire House of Representatives from the Rockingham 10th district
- Incumbent
- Assumed office December 7, 2022

Member of the New Hampshire House of Representatives from the Rockingham 17th district
- In office December 5, 2012 – December 7, 2022

Personal details
- Party: Democratic

Michael Cahill is an American politician. He serves as a Democratic member for the Rockingham 10th district of the New Hampshire House of Representatives.
