= Dennis Thompson (politician) =

American politician

Member of New Hampshire House of Representatives for Coos 1
- In office December 2, 2020 – December 7, 2022

Personal details
- Party: Republican

Dennis J. Thompson is an American politician. He was a member of the New Hampshire House of Representatives and represented the Coos 1st district.
