= Kat McGhee =

American politician

Member of the New Hampshire House of Representatives from the Hillsborough 40th district
- In office December 5, 2018 – December 2, 2020

Member of the New Hampshire House of Representatives from the Hillsborough 27th district
- In office December 2, 2020 – December 7, 2022

Member of the New Hampshire House of Representatives from the Hillsborough 35th district
- Incumbent
- Assumed office December 7, 2022

Personal details
- Party: Democratic

Kat McGhee is an American politician. She serves as a Democratic member for the Hillsborough 35th district of the New Hampshire House of Representatives.
