= Margaret Kennedy (American politician) =

American politician

Margaret A. Kennedy

New Hampshire House of Representatives
- Incumbent
- Assumed office 2020

Personal details
- Born: Margaret Anne Kennedy
- Party: Republican

Margaret Anne Kennedy is an American politician who is a member of the New Hampshire House of Representatives. She represents Merrimack County District 7 as a Republican.
