= Tony Caplan =

American politician

Member of the New Hampshire House of Representatives from the Merrimack 6th district
- In office 2020 – December 7, 2022

Member of the New Hampshire House of Representatives from the Merrimack 8th district
- Incumbent
- Assumed office December 7, 2022

Personal details
- Born: Caracas, Venezuela
- Party: Democratic

Tony Caplan is an American politician. He serves as a Democratic member for the Merrimack 8th district of the New Hampshire House of Representatives.
