= Diane Kelley =

American politician

Member of the New Hampshire House of Representatives from the Hillsborough 25th district
- In office 2020 – December 7, 2022

Member of the New Hampshire House of Representatives from the Hillsborough 32nd district
- Incumbent
- Assumed office December 7, 2022

Personal details
- Party: Republican

Diane Kelley is an American politician. She serves as a Republican member for the Hillsborough 32nd district of the New Hampshire House of Representatives.
