= John B. Hunt =

American politician

Member of the New Hampshire House of Representatives from the Cheshire 14th district
- Incumbent
- Assumed office December 7, 2022
- Preceded by: Matthew John Santonastaso

Member of the New Hampshire House of Representatives from the Cheshire 11th district
- In office December 5, 2012 – December 7, 2022
- Preceded by: District created
- Succeeded by: Zachary Nutting

Member of the New Hampshire House of Representatives from the Cheshire 7th district
- In office December 1, 2004 – December 5, 2012
- Preceded by: District created
- Succeeded by: Gladys Johnsen

Member of the New Hampshire House of Representatives from the Cheshire 28th district
- In office December 4, 2002 – December 1, 2004
- Preceded by: District created
- Succeeded by: District abolished

Member of the New Hampshire House of Representatives from the Cheshire 10th district
- In office December 2, 1992 – December 4, 2002
- Preceded by: Stacey W. Cole; David M. Perry
- Succeeded by: District abolished

Member of the New Hampshire House of Representatives from the Cheshire 9th district
- In office December 3, 1986 – December 2, 1992
- Preceded by: Dale E. Thompson
- Succeeded by: H. Charles Royce; Joseph P. Manning

Personal details
- Born: November 13, 1956 (age 69) Pittsburgh, Pennsylvania, U.S.
- Party: Republican
- Education: Boston University
- Profession: teacher

John B. Hunt (born November 13, 1956) is an American politician in the state of New Hampshire. He is a member of the New Hampshire House of Representatives, sitting as a Republican from the Cheshire 11 district, having been first elected in 1986.

== Controversy ==
In June 2024, Hunt faced criticism following comments he made during a New Hampshire House committee hearing related to immigration and border security. During the hearing, Hunt suggested that people with “olive skin” near the northern border should carry identification, remarks that were widely criticized by fellow lawmakers and members of the public as inappropriate and discriminatory.

After the comments drew backlash, Hunt said he regretted the phrasing, stating that he had misspoken and that his remarks were not intended to target individuals based on race or ethnicity. He defended his broader position as being focused on border security concerns rather than personal characteristics. The incident prompted discussion among legislators about language, bias, and conduct during official proceedings.
