= Dennis Malloy =

American politician

Member of the New Hampshire House of Representatives from the Strafford 4th district
- In office 2012–2014

Member of the New Hampshire House of Representatives from the Rockingham 23rd district
- In office 2016 – December 7, 2022

Member of the New Hampshire House of Representatives from the Rockingham 24th district
- Incumbent
- Assumed office December 7, 2022

Personal details
- Party: Democratic

Dennis Malloy is an American politician. He serves as a Democratic member for the Rockingham 24th district of the New Hampshire House of Representatives.
