= JD Bernardy =

American politician

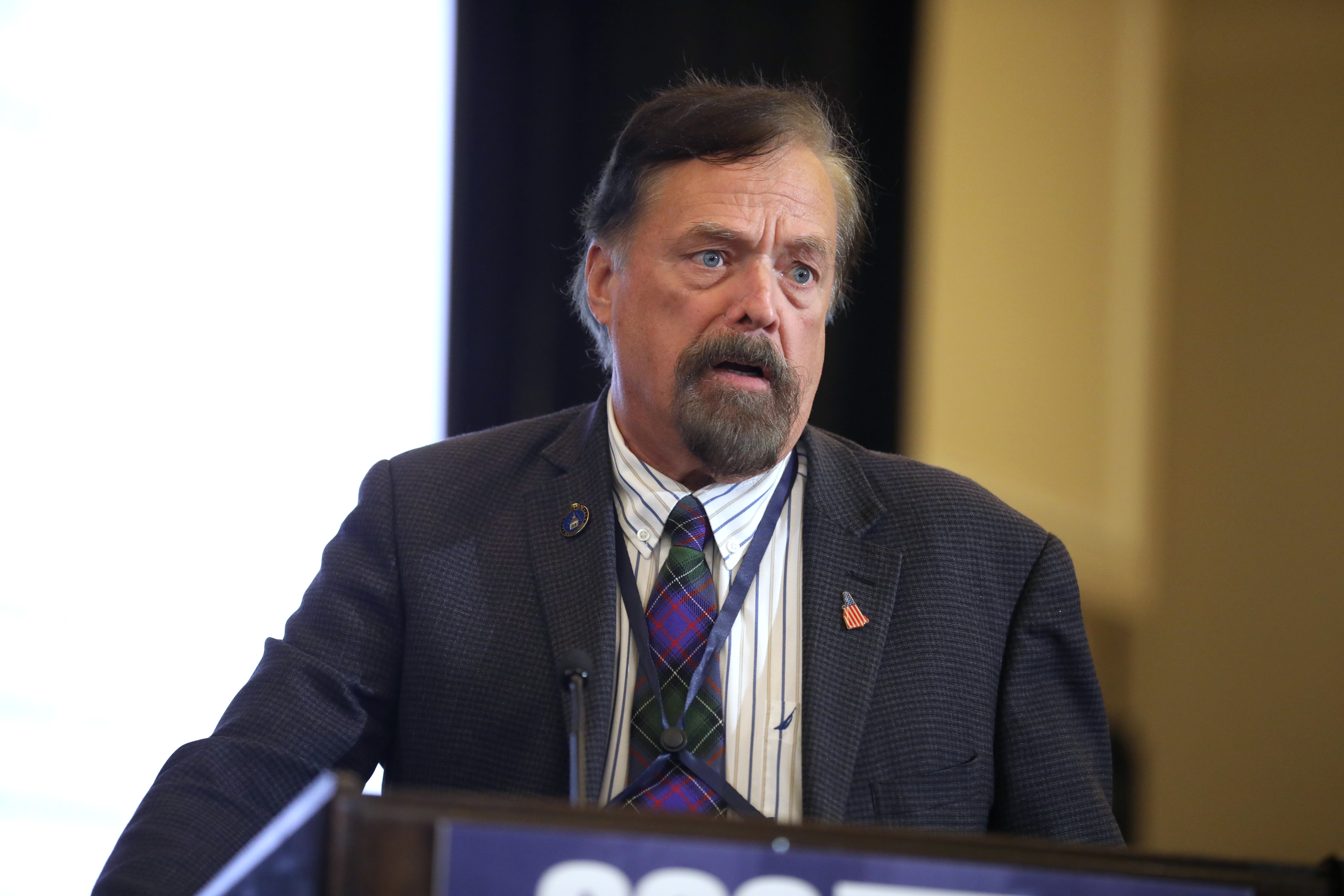

Member of the New Hampshire House of Representatives from the Rockingham 36th district
- Incumbent
- Assumed office December 7, 2022

Member of the New Hampshire House of Representatives from the Rockingham 16th district
- In office December 2, 2020 – December 7, 2022

Personal details
- Party: Republican

JD Bernardy is an American politician. He serves as a Republican member for the Rockingham 36th district of the New Hampshire House of Representatives.
