= Gerry Ward (politician) =

American politician

Member of the New Hampshire House of Representatives from the Rockingham 27th district
- Incumbent
- Assumed office December 7, 2022

Personal details
- Party: Democratic
- Education: Harvard College (BA); University of Boston (PhD)

Gerry Ward is an American politician. He serves as a Democratic member for the Rockingham 27th district of the New Hampshire House of Representatives.
