= Ben Kilanski =

American politician

Member of New Hampshire House of Representatives for Cheshire 13
- In office December 2, 2020 – December 7, 2022

Personal details
- Party: Republican

Ben Kilanski is an American politician. He was a member of the New Hampshire House of Representatives.
