= Gerald Griffin (politician) =

American politician

Member of the New Hampshire House of Representatives from the Hillsborough 42nd district
- Incumbent
- Assumed office December 7, 2022

Member of the New Hampshire House of Representatives from the Hillsborough 5th district
- In office December 2, 2020 – December 7, 2022
- In office December 7, 2016 – December 5, 2018

Personal details
- Party: Republican

Gerald Griffin is an American politician. He serves as a Republican member for the Hillsborough 42nd district of the New Hampshire House of Representatives.

== Early life ==
Griffin served in the United States Air Force and retired as a captain. He served during the Vietnam War and received a Bronze Star Medal.

== Career ==
Griffin is an owner of a license plate museum in New Hampshire.
