= Donald Dostie =

New Hampshire Republican

Member of the New Hampshire House of Representatives from the Coos 1st district
- In office December 2, 2020 – October 27, 2021

Personal details
- Party: Republican

Donald Dostie is an American politician in the state of New Hampshire. He is a former member of the New Hampshire House of Representatives, having sat as a Republican from the Coos 1 district from 2020 to 2021. Dostie was assigned to the Fish and Game and Marine Resources Committee for the 2020–2022 term. Dostie resigned October 27, 2021.
