= Dave Testerman =

American politician

Member of the New Hampshire House of Representatives from the Merrimack 3rd district
- In office December 7, 2022 – December 4, 2024

Member of the New Hampshire House of Representatives from the Merrimack 2nd district
- In office December 7, 2016 – December 7, 2022

Personal details
- Party: Republican

Dave Testerman was an American politician. He served as a Republican member for the Merrimack 3rd district of the New Hampshire House of Representatives.
