= Tom Lanzara =

American politician

Member of the New Hampshire House of Representatives from the Hillsborough 28th district
- In office December 2, 2020 – December 7, 2022

Personal details
- Born: Nashua, New Hampshire, U.S.
- Party: Republican
- Education: University of New Haven

Tom Lanzara is an American politician. A member of the Republican Party, he served in the New Hampshire House of Representatives from 2020 to 2022.

== Life and career ==
Lanzara was born in Nashua, New Hampshire. He attended and graduated from Bishop Guertin High School. After graduating, he attended the University of New Haven, earning his bachelor's degree in arson investigation and fire administration, which after earning his degree, he worked as a firefighter.

Lanzara served in the New Hampshire House of Representatives from 2020 to 2022.
