= Walter Spilsbury =

American politician

Member of the New Hampshire House of Representatives from the Sullivan 3rd district
- Incumbent
- Assumed office December 7, 2022

Member of the New Hampshire House of Representatives from the Sullivan 8th district
- In office December 2, 2020 – December 7, 2022

Personal details
- Party: Republican

Walter Spilsbury is an American politician. He serves as a Republican member for the Sullivan 3rd district of the New Hampshire House of Representatives.
