= Jim Qualey =

American politician

Jim Qualey is an American state representative in Cheshire County, New Hampshire, for the Republican Party.

== Political career ==
He was elected to the New Hampshire House of Representatives in 2020 with 27% of the vote, with the campaign slogan "Live Free or Die". His seat represents Fitzwilliam and Rindge.

He sits on the Election Law Committee and has supported articles calling for more parental approval of educational material in local schools; in his area, such proposals were dismissed. He expressed an interest in bringing it back, and criticized the school district for not acknowledging it anyway.

== Personal life ==
Qualey received his BA from Worcester Polytechnic Institute and a Master’s and PhD from Pennsylvania State University.
