= Matthew Santonastaso =

American politician

Member of the New Hampshire House of Representatives from the Cheshire 14th district
- In office 2020 – December 7, 2022

Member of the New Hampshire House of Representatives from the Cheshire 18th district
- Incumbent
- Assumed office December 7, 2022

Personal details
- Party: Republican

Matthew Santonastaso is an American politician who served as a Republican member for the Cheshire 18th district of the New Hampshire House of Representatives.

In 2022, Santonastaso cosponsored, and expressed support for, state legislation supporting the secession of New Hampshire from the United States.
