= 2018 New Hampshire House of Representatives election =

New Hampshire House of Representatives election, 2018
- November 6, 2018

All 400 seats in the New Hampshire House of Representatives 201 seats needed for a majority
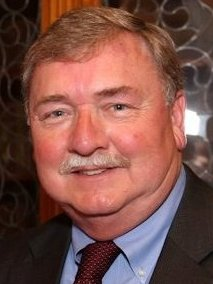

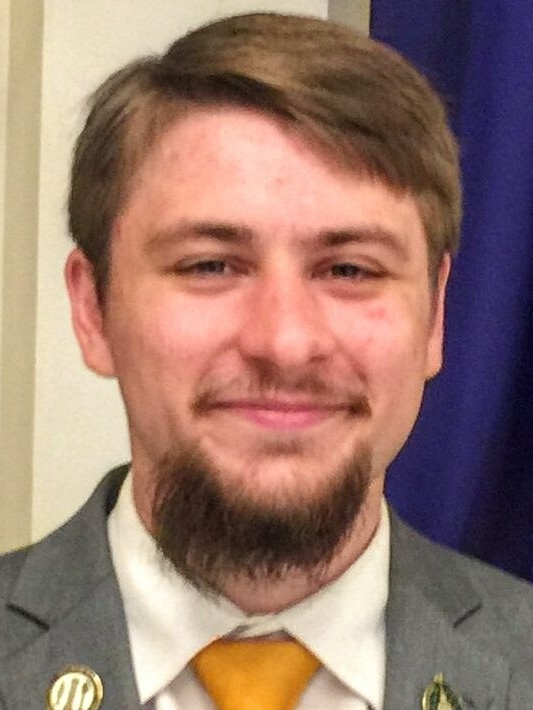
	Majority party	Minority party	Third party
		GOP
Leader	Steve Shurtleff	Gene G. Chandler (lost re-election)	Caleb Q. Dyer (lost re-election)
Party	Democratic	Republican	Libertarian
Leader's seat	Merrimack 11	Carroll 1	Hillsborough 37
Last election	173	227	0
Seats before	167	212	2 (Note: One Libertarian Representative who switched from the Democrats resigned prior to the elections.)
Seats won	234	166	0
Seat change	▲61	▼61	▼2
Popular vote	1,094,719	980,303	9,218
Percentage	52.47%	46.99%	0.44%
- Results: Democratic gain Republican gain Democratic hold Republican hold
Speaker before election
Gene G. Chandler
Republican
Elected Speaker
Steve Shurtleff
Democratic

The 2018 New Hampshire House of Representatives elections took place as part of the biennial United States elections. New Hampshire voters elected all 400 state representatives from 103 districts. State representatives serve two-year terms in the New Hampshire House of Representatives. A primary election on September 11, 2018, determined which candidates would appear on the November 6 general election ballot. All the members elected served in the 166th New Hampshire General Court.

== Results ==
District		Incumbent	Party	Elected Representative	Party
Belknap	1	Valerie Fraser	Rep	Harry Viens	Rep
Belknap	2	Marc Abear	Rep	Harry Bean	Rep
Belknap	2	Glen Aldrich	Rep	Glen Aldrich	Rep
Belknap	2	Norm Silber	Rep	Deanna Jurius	Rep
Belknap	2	Herb Vadney	Rep	Jonathan Mackie	Rep
Belknap	3	David Huot	Dem	David Huot	Dem
Belknap	3	Peter Spanos	Rep	Peter Spanos	Rep
Belknap	3	Franklin Tilton	Rep	Franklin Tilton	Rep
Belknap	3	Philip Spagnuolo Jr.	Dem	Richard Beaudoin	Rep
Belknap	4	Dennis Fields	Rep	Dennis Fields	Rep
Belknap	4	Timothy Lang Sr.	Rep	Timothy Lang Sr.	Rep
Belknap	5	Vacant (Note: Republican Michael F. Maloney resigned October 13, 2017.)		George Feeney	Rep
Belknap	5	Peter Varney	Rep	Peter Varney	Rep
Belknap	6	John Plumer	Rep	John Plumer	Rep
Belknap	6	Michael Sylvia	Rep	Michael Sylvia	Rep
Belknap	7	Barbara Comtois	Rep	Barbara Comtois	Rep
Belknap	8	Raymond Howard	Rep	Raymond Howard	Rep
Belknap	9	Charlie St. Clair	Dem	Charlie St. Clair	Dem
Carroll	1	Gene G. Chandler	Rep	Anita Burroughs	Dem
Carroll	2	Thomas Buco	Dem	Thomas Buco	Dem
Carroll	2	Frank McCarthy	Rep	Harrison Kanzler	Dem
Carroll	2	Karen Umberger	Rep	Stephen Woodcock	Dem
Carroll	3	Jerry Knirk	Dem	Jerry Knirk	Dem
Carroll	3	Mark McConkey	Rep	Susan Ticehurst	Dem
Carroll	4	Glenn Cordelli	Rep	Glenn Cordelli	Rep
Carroll	4	Karel Crawford	Rep	Karel Crawford	Rep
Carroll	5	Lino Avellani	Rep	Lino Avellani	Rep
Carroll	5	Ed Comeau	Rep	Ed Comeau	Rep
Carroll	5	Bill Nelson	Rep	Bill Nelson	Rep
Carroll	6	Edith DesMarais	Dem	Edith DesMarais	Dem
Carroll	6	Steve Schmidt	Rep	John MacDonald	Rep
Carroll	7	Ed Butler	Dem	Ed Butler	Dem
Carroll	8	William Marsh	Rep	William Marsh	Rep
Cheshire	1	Michael Abbott	Dem	Michael Abbott	Dem
Cheshire	1	Paul Berch	Dem	Paul Berch	Dem
Cheshire	1	Cathryn Harvey	Dem	Cathryn Harvey	Dem
Cheshire	1	Lucy Weber	Dem	Lucy Weber	Dem
Cheshire	2	John Mann	Dem	John Mann	Dem
Cheshire	3	Dan Eaton	Dem	Dan Eaton	Dem
Cheshire	4	Vacant (Note: Libertarian Joseph Stallcop (elected in 2016 as a Democrat but switched to Libertarian in May 2017) resigned in August 2018.)		David Morrill	Dem
Cheshire	5	John Bordenet	Dem	John Bordenet	Dem
Cheshire	6	David Meader	Dem	David Meader	Dem
Cheshire	7	Gladys Johnsen	Dem	Sparky Von Plinsky	Dem
Cheshire	8	Donovan Fenton	Dem	Donovan Fenton	Dem
Cheshire	9	Richard Ames	Dem	Richard Ames	Dem
Cheshire	9	Douglas Ley	Dem	Douglas Ley	Dem
Cheshire	10	Marge Shepardson	Dem	Sandy Swinburne	Dem
Cheshire	11	John B. Hunt	Rep	John B. Hunt	Rep
Cheshire	11	John O'Day	Rep	John O'Day	Rep
Cheshire	12	F. Barrett Faulkner	Dem	F. Barrett Faulkner	Dem
Cheshire	12	Jim McConnell	Rep	Jennie Gomarlo	Dem
Cheshire	13	Henry Parkhurst	Dem	Henry Parkhurst	Dem
Cheshire	14	Frank Sterling Jr.	Rep	Craig Thompson	Dem
Cheshire	15	Bruce Tatro	Dem	Bruce Tatro	Dem
Cheshire	16	Delmar Burridge	Dem	Joe Schapiro	Dem
Cheshire	16	William Pearson	Dem	William Pearson	Dem
Coös	1	Jon Fothergill	Rep	Jon Fothergill	Rep
Coös	1	Bing Judd	Rep	Michael Furbush	Rep
Coös	2	Wayne Moynihan	Dem	Wayne Moynihan	Dem
Coös	3	Larry Laflamme	Dem	Larry Laflamme	Dem
Coös	3	Robert Theberge	Rep	Henry Noel	Dem
Coös	3	Yvonne Thomas	Dem	Yvonne Thomas	Dem
Coös	4	Herbert Richardson	Dem	Kevin Craig	Rep
Coös	5	Edith Tucker	Dem	Edith Tucker	Dem
Coös	6	William Hatch	Dem	William Hatch	Dem
Coös	7	Troy Merner	Rep	Troy Merner	Rep
Grafton	1	Erin Tapper Hennessey	Rep	Erin Tapper Hennessey	Rep
Grafton	1	Linda Massimilla	Dem	Linda Massimilla	Dem
Grafton	2	Skylar Boutin	Rep	Timothy Egan	Dem
Grafton	3	Susan M. Ford	Dem	Susan M. Ford	Dem
Grafton	4	Rick Ladd	Rep	Rick Ladd	Rep
Grafton	5	Bonnie Ham	Rep	Jerry Stringham	Dem
Grafton	6	Kevin Maes	Dem	Kevin Maes	Dem
Grafton	7	Tiffany Johnson	Rep	Richard Osborne	Dem
Grafton	8	Travis Bennett	Dem	Sallie Fellows	Dem
Grafton	8	Steven Rand	Dem	Joyce Weston	Dem
Grafton	8	Suzanne Smith	Dem	Suzanne Smith	Dem
Grafton	9	Robert Hull	Rep	Ned Gordon	Rep
Grafton	9	Vincent Migliore	Rep	Vincent Migliore	Rep
Grafton	10	Roger Dontonville	Dem	Roger Dontonville	Dem
Grafton	11	Timothy Josephson	Dem	Timothy Josephson	Dem
Grafton	12	Polly Campion	Dem	Polly Campion	Dem
Grafton	12	Patricia Higgins	Dem	Garrett Muscatel	Dem
Grafton	12	Mary Jane Mulligan	Dem	Mary Jane Mulligan	Dem
Grafton	12	Sharon Nordgren	Dem	Sharon Nordgren	Dem
Grafton	13	Richard Abel	Dem	Richard Abel	Dem
Grafton	13	Susan Almy	Dem	Susan Almy	Dem
Grafton	13	George Sykes	Dem	George Sykes	Dem
Grafton	13	Andy White	Dem	Laurel Stavis	Dem
Grafton	14	Brad Bailey	Rep	Elaine French	Dem
Grafton	15	David Binford	Rep	Dennis Ruprecht	Dem
Grafton	16	Duane Brown	Rep	Francesca Diggs	Dem
Grafton	17	Stephen Darrow	Rep	Joshua Adjutant	Dem
Hillsborough	1	Jim Fedolfi	Rep	Jim Fedolfi	Rep
Hillsborough	1	Marjorie Porter	Dem	Marjorie Porter	Dem
Hillsborough	2	Daniel Donovan	Rep	Keith Erf	Rep
Hillsborough	2	Gary Hopper	Rep	Gary Hopper	Rep
Hillsborough	2	Neal Kurk	Rep	J.P. Marzullo	Rep
Hillsborough	3	Jonathan Manley	Dem	Dan Pickering	Dem
Hillsborough	4	Vacant (Note: Democrat Carol Roberts resigned June 5, 2018)		Jennifer Bernet	Dem
Hillsborough	4	Kermit Williams	Dem	Kermit Williams	Dem
Hillsborough	5	Glen Dickey	Rep	David Woodbury	Dem
Hillsborough	5	Gerald Griffin	Rep	Donna Mombourquette	Dem
Hillsborough	6	Rick Christie	Rep	Joe Alexander	Rep
Hillsborough	6	Barbara Griffin	Rep	Barbara Griffin	Rep
Hillsborough	6	Dave Pierce	Rep	Michael Gunski	Rep
Hillsborough	6	Claire Rouillard	Rep	Fred Plett	Rep
Hillsborough	6	Nick Zaricki	Rep	Cole Riel	Dem
Hillsborough	7	David Danielson	Rep	David Danielson	Rep
Hillsborough	7	Bart Fromuth	Rep	Linda Camarota	Rep
Hillsborough	7	Linda Gould	Rep	Linda Gould	Rep
Hillsborough	7	John Graham	Rep	John Graham	Rep
Hillsborough	7	Keith Murphy	Rep	Sue Mullen	Dem
Hillsborough	7	Terry Wolf	Rep	Michael Trento	Rep
Hillsborough	8	Jeff Goley	Dem	Jeff Goley	Dem
Hillsborough	8	Daniel Sullivan	Dem	Diane Langley	Dem
Hillsborough	9	Linda DiSilvestro	Dem	Linda DiSilvestro	Dem
Hillsborough	9	Vacant (Note: Democrat Bill O'Neil resigned June 1, 2018)		Iz Piedra	Dem
Hillsborough	10	Jean Jeudy	Dem	Jean Jeudy	Dem
Hillsborough	10	Pat Long	Dem	Pat Long	Dem
Hillsborough	11	Elizabeth Edwards	Dem	Donald Bouchard	Dem
Hillsborough	11	Vacant (Note: Democrat Robert Walsh died July 31, 2018)		Nicole Klein-Knight	Dem
Hillsborough	12	Amanda Bouldin	Dem	Amanda Bouldin	Dem
Hillsborough	12	Lisa Freeman	Rep	Andrew Bouldin	Dem
Hillsborough	13	Larry Gagne	Rep	Larry Gagne	Rep
Hillsborough	13	Richard O'Leary	Dem	Kathy Desjardin	Dem
Hillsborough	14	Mary Freitas	Dem	Mary Freitas	Dem
Hillsborough	14	Mary Heath	Dem	Mary Heath	Dem
Hillsborough	15	Erika Conners	Dem	Erika Conners	Dem
Hillsborough	15	Vacant (Note: Democrat Thomas Katsiantonis resigned January 3, 2018)		Mark Warden	Rep
Hillsborough	16	Barbara Shaw	Dem	Barbara Shaw	Dem
Hillsborough	16	Victoria Sullivan	Rep	Joshua Query	Dem
Hillsborough	17	Mark MacKenzie	Dem	Heidi Hamer	Dem
Hillsborough	17	Timothy Smith	Dem	Timothy Smith	Dem
Hillsborough	18	Patricia Cornell	Dem	Patricia Cornell	Dem
Hillsborough	18	Armand Forest	Dem	Willis Griffith	Dem
Hillsborough	19	Bob Backus	Dem	Bob Backus	Dem
Hillsborough	19	Joel Elber	Dem	Kendall Snow	Dem
Hillsborough	20	Frank Byron	Rep	Ralph Boehm	Rep
Hillsborough	20	Richard Lascelles	Rep	Richard Lascelles	Rep
Hillsborough	21	Dick Barry	Rep	Dick Barry	Rep
Hillsborough	21	Chris Christensen	Rep	Nancy Murphy	Dem
Hillsborough	21	Dick Hinch	Rep	Dick Hinch	Rep
Hillsborough	21	Vacant (Note: Republican Dan Hynes resigned June 1, 2018.)		Rosemarie Rung	Dem
Hillsborough	21	Bob L'Heureux	Rep	Bob L'Heureux	Rep
Hillsborough	21	Josh Moore	Rep	Kathryn Stack	Dem
Hillsborough	21	Jeanine Notter	Rep	Jeanine Notter	Rep
Hillsborough	21	Tony Pellegrino	Rep	Wendy Thomas	Dem
Hillsborough	22	Peter Hansen	Rep	Megan Murray	Dem
Hillsborough	22	Shannon Chandley	Dem	Julie Radhakrishnan	Dem
Hillsborough	22	Reed Panasiti	Rep	Reed Panasiti	Rep
Hillsborough	23	Barbara Biggie	Rep	Paul Dargie	Dem
Hillsborough	23	Charlie Burns	Rep	Charlie Burns	Rep
Hillsborough	23	Carolyn Halstead	Rep	Peter Petrigno	Dem
Hillsborough	23	Joelle Martin	Dem	Joelle Martin	Dem
Hillsborough	24	Peter Leishman	Dem	Peter Leishman	Dem
Hillsborough	24	Ivy Vann	Dem	Ivy Vann	Dem
Hillsborough	25	Craig Moore	Rep	Tim Merlino	Rep
Hillsborough	25	Paul Somero	Rep	Paul Somero	Rep
Hillsborough	26	John Carr	Rep	Jack Flanagan	Rep
Hillsborough	26	John Lewicke	Rep	Brett Hall	Dem
Hillsborough	27	Jim Belanger	Rep	Jim Belanger	Rep
Hillsborough	27	Carolyn Gargasz	Rep	Michelle St. John	Dem
Hillsborough	28	Jan Schmidt	Dem	Jan Schmidt	Dem
Hillsborough	28	Elizabeth Ferreira	Rep	William Bordy	Dem
Hillsborough	28	Carl Seidel	Rep	Bruce Cohen	Dem
Hillsborough	29	Suzanne Harvey	Dem	Paul Bergeron	Dem
Hillsborough	29	Peggy McCarthy	Rep	Ray Newman	Dem
Hillsborough	29	Sue Newman	Dem	Sue Newman	Dem
Hillsborough	30	Patricia Klee	Dem	Patricia Klee	Dem
Hillsborough	30	Mariellen MacKay	Rep	Sherry Dutzy	Dem
Hillsborough	30	Cindy Rosenwald	Dem	Suzanne Vail	Dem
Hillsborough	31	Vacant (Note: Democrat Jessica Ayala resigned prior to the election.)		Manny Espitia	Dem
Hillsborough	31	David Cote	Dem	David Cote	Dem
Hillsborough	31	Amelia Keane	Dem	Fred Davis	Dem
Hillsborough	32	Don LeBrun	Rep	Allison Nutting-Wong	Dem
Hillsborough	32	David Murotake	Rep	Michael Pedersen	Dem
Hillsborough	32	Steve Negron	Rep	Dan Toomey	Dem
Hillsborough	33	Ken N. Gidge	Dem	Ken N. Gidge	Dem
Hillsborough	33	Mark King	Dem	Mark King	Dem
Hillsborough	33	Kevin Scully	Rep	Fran Nutter-Upham	Dem
Hillsborough	34	Vacant (Note: Democrat Allison Nutting-Wong resigned May 24, 2018.)		Greg Indruk	Dem
Hillsborough	34	Catherine Sofikitis	Dem	Catherine Sofikitis	Dem
Hillsborough	34	Timothy Twombly	Rep	Deb Stevens	Dem
Hillsborough	35	Skip Cleaver	Dem	Skip Cleaver	Dem
Hillsborough	35	David Lisle	Dem	Laura Telerski	Dem
Hillsborough	35	Latha Mangipudi	Dem	Latha Mangipudi	Dem
Hillsborough	36	Marty Jack	Dem	Marty Jack	Dem
Hillsborough	36	Michael O'Brien	Dem	Michael O'Brien	Dem
Hillsborough	36	Bill Ohm	Rep	Linda Harriott-Gathright	Dem
Hillsborough	37	Caleb Q. Dyer	Lib	Bob Greene	Rep
Hillsborough	37	Vacant (Note: Republican Steve Hellwig resigned July 24, 2018.)		Alicia Lekas	Rep
Hillsborough	37	Vacant (Note: Republican Shawn Jasper resigned December 1, 2017.)		Tony Lekas	Rep
Hillsborough	37	Lynne Ober	Rep	Lynne Ober	Rep
Hillsborough	37	Russell Ober	Rep	Russell Ober	Rep
Hillsborough	37	Andrew Prout	Rep	Andrew Prout	Rep
Hillsborough	37	Andrew Renzullo	Rep	Andrew Renzullo	Rep
Hillsborough	37	Kimberly Rice	Rep	Kimberly Rice	Rep
Hillsborough	37	Eric Schleien	Rep	Hershel Nunez	Rep
Hillsborough	37	Gregory Smith	Rep	James Whittemore	Rep
Hillsborough	37	Jordan Ulery	Rep	Jordan Ulery	Rep
Hillsborough	38	Richard McNamara	Dem	Chris Balch	Dem
Hillsborough	38	John Valera	Rep	John Bosman	Dem
Hillsborough	39	John Burt	Rep	John Burt	Rep
Hillsborough	40	Keith Ammon	Rep	Kat McGhee	Dem
Hillsborough	41	Laurie Sanborn	Rep	Laurie Sanborn	Rep
Hillsborough	42	Jesse Martineau	Dem	Jacqueline Chretien	Dem
Hillsborough	42	Vacant (Note: Democrat Kendall Snow resigned prior to the election.)		Matthew Wilhelm	Dem
Hillsborough	43	Benjamin Baroody	Dem	Benjamin Baroody	Dem
Hillsborough	43	Christopher Herbert	Dem	Christopher Herbert	Dem
Hillsborough	43	Kathleen Souza	Rep	Richard Komi	Dem
Hillsborough	44	Mark McLean	Rep	Mark McLean	Rep
Hillsborough	44	Mark Proulx	Rep	Mark Proulx	Rep
Hillsborough	45	Jane Beaulieu	Dem	Jane Beaulieu	Dem
Hillsborough	45	Connie Van Houten	Dem	Connie Van Houten	Dem
Merrimack	1	Vacant (Note: Republican Anne Copp resigned June 8, 2018.)		Ken Wells	Dem
Merrimack	2	Werner D. Horn	Rep	Werner D. Horn	Rep
Merrimack	2	Dave Testerman	Rep	Dave Testerman	Rep
Merrimack	3	Greg Hill	Rep	Greg Hill	Rep
Merrimack	3	Ryan Smith	Rep	Joyce Fulweiler	Dem
Merrimack	4	Douglas Long	Rep	Tom Schamberg	Dem
Merrimack	5	Karen Ebel	Dem	Karen Ebel	Dem
Merrimack	5	Dan Wolf	Rep	Dan Wolf	Rep
Merrimack	6	Beth Rodd	Dem	Beth Rodd	Dem
Merrimack	6	David Woolpert	Dem	Rod Pimentel	Dem
Merrimack	7	Clyde Carson	Dem	Clyde Carson	Dem
Merrimack	8	Caroletta Alicea	Dem	Robert Forsythe	Rep
Merrimack	9	Howard Moffett	Dem	Howard Moffett	Dem
Merrimack	9	Michael Moffett	Rep	George Saunderson	Dem
Merrimack	10	David Luneau	Dem	David Luneau	Dem
Merrimack	10	Mel Myler	Dem	Mel Myler	Dem
Merrimack	10	Mary Jane Wallner	Dem	Mary Jane Wallner	Dem
Merrimack	11	Steve Shurtleff	Dem	Steve Shurtleff	Dem
Merrimack	12	Paul Henle	Dem	Connie Lane	Dem
Merrimack	13	Beth Richards	Dem	Beth Richards	Dem
Merrimack	14	James MacKay	Dem	James MacKay	Dem
Merrimack	15	Linda Kenison	Dem	Ryan Buchanan	Dem
Merrimack	16	Timothy Soucy	Dem	Timothy Soucy	Dem
Merrimack	17	Dick Patten	Dem	Safiya Wazir	Dem
Merrimack	18	Kris Schultz	Dem	Kris Schultz	Dem
Merrimack	19	Christy Bartlett	Dem	Christy Bartlett	Dem
Merrimack	20	David Doherty	Dem	David Doherty	Dem
Merrimack	20	Diane Schuett	Dem	Diane Schuett	Dem
Merrimack	20	Brian Seaworth	Rep	Brian Seaworth	Rep
Merrimack	21	Michael Brewster	Rep	James Allard	Rep
Merrimack	21	John Klose	Rep	John Klose	Rep
Merrimack	22	Alan Turcotte	Dem	Alan Turcotte	Dem
Merrimack	23	J.R. Hoell	Rep	Samantha Fox	Dem
Merrimack	23	Bill Kuch	Rep	Gary Woods	Dem
Merrimack	23	Mary Beth Walsh	Dem	Mary Beth Walsh	Dem
Merrimack	24	Frank Kotowski	Rep	Frank Kotowski	Rep
Merrimack	24	John Leavitt	Rep	Michael Yakubovich	Rep
Merrimack	24	Richard Marple	Rep	Richard Marple	Rep
Merrimack	24	Thomas Walsh IV	Rep	Thomas Walsh IV	Rep
Merrimack	25	Natalie Wells	Rep	David Karrick	Dem
Merrimack	26	Howard Pearl	Rep	Howard Pearl	Rep
Merrimack	27	Mary Stuart Gile	Dem	Art Ellison	Dem
Merrimack	27	Vacant (Note: Democrat Harold Rice died January 4, 2018.)		Rebecca McWilliams	Dem
Merrimack	28	Katherine Rogers	Dem	Katherine Rogers	Dem
Merrimack	29	Carol McGuire	Rep	Carol McGuire	Rep
Rockingham	1	Brian Stone	Rep	David Coursin	Dem
Rockingham	2	Jim Nasser	Rep	Alan Bershtein	Rep
Rockingham	2	James Spillane	Rep	James Spillane	Rep
Rockingham	2	Kevin Verville	Rep	Kevin Verville	Rep
Rockingham	3	Michael Costable	Rep	Michael Costable	Rep
Rockingham	3	Kathleen Hoelzel	Rep	Kathleen Hoelzel	Rep
Rockingham	3	Carolyn Matthews	Rep	Kevin Pratt	Rep
Rockingham	4	Jess Edwards	Rep	Jess Edwards	Rep
Rockingham	4	Joseph Hagan	Rep	Becky Owens	Rep
Rockingham	4	Jason Osborne	Rep	Jason Osborne	Rep
Rockingham	4	Chris True	Rep	Chris True	Rep
Rockingham	4	Kari Lerner	Dem	Tony Piemonte	Rep
Rockingham	5	Al Baldasaro	Rep	Al Baldasaro	Rep
Rockingham	5	Martin Bove	Rep	Tom Dolan	Rep
Rockingham	5	David Lundgren	Rep	David Lundgren	Rep
Rockingham	5	Betsy McKinney	Rep	Betsy McKinney	Rep
Rockingham	5	Sherman Packard	Rep	Sherman Packard	Rep
Rockingham	5	Bob Rimol	Rep	Anne Warner	Dem
Rockingham	5	Douglas Thomas	Rep	Douglas Thomas	Rep
Rockingham	6	Brian Chirichiello	Rep	Brian Chirichiello	Rep
Rockingham	6	Patricia Dowling	Rep	Mary Eisner	Dem
Rockingham	6	Bob Fesh	Rep	David Love	Rep
Rockingham	6	Phyllis Katsakiores	Rep	Phyllis Katsakiores	Rep
Rockingham	6	David Milz	Rep	David Milz	Rep
Rockingham	6	John O'Connor	Rep	John O'Connor	Rep
Rockingham	6	Frank Sapareto	Rep	Katherine O'Brien	Rep
Rockingham	6	Richard Tripp	Rep	John Potucek	Rep
Rockingham	6	James C. Webb	Rep	James C. Webb	Rep
Rockingham	6	Brenda Willis	Rep	Stephen Pearson	Rep
Rockingham	7	David Bates	Rep	Joel Desilets	Rep
Rockingham	7	Mary Griffin	Rep	Mary Griffin	Rep
Rockingham	7	Walter Kolodziej	Rep	Walter Kolodziej	Rep
Rockingham	7	Charles McMahon	Rep	Charles McMahon	Rep
Rockingham	8	Vacant (Note: Republican Gary Azarian resigned February 2018.)		Daryl Abbas	Rep
Rockingham	8	Arthur Barnes III	Rep	Arthur Barnes III	Rep
Rockingham	8	Vacant (Note: Republican Ronald J. Belanger died July 14, 2017.)		Ed DeClercq	Rep
Rockingham	8	Vacant (Note: Republican Fred Doucette resigned in November 2017.)		Fred Doucette	Rep
Rockingham	8	Robert Elliott	Rep	Robert Elliott	Rep
Rockingham	8	Betty Gay	Rep	Betty Gay	Rep
Rockingham	8	John Janigian	Rep	John Janigian	Rep
Rockingham	8	John Manning Jr.	Rep	Everett McBride	Rep
Rockingham	8	John Sytek	Rep	John Sytek	Rep
Rockingham	9	Sean Morrison	Rep	Sean Morrison	Rep
Rockingham	9	Michael Vose	Rep	Mark Vallone	Dem
Rockingham	10	Dan Itse	Rep	Dennis Acton	Rep
Rockingham	11	Allen Cook	Rep	Liz McConnell	Dem
Rockingham	12	Steven Woitkun	Rep	Scott Wallace	Rep
Rockingham	13	Dennis Green	Rep	Dennis Green	Rep
Rockingham	13	Joe Guthrie	Rep	Joe Guthrie	Rep
Rockingham	13	David Welch	Rep	David Welch	Rep
Rockingham	13	Kenneth Weyler	Rep	Kenneth Weyler	Rep
Rockingham	14	Debra DeSimone	Rep	Debra DeSimone	Rep
Rockingham	14	William Friel	Rep	Robert Harb	Rep
Rockingham	14	Norman Major	Rep	Norman Major	Rep
Rockingham	14	Peter Torosian	Rep	Peter Torosian	Rep
Rockingham	15	Mary Allen	Rep	Charles Melvin	Rep
Rockingham	16	Bob Nigrello	Rep	Dan Davis	Rep
Rockingham	17	Michael Cahill	Dem	Michael Cahill	Dem
Rockingham	17	Charlotte DiLorenzo	Dem	Charlotte DiLorenzo	Dem
Rockingham	17	Ellen Read	Dem	Ellen Read	Dem
Rockingham	18	Skip Berrien	Dem	Skip Berrien	Dem
Rockingham	18	Elizabeth Farnham	Dem	Lisa Bunker	Dem
Rockingham	18	Paula Francese	Dem	Gaby Grossman	Dem
Rockingham	18	Julie Gilman	Dem	Julie Gilman	Dem
Rockingham	19	Patrick Abrami	Rep	Patrick Abrami	Rep
Rockingham	19	Debra Altschiller	Dem	Debra Altschiller	Dem
Rockingham	20	Francis Chase	Rep	Max Abramson	Rep
Rockingham	20	Jason Janvrin	Rep	William Fowler	Rep
Rockingham	20	Aboul Khan	Rep	Aboul Khan	Rep
Rockingham	21	Philip Bean	Rep	Patricia Bushway	Dem
Rockingham	21	Robert Cushing	Dem	Robert Cushing	Dem
Rockingham	21	Mike Edgar	Dem	Mike Edgar	Dem
Rockingham	21	Tracy Emerick	Rep	Tom Loughman	Dem
Rockingham	22	Henry Marsh	Rep	Jim Maggiore	Dem
Rockingham	23	Dennis Malloy	Dem	Dennis Malloy	Dem
Rockingham	24	Mindi Messmer	Dem	Jaci Grote	Dem
Rockingham	24	Kate Murray	Dem	Kate Murray	Dem
Rockingham	25	Laura Pantelakos	Dem	Laura Pantelakos	Dem
Rockingham	26	Rebecca McBeath	Dem	Rebecca McBeath	Dem
Rockingham	27	Peter Somssich	Dem	Peter Somssich	Dem
Rockingham	28	Gerry Ward	Dem	Gerry Ward	Dem
Rockingham	29	Vacant (Note: Democrat Pamela Gordon resigned May 29, 2018.)		David Meuse	Dem
Rockingham	30	Jacqueline Cali-Pitts	Dem	Jacqueline Cali-Pitts	Dem
Rockingham	31	Tamara Le	Dem	Tamara Le	Dem
Rockingham	32	Vacant (Note: Republican Yvonne Dean-Bailey resigned April 2018.)		Terry Roy	Rep
Rockingham	33	Scott Wallace	Rep	Josh Yokela	Rep
Rockingham	34	Mark Pearson	Rep	Mark Pearson	Rep
Rockingham	35	Richard Gordon	Rep	Deborah Hobson	Rep
Rockingham	36	Patricia Lovejoy	Dem	Patricia Lovejoy	Dem
Rockingham	37	Rio Tilton	Rep	Jason Janvrin	Rep
Strafford	1	Robert Graham	Rep	Peter Hayward	Rep
Strafford	1	John Mullen Jr.	Rep	Abigail Rooney	Rep
Strafford	2	James Horgan	Rep	James Horgan	Rep
Strafford	2	Joseph Pitre	Rep	Joseph Pitre	Rep
Strafford	3	Michael Harrington	Rep	Michael Harrington	Rep
Strafford	3	Kurt Wuelper	Rep	Kurt Wuelper	Rep
Strafford	4	Jackie Cilley	Dem	Cassandra Levesque	Dem
Strafford	4	Len Turcotte	Rep	Matthew Towne	Dem
Strafford	5	Jeffrey Salloway	Dem	Jeffrey Salloway	Dem
Strafford	6	Wayne Burton	Dem	Cam Kenney	Dem
Strafford	6	Timothy Horrigan	Dem	Timothy Horrigan	Dem
Strafford	6	Marjorie Smith	Dem	Marjorie Smith	Dem
Strafford	6	Judith Spang	Dem	Judith Spang	Dem
Strafford	6	Janet Wall	Dem	Janet Wall	Dem
Strafford	7	Timothy Fontneau	Dem	Timothy Fontneau	Dem
Strafford	8	Donna Ellis	Dem	Donna Ellis	Dem
Strafford	9	Steven Beaudoin	Rep	Steven Beaudoin	Rep
Strafford	10	Jody McNally	Rep	Jody McNally	Rep
Strafford	11	Chuck Grassie	Dem	Chuck Grassie	Dem
Strafford	12	Matthew Scruton	Rep	Mac Kittredge	Rep
Strafford	13	Casey Conley	Dem	Casey Conley	Dem
Strafford	14	Hamilton Krans Jr.	Dem	Kristina Fargo	Dem
Strafford	15	Linn Opderbecke	Dem	Linn Opderbecke	Dem
Strafford	16	Sherry Frost	Dem	Sherry Frost	Dem
Strafford	17	Peter Bixby	Dem	Peter Bixby	Dem
Strafford	17	Susan Treleaven	Dem	Susan Treleaven	Dem
Strafford	17	Kenneth Vincent	Dem	Kenneth Vincent	Dem
Strafford	18	Roger Berube	Dem	Gerri Cannon	Dem
Strafford	18	Matthew Spencer	Rep	Wendy Chase	Dem
Strafford	18	Dale Sprague	Dem	Cecilia Rich	Dem
Strafford	19	Peter B. Schmidt	Dem	Peter B. Schmidt	Dem
Strafford	20	Thomas Southworth	Dem	Thomas Southworth	Dem
Strafford	21	Catt Sandler	Dem	Catt Sandler	Dem
Strafford	22	Thomas Kaczynski Jr.	Rep	Peg Higgins	Dem
Strafford	23	Sandra Keans	Dem	Sandra Keans	Dem
Strafford	24	Brandon Phinney	Lib	Mona Perreault	Rep
Strafford	25	Amanda Gourgue	Dem	Amanda Gourgue	Dem
Sullivan	1	Lee Oxenham	Dem	Lee Oxenham	Dem
Sullivan	1	Brian Sullivan	Dem	Brian Sullivan	Dem
Sullivan	2	Sue Gottling	Dem	Gates Lucas	Rep
Sullivan	3	Francis Gauthier	Rep	Andrew O'Hearne	Dem
Sullivan	4	John O'Connor	Rep	Gary Merchant	Dem
Sullivan	5	Raymond Gagnon	Dem	Walter Stapleton	Rep
Sullivan	6	Virginia Irwin	Dem	John Callum	Rep
Sullivan	6	Skip Rollins	Rep	Skip Rollins	Rep
Sullivan	7	Jim Grenier	Rep	Judy Aron	Rep
Sullivan	8	Tom Laware	Rep	Tom Laware	Rep
Sullivan	9	Linda Tanner	Dem	Linda Tanner	Dem
Sullivan	10	John Cloutier	Dem	John Cloutier	Dem
Sullivan	11	Steven D. Smith	Rep	Steven D. Smith	Rep

== Retiring incumbents ==
86 incumbent representatives (54 Republicans and 32 Democrats) did not seek re-election in 2018:

1. Valerie Fraser (R), Belknap 1
2. Marc Abear (R), Belknap 3
3. Norm Silber (R), Belknap 3
4. Herb Vadney (R), Belknap 3
5. Stephen Schmidt (R), Carroll 6
6. Gladys Johnsen (D), Cheshire 7
7. Marge Shephardson (D), Cheshire 10
8. Bing Judd (R), Coos 1
9. Herbert Richardson (R), Coos 4
10. Skylar Boutin (R), Grafton 2
11. Travis Bennett (D), Grafton 8
12. Robert Hull (R), Grafton 9
13. Patricia Higgins (D), Grafton 12
14. Andrew White (D), Grafton 13
15. Brad Bailey (R), Grafton 14
16. David Binford (R), Grafton 15
17. Duane Brown (R), Grafton 16
18. Neal Kurk (R), Hillsborough 2
19. Jonathan Manley (D), Hillsborough 3
20. Rick Christie (R), Hillsborough 6
21. Claire Rouillard (R), Hillsborough 6
22. Nick Zaricki (R), Hillsborough 6
23. Terry Wolf (R), Hillsborough 7
24. Keith Murphy (R), Hillsborough 7
25. Daniel Sullivan (D), Hillsborough 8
26. Elizabeth Edwards (D), Hillsborough 11
27. Richard O'Leary (D), Hillsborough 13
28. Mark MacKenzie (D), Hillsborough 17
29. Armand Forest (D), Hillsborough 18
30. Joel Elber (D), Hillsborough 19
31. Frank Byron (R), Hillsborough 20
32. Josh Moore (R), Hillsborough 21
33. Tony Pellegrino (R), Hillsborough 21
34. Chris Christensen (R), Hillsborough 21
35. Shannon Chandley (D), Hillsborough 22
36. Barbara Biggie (R), Hillsborough 23
37. Craig Moore (R), Hillsborough 25
38. John Carr (R), Hillsborough 26
39. Jan Schmidt (D), Hillsborough 28
40. Suzanne Harvey (D), Hillsborough 29
41. Cindy Rosenwald (D), Hillsborough 30
42. Amelia Keane (D), Hillsborough 31
43. Jessica Ayala (D), Hillsborough 31
44. Steve Negron (R), Hillsborough 32
45. Don LeBrun (R), Hillsborough 32
46. David Murotake (R), Hillsborough 32
47. Timothy Twombly (R), Hillsborough 34
48. David Lisle (D), Hillsborough 35
49. Eric Schleien (R), Hillsborough 37
50. Gregory Smith (R), Hillsborough 37
51. Richard McNamara (D), Hillsborough 38
52. Kathleen Souza (R), Hillsborough 43
53. Ryan Smith (R), Merrimack 3
54. David Woolpert (D), Merrimack 6
55. Caroletta Alicea (D), Merrimack 8
56. Paul Henle (D), Merrimack 12
57. Linda Kenison (D), Merrimack 15
58. J.R. Hoell (R), Merrimack 23
59. Bill Kuch (R), Merrimack 23
60. Mary Stuart Gile (D), Merrimack 27
61. Jim Nasser (R), Rockingham 2
62. Carolyn Matthews (R), Rockingham 3
63. Joseph Hagan (R), Rockingham 4
64. Kari Lerner (D), Rockingham 4
65. Bob Rimol (R), Rockingham 5
66. Martin Bove (R), Rockingham 5
67. Bob Fesh (R), Rockingham 6
68. David Bates (R), Rockingham 7
69. Dan Itse (R), Rockingham 10
70. William Friel (R), Rockingham 14
71. Mary Allen (R), Rockingham 15
72. Bob Nigrello (R), Rockingham 16
73. Elizabeth Farnham (D), Rockingham 18
74. Paula Francese (D), Rockingham 18
75. Francis Chase (R), Rockingham 20
76. Mindi Messmer (D), Rockingham 24
77. Scott Wallace (R), Rockingham 33
78. Richard Gordon (R), Rockingham 35
79. John Mullen (R), Strafford 1
80. Robert Graham (R), Strafford 1
81. Jackie Cilley (D), Strafford 4
82. Len Turcotte (R), Strafford 4
83. Matthew Scruton (R), Strafford 12
84. Hamilton Krans Jr. (D), Strafford 14
85. Raymond Gagnon (D), Sullivan 5
86. Jim Grenier (R), Sullivan 7

== Defeated incumbents ==
=== In primary ===
17 incumbent representatives (11 Republican and 6 Democrats) sought re-election but were defeated in the September 11 primary.

1. Delmar Burridge (D), Cheshire 16
2. Vicki Schwaegler (R), Grafton 3
3. Steven Rand (D), Grafton 8
4. Daniel Donovan (R), Hillsborough 2
5. David Pierce (R), Hillsborough 6
6. Carolyn Gargasz (R), Hillsborough 27
7. Jesse Martineau (D), Hillsborough 42
8. Dick Patten (D), Merrimack 17
9. Michael Brewster (R), Merrimack 21
10. John Leavitt (R), Merrimack 24
11. Brian Stone (R), Rockingham 1
12. Patricia Dowling (R), Rockingham 6
13. Richard Tripp (R), Rockingham 6
14. Brenda Willis (R), Rockingham 6
15. John Manning Jr. (R), Rockingham 8
16. Wayne Burton (D), Strafford 6
17. Roger Berube (D), Strafford 18

=== In general election ===
42 incumbent representatives (35 Republicans, 5 Democrats and 2 Libertarians) sought re-election but were defeated in the November 6 general election.

1. Philip Spagnuolo Jr. (D), Belknap 3
2. Gene G. Chandler (R), Carroll 1
3. Karen Umberger (R), Carroll 2
4. Frank McCarthy (R), Carroll 2
5. Mark McConkey (R), Carroll 3
6. Jim McConnell (R), Cheshire 12
7. Frank Sterling Jr. (R), Cheshire 14
8. Robert Theberge (R), Coos 3
9. Herbert Richardson (D), Coos 4
10. Bonnie Ham (R), Grafton 5
11. Tiffany Johnson (R), Grafton 7
12. Stephen Darrow (R), Grafton 17
13. Glen Dickey (R), Hillsborough 5
14. Lisa Freeman (R), Hillsborough 12
15. Victoria Sullivan (R), Hillsborough 16
16. Peter Hansen (R), Hillsborough 22
17. Carolyn Halstead (R), Hillsborough 23
18. Elizabeth Ferreira (R), Hillsborough 28
19. Carl Siedel (R), Hillsborough 28
20. Mariellen MacKay (R), Hillsborough 30
21. Kevin Scully (R), Hillsborough 33
22. Bill Ohm (R), Hillsborough 36
23. Caleb Q. Dyer (L), Hillsborough 37
24. John Valera (R), Hillsborough 38
25. Keith Ammon (R), Hillsborough 40
26. Douglas Long (R), Merrimack 4
27. Michael Moffett (R), Merrimack 9
28. Natalie Wells (R), Merrimack 25
29. Frank Sapareto (R), Rockingham 6
30. Michael Vose (R), Rockingham 9
31. Allen Cook (R), Rockingham 11
32. Philip Bean (R), Rockingham 21
33. Tracy Emerick (R), Rockingham 21
34. Henry Marsh (R), Rockingham 22
35. Matthew Spencer (R), Strafford 18
36. Dale Sprague (D), Strafford 18 (Note: Ran as an independent for reelection after bypassing the Democratic primary.)
37. Thomas Kaczynski Jr. (R), Strafford 22
38. Brandon Phinney (L), Strafford 24
39. Sue Gottling (D), Sullivan 2
40. Francis Gauthier (R), Sullivan 3
41. John O'Connor (R), Sullivan 4
42. Virginia Irwin (D), Sullivan 6

== Predictions ==
Source	Ranking	As of
Governing	Lean D (flip)	October 8, 2018

== Detailed results ==
=== Belknap County ===
==== Belknap 1 ====
- Elects one representative

Belknap District 1 general election, 2018
Party	Candidate	Votes	%
Republican	Harry Viens	923	53.9
Democratic	Ruth Gulick	788	46.1
Total votes		1,711	100.0
Republican hold			

==== Belknap 2 ====
- Elects four representatives

Republican primary

Belknap District 2 Republican primary
Party	Candidate	Votes	%
Republican	Harry Bean	920	19.6
Republican	Glen Aldrich (incumbent)	892	19.0
Republican	Deanna Jurius	650	13.7
Republican	Jonathan Mackie	621	13.2
Republican	Timothy Sullivan	571	12.8
Republican	Rick Notkin	550	11.7
Republican	Michael Hatch	485	10.3
Total votes		4,689	100.0

General election

Belknap District 2 general election, 2018
Party	Candidate	Votes	%
Republican	Deanna Jurius	3,337	13.4
Republican	Harry Bean	3,331	13.3
Republican	Glen Aldrich (incumbent)	3,324	13.3
Republican	Jonathan Mackie	3,143	12.6
Democratic	Diane Hanley	2,941	11.8
Democratic	Rosemary Uicker	2,830	11.3
Democratic	Dorothy Piquado	2,826	11.3
Democratic	Stephen McBrian	2,436	9.8
Independent	Eliza Leadbeater	808	3.2
Total votes		24,976	100.0
Republican hold			
Republican hold			
Republican hold			
Republican hold			

==== Belknap 3 ====
- Elects four representatives

Belknap District 3 general election, 2018
Party	Candidate	Votes	%
Republican	Frank Tilton (incumbent)	3,002	14.0
Republican	Peter Spanos (incumbent)	3,000	14.0
Democratic	Peter Huot (incumbent)	2,875	13.4
Republican	Richard Beaudoin	2,587	13.3
Democratic	Gail Ober	2,586	13.3
Democratic	Philip Spagnulo (incumbent)	2,542	11.6
Republican	Hans Larsson	2,504	11.7
Democratic	Carlos Cardona	2,344	10.9
Total votes		21,440	100.0
Republican hold			
Republican hold			
Democratic hold			
Republican gain from Democratic			

==== Belknap 4 ====
- Elects two representatives

Republican primary

Belknap District 4 Republican primary
Party	Candidate	Votes	%
Republican	Dennis Fields (incumbent)	323	31.2
Republican	Timothy Lang (incumbent)	297	28.7
Republican	John Olmstead	257	24.8
Republican	Richard Brothers	87	8.4
Republican	John Vorel	72	6.9
Total votes		1,036	100.0

Democratic primary

Belknap District 4 Democratic primary
Party	Candidate	Votes	%
Democratic	Stanley Robinson	423	43.8
Democratic	Charles Mitchell	392	40.6
Democratic	Griffin Fredette	150	15.5
Total votes		965	100.0

General election

Belknap District 4 general election, 2018
Party	Candidate	Votes	%
Republican	Dennis Fields (incumbent)	1,422	27.4
Republican	Timothy Lang (incumbent)	1,380	26.6
Democratic	Stanley Robinson	1,200	23.1
Democratic	Charles Mitchell	1,184	22.8
Total votes		5,186	100.0
Republican hold			
Republican hold			

==== Belknap 5 ====
- Elects two representatives

Belknap District 5 general election, 2018
Party	Candidate	Votes	%
Republican	George Feeney	2,512	31.4
Republican	Peter Varney (incumbent)	2,404	30.0
Democratic	Betty Ann Abbott	1,621	20.2
Democratic	Michelle Carter	1,463	18.3
Total votes		8,000	100.0
Republican hold			
Republican hold			

==== Belknap 6 ====
- Elects two representatives

Belknap District 6 general election, 2018
Party	Candidate	Votes	%
Republican	John Plumer (incumbent)	1,442	30.7
Republican	Mike Sylvia (incumbent)	1,418	30.2
Democratic	Justin Borden	1,004	21.4
Democratic	George Condodemetraky	828	17.6
Total votes		4,692	100.0
Republican hold			
Republican hold			

==== Belknap 7 ====
- Elects one representative

Belknap District 7 general election, 2018
Party	Candidate	Votes	%
Republican	Barbara Comtois (incumbent)	1,078	55.3
Democratic	Katherine Preston	872	44.7
Total votes		1,950	100.0
Republican hold			

==== Belknap 8 ====
- Elects one representative

Belknap District 8 general election, 2018
Party	Candidate	Votes	%
Republican	Raymond Howard (incumbent)	3,670	58.5
Democratic	Ruth Larson	2,600	41.5
Total votes		6,270	100.0
Republican hold			

==== Belknap 9 ====
- Elects one representative

Belknap District 9 general election, 2018
Party	Candidate	Votes	%
Democratic	Charlie St. Clair (incumbent)	4,350	50.2
Republican	Steven Whalley	4,315	49.8
Total votes		8,665	100.0
Democratic hold			

=== Carroll County ===
==== Carroll 1 ====
- Elects one representative

Democratic primary

Carroll District 1 Democratic primary
Party	Candidate	Votes	%
Democratic	Anita Burroughs	433	56.9
Democratic	Erik Corbett	328	43.1
Total votes		761	100.0

General election

Carroll District 1 general election, 2018
Party	Candidate	Votes	%
Democratic	Anita Burroughs	1,281	54.4
Republican	Gene G. Chandler (incumbent)	1,074	45.6
Total votes		2,355	100.0
Democratic gain from Republican			

==== Carroll 2 ====
- Elects three representatives

Carroll District 2 general election, 2018
Party	Candidate	Votes	%
Democratic	Tom Buco (incumbent)	2,323	19.8
Democratic	Harrison Kanzler	2,304	19.6
Democratic	Stephen Woodcock	2,187	18.6
Republican	Karen Umberger (incumbent)	1,819	15.5
Republican	Frank McCarthy (incumbent)	1,696	14.4
Republican	William Cuccio	1,400	11.9
Total votes		11,729	100.0
Democratic hold			
Democratic gain from Republican			
Democratic gain from Republican			

==== Carroll 3 ====
- Elects two representatives

Carroll District 3 general election, 2018
Party	Candidate	Votes	%
Democratic	Jerry Knirk (incumbent)	1,911	35.1
Democratic	Susan Ticehurst	1,861	34.2
Republican	Mark McConkey (incumbent)	1,677	30.8
Total votes		5,449	100.0
Democratic hold			
Democratic gain from Republican			

==== Carroll 4 ====
- Elects two representatives

Democratic primary

Carroll District 4 Democratic primary
Party	Candidate	Votes	%
Democratic	Caroline Nesbitt	793	49.5
Democratic	John Morrissey	526	26.6
Democratic	Paul Punturieri	282	17.6
Total votes		1,601	100.0

General election

Carroll District 4 general election, 2018
Party	Candidate	Votes	%
Republican	Glenn Cordelli (incumbent)	2,504	28.1
Republican	Karel Crawford (incumbent)	2,479	27.8
Democratic	Caroline Nesbitt	2,004	22.4
Democratic	John Morrissey	1,938	21.7
Total votes		8,925	100.0
Republican hold			
Republican hold			

==== Carroll 5 ====
- Elects three representatives

Carroll District 5 general election, 2018
Party	Candidate	Votes	%
Republican	Bill Nelson (incumbent)	2,424	20.29
Republican	Lino Avellani (incumbent)	2,422	20.27
Republican	Ed Comeau (incumbent)	2,407	20.16
Democratic	Theresa Swanick	1,651	13.82
Democratic	Patricia Pustell	1,530	12.81
Democratic	Knute Ogren	1,511	12.64
Total votes		11,945	100.0
Republican hold			
Republican hold			
Republican hold			

==== Carroll 6 ====
- Elects two representatives

Republican primary

Carroll District 6 Republican primary
Party	Candidate	Votes	%
Republican	John MacDonald	557	44.7
Republican	Matthew Plache	538	43.1
Republican	Seamas Oscalaidhe	152	12.2
Total votes		1,247	100.0

General election

Carroll District 6 general election, 2018
Party	Candidate	Votes	%
Republican	John MacDonald	1,859	27.3
Democratic	Edith DesMarais (incumbent)	1,738	25.6
Republican	Matthew Plache	1,647	24.2
Democratic	David Owen	1,554	22.9
Total votes		6,798	100.0
Republican hold			
Democratic hold			

==== Carroll 7 ====
- Elects one representative

Carroll District 7 general election, 2018
Party	Candidate	Votes	%
Democratic	Ed Butler (incumbent)	6,317	61.3
Republican	Joseph Mosca	3,990	38.7
Total votes		10,307	100.0
Democratic hold			

==== Carroll 8 ====
- Elects one representative

Republican primary

Carroll District 8 Republican primary
Party	Candidate	Votes	%
Republican	William Marsh (incumbent)	1,458	72.0
Republican	Richard Surette	567	28.0
Total votes		2,025	100.0

General election

Carroll District 8 general election, 2018
Party	Candidate	Votes	%
Republican	William Marsh (incumbent)	5,639	60.3
Democratic	Richard Stuart	3,717	39.7
Total votes		9,356	100.0
Republican hold			

=== Cheshire County ===
==== Cheshire 1 ====
- Elects four representatives

Cheshire District 1 general election, 2018
Party	Candidate	Votes	%
Democratic	Michael Abbot (incumbent)	3,458	21.9
Democratic	Cathryn Harvey (incumbent)	3,369	21.3
Democratic	Lucy Weber (incumbent)	3,358	21.2
Democratic	Paul Berch (incumbent)	3,270	20.7
Republican	Kate Day	2,336	14.8
Total votes		15,791	100.0
Democratic hold			
Democratic hold			
Democratic hold			
Democratic hold			

==== Cheshire 2 ====
- Elects one representative

Republican primary

Cheshire District 2 Republican primary
Party	Candidate	Votes	%
Republican	Anne Cartwright	169	65.5
Republican	Richard Nalevanko	89	34.5
Total votes		258	100.0

General election

Cheshire District 2 general election, 2018
Party	Candidate	Votes	%
Democratic	John Mann (incumbent)	908	55.9
Republican	Anne Cartwright	716	44.1
Total votes		1,624	100.0
Democratic hold			

==== Cheshire 3 ====
- Elects one representative

Cheshire District 3 general election, 2018
Party	Candidate	Votes	%
Democratic	Daniel Eaton	916	57.0
Republican	Robert D'Arcy	690	43.0
Total votes		1,606	100.0
Democratic hold			

==== Cheshire 4 ====
- Elects one representative

Cheshire District 4 general election, 2018
Party	Candidate	Votes	%
Democratic	David Morrill	974	84.9
Libertarian	David Crawford	173	15.1
Total votes		1,147	100.0
Democratic gain from Libertarian			

==== Cheshire 5 ====
- Elects one representative

Cheshire District 5 general election, 2018
Party	Candidate	Votes	%
Democratic	John Bordenet (incumbent)	1,475	99.5
Total votes		1,482	100.0
Democratic hold			

==== Cheshire 6 ====
- Elects one representative

Cheshire District 6 general election, 2018
Party	Candidate	Votes	%
Democratic	David Meader (incumbent)	1,391	98.9
Total votes		1,406	100.0
Democratic hold			

==== Cheshire 7 ====
- Elects one representative

Cheshire District 7 general election, 2018
Party	Candidate	Votes	%
Democratic	Sparky Von Plinsky	1,398	85.1
Libertarian	Robert Call	244	14.9
Total votes		1,642	100.0
Democratic hold			

==== Cheshire 8 ====
- Elects one representative

Cheshire District 8 general election, 2018
Party	Candidate	Votes	%
Democratic	Donovan Fenton (incumbent)	1,576	70.4
Republican	John Terriault	661	29.6
Total votes		2,237	100.0
Democratic hold			

==== Cheshire 9 ====
- Elects two representatives

Cheshire District 9 general election, 2018
Party	Candidate	Votes	%
Democratic	Richard Ames (incumbent)	2,255	38.6
Democratic	Douglas Ley (incumbent)	2,096	35.8
Republican	Christopher Mazerall	1,498	25.6
Total votes		5,849	100.0
Democratic hold			
Democratic hold			

==== Cheshire 10 ====
- Elects one representative

Cheshire District 10 general election, 2018
Party	Candidate	Votes	%
Democratic	Sandy Swinburne	1,020	61.7
Republican	Ed Bryans	633	38.3
Total votes		1,653	100.0
Democratic hold			

==== Cheshire 11 ====
- Elects two representatives

Cheshire District 11 general election, 2018
Party	Candidate	Votes	%
Republican	John B. Hunt (incumbent)	1,947	29.9
Republican	John O'Day (incumbent)	1,684	25.8
Democratic	Patricia Martin	1,449	22.2
Democratic	Susan Silverman	1,439	22.1
Total votes		6,519	100.0
Republican hold			
Republican hold			

==== Cheshire 12 ====
- Elects two representatives

Cheshire District 12 general election, 2018
Party	Candidate	Votes	%
Democratic	Jennie Gomarlo	1,811	30.0
Democratic	Barry Faulkner (incumbent)	1,561	25.0
Republican	Jim McConnell (incumbent)	1,518	24.3
Republican	David Pierce	1,358	21.7
Total votes		6,248	100.0
Democratic hold			
Democratic gain from Republican			

==== Cheshire 13 ====
- Elects one representative

Cheshire District 13 general election, 2018
Party	Candidate	Votes	%
Democratic	Henry Parkhurst (incumbent)	763	58.6
Republican	Chester Lapointe	538	41.4
Total votes		1,301	100.0
Democratic hold			

==== Cheshire 14 ====
- Elects one representative

Cheshire District 14 general election, 2018
Party	Candidate	Votes	%
Democratic	Craig Thompson	3,671	50.8
Republican	Franklin Sterling (incumbent)	3,550	49.2
Total votes		7,221	100.0
Democratic gain from Republican			

==== Cheshire 15 ====
- Elects one representative

Cheshire District 15 general election, 2018
Party	Candidate	Votes	%
Democratic	Bruce Tatro (incumbent)	3,579	57.2
Republican	Stephen Malone	2,674	42.8
Total votes		6,253	100.0
Democratic hold			

==== Cheshire 16 ====
- Elects two representatives

Democratic primary

Cheshire District 16 Democratic primary
Party	Candidate	Votes	%
Democratic	Joe Schapiro	2,030	50.0
Democratic	William Pearson (incumbent)	1,037	25.5
Democratic	Delmar Burridge (incumbent)	996	24.5
Total votes		4,063	100.0

General election

Cheshire District 15 general election, 2018
Party	Candidate	Votes	%
Democratic	Joe Schapiro	6,200	47.5
Democratic	William Pearson (incumbent)	5,805	44.5
Libertarian	Daryl Perry	1,034	7.9
Total votes		13,039	100.0
Democratic hold			

=== Coös County ===
==== Coös 1 ====
- Elects two representatives

Coös District 1 general election, 2018
Party	Candidate	Votes	%
Republican	Jon Fothergill (incumbent)	1,501	55.1
Republican	Michael Furbush	1,191	43.8
Total votes		2,722	100.0
Republican hold			
Republican hold			

==== Coös 2 ====
- Elects one representative

Coös District 2 general election, 2018
Party	Candidate	Votes	%
Democratic	Wayne Moynihan (incumbent)	1,026	98.8
Total votes		1,038	100.0
Democratic hold			

==== Coös 3 ====
- Elects three representatives

Coös District 3 general election, 2018
Party	Candidate	Votes	%
Democratic	Larry Laflamme (incumbent)	1,638	23.9
Democratic	Yvonne Thomas (incumbent)	1,523	22.2
Democratic	Henry Noel	1,474	21.5
Republican	Robert Theberge (incumbent)	1,290	18.8
Republican	Gaston Gingues	749	10.9
Libertarian	Stuart Light	191	2.8
Total votes		6,865	100.0
Democratic hold			
Democratic hold			
Democratic gain from Republican			

==== Coös 4 ====
- Elects one representative

Coös District 4 general election, 2018
Party	Candidate	Votes	%
Republican	Kevin Craig	786	50.1
Democratic	Herb Richardson (incumbent)	782	49.9
Total votes		1,568	100.0
Republican gain from Democratic			

==== Coös 5 ====
- Elects one representative

Coös District 5 general election, 2018
Party	Candidate	Votes	%
Democratic	Edith Tucker (incumbent)	1,300	98.4
Total votes		1,321	100.0
Democratic hold			

==== Coös 6 ====
- Elects one representative

Coös District 6 general election, 2018
Party	Candidate	Votes	%
Democratic	William Hatch (incumbent)	893	99.0
Total votes		902	100.0
Democratic hold			

==== Coös 7 ====
- Elects one representative

Coös District 7 general election, 2018
Party	Candidate	Votes	%
Republican	Troy Merner (incumbent)	2,672	53.2
Democratic	Cathleen Fountain	2,347	46.8
Total votes		5,019	100.0
Republican hold			

=== Grafton County ===
==== Grafton 1 ====
- Elects two representatives

Grafton District 1 general election, 2018
Party	Candidate	Votes	%
Democratic	Linda Massimilla (incumbent)	1,882	30.1
Republican	Erin Hennessey (incumbent)	1,729	27.7
Democratic	Jan Edick	1,412	22.6
Republican	Calvin Beaulier	1,222	19.6
Total votes		6,245	100.0
Democratic hold			
Republican hold			

==== Grafton 2 ====
- Elects one representative

Grafton District 2 general election, 2018
Party	Candidate	Votes	%
Democratic	Timothy Egan	1,208	55.6
Republican	Robert Peraino	963	44.4
Total votes		2,171	100.0
Democratic gain from Republican			

==== Grafton 3 ====
- Elects one representative

Republican primary

Grafton District 3 Republican primary
Party	Candidate	Votes	%
Republican	Ben Hight	211	51.7
Republican	Vicki Schwaegler	197	48.3
Total votes		408	100.0

General election

Grafton District 3 general election, 2018
Party	Candidate	Votes	%
Democratic	Susan Ford (incumbent)	1,238	55.1
Republican	Ben Hight	1,009	44.9
Total votes		2,247	100.0
Democratic hold			

==== Grafton 4 ====
- Elects one representative

Grafton District 4 general election, 2018
Party	Candidate	Votes	%
Republican	Rick Ladd (incumbent)	1,186	98.1
Total votes		1,203	100.0
Republican hold			

==== Grafton 5 ====
- Elects one representative

Grafton District 5 general election, 2018
Party	Candidate	Votes	%
Democratic	Jerry Stringham	749	50.4
Republican	Bonnie Ham (incumbent)	735	49.5
Total votes		1,486	100.0
Democratic gain from Republican			

==== Grafton 6 ====
- Elects one representative

Grafton District 6 general election, 2018
Party	Candidate	Votes	%
Democratic	Kevin Maes (incumbent)	1,174	51.7
Republican	Gail Sanborn	1,095	48.3
Total votes		2,269	100.0
Democratic hold			

==== Grafton 7 ====
- Elects one representative

Grafton District 7 general election, 2018
Party	Candidate	Votes	%
Democratic	Richard Osborne	809	52.4
Republican	Tiffany Johnson (incumbent)	735	47.6
Total votes		1,544	100.0
Democratic gain from Republican			

==== Grafton 8 ====
- Elects three representatives

Democratic primary

Grafton District 8 Democratic primary
Party	Candidate	Votes	%
Democratic	Suzanne Smith (incumbent)	747	27.4
Democratic	Sallie Fellows	730	26.7
Democratic	Joyce Weston	637	23.3
Democratic	Steven Rand (incumbent)	615	22.5
Total votes		2,729	100.0

General election

Grafton District 8 general election, 2018
Party	Candidate	Votes	%
Democratic	Suzanne Smith (incumbent)	2,528	22.8
Democratic	Sallie Fellows	2,447	22.1
Democratic	Joyce Weston	2,360	21.3
Republican	Lynn Durham	1,309	11.8
Republican	David Nash	1,291	11.7
Republican	Mark Marquis	1,146	10.3
Total votes		11,081	100.0
Democratic hold			
Democratic hold			
Democratic hold			

==== Grafton 9 ====
- Elects two representatives

Republican primary

Grafton District 9 Republican primary
Party	Candidate	Votes	%
Republican	Ned Gordon	649	48.4
Republican	Vincent Migliore (incumbent)	489	36.5
Republican	Heidi Milbrand	203	15.1
Total votes		1,341	100.0

General election

Grafton District 9 general election, 2018
Party	Candidate	Votes	%
Republican	Ned Gordon	2,386	34.0
Republican	Vincent Migliore (incumbent)	1,723	24.6
Democratic	Catherine Mulholland	1,558	22.2
Democratic	Tejasinha Sivalingam	1,054	15.0
Libertarian	John Babiarz	175	2.5
Libertarian	Rosalie Babiarz	113	1.6
Total votes		7,009	100.0
Republican hold			
Republican hold			

==== Grafton 10 ====
- Elects one representative

Grafton District 10 general election, 2018
Party	Candidate	Votes	%
Democratic	Roger Dontonville	1,421	98.3
Total votes		1,445	100.0
Democratic hold			

==== Grafton 11 ====
- Elects one representative

Grafton District 11 general election, 2018
Party	Candidate	Votes	%
Democratic	Timothy Josephson (incumbent)	1,042	52.9
Republican	Roy Russell	927	47.1
Total votes		1,969	100.0
Democratic hold			

==== Grafton 12 ====
- Elects four representatives

Grafton District 12 general election, 2018
Party	Candidate	Votes	%
Democratic	Sharon Nordgren (incumbent)	5,712	24.5
Democratic	Polly Campion (incumbent)	5,699	24.4
Democratic	Garrett Muscatel	5,582	24.0
Democratic	Mary Jane Mulligan (incumbent)	5,155	22.1
Republican	Baronet Harrington	1,152	4.9
Total votes		23,300	100.0
Democratic hold			
Democratic hold			
Democratic hold			
Democratic hold			

==== Grafton 13 ====
- Elects four representatives

Grafton District 13 general election, 2018
Party	Candidate	Votes	%
Democratic	Susan Almy (incumbent)	4,422	23.4
Democratic	George Sykes (incumbent)	4,328	22.9
Democratic	Laurel Stavis	4,318	22.8
Democratic	Richard Abel (incumbent)	4,202	22.2
Republican	Michael Balog	1,636	8.7
Total votes		18,906	100.0
Democratic hold			
Democratic hold			
Democratic hold			
Democratic hold			

==== Grafton 14 ====
- Elects one representative

Grafton District 14 general election, 2018
Party	Candidate	Votes	%
Democratic	Elaine French	2,915	53.7
Republican	Dennis Wagner	2,515	46.3
Total votes		5,430	100.0
Democratic gain from Republican			

==== Grafton 15 ====
- Elects one representative

Republican primary

Grafton District 15 Republican primary
Party	Candidate	Votes	%
Republican	Rebecca Bailey	391	52.2
Republican	Tom Friel	358	47.8
Total votes		749	100.0

General election

Grafton District 15 general election, 2018
Party	Candidate	Votes	%
Democratic	Denny Ruprecht	2,127	55.0
Republican	Rebecca Bailey	1,737	45.0
Total votes		3,864	100.0
Democratic gain from Republican			

==== Grafton 16 ====
- Elects one representative

Grafton District 16 general election, 2018
Party	Candidate	Votes	%
Democratic	Francesca Diggs	2,129	52.3
Republican	Linda Luhtala	2,000	47.7
Total votes		4,192	100.0
Democratic gain from Republican			

==== Grafton 17 ====
- Elects one representative

Grafton District 17 general election, 2018
Party	Candidate	Votes	%
Democratic	Joshua Adjutant	3,088	52.6
Republican	Stephen Darrow (incumbent)	2,782	47.4
Total votes		5,870	100.0
Democratic gain from Republican			

=== Hillsborough County ===
==== Hillsborough 1 ====
- Elects two representatives

Hillsborough District 1 general election, 2018
Party	Candidate	Votes	%
Republican	Jim Fedolfi (incumbent)	1,745	32.8
Democratic	Marjorie Porter (incumbent)	1,676	31.5
Democratic	Richard McNamara	1,536	28.9
Libertarian	Keith Cobbett	365	6.8
Total votes		5,322	100.0
Republican hold			
Democratic hold			

==== Hillsborough 2 ====
- Elects three representatives

Republican primary

Hillsborough District 2 Republican primary
Party	Candidate	Votes	%
Republican	Keith Erf	706	31.5
Republican	JP Marzullo	531	22.7
Republican	Gary Hopper (incumbent)	479	20.4
Republican	Daniel Donovan (incumbent)	237	10.1
Republican	David Recupero	221	9.5
Republican	Lori Davis	160	6.8
Total votes		2,334	100.0

General election

Hillsborough District 2 general election, 2018
Party	Candidate	Votes	%
Republican	Keith Erf	2,236	19.3
Republican	Gary Hopper (incumbent)	2,019	17.4
Republican	JP Marzullo	1,912	16.5
Democratic	Aaron Gill	1,883	16.2
Democratic	Rebecca Mitchell	1,408	12.1
Democratic	Rachel Sisto	1,385	11.9
Libertarian	Lisa Wilber	755	6.5
Total votes		11,598	100.0
Republican hold			
Republican hold			
Republican hold			

==== Hillsborough 3 ====
- Elects one representative

Hillsborough District 3 general election, 2018
Party	Candidate	Votes	%
Democratic	Dan Pickering	1,331	55.4
Republican	Tim Lord	1,037	44.6
Total votes		2,402	100.0
Democratic hold			

==== Hillsborough 4 ====
- Elects two representatives

Hillsborough District 4 general election, 2018
Party	Candidate	Votes	%
Democratic	Jennifer Bernet	2,073	26.7
Democratic	Kermit Williams (incumbent)	2,001	25.8
Republican	Jim Kofalt	1,886	24.3
Republican	Ron Shattuck	1,804	23.2
Total votes		7,764	100.0
Democratic hold			
Democratic hold			

==== Hillsborough 5 ====
- Elects two representatives

Hillsborough District 5 general election, 2018
Party	Candidate	Votes	%
Democratic	David Woodbury	2,001	25.9
Democratic	Donna Mombourquette	1,944	25.1
Republican	Gerald Griffin (incumbent)	1,936	25.0
Republican	Glen Dickey (incumbent)	1,851	23.9
Total votes		7,736	100.0
Democratic gain from Republican			
Democratic gain from Republican			

==== Hillsborough 6 ====
- Elects five representatives

Republican primary

Hillsborough District 6 Republican primary
Party	Candidate	Votes	%
Republican	Michael Gunski	372	16.9
Republican	Barbara Griffin (incumbent)	368	16.7
Republican	Fred Plett	334	15.2
Republican	Jeffrey Day	325	14.8
Republican	Joe Alexander	292	13.3
Republican	Dave Pearce (incumbent)	270	12.3
Republican	John Stafford	235	10.7
Total votes		2,196	100.0

General election

Hillsborough District 6 general election, 2018
Party	Candidate	Votes	%
Republican	Barbara Griffin (incumbent)	3,376	11.1
Republican	Michael Gunski	3,279	10.8
Democratic	Cole Riel	3,039	10.0
Republican	Fred Plett	3,009	9.9
Republican	Joe Alexander	2,966	9.74
Republican	Jeffrey Day	2,957	9.71
Democratic	Judi Lanza	2,930	9.6
Democratic	Reta MacGregor	2,879	9.4
Democratic	Melanie Renfrew-Hebert	2,876	9.4
Democratic	Eric Emmerling	2,605	8.5
Libertarian	Richard Manzo	517	1.7
Total votes		30,439	100.0
Republican hold			
Republican hold			
Democratic gain from Republican			
Republican hold			
Republican hold			

==== Hillsborough 7 ====
- Elects six representatives

Republican primary

Hillsborough District 7 general election, 2018
Party	Candidate	Votes	%
Republican	Linda Gould (incumbent)	1,620	16.8
Republican	Bart Fromuth (incumbent)	1,448	14.7
Republican	David Danielson (incumbent)	1,345	13.7
Republican	John Graham (incumbent)	1,237	12.6
Republican	Linda Camarota	1,189	12.1
Republican	Michael Trento	1,069	10.9
Republican	Phil Griazzo	1,006	10.2
Republican	Robin Milnes	913	9.3
Total votes		9,827	100.0

Democratic primary

Hillsborough District 7 Democratic primary
Party	Candidate	Votes	%
Democratic	Sue Mullen	1,910	24.8
Democratic	Catherine Rombeau	1,265	16.7
Democratic	Wayne Goldner	1,118	16.5
Democratic	Kamee Leshner	944	12.3
Democratic	Richard Friedman	942	12.2
Democratic	Jerry Hanauer	909	11.8
Democratic	Frank Anthony	597	7.8
Total votes		7,685	100.0

General election

Hillsborough District 7 general election, 2018
Party	Candidate	Votes	%
Democratic	Sue Mullen	5,569	10.0
Republican	Linda Gould (incumbent)	5,470	9.9
Republican	David Danielson (incumbent)	5,128	9.2
Republican	John Graham (incumbent)	4,919	8.9
Republican	Michael Trento	4,908	8.8
Republican	Linda Camarota	4,840	8.7
Republican	Bart Fromuth (incumbent)	4,781	8.6
Democratic	Catherine Rombeau	4,275	7.7
Democratic	Wayne Goldner	3,944	7.1
Democratic	Kamee Leshner	3,747	6.7
Democratic	Richard Friedman	3,717	6.7
Democratic	Jerry Hanauer	3,571	6.4
Libertarian	Spencer Dias	583	1.1
Total votes		55,452	100.0
Democratic gain from Republican			
Republican hold			
Republican hold			
Republican hold			
Republican hold			
Republican hold			

==== Hillsborough 8 ====
- Elects two representatives

Democratic primary

Hillsborough District 8 Democratic primary
Party	Candidate	Votes	%
Democratic	Jeff Goley (incumbent)	784	38.2
Democratic	Diane Langley	656	32.0
Democratic	Christine Siebert	611	29.8
Total votes		2,051	100.0

General election

Hillsborough District 8 general election, 2018
Party	Candidate	Votes	%
Democratic	Jeff Goley (incumbent)	2,313	35.8
Democratic	Diane Langley	2,242	34.7
Republican	Andrew Fromuth	1,905	29.5
Total votes		6,460	100.0
Democratic hold			
Democratic hold			

==== Hillsborough 9 ====
- Elects two representatives

Democratic primary

Hillsborough District 9 Democratic primary
Party	Candidate	Votes	%
Democratic	Linda DiSilvestro (incumbent)	756	48.5
Democratic	Iz Piedra	520	33.3
Democratic	Thomas Evans	283	18.2
Total votes		1,559	100.0

General election

Hillsborough District 9 general election, 2018
Party	Candidate	Votes	%
Democratic	Linda DiSilvestro (incumbent)	2,149	32.2
Democratic	Iz Piedra	1,825	27.3
Republican	Doug Whitfield	1,394	20.9
Republican	Anthony Pugh	1,304	19.5
Total votes		6,672	100.0
Democratic hold			
Democratic hold			

==== Hillsborough 10 ====
- Elects two representatives

Hillsborough District 10 general election, 2018
Party	Candidate	Votes	%
Democratic	Pat Long (incumbent)	1,402	34.7
Democratic	Jean Jeudy (incumbent)	1,339	33.1
Republican	Daniel Heck	601	14.9
Republican	Holly Seal	580	14.3
Libertarian	Nicholas Goroff	118	2.9
Total votes		4,040	100.0
Democratic hold			
Democratic hold			

==== Hillsborough 11 ====
- Elects two representatives

Democratic primary

Hillsborough District 11 Democratic primary
Party	Candidate	Votes	%
Democratic	Nicole Klein	447	48.5
Democratic	Donald Bouchard	321	34.9
Democratic	Daniel Cuevas	153	16.6
Total votes		921	100.0

Republican primary

Hillsborough District 11 Republican primary
Party	Candidate	Votes	%
Republican	Jean Mathieu	244	49.9
Republican	Mikey Leviss	125	25.6
Republican	Colin Gibson	120	24.5
Total votes		489	100.0

General election

Hillsborough District 11 general election, 2018
Party	Candidate	Votes	%
Democratic	Nicole Klein	1,294	30.9
Democratic	Donald Bouchard	1,268	30.3
Republican	Jean Mathieu	886	21.2
Republican	Mikey Leviss	737	17.6
Total votes		4,185	100.0
Democratic hold			
Democratic hold			

==== Hillsborough 12 ====
- Elects two representatives

Hillsborough District 12 general election, 2018
Party	Candidate	Votes	%
Democratic	Amanda Bouldin (incumbent)	1,063	39.0
Democratic	Andrew Bouldin	940	34.5
Republican	Lisa Freeman (incumbent)	886	32.5
Total votes		2,728	100.0
Democratic hold			
Democratic gain from Republican			

==== Hillsborough 13 ====
- Elects two representatives

Hillsborough District 13 general election, 2018
Party	Candidate	Votes	%
Democratic	Kathy Desjardin	1,789	26.6
Republican	Larry Gagne (incumbent)	1,771	26.3
Democratic	Peter Macone	1,621	24.1
Republican	Kirk McConville	1,557	23.1
Total votes		6,738	100.0
Democratic hold			
Republican hold			

==== Hillsborough 14 ====
- Elects two representatives

Democratic primary

Hillsborough District 14 Democratic primary
Party	Candidate	Votes	%
Democratic	Mary Freitas (incumbent)	467	45.4
Democratic	Mary Heath (incumbent)	438	42.5
Democratic	Roger Francoeur	125	12.1
Total votes		1,030	100.0

General election

Hillsborough District 14 general election, 2018
Party	Candidate	Votes	%
Democratic	Mary Freitas (incumbent)	1,437	30.2
Democratic	Mary Heath (incumbent)	1,379	29.0
Republican	Andreas Reif	992	20.8
Republican	Roland Six	952	20.0
Total votes		4,760	100.0
Democratic hold			
Democratic hold			

==== Hillsborough 15 ====
- Elects two representatives

Hillsborough District 15 general election, 2018
Party	Candidate	Votes	%
Democratic	Erika Conners (incumbent)	1,928	28.7
Republican	Mark Warden	1,795	26.7
Republican	Angel Brisson	1,513	22.5
Democratic	Ryan Curran	1,480	22.0
Total votes		6,716	100.0
Democratic hold			
Republican gain from Democratic			

==== Hillsborough 16 ====
- Elects two representatives

Democratic primary

Hillsborough District 16 Democratic primary
Party	Candidate	Votes	%
Democratic	Barbara Shaw (incumbent)	536	49.0
Democratic	Joshua Query	245	22.4
Democratic	Nickolas Levasseur	182	16.7
Democratic	Jason Lemay	130	11.9
Total votes		1,093	100.0

General election

Hillsborough District 16 general election, 2018
Party	Candidate	Votes	%
Democratic	Barbara Shaw (incumbent)	1,614	30.6
Democratic	Joshua Query	1,290	24.4
Republican	Victoria Sullivan (incumbent)	1,213	23.0
Republican	Thomas Robert	1,164	22.0
Total votes		5,281	100.0
Democratic hold			
Democratic gain from Republican			

==== Hillsborough 17 ====
- Elects two representatives

Hillsborough District 17 general election, 2018
Party	Candidate	Votes	%
Democratic	Heidi Hamer	1,569	29.1
Democratic	Timothy Smith (incumbent)	1,364	25.3
Republican	Tammy Simmons	1,234	22.9
Republican	Dan Garthwaite	1,164	21.6
Total votes		5,388	100.0
Democratic hold			
Democratic hold			

==== Hillsborough 18 ====
- Elects two representatives

Democratic primary

Hillsborough District 18 Democratic primary
Party	Candidate	Votes	%
Democratic	Patricia Cornell (incumbent)	397	51.2
Democratic	Willis Griffith	246	31.7
Democratic	Matthew Ping	133	17.1
Total votes		776	100.0

General election

Hillsborough District 18 general election, 2018
Party	Candidate	Votes	%
Democratic	Patricia Cornell (incumbent)	1,257	31.4
Democratic	Willis Griffith	1,116	27.9
Republican	Brittany Ping	819	20.4
Republican	Joshua Holmes	814	20.3
Total votes		4,006	100.0
Democratic hold			
Democratic hold			

==== Hillsborough 19 ====
- Elects two representatives

Hillsborough District 19 general election, 2018
Party	Candidate	Votes	%
Democratic	Bob Backus (incumbent)	1,721	28.6
Democratic	Kendall Snow	1,644	27.3
Republican	Patrick Sweeney	1,345	22.3
Republican	Dick Marston	1,309	21.7
Total votes		6,019	100.0
Democratic hold			
Democratic hold			

==== Hillsborough 20 ====
- Elects two representatives

Republican primary

Hillsborough District 20 Republican primary
Party	Candidate	Votes	%
Republican	Rich Lascelles (incumbent)	406	40.2
Republican	Ralph Boehm	375	37.1
Republican	Stephanie Lambert	230	22.7
Total votes		1,011	100.0

General election

Hillsborough District 20 general election, 2018
Party	Candidate	Votes	%
Republican	Rich Lascelles (incumbent)	2,088	31.3
Republican	Ralph Boehm	1,945	29.2
Democratic	Daniel Westervelt	1,419	21.3
Democratic	Geoffrey Westervelt	1,220	18.3
Total votes		6,672	100.0
Republican hold			
Republican hold			

==== Hillsborough 21 ====
- Elects eight representatives

Hillsborough District 21 general election, 2018
Party	Candidate	Votes	%
Republican	Bob L'Heureux (incumbent)	5,698	7.0
Democratic	Rosemarie Rung	5,440	6.7
Democratic	Nancy Murphy	5,414	6.6
Republican	Jeanine Notter (incumbent)	5,405	6.6
Republican	Dick Barry (incumbent)	5,327	6.5
Republican	Dick Hinch (incumbent)	5,304	6.5
Democratic	Wendy Thomas	5,294	6.5
Democratic	Kathryn Stack	5,110	6.3
Democratic	Brenda Grady	5,040	6.2
Republican	Lindsey Tausch	5,003	6.1
Republican	Jack Balcom	4,990	6.1
Democratic	Kim Kojak	4,817	5.9
Democratic	Chuck Mower	4,770	5.8
Republican	Keith Jeffrey	4,769	5.8
Republican	John Washburn	4,711	5.8
Democratic	Bryan Stisser	4,475	5.5
Total votes		81,567	100.0
Republican hold			
Democratic gain from Republican			
Democratic gain from Republican			
Republican hold			
Republican hold			
Republican hold			
Democratic gain from Republican			
Democratic gain from Republican			

==== Hillsborough 22 ====
- Elects three representatives

Hillsborough District 22 Democratic primary
Party	Candidate	Votes	%
Democratic	Megan Murray	1,030	36.6
Democratic	Julie Radhakrishnan	932	33.1
Democratic	Daniel Veilleux	851	30.3
Total votes		2,813	100.0

Republican primary

Hillsborough District 22 Republican primary
Party	Candidate	Votes	%
Republican	Peter Hansen (incumbent)	720	30.6
Republican	Reed Panasiti (Incumbent)	678	28.8
Republican	Scott Courtemanche	566	24.1
Republican	Jason Hennessey	387	16.5
Total votes		2,351	100.0

General election

Hillsborough District 22 general election, 2018
Party	Candidate	Votes	%
Democratic	Megan Murray	3,243	18.8
Democratic	Julie Radhakrishnan	2,999	17.4
Republican	Reed Panasiti (Incumbent)	2,872	16.7
Democratic	Daniel Veilleux	2,859	16.6
Republican	Peter Hansen (incumbent)	2,726	15.8
Republican	Scott Courtemanche	2,521	14.6
Total votes		17,220	100.0
Democratic hold			
Democratic gain from Republican			
Republican hold			

==== Hillsborough 23 ====
- Elects four representatives

Hillsborough District 23 general election, 2018
Party	Candidate	Votes	%
Democratic	Joelle Martin (incumbent)	3,310	14.5
Democratic	Paul Dargie	3,110	13.7
Democratic	Peter Petrigno	3,106	13.6
Republican	Charlie Burns (incumbent)	2,745	12.1
Democratic	John Frazier	2,721	11.9
Republican	Carolyn Halstead (incumbent)	2,655	11.7
Republican	Michael Thornton	2,558	11.2
Republican	John Yule	2,551	11.2
Total votes		22,756	100.0
Democratic hold			
Democratic gain from Republican			
Democratic gain from Republican			
Republican hold			

==== Hillsborough 24 ====
- Elects two representatives

Democratic primary

Hillsborough District 24 Democratic primary
Party	Candidate	Votes	%
Democratic	Peter Leishman (incumbent)	782	34.8
Democratic	Ivy Vann (incumbent)	780	34.7
Democratic	Adam Hamilton	683	30.4
Total votes		2,245	100.0

General election

Hillsborough District 24 general election, 2018
Party	Candidate	Votes	%
Democratic	Peter Leishman (incumbent)	2,232	49.5
Democratic	Ivy Vann (incumbent)	2,232	49.5
Total votes		4,513	100.0
Democratic hold			
Democratic hold			

==== Hillsborough 25 ====
- Elects two representatives

Hillsborough District 25 general election, 2018
Party	Candidate	Votes	%
Republican	Paul Somero (incumbent)	1,906	31.8
Republican	Tim Merlino	1,850	30.9
Democratic	Laura Lynch	1,128	18.8
Democratic	Lisa Beaudoin	1,106	18.5
Total votes		5,990	100.0
Republican hold			
Republican hold			

==== Hillsborough 26 ====
- Elects two representatives

Hillsborough District 27 general election, 2018
Party	Candidate	Votes	%
Republican	Jack Flanagan	1,615	26.3
Democratic	Brett Hall	1,546	25.2
Republican	John Lewicke (incumbent)	1,540	25.1
Democratic	Brian Rater	1,441	23.5
Total votes		6,142	100.0
Republican hold			
Democratic gain from Republican			

==== Hillsborough 27 ====
- Elects two representatives

Republican primary

Hillsborough District 26 Republican primary
Party	Candidate	Votes	%
Republican	James Kelly	539	35.4
Republican	James Belanger (incumbent)	452	29.7
Republican	Donna Levasseur	305	20.0
Republican	Carolyn Gargasz (incumbent)	226	14.8
Total votes		1,522	100.0

General election

Hillsborough District 26 general election, 2018
Party	Candidate	Votes	%
Democratic	Michelle St. John	2,147	26.8
Republican	James Belanger (incumbent)	2,075	25.9
Republican	Jim Kelly	1,924	24.0
Democratic	Tom Harris	1,863	23.3
Total votes		8,009	100.0
Democratic gain from Republican			
Republican hold			

==== Hillsborough 28 ====
- Elects three representatives

Hillsborough District 28 general election, 2018
Party	Candidate	Votes	%
Democratic	Jan Schmidt (incumbent)	2,275	18.8
Democratic	William Bordy	2,109	17.5
Democratic	Bruce Cohen	2,045	16.9
Republican	Tom Lanzara	1,923	15.9
Republican	Elizabeth Ferreira (incumbent)	1,915	15.9
Republican	Carl Seidel (incumbent)	1,804	14.9
Total votes		12,071	100.0
Democratic hold			
Democratic gain from Republican			
Democratic gain from Republican			

==== Hillsborough 29 ====
- Elects three representatives

Democratic primary

Hillsborough District 29 Democratic primary
Party	Candidate	Votes	%
Democratic	Sue Newman (incumbent)	605	34.9
Democratic	Paul Bergeron	397	22.9
Democratic	Ray Newman	380	21.9
Democratic	Jordan Thompson	350	20.2
Total votes		1,732	100.0

General election

Hillsborough District 29 general election, 2018
Party	Candidate	Votes	%
Democratic	Paul Bergeron	3,015	32.1
Democratic	Sue Newman (incumbent)	1,920	20.4
Democratic	Ray Newman	1,768	18.8
Republican	Michael McCarthy	1,394	14.8
Republican	Michael Balboni	1,292	13.8
Total votes		9,389	100.0
Democratic hold			
Democratic hold			
Democratic gain from Republican			

==== Hillsborough 30 ====
- Elects three representatives

Hillsborough District 30 general election, 2018
Party	Candidate	Votes	%
Democratic	Patricia Klee (incumbent)	1,935	21.0
Democratic	Sherry Dutzy	1,853	20.2
Democratic	Suzanne Vail	1,837	20.0
Republican	Lisa Scontsas	1,298	14.1
Republican	Mariellen MacKay (incumbent)	1,160	12.6
Republican	Doris Hohensee	1,112	12.1
Total votes		9,195	100.0
Democratic hold			
Democratic hold			
Democratic gain from Republican			

==== Hillsborough 31 ====
- Elects three representatives

Hillsborough District 31 general election, 2018
Party	Candidate	Votes	%
Democratic	David Cote (incumbent)	1,329	35.5
Democratic	Manny Espitia (incumbent)	1,221	32.6
Democratic	Fred Davis	1,160	31.0
Total votes		3,746	100.0
Democratic hold			
Democratic hold			
Democratic hold			

==== Hillsborough 32 ====
- Elects three representatives

Democratic primary

Hillsborough District 32 Democratic primary
Party	Candidate	Votes	%
Democratic	Allison Nutting-Wong (Note: Rep. Nutting-Wong previously represented the Hillsborough 34 district in the 165th General Court before resigning May 24, 2018, because she had moved out of the district.)	532	29.0
Democratic	Dan Toomey	508	27.7
Democratic	Michael Pedersen	442	24.1
Democratic	Josh Mercer	353	19.2
Total votes		1,835	100.0

General election

Hillsborough District 32 general election, 2018
Party	Candidate	Votes	%
Democratic	Dan Toomey	2,197	19.1
Democratic	Allison Nutting-Wong	2,120	18.4
Democratic	Michael Pedersen	2,075	18.0
Republican	Paula Johnson	1,828	15.9
Republican	Frank Moore	1,691	14.7
Republican	Di Lathrop	1,620	14.0
Total votes		11,531	100.0
Democratic gain from Republican			
Democratic gain from Republican			
Democratic gain from Republican			

==== Hillsborough 33 ====
- Elects three representatives

Hillsborough District 33 general election, 2018
Party	Candidate	Votes	%
Democratic	Ken N. Gidge (incumbent)	1,621	28.7
Democratic	Mark King (incumbent)	1,443	25.5
Democratic	Fran Nutter-Upham	1,390	24.6
Republican	Kevin Scully (incumbent)	1,195	21.2
Total votes		5,649	100.0
Democratic hold			
Democratic hold			
Democratic gain from Republican			

==== Hillsborough 34 ====
- Elects three representatives

Hillsborough District 34 general election, 2018
Party	Candidate	Votes	%
Democratic	Deb Stevens	1,446	22.4
Democratic	Catherine Sofikitis (incumbent)	1,424	22.0
Democratic	Greg Indruk	1,365	21.1
Republican	Dee Hogan	1,149	17.8
Republican	Donald Whalen	1,085	16.8
Total votes		6,469	100.0
Democratic hold			
Democratic hold			
Democratic gain from Republican			

==== Hillsborough 35 ====
- Elects three representatives

Hillsborough District 35 general election, 2018
Party	Candidate	Votes	%
Democratic	Laura Telerski	2,201	21.5
Democratic	Latha Mangipudi (incumbent)	2,172	21.3
Democratic	Skip Cleaver (incumbent)	2,018	19.8
Republican	Peter Silva	1,387	13.6
Republican	Paul Hutsteiner	1,221	12.0
Republican	Michael Mader	1,215	11.9
Total votes		10,214	100.0
Democratic hold			
Democratic hold			
Democratic hold			

==== Hillsborough 36 ====
- Elects three representatives

Hillsborough District 36 general election, 2018
Party	Candidate	Votes	%
Democratic	Michael O'Brien (incumbent)	2,094	19.9
Democratic	Linda Harriott-Gathright	2,070	19.6
Democratic	Marty Jack (incumbent)	2,032	19.3
Republican	Bill Ohm (incumbent)	1,592	15.1
Republican	Paula Moran	1,466	13.9
Republican	Iang Jeon	1,288	12.2
Total votes		10,542	100.0
Democratic hold			
Democratic hold			
Democratic gain from Republican			

==== Hillsborough 37 ====
- Elects eleven representatives

Hillsborough District 37 general election, 2018
Party	Candidate	Votes	%
Republican	Lynne Ober (incumbent)	7,827	5.8
Republican	Kim Rice (incumbent)	7,553	5.6
Republican	Russell Ober (incumbent)	7,500	5.5
Republican	Andrew Renzullo (incumbent)	7,224	5.3
Republican	Bob Greene	7,148	5.3
Republican	Alicia Lekas	7,101	5.2
Republican	Jordan Ulery (incumbent)	7,057	5.2
Republican	James Whittemore	6,957	5.1
Republican	Andrew Prout (incumbent)	6,819	5.0
Republican	Tony Lekas	6,812	5.0
Republican	Hershel Nunez	6,722	4.9
Democratic	Grace Kennedy	5,261	3.9
Democratic	Paul Moriarty	5,209	3.8
Democratic	Barbara Blue	5,203	3.8
Democratic	Krysten Evans	5,162	3.8
Democratic	Nancy Brucker	5,100	3.8
Democratic	David Hennessey	5,004	3.7
Democratic	Robert Sherman	4,967	3.7
Democratic	Hal Lynde	4,959	3.6
Democratic	Lana Paliy	4,882	3.6
Democratic	Alejandro Urrutia	4,832	3.6
Democratic	Michael Drouin	4,722	3.5
Libertarian	Caleb Q. Dyer (incumbent) (Note: Originally elected in 2016 as a Republican.)	1,113	0.8
Libertarian	Louis Alciere	758	0.6
Total votes		135,892	100.0
Republican hold			
Republican hold			
Republican hold			
Republican hold			
Republican hold			
Republican hold			
Republican hold			
Republican hold			
Republican hold			
Republican hold			
Republican gain from Libertarian			

==== Hillsborough 38 ====
- Elects two representatives

Hillsborough District 38 general election, 2018
Party	Candidate	Votes	%
Democratic	Chris Balch	4,970	26.7
Democratic	James Bosman	4,784	25.7
Republican	David Bedard	4,518	24.3
Republican	John Valera (incumbent)	4,341	23.3
Total votes		18,613	100.0
Democratic hold			
Democratic gain from Republican			

==== Hillsborough 39 ====
- Elects one representative

Hillsborough District 39 general election, 2018
Party	Candidate	Votes	%
Republican	John Burt (incumbent)	6,104	54.4
Democratic	Gary Evans	5,120	45.6
Total votes		11,224	100.0
Republican hold			

==== Hillsborough 40 ====
- Elects one representative

Hillsborough District 40 general election, 2018
Party	Candidate	Votes	%
Democratic	Kat McGhee	7,403	50.9
Republican	Keith Ammon (incumbent)	6,783	46.7
Libertarian	Mark Linn	348	2.4
Total votes		14,534	100.0
Democratic gain from Republican			

==== Hillsborough 41 ====
- Elects one representative

Hillsborough District 41 general election, 2018
Party	Candidate	Votes	%
Republican	Laurie Sanborn (incumbent)	8,405	50.4
Democratic	Lisa Nash	8,276	49.6
Total votes		16,692	100.0
Republican hold			

==== Hillsborough 42 ====
- Elects two representatives

Democratic primary

Hillsborough District 42 Democratic primary
Party	Candidate	Votes	%
Democratic	Jacqueline Chretien	2,167	47.7
Democratic	Matt Wilhelm	1,434	31.6
Democratic	Jesse Martineau (incumbent)	940	20.7
Total votes		4,541	100.0

General election

Hillsborough District 42 general election, 2018
Party	Candidate	Votes	%
Democratic	Jacqueline Chretien	5,862	32.1
Democratic	Matt Wilhelm	5,180	28.3
Republican	Joseph Lachance	3,771	20.6
Republican	Phillip Harris	3,468	19.0
Total votes		18,281	100.0
Democratic hold			
Democratic hold			

==== Hillsborough 43 ====
- Elects three representatives

Hillsborough District 43 general election, 2018
Party	Candidate	Votes	%
Democratic	Chris Herbert (incumbent)	5,396	29.5
Democratic	Benjamin Baroody (incumbent)	5,136	28.1
Democratic	Richard Komi	4,508	24.7
Republican	Ross Terrio	3,863	21.1
Republican	Michael Garcia	3,834	21.0
Republican	Jason Hodgdon	3,767	20.6
Total votes		26,504	100.0
Democratic hold			
Democratic hold			
Democratic gain from Republican			

==== Hillsborough 44 ====
- Elects two representatives

Republican primary

Hillsborough District 44 Republican primary
Party	Candidate	Votes	%
Republican	Mark McLean (incumbent)	960	36.3
Republican	Mark Proulx (incumbent)	949	35.9
Republican	Rhonda Lambert	737	27.9
Total votes		2,646	100.0

General election

Hillsborough District 44 general election, 2018
Party	Candidate	Votes	%
Republican	Mark Proulx (incumbent)	4,812	26.3
Republican	Mark McLean (incumbent)	4,736	25.9
Democratic	Heather Ledoux	4,528	24.7
Democratic	Candace Moulton	4,223	23.1
Total votes		18,309	100.0
Republican hold			
Republican hold			

==== Hillsborough 45 ====
- Elects two representatives

Democratic primary

Hillsborough District 45 Democratic primary
Party	Candidate	Votes	%
Democratic	Jane Beaulieu (incumbent)	1,299	44.4
Democratic	Connie Van Houten (incumbent)	1,245	42.6
Democratic	Chloe Sowers	377	12.9
Total votes		2,921	100.0

General election

Hillsborough District 45 general election, 2018
Party	Candidate	Votes	%
Democratic	Jane Beaulieu (incumbent)	4,432	29.2
Democratic	Connie Van Houten (incumbent)	4,153	27.3
Republican	Carlos Gonzalez	3,260	21.4
Republican	Scott Eich	2,930	19.3
Libertarian	Alex Avery	425	2.8
Total votes		15,200	100.0
Democratic hold			
Democratic hold			

=== Merrimack County ===
==== Merrimack 1 ====
- Elects one representative

Merrimack District 1 general election, 2018
Party	Candidate	Votes	%
Democratic	Ken Wells	1,128	50.9
Republican	Louise Andrus	1,086	49.1
Total votes		2,214	100.0
Democratic gain from Republican			

==== Merrimack 2 ====
- Elects two representatives

Merrimack District 2 general election, 2018
Party	Candidate	Votes	%
Republican	Dave Testerman (incumbent)	1,218	31.2
Republican	Werner D. Horn (incumbent)	996	25.5
Democratic	Scott Burns	946	24.2
Democratic	Delaney Carrier	750	19.2
Total votes		3,910	100.0
Republican hold			
Republican hold			

==== Merrimack 3 ====
- Elects two representatives

Merrimack District 3 general election, 2018
Party	Candidate	Votes	%
Republican	Greg Hill (incumbent)	1,408	27.7
Democratic	Joyce Fulweiler	1,295	25.5
Republican	Kathy Lauer-Rago	1,277	25.1
Democratic	Jim Lintner	1,108	21.8
Total votes		5,088	100.0
Republican hold			
Democratic gain from Republican			

==== Merrimack 4 ====
- Elects one representative

Merrimack District 4 general election, 2018
Party	Candidate	Votes	%
Democratic	Tom Schamberg	938	53.7
Republican	Douglas Long (incumbent)	810	46.3
Total votes		1,748	100.0
Democratic gain from Republican			

==== Merrimack 5 ====
- Elects two representatives

Merrimack District 5 general election, 2018
Party	Candidate	Votes	%
Democratic	Karen Ebel (incumbent)	2,250	39.2
Republican	Dan Wolf (incumbent)	2,012	35.1
Democratic	Andy Schmidt	1,478	25.7
Total votes		5,740	100.0
Democratic hold			
Republican hold			

==== Merrimack 6 ====
- Elects two representatives

Merrimack District 6 general election, 2018
Party	Candidate	Votes	%
Democratic	Beth Rodd (incumbent)	1,570	30.4
Democratic	Rod Pimentel	1,516	29.4
Republican	Mark Lindsley	1,111	21.5
Republican	Thomas Dunne	967	18.7
Total votes		5,164	100.0
Democratic hold			
Democratic hold			

==== Merrimack 7 ====
- Elects one representative

Merrimack District 7 general election, 2018
Party	Candidate	Votes	%
Democratic	Clyde Carson (incumbent)	1,265	54.6
Republican	Terry Cox	1,052	45.4
Total votes		2,317	100.0
Democratic hold			

==== Merrimack 8 ====
- Elects one representative

Republican primary

Merrimack District 8 general election, 2018
Party	Candidate	Votes	%
Republican	Robert Forsythe	135	51.7
Republican	Tim Vendt	126	48.3
Total votes		261	100.0

General election

Merrimack District 8 general election, 2018
Party	Candidate	Votes	%
Republican	Robert Forsythe	632	50.1
Democratic	Edward Cherian	626	49.6
Total votes		1,261	100.0
Republican gain from Democratic			

==== Merrimack 9 ====
- Elects two representatives

Merrimack District 9 general election, 2018
Party	Candidate	Votes	%
Democratic	Howard Moffett (incumbent)	1,991	27.4
Democratic	George Saunderson	1,874	25.8
Republican	Michael Moffett (incumbent)	1,819	25.1
Republican	Jose Cambrils	1,573	21.7
Total votes		7,257	100.0
Democratic hold			
Democratic gain from Republican			

==== Merrimack 10 ====
- Elects three representatives

Democratic primary

Merrimack District 10 Democratic primary
Party	Candidate	Votes	%
Democratic	Mary Jane Wallner (incumbent)	1,587	31.0
Democratic	David Luneau (incumbent)	1,455	24.5
Democratic	Mel Myner (incumbent)	1,327	26.0
Democratic	Mary Kusturin	527	10.3
Democratic	Joel Prescott	167	3.3
Total votes		5,113	100.0

General election

Merrimack District 10 general election, 2018
Party	Candidate	Votes	%
Democratic	Mary Jane Wallner (incumbent)	3,625	26.7
Democratic	David Luneau (incumbent)	3,624	26.7
Democratic	Mel Myner (incumbent)	3,490	25.7
Republican	John French	1,736	12.8
Republican	Luke Diamond	1,100	8.1
Total votes		13,575	100.0
Democratic hold			
Democratic hold			
Democratic hold			

==== Merrimack 11 ====
- Elects one representative

Merrimack District 11 general election, 2018
Party	Candidate	Votes	%
Democratic	Steve Shurtleff (incumbent)	1,152	64.7
Republican	Kevin Miller	629	35.3
Total votes		1,781	100.0
Democratic hold			

==== Merrimack 12 ====
- Elects one representative

Merrimack District 12 general election, 2018
Party	Candidate	Votes	%
Democratic	Connie Lane	1,031	98.6
Total votes		1,046	100.0
Democratic hold			

==== Merrimack 13 ====
- Elects one representative

Merrimack District 13 general election, 2018
Party	Candidate	Votes	%
Democratic	Beth Richards (incumbent)	940	99.3
Total votes		947	100.0
Democratic hold			

==== Merrimack 14 ====
- Elects one representative

Democratic primary

Merrimack District 14 Democratic primary
Party	Candidate	Votes	%
Democratic	Jim MacKay (incumbent)	396	85.5
Democratic	Roy Schweiker	67	14.5
Total votes		463	100.0

General election

Merrimack District 14 general election, 2018
Party	Candidate	Votes	%
Democratic	Jim MacKay (incumbent)	1,194	74.8
Republican	Mike Visconti	403	25.2
Total votes		1,597	100.0
Democratic hold			

==== Merrimack 15 ====
- Elects one representative

Merrimack District 15 general election, 2018
Party	Candidate	Votes	%
Democratic	Ryan Buchanan	1,033	99.6
Total votes		1,037	100.0
Democratic hold			

==== Merrimack 16 ====
- Elects one representative

Merrimack District 16 general election, 2018
Party	Candidate	Votes	%
Democratic	Timothy Soucy (incumbent)	1,486	71.1
Republican	Bob Bertrand	604	28.9
Total votes		2,090	100.0
Democratic hold			

==== Merrimack 17 ====
- Elects one representative

Democratic primary

Merrimack District 17 Democratic primary
Party	Candidate	Votes	%
Democratic	Safiya Wazir	329	69.7
Democratic	Dick Patten (incumbent)	143	30.3
Total votes		472	100.0

General election

Merrimack District 17 general election, 2018
Party	Candidate	Votes	%
Democratic	Safiya Wazir	906	55.8
Republican	Dennis Soucy	718	44.2
Total votes		1,624	100.0
Democratic hold			

==== Merrimack 18 ====
- Elects one representative

Merrimack District 18 general election, 2018
Party	Candidate	Votes	%
Democratic	Kris Schultz (incumbent)	877	62.2
Republican	Mary Donnelly	532	37.8
Total votes		1,409	100.0
Democratic hold			

==== Merrimack 19 ====
- Elects one representative

Merrimack District 19 general election, 2018
Party	Candidate	Votes	%
Democratic	Christy Bartlett (incumbent)	1,386	58.0
Republican	Todd Haywood	1,003	42.0
Total votes		2,389	100.0
Democratic hold			

==== Merrimack 20 ====
- Elects three representatives

Merrimack District 20 general election, 2018
Party	Candidate	Votes	%
Democratic	Dianne Schuett (incumbent)	2,015	17.9
Democratic	David Doherty (incumbent)	1,976	17.6
Republican	Brian Seaworth (incumbent)	1,956	17.4
Republican	Richard Bilodeau	1,827	16.3
Democratic	Clinton Hanson	1,784	15.9
Republican	Peter Gagyi	1,673	14.9
Total votes		11,231	100.0
Democratic hold			
Democratic hold			
Republican hold			

==== Merrimack 21 ====
- Elects two representatives

Republican primary

Merrimack District 21 Republican primary
Party	Candidate	Votes	%
Republican	James Allard	433	40.3
Republican	John Klose (incumbent)	355	33.1
Republican	Michael Brewster (incumbent)	286	26.6
Total votes		1,074	100.0

General election

Merrimack District 21 general election, 2018
Party	Candidate	Votes	%
Republican	James Allard	1,775	29.5
Republican	John Klose (incumbent)	1,638	27.3
Democratic	Miriam Cahill-Yeaton	1,405	23.8
Democratic	Mary Frambach	1,190	19.8
Total votes		6,008	100.0
Republican hold			
Republican hold			

==== Merrimack 22 ====
- Elects one representative

Democratic primary

Merrimack District 22 Democratic primary
Party	Candidate	Votes	%
Democratic	Adam Turcotte (incumbent)	172	59.5
Democratic	Dawna Baxter	117	40.5
Total votes		289	100.0

Republican primary

Merrimack District 22 Republican primary
Party	Candidate	Votes	%
Republican	Scott McDonald	119	41.8
Republican	Jason Tardiff	112	39.3
Republican	Matthew Pitaro	54	18.9
Total votes		285	100.0

General election

Merrimack District 22 general election, 2018
Party	Candidate	Votes	%
Democratic	Adam Turcotte (incumbent)	829	53.6
Republican	Scott McDonald	718	46.4
Total votes		1,547	100.0
Democratic hold			

==== Merrimack 23 ====
- Elects three representatives

Democratic primary

Merrimack District 23 Democratic primary
Party	Candidate	Votes	%
Democratic	Mary Beth Walz (incumbent)	1,169	34.2
Democratic	Samantha Fox	985	28.8
Democratic	Gary Woods	941	27.5
Democratic	Bill Knapp	327	9.6
Total votes		3,422	100.0

Republican primary

Merrimack District 23 Republican primary
Party	Candidate	Votes	%
Republican	Richard Johnson	776	30.6
Republican	John Martin	664	26.2
Republican	Paul Brassard*	366	14.4
Republican	Christopher Fox*	366	14.4
Republican	Philip Kwiatkowski	363	14.3
Total votes		2,535	100.0

- *Brassard won a tie-breaker.

General election

Merrimack District 23 general election, 2018
Party	Candidate	Votes	%
Democratic	Mary Beth Walz (incumbent)	2,997	18.7
Democratic	Gary Woods	2,945	18.4
Democratic	Samantha Fox	2,812	17.6
Republican	Richard Johnson	2,559	16.0
Republican	John Martin	2,346	14.7
Republican	Paul Brassard	2,342	14.6
Total votes		16,001	100.0
Democratic hold			
Democratic gain from Republican			
Democratic gain from Republican			

==== Merrimack 24 ====
- Elects four representatives

Republican primary

Merrimack District 24 Republican primary
Party	Candidate	Votes	%
Republican	Michael Yakubovich	728	19.9
Republican	Frank Kotowski (incumbent)	710	19.4
Republican	Thomas Walsh (incumbent)	650	17.8
Republican	Dick Marple (incumbent)	621	17.0
Republican	John Leavitt (incumbent)	504	13.8
Republican	William Nickerson	287	7.8
Republican	Allan Whatley	159	4.3
Total votes		3,659	100.0

General election

Merrimack District 24 general election, 2018
Party	Candidate	Votes	%
Republican	Thomas Walsh (incumbent)	2,998	14.2
Republican	Frank Kotowski (incumbent)	2,904	13.8
Republican	Michael Yakubovich	2,839	13.5
Republican	Dick Marple (incumbent)	2,644	12.5
Democratic	Kathleen Martins	2,531	12.0
Democratic	Harry Kozlowski	2,479	11.8
Democratic	Marcy Rothenberg	2,404	11.4
Democratic	Madalasa Gurung	2,295	10.9
Total votes		21,094	100.0
Republican hold			
Republican hold			
Republican hold			
Republican hold			

==== Merrimack 25 ====
- Elects one representative

Democratic primary

Merrimack District 25 Democratic primary
Party	Candidate	Votes	%
Democratic	David Karrick	653	54.8
Democratic	Bianca Peco	539	45.2
Total votes		1,192	100.0

General election

Merrimack District 25 general election, 2018
Party	Candidate	Votes	%
Democratic	David Karrick	2,327	51.5
Republican	Natalie Wells (incumbent)	2,195	48.5
Total votes		4,522	100.0
Democratic gain from Republican			

==== Merrimack 26 ====
- Elects one representative

Merrimack District 26 general election, 2018
Party	Candidate	Votes	%
Republican	Howard Pearl (incumbent)	4,071	51.5
Democratic	Lorrie Carey	3,830	48.5
Total votes		7,901	100.0
Republican hold			

==== Merrimack 27 ====
- Elects two representatives

Democratic primary

Merrimack District 27 Democratic primary
Party	Candidate	Votes	%
Democratic	Rebecca McWilliams	2,135	46.2
Democratic	Art Ellison	1,280	27.7
Democratic	Carl Soderstrom	796	17.2
Democratic	Eric Gallagher	409	8.9
Total votes		4,620	100.0

General election

Merrimack District 27 general election, 2018
Party	Candidate	Votes	%
Democratic	Rebecca McWilliams	6,419	52.5
Democratic	Art Ellison	5,798	47.4
Total votes		12,288	100.0
Democratic hold			
Democratic hold			

==== Merrimack 28 ====
- Elects one representative

Merrimack District 28 general election, 2018
Party	Candidate	Votes	%
Democratic	Katherine Rogers (incumbent)	3,128	57.9
Republican	Andrew Georgevits	2,273	42.1
Total votes		5,401	100.0
Democratic hold			

==== Merrimack 29 ====
- Elects one representative

Merrimack District 29 general election, 2018
Party	Candidate	Votes	%
Republican	Carol McGuire (incumbent)	2,795	57.8
Democratic	Erin Canterbury	2,037	42.2
Total votes		4,832	100.0
Republican hold			

=== Rockingham County ===
==== Rockingham 1 ====
- Elects one representative

Republican primary

Rockingham District 1 Republican primary
Party	Candidate	Votes	%
Republican	Joseph McCaffery	228	61.8
Republican	Brian Stone (incumbent)	141	38.2
Total votes		369	100.0

General election

Rockingham District 1 general election, 2018
Party	Candidate	Votes	%
Democratic	David Coursin	1,005	50.4
Republican	Joseph McCaffery	988	49.6
Total votes		1,993	100.0
Democratic gain from Republican			

==== Rockingham 2 ====
- Elects three representatives

Republican primary

Rockingham District 2 Republican primary
Party	Candidate	Votes	%
Republican	James Spillane (incumbent)	1,006	26.8
Republican	Kevin Verville (incumbent)	912	24.3
Republican	Alan Bershtein	905	24.1
Republican	Andrew Robertson	473	12.6
Republican	Katrina Langlois	455	12.1
Total votes		3,751	100.0

General election

Rockingham District 2 general election, 2018
Party	Candidate	Votes	%
Republican	James Spillane (incumbent)	3,284	18.4
Republican	Alan Bershtein	3,209	17.9
Republican	Kevin Verville (incumbent)	3,130	17.5
Democratic	Gwen Friend	3,001	16.8
Democratic	Rebecca Hutchinson	2,987	16.7
Democratic	Lloyd Carr	2,267	12.7
Total votes		17,878	100.0
Republican hold			
Republican hold			
Republican hold			

==== Rockingham 3 ====
- Elects three representatives

Rockingham District 3 general election, 2018
Party	Candidate	Votes	%
Republican	Kevin Pratt	2,250	22.4
Republican	Kathleen Hoelzel (incumbent)	1,973	19.6
Republican	Michael Costable (incumbent)	1,903	18.9
Democratic	Jennifer Dube	1,347	13.4
Democratic	Michelle Couture	1,347	13.4
Democratic	Deborah Nelson	1,228	12.2
Total votes		10,048	100.0
Republican hold			
Republican hold			
Republican hold			

==== Rockingham 4 ====
- Elects five representatives

Republican primary

Rockingham District 4 Republican primary
Party	Candidate	Votes	%
Republican	Chris True (incumbent)	1,348	19.6
Republican	Jess Edwards (incumbent)	1,249	18.1
Republican	Jason Osborne (incumbent)	1,198	17.4
Republican	Becky Owens	937	13.6
Republican	Tony Piemonte	910	13.2
Republican	James Devine	683	9.9
Republican	David Smiley	564	8.2
Total votes		6,889	100.0

Democratic primary

Rockingham District 4 Democratic primary
Party	Candidate	Votes	%
Democratic	Cynthia Herman	892	21.7
Democratic	Patrick McLaughlin	724	17.6
Democratic	Todd Bedard	686	16.7
Democratic	Benjamin Geiger	610	14.8
Democratic	Stephen D'Angelo	601	14.6
Democratic	Russell Norman	596	14.5
Total votes		4,109	100.0

General election

Rockingham District 4 general election, 2018
Party	Candidate	Votes	%
Republican	Chris True (incumbent)	4,416	12.6
Republican	Jess Edwards (incumbent)	4,371	12.5
Republican	Becky Owens	4,236	12.1
Republican	Jason Osborne (incumbent)	4,093	11.7
Republican	Tony Piemonte	3,948	11.3
Democratic	Cynthia Herman	2,934	8.4
Democratic	Todd Bedard	2,834	8.1
Democratic	Patrick McLaughlin	2,784	8.0
Democratic	Stephen D'Angelo	2,698	7.7
Democratic	Benjamin Geiger	2,622	7.5
Total votes		34,936	100.0
Republican hold			
Republican hold			
Republican hold			
Republican hold			
Republican gain from Democratic			

==== Rockingham 5 ====
- Elects seven representatives

Rockingham District 5 general election, 2018
Party	Candidate	Votes	%
Republican	David Lundgren (incumbent)	5,451	8.9
Republican	Betsy McKinney (incumbent)	5,241	8.6
Republican	Tom Dolan	5,187	8.5
Republican	Al Baldasaro (incumbent)	5,110	8.4
Republican	Sherman Packard (incumbent)	4,903	8.0
Republican	Doug Thomas (incumbent)	4,743	7.8
Democratic	Anne Warner	4,619	7.5
Republican	Roger Fillio	4,572	7.5
Democratic	Robin Skudlarek	4,484	7.3
Democratic	Luisa Piette	4,370	7.1
Democratic	Martha Smith	4,330	7.1
Democratic	Paul Skudlarek	4,288	7.0
Democratic	Mack Leathurby	4,137	6.8
Democratic	Kyle Foden	4,076	6.7
Total votes		61,181	100.0
Republican hold			
Republican hold			
Republican hold			
Republican hold			
Republican hold			
Republican hold			
Democratic gain from Republican			

==== Rockingham 6 ====
- Elects ten representatives

Republican primary

Rockingham District 6 Republican primary
Party	Candidate	Votes	%
Republican	David Love	1,126	8.5
Republican	Phyllis Katsakiores (incumbent)	1,023	7.7
Republican	John Potucek	994	7.5
Republican	Brian Chirichiello (incumbent)	939	7.1
Republican	John O'Connor (incumbent)	926	7.0
Republican	Dave Milz (incumbent)	905	6.8
Republican	James C. Webb (incumbent)	893	6.7
Republican	Katherine O'Brien	890	6.7
Republican	Frank Sapatero (incumbent)	851	6.4
Republican	Stephen Pearson	836	6.3
Republican	Brenda Willis (incumbent)	822	6.2
Republican	Patricia Dowling (incumbent)	764	5.7
Republican	Richard Tripp (incumbent)	711	5.4
Republican	Kevin Reichard	572	4.3
Republican	Thomas Cardon	537	4.0
Republican	Daniel Healey	490	3.7
Total votes		13,279	100.0

General election

Rockingham District 6 general election, 2018
Party	Candidate	Votes	%
Republican	Phyllis Katsakiores (incumbent)	5,648	7.0
Republican	David Love	5,209	6.4
Republican	Brian Chirichiello (incumbent)	5,078	6.2
Republican	John O'Connor (incumbent)	5,018	6.2
Democratic	Mary Eisner	4,986	6.1
Republican	Katherine O'Brien	4,985	6.1
Republican	James C. Webb (incumbent)	4,976	6.1
Republican	Dave Milz (incumbent)	4,883	6.0
Republican	John Potucek	4,648	5.7
Republican	Stephen Pearson	4,587	5.6
Democratic	Michelle Sawyer-Moge	4,551	5.6
Democratic	Paul Doolittle	4,395	5.4
Democratic	Sean Cohen	4,245	5.2
Republican	Frank Sapatero (incumbent)	4,211	5.2
Democratic	Ronald Cooper	4,095	5.0
Democratic	Fred Bates	4,095	5.0
Democratic	Owen Ingram	4,086	5.0
Libertarian	Anne Copp	1,595	2.0
Total votes		81,251	100.0
Republican hold			
Republican hold			
Republican hold			
Republican hold			
Democratic gain from Republican			
Republican hold			
Republican hold			
Republican hold			
Republican hold			
Republican hold			

==== Rockingham 7 ====
- Elects four representatives

Republican primary

Rockingham District 7 Republican primary
Party	Candidate	Votes	%
Republican	Mary Griffin (incumbent)	735	19.7
Republican	Walter Kolodziej (incumbent)	652	17.4
Republican	Charles McMahon (incumbent)	646	17.3
Republican	Joel Desilets	535	14.3
Republican	Julius Soti	420	11.2
Republican	Tommy Sharp	334	8.9
Republican	Kevin Liddell	274	7.3
Republican	Kevin Reichard	141	3.8
Total votes		3,737	100.0

General election

Rockingham District 7 general election, 2018
Party	Candidate	Votes	%
Republican	Mary Griffin (incumbent)	3,718	15.5
Republican	Charles McMahon (incumbent)	3,665	15.3
Republican	Joel Desilets	3,329	13.9
Republican	Walter Kolodziej (incumbent)	3,318	13.9
Democratic	Kristi St. Laurent	3,147	13.1
Democratic	Stephen Mavrellis	2,333	9.7
Democratic	Marie Yanish	2,283	9.5
Democratic	Ioana Singureanu	2,151	9.0
Total votes		23,944	100.0
Republican hold			
Republican hold			
Republican hold			
Republican hold			

==== Rockingham 8 ====
- Elects nine representatives

Republican primary

Rockingham District 8 Republican primary
Party	Candidate	Votes	%
Republican	John Sytek (incumbent)	1,244	9.6
Republican	Fred Doucette (incumbent)	1,150	8.9
Republican	Arthur Barnes (incumbent)	1,104	8.6
Republican	Everett McBride	1,089	8.4
Republican	Bob Elliott (incumbent)	1,059	8.1
Republican	Betty Gay (incumbent)	1,046	8.1
Republican	Daryl Abbas	1,032	8.0
Republican	John Janigian (incumbent)	1,025	7.9
Republican	Ed DeClercq	870	6.7
Republican	Patrick Bick	692	5.4
Republican	David Bruce	688	5.3
Republican	Luke Mroz	677	5.2
Republican	John Manning (incumbent)	672	5.2
Republican	Patrick McDougall	554	4.3
Total votes		12,902	100.0

Democratic primary

Rockingham District 8 Democratic primary
Party	Candidate	Votes	%
Democratic	Kelly Moss	1,012	12.7
Democratic	Bonnie Wright	1,008	12.7
Democratic	Janet Breslin	946	11.9
Democratic	Jacqueline Muollo	862	10.8
Democratic	Cam Iannalfo	760	9.6
Democratic	Gregory Davis	744	9.4
Democratic	Sean Lewis	729	9.2
Democratic	David Hickernell	668	8.4
Democratic	George Perry	661	8.3
Democratic	Scott Abercrombie	564	7.1
Total votes		7,954	100.0

General election

Rockingham District 8 general election, 2018
Party	Candidate	Votes	%
Republican	John Sytek (incumbent)	5,780	6.8
Republican	Everett McBride	5,709	6.7
Republican	Daryl Abbas	5,707	6.7
Republican	Arthur Barnes (incumbent)	5,649	6.6
Republican	Betty Gay (incumbent)	5,618	6.6
Republican	Fred Doucette (incumbent)	5,618	6.6
Republican	Bob Elliott (incumbent)	5,519	6.5
Republican	John Janigian (incumbent)	5,429	6.4
Republican	Ed DeClercq	5,254	6.2
Democratic	Kelly Moss	4,767	5.6
Democratic	Bonnie Wright	4,294	5.0
Democratic	Janet Breslin	4,168	4.9
Democratic	Sean Lewis	3,717	4.4
Democratic	Jacqueline Muollo	3,673	4.3
Democratic	Cam Iannalfo	3,665	4.3
Democratic	Gregory Davis	3,633	4.3
Democratic	George Perry	3,468	4.1
Democratic	David Hickernell	3,363	4.0
Total votes		85,031	100.0
Republican hold			
Republican hold			
Republican hold			
Republican hold			
Republican hold			
Republican hold			
Republican hold			
Republican hold			
Republican hold			

==== Rockingham 9 ====
- Elects two representatives

Rockingham District 9 general election, 2018
Party	Candidate	Votes	%
Democratic	Mark Vallone	1,691	29.3
Republican	Sean Morrison (incumbent)	1,549	26.8
Republican	Michael Vose (incumbent)	1,433	24.8
Democratic	Jerry Marceau	1,105	19.1
Total votes		5,778	100.0
Democratic gain from Republican			
Republican hold			

==== Rockingham 10 ====
- Elects one representative

Rockingham District 10 general election, 2018
Party	Candidate	Votes	%
Republican	Dennis Acton	1,424	99.6
Total votes		1,430	100.0
Republican hold			

==== Rockingham 11 ====
- Elects one representative

Republican primary

Rockingham District 11 Republican primary
Party	Candidate	Votes	%
Republican	Allen Cook (incumbent)	220	55.3
Republican	Lois DeYoung	178	44.7
Total votes		398	100.0

General election

Rockingham District 11 general election, 2018
Party	Candidate	Votes	%
Democratic	Liz McConnell	1,098	52.4
Republican	Allen Cook (incumbent)	997	47.6
Total votes		2,095	100.0
Democratic gain from Republican			

==== Rockingham 12 ====
- Elects one representative

Rockingham District 12 general election, 2018
Party	Candidate	Votes	%
Republican	Scott Wallace	1,094	60.3
Democratic	Kenneth Peterson	720	39.7
Total votes		1,814	100.0
Republican hold			

==== Rockingham 13 ====
- Elects four representatives

Rockingham District 13 general election, 2018
Party	Candidate	Votes	%
Republican	Joe Guthrie (incumbent)	4,117	26.1
Republican	David Welch (incumbent)	4,007	25.4
Republican	Kenneth Weyler (incumbent)	3,855	24.4
Republican	Dennis Green (incumbent)	3,812	24.1
Total votes		15,792	100.0
Republican hold			
Republican hold			
Republican hold			
Republican hold			

==== Rockingham 14 ====
- Elects four representatives

Rockingham District 14 general election, 2018
Party	Candidate	Votes	%
Republican	Peter Torosian (incumbent)	3,623	15.7
Republican	Norman Major (incumbent)	3,615	15.7
Republican	Debra DeSimone (incumbent)	3,431	14.9
Republican	Robert Harb	3,207	13.9
Democratic	Kate Delfino	2,686	11.6
Democratic	Beth Cacciotti	2,257	9.8
Democratic	George Hamblen	2,155	9.4
Democratic	Peter McVay	2,037	8.9
Total votes		23,011	100.0
Republican hold			
Republican hold			
Republican hold			
Republican hold			

==== Rockingham 15 ====
- Elects one representative

Republican primary

Rockingham District 15 Republican primary
Party	Candidate	Votes	%
Republican	Charles Melvin	189	47.7
Republican	Paul Szot	139	35.1
Republican	James Summers	68	17.2
Total votes		396	100.0

General election

Rockingham District 15 general election, 2018
Party	Candidate	Votes	%
Republican	Charles Melvin	1,031	52.4
Democratic	Kate Michaels	936	47.6
Total votes		1,967	100.0
Republican hold			

==== Rockingham 16 ====
- Elects one representative

Rockingham District 16 general election, 2018
Party	Candidate	Votes	%
Republican	Dan Davis	1,496	51.0
Democratic	Peter Oldak	1,437	49.0
Total votes		2,933	100.0
Republican hold			

==== Rockingham 17 ====
- Elects three representatives

Rockingham District 17 general election, 2018
Party	Candidate	Votes	%
Democratic	Michael Cahill (incumbent)	3,262	28.5
Democratic	Charlotte DiLorenzo (incumbent)	3,181	27.8
Democratic	Ellen Read (incumbent)	3,049	26.7
Republican	Harrison DeBree	1,947	17.0
Total votes		11,439	100.0
Democratic hold			
Democratic hold			
Democratic hold			

==== Rockingham 18 ====
- Elects four representatives

Rockingham District 18 general election, 2018
Party	Candidate	Votes	%
Democratic	Julie Gilman (incumbent)	4,795	18.6
Democratic	Gaby Grossman	4,690	18.2
Democratic	Skip Berrien (incumbent)	4,522	17.5
Democratic	Lisa Bunker	4,504	17.5
Republican	Edward Duncan	2,522	9.8
Republican	Brian Griset	2,380	9.2
Republican	Robert Goeman	2,362	9.2
Total votes		25,775	100.0
Democratic hold			
Democratic hold			
Democratic hold			
Democratic hold			

==== Rockingham 19 ====
- Elects two representatives

Rockingham District 19 general election, 2018
Party	Candidate	Votes	%
Democratic	Debra Altschiller (incumbent)	2,293	28.9
Republican	Patrick Abrami (incumbent)	2,064	26.0
Democratic	Lester Cuff	1,932	24.4
Republican	Daniel Shepard	1,637	20.7
Total votes		7,926	100.0
Democratic hold			
Republican hold			

==== Rockingham 20 ====
- Elects three representatives

Rockingham District 20 general election, 2018
Party	Candidate	Votes	%
Republican	Aboul Khan (incumbent)	2,233	20.3
Republican	William Fowler	2,053	18.7
Republican	Max Abramson	1,980	18.0
Democratic	Patricia O'Keefe	1,819	16.6
Democratic	Greg Marrow	1,511	16.8
Democratic	Denis Rice	1,385	12.6
Total votes		10,981	100.0
Republican hold			
Republican hold			
Republican hold			

==== Rockingham 21 ====
- Elects four representatives

Republican primary

Rockingham District 21 Republican primary
Party	Candidate	Votes	%
Republican	Michelle Zaino	819	23.6
Republican	Tracy Emerick (incumbent)	743	21.4
Republican	Philip Bean (incumbent)	682	19.6
Republican	Sharleene Hurst	622	17.9
Republican	Mark Weatherby	609	17.5
Total votes		3,475	100.0

General election

Rockingham District 21 general election, 2018
Party	Candidate	Votes	%
Democratic	Mike Edgar (incumbent)	4,028	13.7
Democratic	Robert Cushing (incumbent)	4,027	13.7
Democratic	Tom Loughman	3,999	13.6
Democratic	Patricia Bushway	3,907	13.3
Republican	Philip Bean (incumbent)	3,541	12.0
Republican	Michelle Zaino	3,493	11.9
Republican	Tracy Emerick (incumbent)	3,306	11.2
Republican	Sharleene Hurst	3,089	10.5
Total votes		29,390	100.0
Democratic hold			
Democratic hold			
Democratic gain from Republican			
Democratic gain from Republican			

==== Rockingham 22 ====
- Elects one representative

Rockingham District 22 general election, 2018
Party	Candidate	Votes	%
Democratic	Jim Maggiore	1,381	53.3
Republican	Henry Marsh (incumbent)	1,209	46.7
Total votes		2,590	100.0
Democratic gain from Republican			

==== Rockingham 23 ====
- Elects one representative

Rockingham District 23 general election, 2018
Party	Candidate	Votes	%
Democratic	Dennis Malloy (incumbent)	1,580	56.3
Republican	Rob Robertson	1,224	43.7
Total votes		2,804	100.0
Democratic hold			

==== Rockingham 24 ====
- Elects two representatives

Rockingham District 24 general election, 2018
Party	Candidate	Votes	%
Democratic	Jaci Grote	2,249	27.5
Democratic	Kate Murray (incumbent)	2,229	27.3
Republican	Julie Tucker	1,945	23.8
Republican	Kate Catalano	1,722	21.1
Total votes		8,175	100.0
Democratic hold			
Democratic hold			

==== Rockingham 25 ====
- Elects one representative

Rockingham District 25 general election, 2018
Party	Candidate	Votes	%
Democratic	Laura Pantelakos (incumbent)	1,623	72.8
Republican	Tom Lukacz	606	27.2
Total votes		2,229	100.0
Democratic hold			

==== Rockingham 26 ====
- Elects one representative

Rockingham District 26 general election, 2018
Party	Candidate	Votes	%
Democratic	Rebecca McBeath (incumbent)	2,111	99.9
Total votes		2,113	100.0
Democratic hold			

==== Rockingham 27 ====
- Elects one representative

Rockingham District 27 general election, 2018
Party	Candidate	Votes	%
Democratic	Peter Somssich (incumbent)	1,481	99.3
Total votes		1,492	100.0
Democratic hold			

==== Rockingham 28 ====
- Elects one representative

Rockingham District 28 general election, 2018
Party	Candidate	Votes	%
Democratic	Gerry Ward (incumbent)	1,352	99.1
Total votes		1,364	100.0
Democratic hold			

==== Rockingham 29 ====
- Elects one representative

Rockingham District 29 general election, 2018
Party	Candidate	Votes	%
Democratic	David Meuse	1,669	99.3
Total votes		1,681	100.0
Democratic hold			

==== Rockingham 30 ====
- Elects one representative

Rockingham District 30 general election, 2018
Party	Candidate	Votes	%
Democratic	Jacqueline Cali-Pitts (incumbent)	6,761	99.4
Total votes		6,803	100.0
Democratic hold			

==== Rockingham 31 ====
- Elects one representative

Rockingham District 31 general election, 2018
Party	Candidate	Votes	%
Democratic	Tamara Le (incumbent)	4,285	58.7
Republican	Gianfranco Dirienzo	3,015	41.3
Total votes		7,300	100.0
Democratic hold			

==== Rockingham 32 ====
- Elects one representative

Rockingham District 32 general election, 2018
Party	Candidate	Votes	%
Republican	Terry Roy	4,648	54.2
Democratic	Tom Chase	3,923	45.8
Total votes		8,571	100.0
Republican hold			

==== Rockingham 33 ====
- Elects one representative

Rockingham District 33 general election, 2018
Party	Candidate	Votes	%
Republican	Josh Yokela	3,168	54.1
Democratic	Eric Turer	2,684	45.9
Total votes		5,852	100.0
Republican hold			

==== Rockingham 34 ====
- Elects one representative

Republican primary

Rockingham District 34 Republican primary
Party	Candidate	Votes	%
Republican	Mark Pearson (incumbent)	1,444	53.9
Republican	Bill Smith	1,234	46.1
Total votes		2,678	100.0

General election

Rockingham District 34 general election, 2018
Party	Candidate	Votes	%
Republican	Mark Pearson (incumbent)	7,915	60.4
Democratic	Mike Edgar	5,189	39.6
Total votes		13,104	100.0
Republican hold			

==== Rockingham 35 ====
- Elects one representative

Rockingham District 35 general election, 2018
Party	Candidate	Votes	%
Republican	Deborah Hobson	2,651	55.4
Democratic	Rick Faulconer	2,135	44.6
Total votes		4,786	100.0
Republican hold			

==== Rockingham 36 ====
- Elects one representative

Rockingham District 36 general election, 2018
Party	Candidate	Votes	%
Democratic	Patricia Lovejoy (incumbent)	10,895	64.2
Republican	Debra Picucci	6,084	35.8
Total votes		16,979	100.0
Democratic hold			

==== Rockingham 37 ====
- Elects one representative

Rockingham District 37 general election, 2018
Party	Candidate	Votes	%
Republican	Jason Janvrin	6,192	50.6
Democratic	Elaine Andrews-Ahearn	6,040	49.4
Total votes		12,232	100.0
Republican hold			

=== Strafford County ===
==== Strafford 1 ====
- Elects two representatives

Strafford District 1 general election, 2018
Party	Candidate	Votes	%
Republican	Peter Hayward	1,297	36.5
Republican	Abigail Rooney	1,249	35.1
Democratic	Larry Brown	1,009	28.4
Total votes		3,555	100.0
Republican hold			
Republican hold			

==== Strafford 2 ====
- Elects two representatives

Strafford District 2 general election, 2018
Party	Candidate	Votes	%
Republican	James Horgan (incumbent)	1,154	28.2
Republican	Joseph Pitre (incumbent)	1,065	26.0
Democratic	Emmanuel Krasner	1,001	24.5
Democratic	Sylvia Arcouette	872	21.3
Total votes		4,092	100.0
Republican hold			
Republican hold			

==== Strafford 3 ====
- Elects two representatives

Strafford District 3 general election, 2018
Party	Candidate	Votes	%
Republican	Michael Harrington (incumbent)	1,683	26.7
Republican	Kurt Wuelper (incumbent)	1,677	26.6
Democratic	Bob Perry	1,478	23.6
Democratic	Ellen Phillips	1,458	23.2
Total votes		6,296	100.0
Republican hold			
Republican hold			

==== Strafford 4 ====
- Elects two representatives

Strafford District 4 general election, 2018
Party	Candidate	Votes	%
Democratic	Cassandra Levesque	2,061	26.4
Democratic	Matthew Towne	1,983	25.4
Republican	Jenny Wilson	1,801	23.0
Republican	Robert Drew	1,787	22.9
Libertarian	Frank Bertone	187	2.4
Total votes		7,819	100.0
Democratic hold			
Democratic gain from Republican			

==== Strafford 5 ====
- Elects one representative

Republican primary

Strafford District 5 Republican primary
Party	Candidate	Votes	%
Republican	Scott Bugbee	191	67.7
Republican	Bill Fortune	91	22.3
Total votes		282	100.0

General election

Strafford District 5 general election, 2018
Party	Candidate	Votes	%
Democratic	Jeffrey Salloway (incumbent)	1,416	63.7
Republican	Scott Bugbee	808	26.3
Total votes		2,224	100.0
Democratic hold			

==== Strafford 6 ====
- Elects five representatives

Democratic primary

Strafford District 6 Democratic primary
Party	Candidate	Votes	%
Democratic	Marjorie Smith (incumbent)	1,597	19.2
Democratic	Janet Wall (incumbent)	1,592	19.2
Democratic	Judith Spang (incumbent)	1,511	18.2
Democratic	Cam Kenney	1,241	14.9
Democratic	Timothy Horrigan	1,226	14.8
Democratic	Wayne Burton (incumbent)	1,136	13.7
Total votes		8,303	100.0

General election

Strafford District 6 general election, 2018
Party	Candidate	Votes	%
Democratic	Janet Wall (incumbent) (Note: Having received >5% of write-in votes in the Republican primary, Rep. Wall was listed as a nominee of both the Democratic and Republican parties.)	6,436	22.3
Democratic	Marjorie Smith (incumbent)	5,286	18.2
Democratic	Judith Spang (incumbent)	5,137	17.8
Democratic	Cam Kenney	5,055	17.5
Democratic	Timothy Horrigan (incumbent)	5,046	17.5
Republican	Mark Racic	1,858	6.4
Democratic	Wayne Burton (incumbent) (write-in)	62	0.2
Total votes		28,916	100.0
Democratic hold			
Democratic hold			
Democratic hold			
Democratic hold			
Democratic hold			

==== Strafford 7 ====
- Elects one representative

Strafford District 7 general election, 2018
Party	Candidate	Votes	%
Democratic	Timothy Fontneau (incumbent)	1,107	53.8
Republican	Deborah Kaczynski	950	46.2
Total votes		2,057	100.0
Democratic hold			

==== Strafford 8 ====
- Elects one representative

Strafford District 8 general election, 2018
Party	Candidate	Votes	%
Democratic	Donna Ellis (incumbent)	831	53.8
Republican	Sharyn Stuart	713	46.2
Total votes		1,544	100.0
Democratic hold			

==== Strafford 9 ====
- Elects one representative

Strafford District 9 general election, 2018
Party	Candidate	Votes	%
Republican	Steven Beaudoin (incumbent)	1,136	54.9
Democratic	Elaine Lauterborn	933	45.1
Total votes		2,069	100.0
Republican hold			

==== Strafford 10 ====
- Elects one representative

Strafford District 10 general election, 2018
Party	Candidate	Votes	%
Republican	Jody McNally (incumbent)	960	50.8
Democratic	Amy Cann	921	49.2
Total votes		1,891	100.0
Republican hold			

==== Strafford 11 ====
- Elects one representative

Strafford District 11 general election, 2018
Party	Candidate	Votes	%
Democratic	Chuck Grassie (incumbent)	941	52.5
Republican	Sue DeLemus	853	47.5
Total votes		1,794	100.0
Democratic hold			

==== Strafford 12 ====
- Elects one representative

Strafford District 12 general election, 2018
Party	Candidate	Votes	%
Republican	Mac Kittredge	965	50.5
Democratic	Pamela Hubbard	944	49.4
Total votes		1,911	100.0
Republican hold			

==== Strafford 13 ====
- Elects one representative

Strafford District 13 general election, 2018
Party	Candidate	Votes	%
Democratic	Casey Conley (incumbent)	1,627	74.4
Republican	Debra Childs	559	25.6
Total votes		1,794	100.0
Democratic hold			

==== Strafford 14 ====
- Elects one representative

Strafford District 14 general election, 2018
Party	Candidate	Votes	%
Democratic	Kristina Fargo	1,334	65.9
Independent	Kate Harris	690	34.1
Total votes		2,024	100.0
Democratic hold			

==== Strafford 15 ====
- Elects one representative

Strafford District 15 general election, 2018
Party	Candidate	Votes	%
Democratic	Linn Opderbecke (incumbent)	1,686	58.8
Republican	Collin Coppinger	1,183	42.2
Total votes		2,869	100.0
Democratic hold			

==== Strafford 16 ====
- Elects one representative

Strafford District 16 general election, 2018
Party	Candidate	Votes	%
Democratic	Sherry Frost (incumbent)	1,703	99.1
Total votes		1,719	100.0
Democratic hold			

==== Strafford 17 ====
- Elects three representatives

Strafford District 17 general election, 2018
Party	Candidate	Votes	%
Democratic	Susan Treleaven (incumbent)	2,644	27.7
Democratic	Peter Bixby (incumbent)	2,484	26.0
Democratic	Kenneth Vincent (incumbent)	2,361	24.8
Republican	Michael Castaldo	2,049	21.5
Total votes		9,538	100.0
Democratic hold			
Democratic hold			
Democratic hold			

==== Strafford 18 ====
- Elects three representatives

Democratic primary

Strafford District 18 Democratic primary
Party	Candidate	Votes	%
Democratic	Wendy Chase	774	31.7
Democratic	Gerri Cannon	605	24.8
Democratic	Cecilia Rich	549	22.5
Democratic	Roger Berube (incumbent)	511	21.0
Total votes		2,439	100.0

General election

Strafford District 18 general election, 2018
Party	Candidate	Votes	%
Democratic	Wendy Chase	2,215	19.1
Democratic	Gerri Cannon	2,055	17.7
Democratic	Cecilia Rich	1,923	16.6
Republican	Matthew Spencer (incumbent)	1,727	14.9
Republican	Jodi Carnes	1,538	13.3
Republican	Padraic O'Hare	1,378	11.9
Independent	Dale Sprague (incumbent)	601	5.2
Libertarian	Jarec Rondeau	147	1.3
Total votes		11,584	100.0
Democratic hold			
Democratic hold			
Democratic gain from Republican			

==== Strafford 19 ====
- Elects one representative

Strafford District 19 general election, 2018
Party	Candidate	Votes	%
Democratic	Peter B. Schmidt (incumbent)	3,299	74.2
Republican	Patrick Coleman	1,150	25.8
Total votes		4,449	100.0
Democratic hold			

==== Strafford 20 ====
- Elects one representative

Strafford District 20 general election, 2018
Party	Candidate	Votes	%
Democratic	Tom Southworth (incumbent)	3,562	99.6
Total votes		3,576	100.0
Democratic hold			

==== Strafford 21 ====
- Elects one representative

Strafford District 21 general election, 2018
Party	Candidate	Votes	%
Democratic	Catt Sandler (incumbent)	4,998	56.7
Republican	Philip Munck	3,814	43.3
Total votes		8,812	100.0
Democratic hold			

==== Strafford 22 ====
- Elects one representative

Democratic primary

Strafford District 22 Democratic primary
Party	Candidate	Votes	%
Democratic	Peg Higgins	581	82.2
Democratic	Shawn Mickelonis	125	17.8
Total votes		706	100.0

General election

Strafford District 22 general election, 2018
Party	Candidate	Votes	%
Democratic	Peg Higgins	1,926	53.2
Republican	Thomas Kaczynski (incumbent)	1,697	46.8
Total votes		3,623	100.0
Democratic gain from Republican			

==== Strafford 23 ====
- Elects one representative

Strafford District 23 general election, 2018
Party	Candidate	Votes	%
Democratic	Sandra Keans (incumbent)	1,952	50.9
Republican	Don Leeman	1,884	49.1
Total votes		3,836	100.0
Democratic hold			

==== Strafford 24 ====
- Elects one representative

Strafford District 24 general election, 2018
Party	Candidate	Votes	%
Republican	Mona Perreault	1,720	47.2
Democratic	Jeremiah Minihan	1,548	42.5
Libertarian	Brandon Phinney (incumbent)	377	10.3
Total votes		3,645	100.0
Republican gain from Libertarian			

==== Strafford 25 ====
- Elects one representative

Strafford District 25 general election, 2018
Party	Candidate	Votes	%
Democratic	Amanda Gourgue (incumbent)	3,634	56.7
Republican	Joe Hannon	2,774	43.3
Total votes		6,408	100.0
Democratic hold			

=== Sullivan County ===
==== Sullivan 1 ====
- Elects two representatives

Sullivan District 1 general election, 2018
Party	Candidate	Votes	%
Democratic	Brian Sullivan (incumbent)	2,751	32.7
Democratic	Lee Oxenham (incumbent)	2,644	31.4
Republican	Virginia Drye	1,692	20.1
Republican	Tanya McIntire	1,330	15.8
Total votes		8,417	100.0
Democratic hold			
Democratic hold			

==== Sullivan 2 ====
- Elects one representative

Sullivan District 2 general election, 2018
Party	Candidate	Votes	%
Republican	Gates Lucas	1,136	52.8
Democratic	Sue Gottling (incumbent)	1,016	47.2
Total votes		2,152	100.0
Republican gain from Democratic			

==== Sullivan 3 ====
- Elects one representative

Sullivan District 3 general election, 2018
Party	Candidate	Votes	%
Democratic	Andrew O'Hearne	613	59.6
Republican	Francis Gauthier (incumbent)	416	40.4
Total votes		1,029	100.0
Democratic gain from Republican			

==== Sullivan 4 ====
- Elects one representative

Democratic primary

Sullivan District 4 Democratic primary
Party	Candidate	Votes	%
Democratic	Gary Merchant	224	72.5
Democratic	Larry Converse	85	27.5
Total votes		309	100.0

General election

Sullivan District 4 general election, 2018
Party	Candidate	Votes	%
Democratic	Gary Merchant	883	57.4
Republican	John O'Connor (incumbent)	655	42.6
Total votes		1,538	100.0
Democratic gain from Republican			

==== Sullivan 5 ====
- Elects one representative

Sullivan District 5 general election, 2018
Party	Candidate	Votes	%
Republican	Walter Stapleton	663	51.0
Democratic	Chad Rolston	636	49.0
Total votes		1,299	100.0
Republican gain from Democratic			

==== Sullivan 6 ====
- Elects two representatives

Democratic primary

Sullivan District 6 Democratic primary
Party	Candidate	Votes	%
Democratic	Virginia Irwin (incumbent)	365	50.3
Democratic	Larry Flint	211	29.1
Democratic	Peter Franklin	149	20.6
Total votes		725	100.0

General election

Sullivan District 6 general election, 2018
Party	Candidate	Votes	%
Republican	Skip Rollins (incumbent)	1,523	32.5
Republican	John Callum	1,103	23.5
Democratic	Virginia Irwin (incumbent)	1,079	23.0
Democratic	Larry Flint	983	20.9
Total votes		4,693	100.0
Republican hold			
Republican gain from Democratic			

==== Sullivan 7 ====
- Elects one representative

Sullivan District 7 general election, 2018
Party	Candidate	Votes	%
Republican	Judy Aron	1,122	53.1
Democratic	Claudia Istel	990	46.9
Total votes		2,112	100.0
Republican hold			

==== Sullivan 8 ====
- Elects one representative

Sullivan District 8 general election, 2018
Party	Candidate	Votes	%
Republican	Tom Laware (incumbent)	836	50.2
Democratic	John Streeter	829	49.8
Total votes		1,665	100.0
Republican hold			

==== Sullivan 9 ====
- Elects one representative

Sullivan District 9 general election, 2018
Party	Candidate	Votes	%
Democratic	Linda Tanner (incumbent)	4,938	53.3
Republican	Francis Gauthier	4,335	46.7
Total votes		9,273	100.0
Democratic hold			

==== Sullivan 10 ====
- Elects one representative

Sullivan District 10 general election, 2018
Party	Candidate	Votes	%
Democratic	John Cloutier (incumbent)	2,289	58.7
Republican	Conlin Smith	1,609	41.3
Total votes		3,898	100.0
Democratic hold			

==== Sullivan 11 ====
- Elects one representative

Sullivan District 11 general election, 2018
Party	Candidate	Votes	%
Republican	Steven D. Smith (incumbent)	2,057	54.7
Democratic	Bruce Cragin	1,703	45.3
Total votes		3,760	100.0
Republican hold			

== See also ==
- United States elections, 2018
- United States House of Representatives elections in New Hampshire, 2018
- New Hampshire gubernatorial election, 2018
- List of New Hampshire General Courts
