= Bob Rimol =

American politician

Member of New Hampshire House of Representatives for Rockingham 5
- In office 2016 – December 4, 2018

Personal details
- Party: Republican
- Education: University of Vermont; Fairleigh Dickinson University

Bob Rimol is an American politician. He was a member of the New Hampshire House of Representatives and represented Rockingham 5th district from 2016 to 2018. Rimol is the owner and founder of Rimol Greenhouse Systems in Hooksett, New Hampshire.
