= Robert Graham (New Hampshire politician) =

American politician

Member of New Hampshire House of Representatives for Strafford 1
- In office November 10, 2015 – December 4, 2018

Personal details
- Party: Republican

Robert Graham is an American politician. He was a member of the New Hampshire House of Representatives from 2015 to 2018.
