= Francis Gauthier =

American politician

Member of the New Hampshire House of Representatives from the 3rd Sullivan district
- In office December 7, 2016 – December 5, 2018
- Preceded by: Andrew O'Hearne
- Succeeded by: Andrew O'Hearne

Personal details
- Party: Republican

Francis Gauthier is an American politician. He served as a Republican member for the Sullivan 3rd district of the New Hampshire House of Representatives. He was first elected in 2016. He lost reelection in 2018.
