= Bill Kuch =

American politician

Member of New Hampshire House of Representatives for Merrimack 23
- In office 2014–2018

Personal details
- Party: Republican

Bill Kuch is an American politician. He was a member of the New Hampshire House of Representatives and represented Merrimack 23rd district from 2014 to 2018.
