= Tony Pellegrino =

American politician

Member of the New Hampshire House of Representatives from the Hillsborough 21st district
- In office 2008–2018

Personal details
- Born: September 18, 1943 (age 82)
- Party: Republican

Anthony Pellegrino (born September 18, 1943) is an American politician in the state of New Hampshire. He was a member of the New Hampshire House of Representatives, sitting as a Republican from the Hillsborough 21 district, having been first elected in 2008.
