= Jonathan Manley =

American politician

Member of the New Hampshire House of Representatives from the Hillsborough 3rd district
- In office December 5, 2012 – December 5, 2018
- Succeeded by: Dan Pickering

Personal details
- Party: Democratic

Jonathan F. Manley Sr. is a former member of the New Hampshire House of Representatives.

== Career ==
Manley has worked as a teacher and as the clerk of the Bennington Conservation Commission. On November 6, 2012, Manley was first elected to the New Hampshire House of Representatives where he represented the Hillsborough 3 district. He served in this capacity from December 5, 2012 to December 5, 2018. He is a Democrat.

== Personal life ==
Manley resides in Bennington, New Hampshire.
