= Elizabeth Farnham =

American politician

Member of New Hampshire House of Representatives for Rockingham 18
- In office 2016–2018

Personal details
- Party: Democratic

Elizabeth (Betsey) M. Farnham was an American politician. She was a member of the New Hampshire House of Representatives.
