= Tiffany Johnson =

American politician

Member of the New Hampshire House of Representatives
- In office 2016 – December 4, 2018
- Constituency: Grafton 7

Personal details
- Party: Republican

Tiffany Johnson is an American politician from New Hampshire. She served in the New Hampshire House of Representatives. She was elected in 2016.
