= Bob Nigrello =

American politician

Member of the New Hampshire House of Representatives
- In office 2012–2018
- Constituency: Rockingham 16

Personal details
- Party: Republican

Robert L. "Bob" Nigrello is an American politician from New Hampshire. He served in the New Hampshire House of Representatives.
