= Jody McNally =

American politician

Member of the New Hampshire House of Representatives
- In office November 8, 2016 – January 1, 2020
- Constituency: Strafford 10

Personal details
- Party: Republican

Jody L. McNally is an American politician. She was a member of the New Hampshire House of Representatives and represented Strafford 10th district.
