= Steven Rand (politician) =

American politician

Member of New Hampshire House of Representatives for Grafton 8
- In office 2016 – December 4, 2018

Personal details
- Party: Democratic
- Education: Boston University

Steven Rand is an American politician. He was a member of the New Hampshire House of Representatives and represented Grafton 8th district.
