= Francis Chase =

American politician

Member of the New Hampshire House of Representatives
- In office 2014–2018
- Constituency: Rockingham 20

Personal details
- Party: Republican

Francis Chase is an American politician from New Hampshire. He served in the New Hampshire House of Representatives.
