= Richard Gordon (New Hampshire politician) =

American politician

Member of the New Hampshire House of Representatives
- In office 2012–2018
- Constituency: Rockingham 35

Personal details
- Party: Republican

Richard Gordon is an American politician from New Hampshire. He served in the New Hampshire House of Representatives.
