= Gregory Smith (New Hampshire politician) =

American politician

Member of New Hampshire House of Representatives for Hillsborough 37
- In office 2014–2018

Personal details
- Party: Republican

Gregory Smith is an American politician. He was a member of the New Hampshire House of Representatives and represented Hillsborough 37th district.
