= Philip Bean (politician) =

American politician

Member of the New Hampshire House of Representatives
- In office 2016 – December 4, 2018
- Constituency: Rockingham 21

Personal details
- Party: Republican

Philip Webb Bean is an American politician from New Hampshire. He served in the New Hampshire House of Representatives.
