= Michael Trento =

American politician

Member of the New Hampshire House of Representatives
- In office 2018 – June 4, 2019
- Constituency: Hillsborough 7

Personal details
- Party: Republican

Michael D. Trento is an American politician from New Hampshire. He served in the New Hampshire House of Representatives. Trento resigned on June 4, 2019.
