= James Whittemore (politician) =

American politician

Member of New Hampshire House of Representatives for Hillsborough 37
- In office December 5, 2018 – March 27, 2020

Personal details
- Died: March 27, 2020
- Party: Republican

James Whittemore (died March 27, 2020) was an American politician. He was a member of the New Hampshire House of Representatives and represented Hillsborough 37th district.
