= Frank Sterling Jr. =

American politician

Member of the New Hampshire House of Representatives
- In office 2014–2018
- Constituency: Cheshire 14

Member of the New Hampshire House of Representatives
- In office 2008–2012
- Constituency: Cheshire 7

Personal details
- Party: Republican

Franklin W. (Frank) Sterling, Jr. is an American politician from New Hampshire. He served in the New Hampshire House of Representatives.

Sterling was a selectman in Jaffrey, New Hampshire.
