= Dick Patten =

American politician (died 2021)

Member of the New Hampshire House of Representatives from the Merrimack 17th district
- In office 2010–2018

Personal details
- Died: January 2021 (aged 69)
- Party: Democratic

Dick Patten (died January 2021) was an American politician. He served as a Democratic member for the Merrimack 17th of the New Hampshire House of Representatives.

== Life and career ==
Patten was a city councilor.

Patten served in the New Hampshire House of Representatives from 2010 to 2018.

Patten died in January 2021.
