= Patricia Dowling (New Hampshire politician) =

American politician

Pat Dowling

Member of the New Hampshire House of Representatives from the 6th Rockingham district
- In office December 7, 2016 – December 4, 2018
- Preceded by: Multi-member district
- Succeeded by: Multi-member district

Member of the New Hampshire House of Representatives from the 5th Rockingham district
- In office December 1, 2004 – December 5, 2012
- Preceded by: District established
- Succeeded by: Multi-member district

Member of the New Hampshire House of Representatives from the 13th Rockingham district
- In office December 2, 1992 – December 4, 2002
- Preceded by: Multi-member district
- Succeeded by: District abolished

Member of the New Hampshire House of Representatives from the 7th Rockingham district
- In office December 5, 1990 – December 2, 1992
- Preceded by: Multi-member district
- Succeeded by: Joseph E. Stone

Personal details
- Born: October 27, 1942 (age 83) Lawrence, Massachusetts
- Party: Republican
- Education: New Hampshire College

Patricia Dowling (born October 27, 1942) is an American politician in the state of New Hampshire. She is a member of the New Hampshire House of Representatives, sitting as a Republican from the Rockingham 6 district, having been first elected in 2010. She previously served from 1990-2002 and 2004-2012.
