= James C. Webb =

American politician

James C. Webb is an American politician from Derry, New Hampshire, and a former member of the New Hampshire House of Representatives.
