= 2020 New Hampshire gubernatorial election =

- November 3, 2020
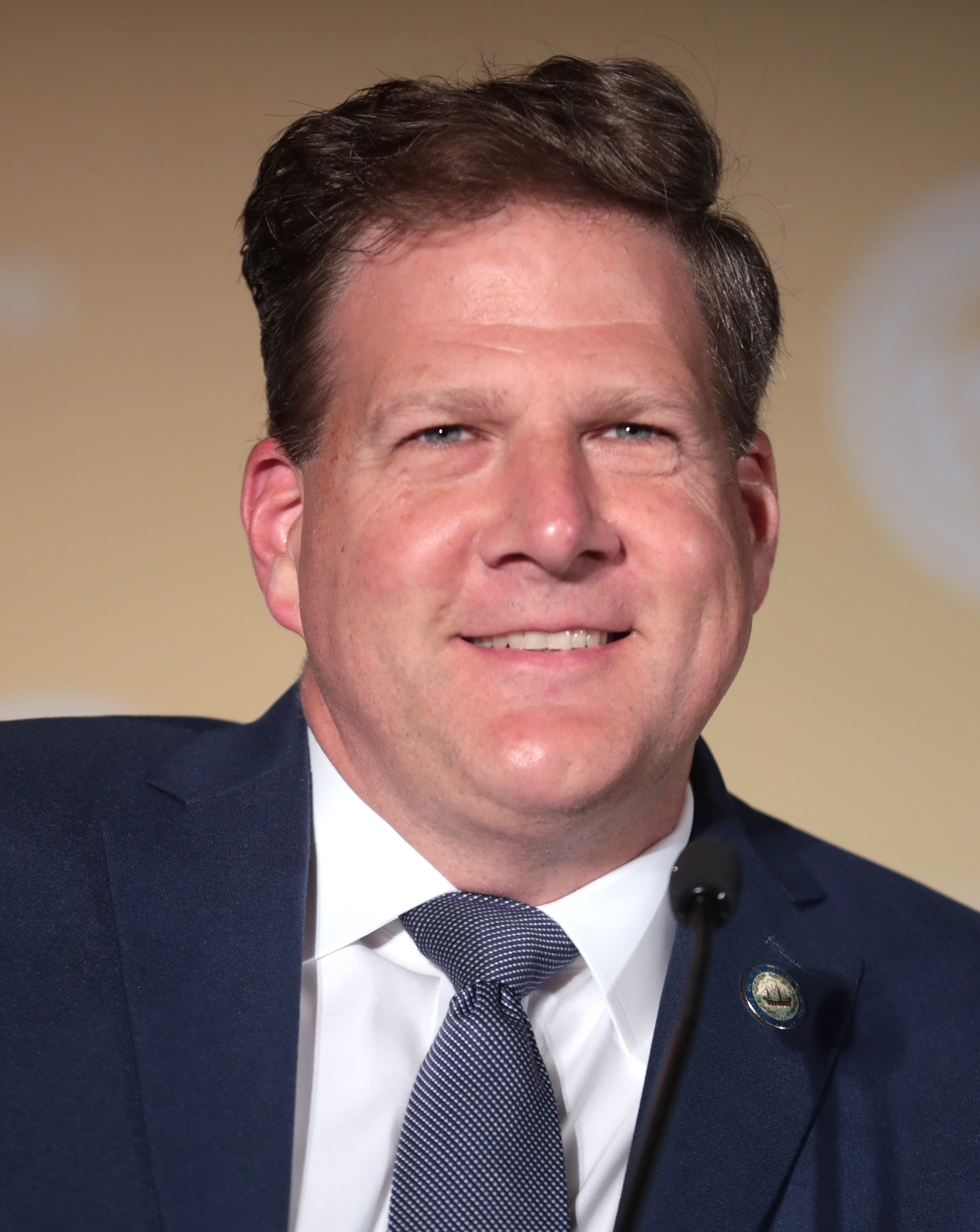

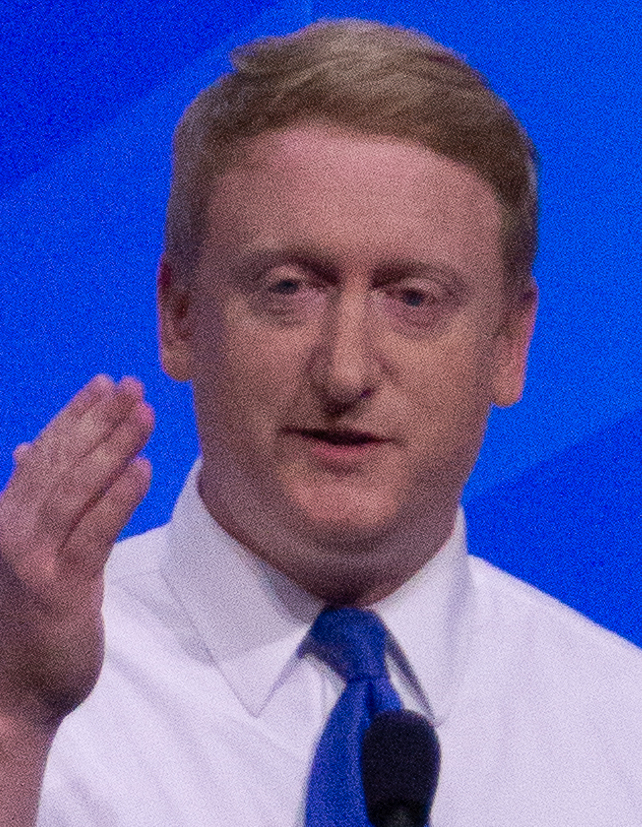
Nominee	Chris Sununu	Dan Feltes
Party	Republican	Democratic
Popular vote	516,609	264,639
Percentage	65.12%	33.36%
- Sununu: 40–50% 50–60% 60–70% 70–80% 80–90% >90% Feltes: 40–50% 50–60% 60–70% 70–80% >90% No votes
Governor before election
Chris Sununu
Republican
Elected Governor
Chris Sununu
Republican

The 2020 New Hampshire gubernatorial election was held on November 3, 2020, to elect the governor of New Hampshire. Incumbent Republican Governor Chris Sununu was elected to a third two-year term in office with more than 65% of votes and winning every county, defeating his opponent Dan Feltes, the Majority Leader of the Senate. Nine governors ran for re-election in this cycle and all nine were re-elected. Sununu's win marked the first time since 1986 that a Republican was elected to a third term as governor, in which year his father, John H. Sununu was reelected for his third and final term. The elder Sununu chose not to seek reelection in 1988, instead becoming George H. W. Bush's chief of staff in 1989.

Sununu became the first person to get more than 500,000 votes in the state's electoral history. As of 2026, this is the only gubernatorial election since 2012 where any candidate won every county.

== Republican primary ==
=== Candidates ===
==== Nominee ====
- Chris Sununu, incumbent governor of New Hampshire

==== Eliminated in primary ====
- Nobody, activist formerly known as Rich Paul
- Karen Testerman, Franklin city councilor

==== Declined ====
- Kelly Ayotte, former U.S. senator (2011-2017)
- Frank Edelblut, commissioner of the New Hampshire Department of Education and candidate for governor in 2016
- Chuck Morse, minority leader of the New Hampshire Senate

=== Polling ===
Poll source	Date(s) administered	Sample size (Note: Key: A – all adults RV – registered voters LV – likely voters V – unclear)	Margin of error	Chris Sununu	Karen Testerman	Other	Undecided
University of New Hampshire	August 28 – September 1, 2020	703 (LV)	± 3.7%	82%	15%	1% (Note: "Another candidate" with 1%)	2%
Robocent/Free Keene	August 24, 2020	1,219 (RV)	± 2.8%	79%	5%	–	16% (Note: Listed as "Nobody" - the answer respondents gave when asked towards which candidate they leaned)
Saint Anselm College	August 15–17, 2020	475 (RV)	± 4.5%	82%	7%	3% (Note: "Someone else" with 3%)	8%

=== Results ===
Results by county: Sununu—80–90% Sununu—≥90%

Republican primary results
Party	Candidate	Votes	%
Republican	Chris Sununu (incumbent)	130,703	89.67%
Republican	Karen Testerman	13,589	9.32%
Republican	Nobody	1,239	0.85%
Democratic	Andru Volinsky (write-in)	93	0.063%
Democratic	Dan Feltes (write-in)	3	0.002%
Total votes		145,757	100.0%

== Democratic primary ==
=== Candidates ===
==== Nominee ====
- Dan Feltes, majority leader of the New Hampshire Senate

==== Eliminated in primary ====
- Andru Volinsky, member of the Executive Council of New Hampshire

==== Declined ====
- Joyce Craig, mayor of Manchester
- Molly Kelly, former state senator and nominee for Governor of New Hampshire in 2018
- Steve Marchand, former mayor of Portsmouth and candidate for Governor of New Hampshire in 2016 and 2018
- Mindi Messmer, former state representative and candidate for New Hampshire's 1st congressional district in 2018 (running for Executive Council)

=== Endorsements ===
Dan Feltes

Local and state politicians

- Michael Abbott, state representative
- Susan Almy, state representative
- Debra Altschiller, state representative
- Bob Backus, state representative
- Chris Balch, state representative
- Paul Berch, state representative
- Jennifer Bernet, state representative
- Skip Berrien, state representative
- Donald Buchard, state representative
- Anita Burroughs, state representative
- Polly Campion, state representative
- Shannon Chandley, state senator
- Clyde Carson, state representative
- Wendy Chase, state representative
- Jackie Chretien, state representative
- Bruce Cohen, state representative
- Patricia Cornell, state representative
- Francesca Diggs, state representative
- Karen Ebel, state representative
- Mike Edgar, state representative
- Timothy Egan, state representative
- Susan M. Ford, state representative
- Elaine French, state representative
- Ken N. Gidge, state representative
- Jeff Goley, state representative
- Willis Griffith, state representative
- Heidi Hamer, state representative
- Linda Harriott-Gathright, state representative
- Bill Hatch, state representative
- Mary Heath, state representative
- Martha Hennessey, state senator
- David Huot, state representative
- David Karrick, state representative
- Patricia Klee, state representative
- Diane Langley, state representative
- Tamara Le, state representative
- Cassandra Levesque, state representative
- Melanie Levesque, state senator
- Douglas Ley, state House Majority Leader and state representative
- Pat Long, state representative
- Tom Loughman, state representative
- Patricia Lovejoy, state representative
- David Luneau, state representative
- Jim MacKay, state representative
- Latha Mangipudi, state representative
- John Mann, state representative
- Joelle Martin, state representative
- Liz McConnell, state representative
- Howard Moffett, state representative
- Mary Jane Mulligan, state representative
- Nancy Murphy, state representative
- Megan Murray, state representative
- Garrett Muscatel, state representative
- Mel Myler, state representative
- Sue Newman, state representative
- Ray Newman, state representative
- Sharon Nordgren, state representative
- Fran Nutter-Upham, state representative
- Laura Pantelakos, state representative
- Marjorie Porter, state representative
- Julie Radhakrishnan, state representative
- Beth Richards, state representative
- Beth Rodd, state representative
- Cindy Rosenwald, state senator
- Charlie St. Clair, state representative
- Tom Sherman, state senator
- Ken Snow, state representative
- Timothy Soucy, state representative
- Tom Southworth, state representative
- Brian Sullivan, state representative
- Bruce Tatro, state representative
- Laura Telerski, state representative
- Edith Tucker, state representative
- Suzanne Vail, state representative
- Ken Vincent, state representative
- Mary Beth Walz, state representative
- Gerald Ward, state representative
- David H. Watters, state senator
- Ken Wells, state representative
- Kermit Williams, state representative
- Matt Wilhelm, state representative
- David Woodbury, state representative

Labor unions

- Laborer's Union Locals 668, 976

=== Polling ===
Poll source	Date(s) administered	Sample size	Margin of error	Dan Feltes	Andru Volinsky	Other	Undecided
University of New Hampshire	August 28 – September 1, 2020	839 (LV)	± 3.4%	36%	38%	4% (Note: "Another candidate" with 4%)	22%
Saint Anselm College	August 15–17, 2020	498 (RV)	± 4.4%	22%	19%	13% (Note: "Someone else" with 13%)	46%

=== Results ===
Results by county: Feltes—50–60% Volinsky—50–60%

Democratic primary results
Party	Candidate	Votes	%
Democratic	Dan Feltes	72,318	50.90%
Democratic	Andru Volinsky	65,455	46.06%
Republican	Chris Sununu (write-in)	4,276	3.00%
Republican	Karen Testerman (write-in)	39	0.03%
Republican	Nobody (write-in)	6	0.01%
Total votes		142,094	100.0%

== Other candidates ==
=== Libertarian Party ===
==== Nominee ====
- Darryl W. Perry, author and candidate for U.S. president in 2016

=== Independent ===
==== Did not qualify for the ballot ====
- Bill Fortune

== General election ==
=== Predictions ===
Source	Ranking	As of
The Cook Political Report	Safe R	October 23, 2020
Inside Elections	Likely R	October 28, 2020
Sabato's Crystal Ball	Likely R	November 2, 2020
Politico	Likely R	November 2, 2020
Daily Kos	Safe R	October 28, 2020
RCP	Likely R	November 2, 2020
270towin	Likely R	November 2, 2020

=== Endorsements ===
Dan Feltes (D)

Local and state politicians

- Michael Abbott, state representative
- Susan Almy, state representative
- Debra Altschiller, state representative
- Bob Backus, state representative
- Chris Balch, state representative
- Paul Berch, state representative
- Jennifer Bernet, state representative
- Skip Berrien, state representative
- Donald Buchard, state representative
- Anita Burroughs, state representative
- Polly Campion, state representative
- Clyde Carson, state representative
- Shannon Chandley, state senator
- Wendy Chase, state representative
- Jackie Chretien, state representative
- Bruce Cohen, state representative
- Patricia Cornell, state representative
- Francesca Diggs, state representative
- Karen Ebel, state representative
- Mike Edgar, state representative
- Timothy Egan, state representative
- Susan M. Ford, state representative
- Elaine French, state representative
- Ken N. Gidge, state representative
- Jeff Goley, state representative
- Willis Griffith, state representative
- Heidi Hamer, state representative
- Linda Harriott-Gathright, state representative
- Bill Hatch, state representative
- Mary Heath, state representative
- Martha Hennessey, state senator
- David Huot, state representative
- David Karrick, state representative
- Patricia Klee, state representative
- Diane Langley, state representative
- Tamara Le, state representative
- Cassandra Levesque, state representative
- Melanie Levesque, state senator
- Douglas Ley, state House Majority Leader and state representative
- Pat Long, state representative
- Tom Loughman, state representative
- Patricia Lovejoy, state representative
- David Luneau, state representative
- Jim MacKay, state representative
- Latha Mangipudi, state representative
- John Mann, state representative
- Joelle Martin, state representative
- Liz McConnell, state representative
- Howard Moffett, state representative
- Mary Jane Mulligan, state representative
- Nancy Murphy, state representative
- Megan Murray, state representative
- Garrett Muscatel, state representative
- Mel Myler, state representative
- Sue Newman, state representative
- Ray Newman, state representative
- Sharon Nordgren, state representative
- Fran Nutter-Upham, state representative
- Laura Pantelakos, state representative
- Marjorie Porter, state representative
- Julie Radhakrishnan, state representative
- Beth Richards, state representative
- Beth Rodd, state representative
- Cindy Rosenwald, state senator
- Charlie St. Clair, state representative
- Tom Sherman, state senator
- Ken Snow, state representative
- Timothy Soucy, state representative
- Tom Southworth, state representative
- Brian Sullivan, state representative
- Bruce Tatro, state representative
- Laura Telerski, state representative
- Edith Tucker, state representative
- Suzanne Vail, state representative
- Ken Vincent, state representative
- Mary Beth Walz, state representative
- Gerald Ward, state representative
- David H. Watters, state senator
- Ken Wells, state representative
- Matt Wilhelm, state representative
- Kermit Williams, state representative
- David Woodbury, state representative
Darryl W. Perry (L)

Politicians

- Ken Armstrong, 2020 Libertarian candidate for president/vice president
- Caleb Q. Dyer, former state representative and House Libertarian Caucus leader

=== Polling ===
View source data.

Poll source	Date(s) administered	Sample size	Margin of error	Chris Sununu (R)	Dan Feltes (D)	Other / Undecided
American Research Group	October 26–28, 2020	864 (LV)	± 4.6%	51%	46%	3% (Note: Perry (L) with 1%; Undecided with 2%)
University of New Hampshire	October 24–28, 2020	1,889 (LV)	± 2.3%	60%	36%	3% (Note: Perry (L) with 2%; "Another candidate" with <1%; Undecided with 1%)
Saint Anselm College	October 23–26, 2020	1,018 (LV)	± 3.1%	60%	35%	6% (Note: Perry (L) and "Someone else" with 1%; Undecided with 4%)
YouGov/UMass Amherst	October 16–26, 2020	757 (LV)	± 4.5%	59%	36%	5% (Note: "Another candidate" with 1%; Undecided with 4%)
University of New Hampshire	October 9–12, 2020	899 (LV)	± 3.2%	62%	37%	1% (Note: Perry (L) with <1%; Undecided with 1%)
Suffolk University	October 8–12, 2020	500 (LV)	± 4.4%	55%	31%	14% (Note: Perry (L) with 4%; "Refused" with 2%; "Other" with no voters; Undecided with 8%)
Saint Anselm College	October 1–4, 2020	1,147 (LV)	± 2.9%	58%	35%	7% (Note: Perry (L) with 2%; "Someone else" with 1%; Undecided with 5%)
Emerson College	September 30 – October 1, 2020	700 (LV)	± 3.6%	55%	40%	5% (Note: "Someone else" with 3%; Undecided with 2%)
American Research Group	September 25–28, 2020	600 (LV)	± 4%	52%	44%	4% (Note: Perry (L) with 0%; Undecided with 3%)
University of New Hampshire	September 24–28, 2020	972 (LV)	± 3.1%	55%	37%	5%
YouGov/UMass Lowell	September 17–25, 2020	657 (LV)	± 4.6%	60%	34%	7% (Note: "Another candidate" with 1%; Undecided with 6%)
University of New Hampshire	August 28 – September 1, 2020	1,889 (LV)	± 2.3%	57%	33%	9% (Note: Perry (L) with 1%; Undecided with 8%)
University of New Hampshire	July 16–28, 2020	1,893 (LV)	± 2.2%	59%	28%	13% (Note: "Another candidate" with 1%; Undecided with 12%)
University of New Hampshire	June 18–22, 2020	932 (LV)	± 2.8%	62%	23%	15% (Note: "Another candidate" with 2%; Undecided with 13%)
We Ask America	June 13–15, 2020	500 (LV)	± 4.4%	59%	20%	21% (Note: Undecided with 21%)
University of New Hampshire	May 14–18, 2020	788 (LV)	± 3.2%	61%	21%	18% (Note: "Another candidate" with 0%; Undecided with 18%)
University of New Hampshire	February 19–25, 2020	576 (LV)	± 4.1%	56%	27%	18% (Note: "Another candidate" with 4%; Undecided with 14%)
Emerson College	September 6–9, 2019	1,041 (RV)	± 3.0%	53%	37%	10% (Note: Undecided with 10%)

Hypothetical polling

with Andru Volinsky

Poll source	Date(s) administered	Sample size	Margin of error	Chris Sununu (R)	Andru Volinsky (D)	Other / Undecided
University of New Hampshire	August 28 – September 1, 2020	1,889 (LV)	± 2.3%	58%	32%	8% (Note: Perry (L) with 1%; Undecided with 7%)
University of New Hampshire	July 16–28, 2020	1,893 (LV)	± 2.2%	58%	29%	13%
University of New Hampshire	June 18–22, 2020	932 (LV)	± 2.8%	62%	22%	16% (Note: "Another candidate" with 2%; Undecided with 14%)
University of New Hampshire	May 14–18, 2020	788 (LV)	± 3.2%	61%	20%	19% (Note: "Another candidate" with 0%; Undecided with 19%)
University of New Hampshire	February 19–25, 2020	576 (LV)	± 4.1%	54%	29%	16% (Note: "Another candidate" with 3%; Undecided with 13%)

=== Results ===
2020 New Hampshire gubernatorial election
Party	Candidate	Votes	%	±%
Republican	Chris Sununu (incumbent)	516,609	65.12%	+12.34%
Democratic	Dan Feltes	264,639	33.36%	−12.38%
Libertarian	Darryl W. Perry	11,329	1.43%	0.00%
Write-in		683	0.09%	+0.04%
Total votes		793,260	100.0%	
Turnout		814,449	68.16%	
Registered electors		1,194,843		
Republican hold				

==== By county ====
By county

County	Chris Sununu Republican		Dan Feltes Democratic		Darryl Perry Libertarian		Write-in		Margin		Total votes
County	#	%	#	%	#	%	#	%	#	%	Total votes
Belknap	28,074	73.68	9,491	24.91	500	1.31	38	0.10	18,583	48.77	38,103
Carroll	22,119	67.20	10,428	31.68	348	1.06	20	0.06	11,691	35.52	32,915
Cheshire	24,708	56.79	17,973	41.31	781	1.79	49	0.11	6,735	15.48	43,511
Coös	11,409	69.78	4,666	28.54	265	1.62	10	0.06	6,743	41.24	16,350
Grafton	29,174	54.96	23,023	43.38	838	1.58	43	0.08	6,151	11.59	53,078
Hillsborough	150,153	66.29	72,614	32.06	3,524	1.56	200	0.09	77,539	34.23	226,491
Merrimack	56,266	63.16	31,572	35.44	1,145	1.29	106	0.12	24,694	27.72	89,089
Rockingham	134,292	68.17	60,232	30.58	2,337	1.19	135	0.07	74,060	37.59	196,996
Strafford	44,542	61.35	26,791	36.90	1,205	1.66	67	0.09	17,751	24.45	72,605
Sullivan	15,872	65.80	7,849	32.54	386	1.60	15	0.06	8,023	33.26	24,122
Totals	516,609	65.12	264,639	33.36	11,329	1.43	683	0.09	251,970	31.76	793,260

Counties that flipped from Democratic to Republican

- Cheshire (largest municipality: Keene)
- Grafton (largest municipality: Lebanon)
- Strafford (largest municipality: Dover)

==== By congressional district ====
Sununu won both congressional districts, which both elected Democrats.

District	Sununu	Feltes	Representative
1st	67%	32%	Chris Pappas
2nd	63%	35%	Annie Kuster

== See also ==
- 2020 New Hampshire elections
