= Results of the 2020 New Hampshire House of Representatives election =

New Hampshire House of Representatives election, 2020
- November 3, 2020

All 400 seats in the New Hampshire House of Representatives 201 seats needed for a majority

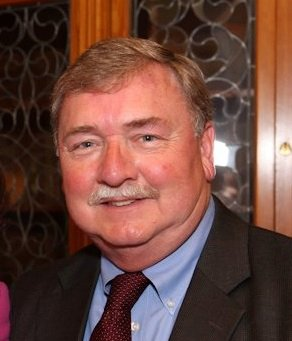
	Majority party	Minority party
Leader	Dick Hinch	Steve Shurtleff
Party	Republican	Democratic
Leader's seat	Hillsborough 21	Merrimack 11
Last election	166	234
Seats before	159	231
Seats won	213	187
Seat change	▲47	▼47
Popular vote	1,319,131	1,267,790
Percentage	50.9%	48.9%
Speaker before election
Steve Shurtleff
Democratic
Elected Speaker
Dick Hinch (Note: Hinch died of COVID-19 one week after being elected Speaker. He was succeeded as speaker by Sherman Packard.)
Republican

== Belknap County ==
=== Belknap 1 ===
- Elects one representative

Belknap 1 general election, 2020
Party	Candidate	Votes	%
Republican	Tom Ploszaj	1,338	60.1
Democratic	Robert Joseph Jr.	887	39.9
Total votes		2,225	100.0
Republican hold			

=== Belknap 2 ===
- Elects four representatives

Republican primary

Belknap 2 Republican primary
Party	Candidate	Votes	%
Republican	Harry Bean (incumbent)	1,673	24.6
Republican	Glen Aldrich (incumbent)	1,626	23.9
Republican	Norm Silber	1,356	19.9
Republican	Jonathan Mackie (incumbent)	1,082	15.9
Republican	Deanna Jurius (incumbent)	1,074	15.8
Total votes		6,811	100.0

General election

Belknap 2 general election, 2020
Party	Candidate	Votes	%
Republican	Glen Aldrich (incumbent)	4,761	14.2
Republican	Harry Bean (incumbent)	4,736	14.1
Republican	Norm Silber	4,490	13.4
Republican	Jonathan Mackie (incumbent)	4,378	13.1
Democratic	Natalie Taylor	3,956	11.8
Democratic	Shelley Carita	3,865	11.5
Democratic	Diane Hanley	3,818	11.4
Democratic	Dara McCue	3,482	10.4
Total votes		33,486	100.0
Republican hold			
Republican hold			
Republican hold			
Republican hold			

=== Belknap 3 ===
- Elects four representatives

Democratic primary

Belknap 3 Democratic primary
Party	Candidate	Votes	%
Democratic	Marcia Hayward	1,113	25.4
Democratic	David Huot (incumbent)	1,064	24.3
Democratic	Gail Ober	979	22.3
Democratic	Carlos Cardona	852	19.4
Democratic	Samuel Hoehn	374	8.5
Total votes		4,382	100.0

General election

Belknap 3 general election, 2020
Party	Candidate	Votes	%
Republican	Gregg Hough	4,186	14.4
Republican	Mike Bordes	4,059	13.9
Republican	Dawn Johnson	3,922	13.5
Republican	Richard Littlefield	3,831	13.2
Democratic	David Huot (incumbent)	3,512	12.1
Democratic	Marcia Hayward	3,390	11.6
Democratic	Gail Ober	3,255	11.2
Democratic	Carlos Cardona	2,952	10.1
Total votes		29,107	100.0
Republican gain from Democratic			
Republican hold			
Republican hold			
Republican hold			

=== Belknap 4 ===
- Elects two representatives

Belknap 4 general election, 2020
Party	Candidate	Votes	%
Republican	Timothy Lang (incumbent)	2,196	37.7
Republican	Juliet Harvey-Bolia	1,796	30.8
Democratic	Jane Alden	1,720	29.5
Democratic	Rich Burke (write-in)	117	2.0
Total votes		5,829	100.0
Republican hold			
Republican hold			

=== Belknap 5 ===
- Elects two representatives

Belknap 5 general election, 2020
Party	Candidate	Votes	%
Republican	Peter Varney (incumbent)	3,651	32.7
Republican	Paul Terry	3,539	31.7
Democratic	Duane Hammond	2,003	17.9
Democratic	Stephen Copithorne	1,974	17.7
Total votes		11,167	100.0
Republican hold			
Republican hold			

=== Belknap 6 ===
- Elects two representatives

Republican primary

Belknap 6 Republican primary
Party	Candidate	Votes	%
Republican	Mike Sylvia (incumbent)	658	43.4
Republican	Douglas Trottier	387	25.6
Republican	John Plumer (incumbent)	239	15.8
Republican	Shari Lebreche	230	15.2
Total votes		1,514	100.0

General election

Belknap 6 general election, 2020
Party	Candidate	Votes	%
Republican	Mike Sylvia (incumbent)	2,289	34.2
Republican	Douglas Trottier	2,091	31.3
Democratic	George Condodemetraky	1,158	17.3
Democratic	Don House	1,152	17.2
Total votes		6,690	100.0
Republican hold			
Republican hold			

=== Belknap 7 ===
- Elects one representative

Belknap 7 general election, 2020
Party	Candidate	Votes	%
Republican	Barbara Comtois (incumbent)	1,785	63.6
Democratic	Jane Westlake	1,023	36.4
Total votes		2,808	100.0
Republican hold			

=== Belknap 8 ===
- Elects one representative

Belknap 8 general election, 2020
Party	Candidate	Votes	%
Republican	Raymond Howard (incumbent)	5,441	61.1
Democratic	Ruth Larson	3,463	38.9
Total votes		8,904	100.0
Republican hold			

=== Belknap 9 ===
- Elects one representative

Republican primary

Belknap 9 Republican primary
Party	Candidate	Votes	%
Republican	Travis O'Hara	1,693	63.2
Republican	Brad Kirby	988	36.8
Total votes		2,681	100.0

General election

Belknap 9 general election, 2020
Party	Candidate	Votes	%
Republican	Travis O'Hara	6,783	55.9
Democratic	Charlie St. Clair (incumbent)	5,354	44.1
Total votes		12,137	100.0
Republican gain from Democratic			

== Carroll County ==
=== Carroll 1 ===
- Elects one representative

Carroll 1 general election, 2020
Party	Candidate	Votes	%
Democratic	Anita Burroughs (incumbent)	1,601	54.1
Republican	Ray Gilmore	1,361	45.9
Total votes		2,962	100.0
Democratic hold			

=== Carroll 2 ===
- Elects three representatives

Carroll 2 general election, 2020
Party	Candidate	Votes	%
Democratic	Stephen Woodcock (incumbent)	2,992	18.3
Democratic	Tom Buco (incumbent)	2,918	17.8
Republican	Karen Umberger	2,787	17.0
Democratic	Ellin Leonard	2,638	16.1
Republican	Frank McCarthy	2,545	15.5
Republican	Wendy Richardson	2,483	15.2
Total votes		16,363	100.0
Democratic hold			
Democratic hold			
Republican gain from Democratic			

=== Carroll 3 ===
- Elects two representatives

Carroll 3 general election, 2020
Party	Candidate	Votes	%
Republican	Mark McConkey	2,430	27.4
Democratic	Jerry Knirk (incumbent)	2,244	25.3
Democratic	Susan Ticehurst (incumbent)	2,233	25.2
Republican	Nicole Nordlund	1,967	22.2
Total votes		8,874	100.0
Republican gain from Democratic			
Democratic hold			

=== Carroll 4 ===
- Elects two representatives

Carroll 4 general election, 2020
Party	Candidate	Votes	%
Republican	Glenn Cordelli (incumbent)	3,410	29.1
Republican	Karel Crawford (incumbent)	3,345	28.5
Democratic	Caroline Nesbitt	2,577	22.0
Democratic	Chip Merrill	2,401	20.5
Total votes		11,733	100.0
Republican hold			
Republican hold			

=== Carroll 5 ===
- Elects three representatives

Carroll 5 general election, 2020
Party	Candidate	Votes	%
Republican	Lino Avellani (incumbent)	3,797	21.7
Republican	Bill Nelson (incumbent)	3,793	21.7
Republican	Jonathan Smith	3,458	19.8
Democratic	Donna Ackerman	2,334	13.4
Democratic	Patricia Pustell	2,114	12.1
Democratic	Knute Ogren	1,992	11.4
Total votes		17,488	100.0
Republican hold			
Republican hold			
Republican hold			

=== Carroll 6 ===
- Elects two representatives

Carroll 6 general election, 2020
Party	Candidate	Votes	%
Republican	John MacDonald (incumbent)	2,547	28.6
Republican	Brodie Deshaies	2,465	27.7
Democratic	Carrie Duran	1,974	22.2
Democratic	John Wall	1,908	21.5
Total votes		8,894	100.0
Republican hold			
Republican gain from Democratic			

=== Carroll 7 ===
- Elects one representative

Carroll 7 general election, 2020
Party	Candidate	Votes	%
Democratic	Chris McAleer	7,401	54.0
Republican	Norman Tregenza	6,301	46.0
Total votes		13,702	100.0
Democratic hold			

=== Carroll 8 ===
- Elects one representative

Carroll 8 general election, 2020
Party	Candidate	Votes	%
Republican	William Marsh (incumbent)	8,203	62.9
Democratic	Eve Klotz	4,832	37.1
Total votes		13,035	100.0
Republican hold			

== Cheshire County ==
=== Cheshire 1 ===
- Elects four representatives

Cheshire 1 general election, 2020
Party	Candidate	Votes	%
Democratic	Michael Abbot (incumbent)	4,066	14.8
Democratic	Lucy Weber (incumbent)	4,039	14.7
Democratic	Cathryn Harvey (incumbent)	3,935	14.3
Democratic	Paul Berch (incumbent)	3,902	14.2
Republican	Kate Day	3,044	11.1
Republican	Whitney Aldrich	2,964	10.8
Republican	Peter Benik	2,815	10.2
Republican	Rick Merkt	2,779	10.1
Total votes		27,544	100.0
Democratic hold			
Democratic hold			
Democratic hold			
Democratic hold			

=== Cheshire 2 ===
- Elects one representative

Cheshire 2 general election, 2020
Party	Candidate	Votes	%
Democratic	John Mann (incumbent)	1,169	54.4
Republican	Rich Nalevanko	982	45.6
Total votes		2,151	100.0
Democratic hold			

=== Cheshire 3 ===
- Elects one representative

Cheshire 3 general election, 2020
Party	Candidate	Votes	%
Democratic	Dan Eaton (incumbent)	1,130	53.7
Republican	Robert D'Arcy	974	46.3
Total votes		2,104	100.0
Democratic hold			

=== Cheshire 4 ===
- Elects one representative
- No other candidate filed for the seat.

Cheshire 4 general election, 2020
Party	Candidate	Votes	%
Democratic	Lawrence Welkowitz	1,213	100.0
Total votes		1,213	100.0
Democratic hold			

=== Cheshire 5 ===
- Elects one representative

Cheshire 5 general election, 2020
Party	Candidate	Votes	%
Democratic	John Bordenet (incumbent)	1,664	68.4
Republican	Marilyn Huston	768	31.6
Total votes		2,432	100.0
Democratic hold			

=== Cheshire 6 ===
- Elects one representative

Cheshire 6 general election, 2020
Party	Candidate	Votes	%
Democratic	Dru Fox	1,495	63.7
Republican	Kyle LaBrie	853	36.3
Total votes		2,348	100.0
Democratic hold			

=== Cheshire 7 ===
- Elects one representative

Cheshire 7 general election, 2020
Party	Candidate	Votes	%
Democratic	Sparky Von Plinsky (incumbent)	1,693	64.5
Republican	Robert Call	934	35.5
Total votes		2,627	100.0
Democratic hold			

=== Cheshire 8 ===
- Elects one representative
- No other candidate filed for the seat.

Cheshire 8 general election, 2020
Party	Candidate	Votes	%
Democratic	Donovan Fenton (incumbent)	2,321	100.0
Total votes		2,321	100.0
Democratic hold			

=== Cheshire 9 ===
- Elects two representatives

Cheshire 9 general election, 2020
Party	Candidate	Votes	%
Democratic	Richard Ames (incumbent)	2,651	29.5
Democratic	Douglas Ley (incumbent)	2,475	27.5
Republican	Rita Mattson	1,964	21.9
Republican	Leo Plante	1,894	21.1
Total votes		8,984	100.0
Democratic hold			
Democratic hold			

=== Cheshire 10 ===
- Elects one representative

Cheshire 10 general election, 2020
Party	Candidate	Votes	%
Democratic	Lucius Parshall	1,163	51.3
Republican	Dick Thackston	1,103	48.7
Total votes		2,266	100.0
Democratic hold			

=== Cheshire 11 ===
- Elects two representatives

Cheshire 11 general election, 2020
Party	Candidate	Votes	%
Republican	John B. Hunt (incumbent)	2,865	32.8
Republican	Jim Qualey	2,313	26.5
Democratic	Patricia Martin	1,835	21.0
Democratic	Gene Andersen	1,721	19.7
Total votes		8,734	100.0
Republican hold			
Republican hold			

=== Cheshire 12 ===
- Elects two representatives

Cheshire 12 general election, 2020
Party	Candidate	Votes	%
Democratic	Jennie Gomarlo (incumbent)	2,343	29.7
Democratic	Barry Faulkner (incumbent)	1,926	24.4
Republican	Sly Karasinski	1,836	23.3
Republican	Stephen Malone	1,776	22.5
Total votes		7,881	100.0
Democratic hold			
Democratic hold			

=== Cheshire 13 ===
- Elects one representative

Democratic primary

Cheshire 13 Democratic primary
Party	Candidate	Votes	%
Democratic	Natalie Quevedo	257	57.8
Democratic	Henry Parkhurst (incumbent)	188	42.2
Total votes		445	100.0

General election

Cheshire 13 general election, 2020
Party	Candidate	Votes	%
Republican	Ben Kilanski	994	51.5
Democratic	Natalie Quevedo	935	48.5
Total votes		1,929	100.0
Republican gain from Democratic			

=== Cheshire 14 ===
- Elects one representative

Republican primary

Cheshire 14 Republican primary
Party	Candidate	Votes	%
Republican	Matthew Santonastaso	1,063	58.9
Republican	Franklin Sterling Jr.	742	41.1
Total votes		1,805	100.0

General election

Cheshire 14 general election, 2020
Party	Candidate	Votes	%
Republican	Matthew Santonastaso	4,926	52.2
Democratic	Andrew Maneval	4,516	47.8
Total votes		9,442	100.0
Republican gain from Democratic			

=== Cheshire 15 ===
- Elects one representative

Cheshire 15 general election, 2020
Party	Candidate	Votes	%
Republican	Jennifer Rhodes	4,278	50.3
Democratic	Bruce Tatro (incumbent)	4,227	49.7
Total votes		8,505	100.0
Republican gain from Democratic			

=== Cheshire 16 ===
- Elects two representatives

Democratic primary

Cheshire 16 Democratic primary
Party	Candidate	Votes	%
Democratic	Joe Schapiro (incumbent)	1,853	37.6
Democratic	Amanda Toll	1,588	32.3
Democratic	William Pearson (incumbent)	1,077	21.9
Democratic	Ryan Meehan	405	8.2
Total votes		4,923	100.0

Republican primary

Cheshire 16 Republican primary
Party	Candidate	Votes	%
Republican	Matt Roach	425	29.9
Republican	Jerry Sickels	413	29.1
Republican	Ian Freeman	299	21.1
Republican	Varrin Swearingen	282	19.9
Total votes		1,419	100.0

General election

Cheshire 16 general election, 2020
Party	Candidate	Votes	%
Democratic	Joe Schapiro (incumbent)	7,465	35.1
Democratic	Amanda Toll	7,412	34.9
Republican	Matt Roach	3,444	16.2
Republican	Jerry Sickels	2,944	13.8
Total votes		31,265	100.0
Democratic hold			
Democratic hold			

== Coös County ==
=== Coös 1 ===
- Elects two representatives

Coös 1 general election, 2020
Party	Candidate	Votes	%
Republican	Donald Dostie	1,952	39.4
Republican	Dennis Thompson	1,370	27.7
Democratic	Bob Baker	939	19.0
Democratic	Bernice Christianson	688	13.9
Total votes			100.0
Republican hold			
Republican hold			

=== Coös 2 ===
- Elects one representative

Coös 2 general election, 2020
Party	Candidate	Votes	%
Republican	Arnold Davis	1,380	62.2
Democratic	Christopher Roberge	839	37.8
Total votes		2,219	100.0
Republican gain from Democratic			

=== Coös 3 ===
- Elects three representatives

Coös 3 general election, 2020
Party	Candidate	Votes	%
Democratic	Larry Laflamme (incumbent)	2,129	20.6
Republican	Robert Theberge	1,971	19.1
Democratic	Eamon Kelly	1,768	17.1
Democratic	Henry Noel (incumbent)	1,712	16.6
Republican	Mark Evans	1,560	15.1
Republican	Stuart Light	1,206	11.7
Total votes		10,346	100.0
Democratic hold			
Republican gain from Democratic			
Democratic hold			

=== Coös 4 ===
- Elects one representative

Coös 4 general election, 2020
Party	Candidate	Votes	%
Republican	Kevin Craig (incumbent)	1,165	53.1
Democratic	Evalyn Merrick	1,029	46.9
Total votes		2,194	100.0
Republican hold			

=== Coös 5 ===
- Elects one representative

Coös 5 general election, 2020
Party	Candidate	Votes	%
Democratic	Edith Tucker (incumbent)	1,413	52.0
Republican	John Greer	1,305	48.0
Total votes		2,718	100.0
Democratic hold			

=== Coös 6 ===
- Elects one representative
- No other candidate filed for the seat.

Coös 6 general election, 2020
Party	Candidate	Votes	%
Democratic	William Hatch (incumbent)	1,307	100.0
Total votes		1,307	100.0
Democratic hold			

=== Coös 7 ===
- Elects one representative

Coös 7 general election, 2020
Party	Candidate	Votes	%
Republican	Troy Merner (incumbent)	4,344	61.9
Democratic	Gregor Stocks	2,678	38.1
Total votes		7,022	100.0
Republican hold			

== Grafton County ==
=== Grafton 1 ===
- Elects two representatives

Grafton 1 general election, 2020
Party	Candidate	Votes	%
Democratic	Linda Massimilla (incumbent)	2,364	28.3
Republican	Joseph DePalma	2,161	25.9
Democratic	Sally Sherrard	1,951	23.3
Republican	Calvin Beaulier	1,883	22.5
Total votes		8,359	100.0
Democratic hold			
Republican hold			

=== Grafton 2 ===
- Elects one representative

Grafton 2 general election, 2020
Party	Candidate	Votes	%
Democratic	Timothy Egan (incumbent)	1,522	52.2
Republican	Robert Peraino	1,392	47.8
Total votes		2,914	100.0
Democratic hold			

=== Grafton 3 ===
- Elects one representative

Grafton 3 general election, 2020
Party	Candidate	Votes	%
Democratic	Dennis Ruprecht (incumbent) (Note: Rep. Ruprecht is the incumbent from Grafton 15.)	1,601	53.4
Republican	Wes Chapmon	1,397	46.6
Total votes		2,998	100.0
Democratic hold			

=== Grafton 4 ===
- Elects one representative

Grafton 4 general election, 2020
Party	Candidate	Votes	%
Republican	Rick Ladd (incumbent)	1,405	68.1
Democratic	Don Locasio	659	31.9
Total votes		2,064	100.0
Republican hold			

=== Grafton 5 ===
- Elects one representative

Republican primary

Grafton 5 Republican primary
Party	Candidate	Votes	%
Republican	Bonnie Ham	239	63.2
Republican	Paul Schirduan	139	36.8
Total votes		378	100.0

General election

Grafton 5 general election, 2020
Party	Candidate	Votes	%
Republican	Bonnie Ham	1,068	52.1
Democratic	Jerry Stringham (incumbent)	981	47.9
Total votes		2,049	100.0
Republican gain from Democratic			

=== Grafton 6 ===
- Elects one representative

Grafton 6 general election, 2020
Party	Candidate	Votes	%
Republican	Gail Sanborn	1,748	54.9
Democratic	Kevin Maes (incumbent)	1,437	45.1
Total votes		3,185	100.0
Republican gain from Democratic			

=== Grafton 7 ===
- Elects one representative

Democratic primary

Grafton 7 Democratic primary
Party	Candidate	Votes	%
Democratic	Richard Osborne (incumbent)	313	80.5
Democratic	Konner Bird	76	19.5
Total votes		389	100.0

General election

Grafton 7 general election, 2020
Party	Candidate	Votes	%
Republican	Mark Alliegro	1,064	51.3
Democratic	Richard Osborne (incumbent)	1,012	48.7
Total votes		2,076	100.0
Republican gain from Democratic			

=== Grafton 8 ===
- Elects three representatives

Grafton 8 general election, 2020
Party	Candidate	Votes	%
Democratic	Suzanne Smith (incumbent)	2,989	21.0
Democratic	Sallie Fellows (incumbent)	2,852	20.1
Democratic	Joyce Weston (incumbent)	2,788	19.6
Republican	Mike McLaughlin	2,024	14.2
Republican	George Kirk	1,833	12.9
Republican	Steven Benedetto	1,724	12.1
Total votes		14,210	100.0
Democratic hold			
Democratic hold			
Democratic hold			

=== Grafton 9 ===
- Elects two representatives

Republican primary

Grafton 9 Republican primary
Party	Candidate	Votes	%
Republican	Ned Gordon (incumbent)	1,175	69.7
Republican	Lex Berezhny	345	20.5
Republican	Tejasinha Sivalingam	166	9.8
Total votes		1,686	100.0

Democratic primary

Grafton 9 Democratic primary
Party	Candidate	Votes	%
Democratic	Catherine Mulholland	645	47.5
Democratic	Carolyn Fluehr-Lobban	435	32.0
Democratic	Richard Lobban Jr.	278	20.5
Total votes		1,358	100.0

General election

Grafton 9 general election, 2020
Party	Candidate	Votes	%
Republican	Ned Gordon (incumbent)	3,507	36.3
Republican	Lex Berezhny	2,316	24.0
Democratic	Catherine Mulholland	2,007	20.8
Democratic	Carolyn Fluehr-Lobban	1,826	18.9
Total votes			100.0
Republican hold			
Republican hold			

=== Grafton 10 ===
- Elects one representative
- No other candidate filed for the seat.

Grafton 10 general election, 2020
Party	Candidate	Votes	%
Democratic	Roger Dontonville (incumbent)	1,949	100.0
Total votes		1,949	100.0
Democratic hold			

=== Grafton 11 ===
- Elects one representative

Grafton 11 general election, 2020
Party	Candidate	Votes	%
Republican	Beth Folsom	1,456	51.8
Democratic	Timothy Josephson (incumbent)	1,354	48.2
Total votes		2,810	100.0
Republican gain from Democratic			

=== Grafton 12 ===
- Elects four representatives

Democratic primary

Grafton 12 Democratic primary
Party	Candidate	Votes	%
Democratic	Sharon Nordgren (incumbent)	2,094	21.3
Democratic	Russell Muirhead	1,488	15.1
Democratic	Mary Hakken-Phillips	1,272	12.9
Democratic	James Murphy	1,151	11.7
Democratic	Brittney Joyce	1,125	11.4
Democratic	Riley Gordon	976	9.9
Democratic	Orian Welling	710	7.2
Democratic	Joanna Jaspersohn	625	6.4
Democratic	Victoria Xiao	402	4.1
Total votes			100.0

General election

- No other candidate filed for the seat.

Grafton 12 general election, 2020
Party	Candidate	Votes	%
Democratic	Sharon Nordgren (incumbent)	6,311	25.4
Democratic	Russell Muirhead	6,252	25.1
Democratic	Mary Hakken-Phillips	6,228	25.0
Democratic	James Murphy	6,085	24.5
Total votes		24,876	100.0
Democratic hold			
Democratic hold			
Democratic hold			
Democratic hold			

=== Grafton 13 ===
- Elects four representatives

Grafton 13 general election, 2020
Party	Candidate	Votes	%
Democratic	Susan Almy (incumbent)	5,466	21.7
Democratic	George Sykes (incumbent)	5,352	21.2
Democratic	Laurel Stavis (incumbent)	5,122	20.3
Democratic	Richard Abel (incumbent)	5,082	20.2
Republican	Joshua Flanders	2,177	8.6
Republican	Michael Balog	1,998	7.9
Total votes		25,197	100.0
Democratic hold			
Democratic hold			
Democratic hold			
Democratic hold			

=== Grafton 14 ===
- Elects one representative

Grafton 14 general election, 2020
Party	Candidate	Votes	%
Republican	Matthew Simon	4,050	54.2
Democratic	Elaine French (incumbent)	3,420	45.8
Total votes		7,470	100.0
Republican gain from Democratic			

=== Grafton 15 ===
- Elects one representative

Republican primary

Grafton 15 Republican primary
Party	Candidate	Votes	%
Republican	David W. Binford	782	68.0
Republican	Tom Friel	368	32.0
Total votes		1,150	100.0

General election

Grafton 15 general election, 2020
Party	Candidate	Votes	%
Republican	David Binford	2,774	55.0
Democratic	Ed Rajsteter	2,268	45.0
Total votes		5,042	100.0
Republican gain from Democratic			

=== Grafton 16 ===
- Elects one representative

Grafton 16 general election, 2020
Party	Candidate	Votes	%
Republican	Jeffrey Greeson	3,018	50.9
Democratic	Francesca Diggs (incumbent)	2,914	49.1
Total votes		5,932	100.0
Republican gain from Democratic			

=== Grafton 17 ===
- Elects one representative

Grafton 17 general election, 2020
Party	Candidate	Votes	%
Democratic	Joshua Adjutant (incumbent)	4,096	50.4
Republican	Kendall Hughes	4,038	49.6
Total votes		8,134	100.0
Democratic hold			

== Hillsborough County ==
=== Hillsborough 1 ===
- Elects two representatives

Hillsborough 1 general election, 2020
Party	Candidate	Votes	%
Republican	Jim Fedolfi (incumbent)	2,458	28.0
Democratic	Marjorie Porter (incumbent)	2,229	25.4
Republican	John Valera	2,183	24.9
Democratic	Susanne White	1,914	21.8
Total votes		8,784	100.0
Republican hold			
Democratic hold			

=== Hillsborough 2 ===
- Elects three representatives

Hillsborough 2 general election, 2020
Party	Candidate	Votes	%
Republican	Keith Erf (incumbent)	3,440	21.1
Republican	Leah Cushman	3,402	20.9
Republican	Gary Hopper (incumbent)	3,285	20.2
Democratic	Jennifer Paveglio	2,443	15.0
Democratic	Robert Girard	1,881	11.6
Democratic	Rachel Cisto	1,827	11.2
Total votes		16,278	100.0
Republican hold			
Republican hold			
Republican hold			

=== Hillsborough 3 ===
- Elects one representative

Hillsborough 3 general election, 2020
Party	Candidate	Votes	%
Democratic	Dan Pickering (incumbent)	1,698	56.1
Republican	David Bedard	1,330	43.9
Total votes		3,028	100.0
Democratic hold			

=== Hillsborough 4 ===
- Elects two representatives

Hillsborough 4 general election, 2020
Party	Candidate	Votes	%
Republican	Jim Kofalt	2,675	25.7
Republican	Lisa Post	2,644	25.4
Democratic	Jennifer Bernet (incumbent)	2,627	25.2
Democratic	Kermit Williams (incumbent)	2,479	23.4
Total votes		10,425	100.0
Republican gain from Democratic			
Republican gain from Democratic			

=== Hillsborough 5 ===
- Elects two representatives

Hillsborough 5 general election, 2020
Party	Candidate	Votes	%
Republican	William Foster	2,638	25.7
Republican	Gerald Griffin	2,618	25.5
Democratic	David Woodbury (incumbent)	2,522	24.6
Democratic	Donna Mombourquette (incumbent)	2,487	24.2
Total votes		10,265	100.0
Republican gain from Democratic			
Republican gain from Democratic			

=== Hillsborough 6 ===
- Elects five representatives

Republican primary

Hillsborough 6 Republican primary
Party	Candidate	Votes	%
Republican	Barbara Griffin (incumbent)	1,043	15.4
Republican	Joe Alexander Jr. (incumbent)	993	14.6
Republican	Fred Plett (incumbent)	967	14.3
Republican	Michael Gunski (incumbent)	961	14.2
Republican	Claire Rouillard	862	12.7
Republican	Anthony Pugh	617	9.1
Republican	John Stafford	606	8.9
Republican	Frank Hobbs	497	7.3
Republican	Rick Kardos	240	3.5
Total votes		6,786	100.0

General election

Hillsborough 6 general election, 2020
Party	Candidate	Votes	%
Republican	Joe Alexander (incumbent)	4,816	11.5
Republican	Michael Gunski (incumbent)	4,721	11.3
Republican	Barbara Griffin (incumbent)	4,717	11.3
Republican	Claire Rouillard	4,434	10.6
Republican	Fred Plett (incumbent)	4,298	10.3
Democratic	Jim Craig	3,967	9.5
Democratic	Judi Lanza	3,922	9.4
Democratic	Melanie Renfrew-Hebert	3,689	8.8
Democratic	Richard Bruno	3,680	8.8
Democratic	Robin McCune	3,641	8.7
Total votes		41,885	100.0
Republican hold			
Republican hold			
Republican hold			
Republican gain from Democratic			
Republican hold			

=== Hillsborough 7 ===
- Elects six representatives

Republican primary

Hillsborough 7 Republican primary
Party	Candidate	Votes	%
Republican	Linda Gould (incumbent)	1,907	15.4
Republican	Niki Kelsey	1,852	15.0
Republican	David Danielson (incumbent)	1,680	13.6
Republican	Stephen Kenda	1,594	12.9
Republican	Ted Gorski	1,477	11.9
Republican	John Graham (incumbent)	1,456	11.8
Republican	Britton Albiston	1,342	10.8
Republican	Phil Greazzo	1,072	8.7
Total votes		12,380	100.0

General election

Hillsborough 7 general election, 2020
Party	Candidate	Votes	%
Republican	Linda Gould (incumbent)	7,241	9.7
Republican	Niki Kelsey	7,079	9.5
Republican	John Graham (incumbent)	6,907	9.3
Democratic	Sue Mullen (incumbent)	6,896	9.3
Republican	David Danielson (incumbent)	6,890	9.3
Republican	Ted Gorski	6,747	9.1
Republican	Stephen Kenda	6,370	8.6
Democratic	Daniel Dong	5,717	7.7
Democratic	Catherine Rombeau	5,488	7.4
Democratic	Shana Potvin	5,207	7.0
Democratic	Emma Paradis	5,188	7.0
Democratic	Cheri Schmitt	4,771	6.4
Total votes		74,501	100.0
Republican hold			
Republican hold			
Republican hold			
Democratic hold			
Republican hold			
Republican hold			

=== Hillsborough 8 ===
- Elects two representatives

Democratic primary

Hillsborough 8 Democratic primary
Party	Candidate	Votes	%
Democratic	Diane Langley (incumbent)	714	34.1
Democratic	Jeff Goley (incumbent)	694	33.2
Democratic	Christine Seibert	685	32.7
Total votes		2,093	100.0

General election

Hillsborough 8 general election, 2020
Party	Candidate	Votes	%
Democratic	Diane Langley (incumbent)	2,771	27.9
Democratic	Jeff Goley (incumbent)	2,757	27.8
Republican	Paul DiIulio	2,257	22.8
Republican	Dan Goldner	2,129	21.5
Total votes		9,914	100.0
Democratic hold			
Democratic hold			

=== Hillsborough 9 ===
- Elects two representatives

Hillsborough 9 general election, 2020
Party	Candidate	Votes	%
Democratic	Linda DiSilvestro (incumbent)	2,711	31.0
Democratic	Iz Piedra (incumbent)	2,292	26.3
Republican	Tyler Chase	1,925	22.0
Republican	Doug Whitfield	1,805	20.7
Total votes		8,733	100.0
Democratic hold			
Democratic hold			

=== Hillsborough 10 ===
- Elects two representatives

Democratic primary

Hillsborough 10 Democratic primary
Party	Candidate	Votes	%
Democratic	Pat Long (incumbent)	381	42.0
Democratic	Jean Jeudy (incumbent)	323	35.6
Democratic	Ron Shaw	204	22.5
Total votes		908	100.0

General election

Hillsborough 10 general election, 2020
Party	Candidate	Votes	%
Democratic	Jean Jeudy (incumbent)	1,891	38.1
Democratic	Pat Long (incumbent)	1,867	37.6
Republican	Holly Beene	1,210	24.4
Total votes		4,968	100.0
Democratic hold			
Democratic hold			

=== Hillsborough 11 ===
- Elects two representatives

Democratic primary

Hillsborough 11 Democratic primary
Party	Candidate	Votes	%
Democratic	Nicole Klein-Knight (incumbent)	411	49.3
Democratic	Donald Bouchard (incumbent)	315	37.8
Democratic	James Webb	107	12.9
Total votes		833	100.0

General election

Hillsborough 11 general election, 2020
Party	Candidate	Votes	%
Democratic	Nicole Klein-Knight (incumbent)	1,235	27.0
Democratic	Donald Bouchard (incumbent)	1,129	24.6
Republican	Richard Hagala	1,019	22.2
Republican	Jason Hodgdon	1,003	21.9
Libertarian	Robert Daniel	196	4.3
Total votes		4,582	100.0
Democratic hold			
Democratic hold			

=== Hillsborough 12 ===
- Elects two representatives

Democratic primary

Hillsborough 12 Democratic primary
Party	Candidate	Votes	%
Democratic	Amanda Bouldin (incumbent)	347	43.9
Democratic	Andrew Bouldin (incumbent)	320	40.5
Democratic	Marcus Ponce de Leon	123	15.6
Total votes		790	100.0

General election

Hillsborough 12 general election, 2020
Party	Candidate	Votes	%
Democratic	Amanda Bouldin (incumbent)	1,583	32.7
Democratic	Andrew Bouldin (incumbent)	1,435	29.7
Republican	Sharon Poisson	949	19.6
Republican	Constance Spencer	868	18.0
Total votes		4,835	100.0
Democratic hold			
Democratic hold			

=== Hillsborough 13 ===
- Elects two representatives

Hillsborough 13 general election, 2020
Party	Candidate	Votes	%
Republican	Larry Gagne (incumbent)	2,557	27.4
Republican	William Infantine	2,432	26.0
Democratic	Christy Hamilton	2,215	23.7
Democratic	Darryl Dion	2,136	22.9
Total votes		9,340	100.0
Republican hold			
Republican gain from Democratic			

=== Hillsborough 14 ===
- Elects two representatives

Hillsborough 14 general election, 2020
Party	Candidate	Votes	%
Democratic	Mary Freitas (incumbent)	1,965	30.2
Democratic	Mary Heath (incumbent)	1,726	26.6
Republican	Brian Cole	1,475	22.7
Republican	Steve Focht	1,335	20.5
Total votes		6,501	100.0
Democratic hold			
Democratic hold			

=== Hillsborough 15 ===
- Elects two representatives

Hillsborough 15 general election, 2020
Party	Candidate	Votes	%
Republican	Mark Warden (incumbent)	2,593	28.2
Democratic	Erika Conners (incumbent)	2,486	27.0
Republican	Macy McNair	2,422	26.3
Democratic	Tommy Katsiantonis	1,702	18.5
Total votes		9,203	100.0
Democratic hold			
Republican hold			

=== Hillsborough 16 ===
- Elects two representatives

Hillsborough 16 general election, 2020
Party	Candidate	Votes	%
Democratic	Barbara Shaw (incumbent)	2,330	30.6
Democratic	Joshua Query (incumbent)	1,810	23.7
Republican	Robert Kliskey	1,776	23.3
Republican	Steven Stefanik	1,704	22.4
Total votes		7,620	100.0
Democratic hold			
Democratic hold			

=== Hillsborough 17 ===
- Elects two representatives

Hillsborough 17 general election, 2020
Party	Candidate	Votes	%
Democratic	Heidi Hamer (incumbent)	2,096	28.9
Democratic	Timothy Smith (incumbent)	1,757	24.3
Republican	Tammy Simmons	1,694	23.4
Republican	Dan Garthwaite	1,692	23.4
Total votes		7,239	100.0
Democratic hold			
Democratic hold			

=== Hillsborough 18 ===
- Elects two representatives

Democratic primary

Hillsborough 18 Democratic primary
Party	Candidate	Votes	%
Democratic	Patricia Cornell (incumbent)	326	33.0
Democratic	Willis Griffith (incumbent)	314	31.8
Democratic	Sara Lachance	194	19.6
Democratic	Chloe Sowers	94	9.5
Democratic	Matthew Ping	61	6.2
Total votes		989	100.0

General election

Hillsborough 18 general election, 2020
Party	Candidate	Votes	%
Democratic	Patricia Cornell (incumbent)	1,985	32.2
Democratic	Willis Griffith (incumbent)	1,670	27.1
Republican	Brian Chicoine	1,263	20.5
Republican	Brittany LeClear-Ping	1,428	20.2
Total votes		6,346	100.0
Democratic hold			
Democratic hold			

=== Hillsborough 19 ===
- Elects two representatives

Republican primary

Hillsborough 19 Republican primary
Party	Candidate	Votes	%
Republican	Dick Marston	494	48.9
Republican	Matt Whitlock	342	33.9
Republican	Jamie Brassill	174	17.2
Total votes		1,010	100.0

General election

Hillsborough 19 general election, 2020
Party	Candidate	Votes	%
Democratic	Kendall Snow (incumbent)	2,354	28.9
Republican	Dick Marston	1,987	24.4
Democratic	William Zackeroff	1,951	24.0
Republican	Matt Whitlock	1,854	22.8
Total votes		8,146	100.0
Democratic hold			
Republican gain from Democratic			

=== Hillsborough 20 ===
- Elects two representatives

Hillsborough 20 general election, 2020
Party	Candidate	Votes	%
Republican	Rich Lascelles (incumbent)	3,174	39.8
Republican	Ralph Boehm (incumbent)	2,673	33.6
Democratic	Nikki Fordey	2,120	26.6
Total votes		7,967	100.0
Republican hold			
Republican hold			

=== Hillsborough 21 ===
- Elects eight representatives

Republican primary

Hillsborough 21 Republican primary
Party	Candidate	Votes	%
Republican	Dick Hinch (incumbent)	2,005	13.1
Republican	Jeanine Notter (incumbent)	1,979	12.9
Republican	Lindsay Tausch	1,790	11.7
Republican	Maureen Mooney	1,775	11.6
Republican	Bob Healey	1,677	10.9
Republican	Jack Balcom	1,653	10.8
Republican	Melissa Blasek	1,643	10.7
Republican	Mary Mayville	1,482	9.7
Republican	R. Brian Snow	1,358	8.8
Total votes		15,362	100.0

General election

Hillsborough 21 general election, 2020
Party	Candidate	Votes	%
Republican	Jeanine Notter (incumbent)	7,588	6.9
Republican	Dick Hinch (incumbent)	7,550	6.9
Republican	Maureen Mooney	7,303	6.7
Republican	Bob Healey	7,282	6.6
Republican	Melissa Blasek	7,073	6.4
Republican	Lindsay Tausch	7,073	6.4
Democratic	Rosemarie Rung (incumbent)	7,057	6.4
Republican	Mary Mayville	6,916	6.3
Republican	Jack Balcom	6,894	6.3
Democratic	Wendy Thomas (incumbent)	6,825	6.2
Democratic	Nancy Murphy (incumbent)	6,807	6.2
Democratic	Mackenzie Murphy	6,671	6.1
Democratic	Kathryn Stack (incumbent)	6,378	5.8
Democratic	Joe Sylvester	6,257	5.7
Democratic	Cynthia Parente	6,113	5.6
Democratic	Bryce Stack	6,021	5.5
Total votes		109,808	100.0
Republican hold			
Republican hold			
Republican hold			
Republican hold			
Republican gain from Democratic			
Republican gain from Democratic			
Democratic hold			
Republican gain from Democratic			

=== Hillsborough 22 ===
- Elects three representatives

Democratic primary

Hillsborough 22 Democratic primary
Party	Candidate	Votes	%
Democratic	Megan Murray (incumbent)	1,268	34.1
Democratic	Daniel Veilleux	919	24.7
Democratic	Tony Labranche	805	21.7
Democratic	Theresa Cheslock	723	19.5
Total votes		3,715	100.0

Republican primary

Hillsborough 22 Republican primary
Party	Candidate	Votes	%
Republican	Peter Hansen	947	30.1
Republican	Pamela Coughlin	813	25.9
Republican	Danielle Pray	741	23.6
Republican	Peter Maresco	642	20.4
Total votes		3,143	100.0

General election

Hillsborough 22 general election, 2020
Party	Candidate	Votes	%
Democratic	Megan Murray (incumbent)	4,012	18.6
Democratic	Daniel Veilleux	3,658	16.9
Democratic	Tony Labranche	3,641	16.8
Republican	Peter Hansen	3,567	16.5
Republican	Danielle Pray	3,395	15.7
Republican	Pamela Coughlin	3,339	15.5
Total votes		21,612	100.0
Democratic hold			
Democratic hold			
Democratic gain from Republican			

=== Hillsborough 23 ===
- Elects four representatives

Hillsborough 23 general election, 2020
Party	Candidate	Votes	%
Democratic	Peter Petrigno (incumbent)	4,051	13.7
Republican	Bill King	3,954	13.4
Republican	Vanessa Sheehan	3,861	13.1
Democratic	Maria Perez	3,822	12.9
Republican	Michael Thornton	3,680	12.5
Democratic	Alexander Lloyd	3,408	11.5
Democratic	Herb Salmon	3,388	11.5
Republican	S. Tango Tourangeau	3,373	11.4
Total votes		29,537	100.0
Democratic hold			
Republican hold			
Republican gain from Democratic			
Democratic hold			

=== Hillsborough 24 ===
- Elects two representatives

Democratic primary

Hillsborough 24 Democratic primary
Party	Candidate	Votes	%
Democratic	Ivy Vann (incumbent)	1,032	42.3
Democratic	Peter Leishman (incumbent)	1,005	41.2
Democratic	Judy Ferstenberg	401	16.5
Total votes		2,438	100.0

General election

Hillsborough 24 general election, 2020
Party	Candidate	Votes	%
Democratic	Peter Leishman (incumbent)	2,732	34.7
Democratic	Ivy Vann (incumbent)	2,604	33.1
Republican	Christopher Maidment	1,361	17.3
Republican	David Pilcher	1,171	14.9
Total votes		7,868	100.0
Democratic hold			
Democratic hold			

=== Hillsborough 25 ===
- Elects two representatives

Hillsborough 25 general election, 2020
Party	Candidate	Votes	%
Republican	Diane Kelley	2,420	30.6
Republican	Paul Somero (incumbent)	2,401	30.3
Democratic	Laura Lynch	1,563	19.7
Democratic	Elizabeth Crooker	1,536	19.4
Total votes		7,920	100.0
Republican hold			
Republican hold			

=== Hillsborough 26 ===
- Elects two representatives

Republican primary

Hillsborough 26 Republican primary
Party	Candidate	Votes	%
Republican	Diane Pauer	622	41.2
Republican	John Lewicke	568	37.7
Republican	Edward Arnold	318	21.1
Total votes		1,508	100.0

General election

Hillsborough 26 general election, 2020
Party	Candidate	Votes	%
Republican	John Lewicke	2,254	27.8
Republican	Diane Pauer	2,221	27.4
Democratic	Chris Wheeler	1,823	22.5
Democratic	Brian Rater	1,805	22.3
Total votes		8,103	100.0
Republican hold			
Republican gain from Democratic			

=== Hillsborough 27 ===
- Elects two representatives

Democratic primary

Hillsborough 27 Democratic primary
Party	Candidate	Votes	%
Democratic	Kat McGhee (incumbent) (Note: Rep. McGhee is the incumbent for Hillsborough 40.)	867	51.0
Democratic	Tom Harris	635	37.4
Democratic	Teagan Hudzik	197	11.6
Total votes		1,699	100.0

Republican primary

Hillsborough 27 Republican primary
Party	Candidate	Votes	%
Republican	David Werner	663	45.1
Republican	Susan Homola	615	41.8
Republican	Paul Romsky	191	13.0
Total votes		1,469	100.0

General election

Hillsborough 27 general election, 2020
Party	Candidate	Votes	%
Republican	Susan Homola	2,728	25.9
Democratic	Kat McGhee (incumbent)	2,686	25.5
Republican	David Werner	2,589	24.6
Democratic	Tom Harris	2,524	24.0
Total votes		10,527	100.0
Republican hold			
Democratic hold			

=== Hillsborough 28 ===
- Elects three representatives

Hillsborough 28 general election, 2020
Party	Candidate	Votes	%
Democratic	Jan Schmidt (incumbent)	2,922	18.6
Democratic	Bruce Cohen (incumbent)	2,720	17.3
Republican	Tom Lanzara	2,642	16.9
Democratic	William Bordy (incumbent)	2,566	16.4
Republican	Elizabeth Ferreira	2,479	15.8
Republican	Rosemary Russell	2,353	15.0
Total votes		13,329	100.0
Democratic hold			
Democratic hold			
Republican gain from Democratic			

=== Hillsborough 29 ===
- Elects three representatives

Hillsborough 29 general election, 2020
Party	Candidate	Votes	%
Democratic	Sue Newman (incumbent)	2,560	19.4
Democratic	Paul Bergeron (incumbent)	2,538	19.2
Democratic	Ray Newman (incumbent)	2,377	18.0
Republican	Michael McCarthy	1,938	14.7
Republican	Julie Smith	1,918	14.5
Republican	Brian Mercer	1,893	14.3
Total votes		13,224	100.0
Democratic hold			
Democratic hold			
Democratic hold			

=== Hillsborough 30 ===
- Elects three representatives

Republican primary

Hillsborough 30 Republican primary
Party	Candidate	Votes	%
Republican	David Schoneman	503	36.0
Republican	Howard Coffman	327	23.4
Republican	Doris Hohensee	294	21.1
Republican	Amanda Reichert	273	19.5
Total votes		1,397	100.0

General election

Hillsborough 30 general election, 2020
Party	Candidate	Votes	%
Democratic	Patricia Klee (incumbent)	2,661	20.5
Democratic	Suzanne Vail (incumbent)	2,567	19.7
Democratic	Sherry Dutzy (incumbent)	2,437	18.7
Republican	David Schoneman	1,951	15.0
Republican	Doris Hohensee	1,713	13.2
Republican	Howard Coffman	1,685	12.9
Total votes		13,014	100.0
Democratic hold			
Democratic hold			
Democratic hold			

=== Hillsborough 31 ===
- Elects three representatives

Democratic primary

Hillsborough 31 Democratic primary
Party	Candidate	Votes	%
Democratic	David Cote (incumbent)	307	29.2
Democratic	Manny Espitia (incumbent)	292	27.7
Democratic	Stacie-Marie Laughton	247	23.5
Democratic	Fred Davis Jr. (incumbent)	207	19.7
Total votes		1,053	100.0

General election

Hillsborough 31 general election, 2020
Party	Candidate	Votes	%
Democratic	David Cote (incumbent)	1,698	21.2
Democratic	Manny Espitia (incumbent)	1,665	20.7
Democratic	Stacie-Marie Laughton	1,611	20.1
Republican	Ryan Terrell	1,221	15.2
Republican	Elizabeth van Twuyver	996	12.4
Republican	Joost Baumeister	839	10.4
Total votes		8,030	100.0
Democratic hold			
Democratic hold			
Democratic hold			

=== Hillsborough 32 ===
- Elects three representatives

Hillsborough 32 general election, 2020
Party	Candidate	Votes	%
Democratic	Dan Toomey (incumbent)	2,915	18.5
Democratic	Allison Nutting-Wong (incumbent)	2,774	17.6
Democratic	Michael Pedersen (incumbent)	2,750	17.5
Republican	Paula Johnson	2,637	16.8
Republican	Joseph Cole	2,370	15.1
Republican	Di Lathrop	2,284	14.5
Total votes		15,730	100.0
Democratic hold			
Democratic hold			
Democratic hold			

=== Hillsborough 33 ===
- Elects three representatives

Democratic primary

Hillsborough 33 Democratic primary
Party	Candidate	Votes	%
Democratic	Fran Nutter-Upham (incumbent)	423	28.3
Democratic	Efstathia Booras	415	27.8
Democratic	Mark King (incumbent)	351	23.5
Democratic	Ken N. Gidge (incumbent)	305	20.4
Total votes		1,494	100.0

General election

Hillsborough 33 general election, 2020
Party	Candidate	Votes	%
Democratic	Mark King (incumbent)	2,050	19.9
Democratic	Fran Nutter-Upham (incumbent)	1,887	18.3
Democratic	Efstathia Booras	1,866	18.1
Republican	Kevin Scully	1,679	16.3
Republican	Teresa Scully	1,474	14.3
Republican	Edward Decatur	1,361	13.2
Total votes		10,317	100.0
Democratic hold			
Democratic hold			
Democratic hold			

=== Hillsborough 34 ===
- Elects three representatives

Hillsborough 34 general election, 2020
Party	Candidate	Votes	%
Democratic	Deb Stevens (incumbent)	1,995	19.0
Democratic	Catherine Sofikitis (incumbent)	1,979	18.8
Democratic	Melbourne Moran	1,791	16.8
Republican	Charlie Hall	1,760	16.8
Republican	Dee Hogan	1,517	14.4
Republican	Jacqueline Casey	1,498	14.3
Total votes		10,540	100.0
Democratic hold			
Democratic hold			
Democratic hold			

=== Hillsborough 35 ===
- Elects three representatives

Hillsborough 35 general election, 2020
Party	Candidate	Votes	%
Democratic	Laura Telerski (incumbent)	2,847	20.4
Democratic	Latha Mangipudi (incumbent)	2,843	20.4
Democratic	Skip Cleaver (incumbent)	2,630	18.9
Republican	Peter Silva	2,013	14.4
Republican	Anthony DiPaolo	1,841	13.2
Republican	Paul Hutsteiner	1,761	12.6
Total votes		13,935	100.0
Democratic hold			
Democratic hold			
Democratic hold			

=== Hillsborough 36 ===
- Elects three representatives

Republican primary

Hillsborough 36 Republican primary
Party	Candidate	Votes	%
Republican	Bill Ohm	528	28.1
Republican	Bill O'Brien	502	26.8
Republican	Tyler Gouveia	453	24.2
Republican	Paula Desjardins	393	21.0
Total votes		1,876	100.0

General election

Hillsborough 36 general election, 2020
Party	Candidate	Votes	%
Democratic	Michael O'Brien (incumbent)	2,734	18.8
Democratic	Linda Harriott-Gathright (incumbent)	2,685	18.5
Democratic	Marty Jack (incumbent)	2,601	17.9
Republican	Bill Ohm	2,272	15.6
Republican	Bill O'Brien	2,187	15.0
Republican	Tyler Gouveia	2,061	14.2
Total votes		14,540	100.0
Democratic hold			
Democratic hold			
Democratic hold			

=== Hillsborough 37 ===
- Elects eleven representatives

Republican primary

Hillsborough 37 Republican primary
Party	Candidate	Votes	%
Republican	Bob Greene (incumbent)	2,917	9.9
Republican	Lynne Ober (incumbent)	2,780	9.4
Republican	Russell Ober (incumbent)	2,690	9.1
Republican	Kim Rice (incumbent)	2,612	8.9
Republican	Hershel Nunez (incumbent)	2,535	8.6
Republican	Jordan Ulery (incumbent)	2,517	8.6
Republican	Alicia Lekas (incumbent)	2,484	8.4
Republican	Tony Lekas (incumbent)	2,460	8.4
Republican	Andrew Renzullo (incumbent)	2,435	8.3
Republican	Andrew Prout (incumbent)	2,374	8.1
Republican	Denise Smith	2,271	7.7
Republican	Louis Alciere	1,379	4.7
Total votes		29,454	100.0

General election

Hillsborough 37 general election, 2020
Party	Candidate	Votes	%
Republican	Lynne Ober (incumbent)	11,983	6.3
Republican	Kim Rice (incumbent)	11,274	5.9
Republican	Russell Ober (incumbent)	11,220	5.8
Republican	Tony Lekas (incumbent)	10,582	5.5
Republican	Bob Greene (incumbent)	10,487	5.5
Republican	Alicia Lekas (incumbent)	10,335	5.4
Republican	Denise Smith	10,196	5.3
Republican	Jordan Ulery (incumbent)	10,153	5.3
Republican	Hershel Nunez (incumbent)	10,146	5.3
Republican	Andrew Prout (incumbent)	10,061	5.2
Republican	Andrew Renzullo (incumbent)	10,029	5.2
Democratic	David Hennessey	7,579	3.9
Democratic	Brett Gagnon	7,524	3.9
Democratic	Barbara Blue	7,189	3.7
Democratic	Nancy Brucker	6,948	3.6
Democratic	Steven Katsos	6,932	3.6
Democratic	Hal Lynde	6,765	3.5
Democratic	Lana Paliy	6,683	3.5
Democratic	Robert Sherman	6,658	3.5
Democratic	Alejandro Urrutia	6,497	3.4
Democratic	Timothy Wyatt	6,236	3.2
Democratic	Beatriz Jauregui	6,233	3.2
Total votes		191,710	100.0
Republican hold			
Republican hold			
Republican hold			
Republican hold			
Republican hold			
Republican hold			
Republican hold			
Republican hold			
Republican hold			
Republican hold			
Republican hold			

=== Hillsborough 38 ===
- Elects two representatives

Hillsborough 38 general election, 2020
Party	Candidate	Votes	%
Republican	Jim Creighton	6,520	26.5
Democratic	Stephanie Hyland	6,161	25.0
Republican	Riche Colcombe	6,091	24.7
Democratic	James Bosman (incumbent)	5,851	23.8
Total votes		24,623	100.0
Democratic hold			
Republican gain from Democratic			

=== Hillsborough 39 ===
- Elects one representative

Hillsborough 39 general election, 2020
Party	Candidate	Votes	%
Republican	John Burt (incumbent)	9,104	57.9
Democratic	Gary Evans	6,619	42.1
Total votes		15,723	100.0
Republican hold			

=== Hillsborough 40 ===
- Elects one representative

Hillsborough 40 general election, 2020
Party	Candidate	Votes	%
Republican	Keith Ammon	10,160	52.1
Democratic	Ben Ming	9,339	47.9
Total votes			100.0
Republican gain from Democratic			

=== Hillsborough 41 ===
- Elects one representative

Hillsborough 41 general election, 2020
Party	Candidate	Votes	%
Republican	Laurie Sanborn (incumbent)	11,271	52.0
Democratic	Lisa Nash	10,399	48.0
Total votes		21,670	100.0
Republican hold			

=== Hillsborough 42 ===
- Elects two representatives

Hillsborough 42 general election, 2020
Party	Candidate	Votes	%
Democratic	Jacqueline Chretien (incumbent)	7,438	31.0
Democratic	Matt Wilhelm (incumbent)	6,608	27.5
Republican	Phillip Harris	5,108	21.3
Republican	Julie Senneville	4,845	20.2
Total votes			100.0
Democratic hold			
Democratic hold			

=== Hillsborough 43 ===
- Elects three representatives

Democratic primary

Hillsborough 43 Democratic primary
Party	Candidate	Votes	%
Democratic	Amy Bradley	1,565	29.9
Democratic	Chris Herbert (incumbent)	1,332	25.5
Democratic	Benjamin Baroody (incumbent)	1,225	23.4
Democratic	Marcella Termini	1,105	21.1
Total votes		5,227	100.0

General election

Hillsborough 43 general election, 2020
Party	Candidate	Votes	%
Democratic	Amy Bradley	6,859	19.2
Democratic	Chris Herbert (incumbent)	6,304	17.7
Republican	Joseph Lachance	5,928	16.6
Democratic	Benjamin Baroody (incumbent)	5,795	16.3
Republican	Lisa Freeman	5,761	16.2
Republican	Kirk McConnvile	5,000	14.0
Total votes		35,647	100.0
Democratic hold			
Democratic hold			
Republican gain from Democratic			

=== Hillsborough 44 ===
- Elects two representatives

Hillsborough 44 general election, 2020
Party	Candidate	Votes	%
Republican	Mark McLean (incumbent)	7,028	27.7
Republican	Ross Berry	6,847	27.0
Democratic	Candace Moulton	6,150	24.2
Democratic	Robert Curran	5,375	21.2
Total votes			100.0
Republican hold			
Republican hold			

=== Hillsborough 45 ===
- Elects two representatives

Democratic primary

Hillsborough 45 Democratic primary
Party	Candidate	Votes	%
Democratic	Jane Beaulieu (incumbent)	1,294	41.3
Democratic	Connie Van Houten (incumbent)	1,166	37.2
Democratic	Mary Lemay	673	21.5
Total votes		3,133	100.0

General election

Hillsborough 45 general election, 2020
Party	Candidate	Votes	%
Democratic	Jane Beaulieu (incumbent)	6,137	28.7
Democratic	Connie Van Houten (incumbent)	5,423	25.3
Republican	Amanda Higgins	4,942	23.1
Republican	Carlos Gonzalez	4,891	22.9
Total votes		21,393	100.0
Democratic hold			
Democratic hold			

== Merrimack County ==
=== Merrimack 1 ===
- Elects one representative

Merrimack 1 general election, 2020
Party	Candidate	Votes	%
Republican	Louise Andrus	1,679	53.9
Democratic	Ken Wells (incumbent)	1,436	46.1
Total votes		3,115	100.0
Republican gain from Democratic			

=== Merrimack 2 ===
- Elects two representatives

Republican primary

Merrimack 2 Republican primary
Party	Candidate	Votes	%
Republican	Dave Testerman (incumbent)	465	46.9
Republican	James Mason	287	29.0
Republican	Christopher Gronski	239	24.1
Total votes		991	100.0

General election

Merrimack 2 general election, 2020
Party	Candidate	Votes	%
Republican	Dave Testerman (incumbent)	1,575	29.1
Republican	James Mason	1,568	29.0
Democratic	Scott Burns	1,226	22.7
Democratic	Terry Smith	1,041	19.2
Total votes		5,410	100.0
Republican hold			
Republican hold			

=== Merrimack 3 ===
- Elects two representatives

Merrimack 3 general election, 2020
Party	Candidate	Votes	%
Republican	Greg Hill (incumbent)	2,121	29.2
Republican	Kenna Cross	1,980	27.2
Democratic	Sheena Duncan	1,613	22.2
Democratic	Joyce Fulweiler (incumbent)	1,555	21.4
Total votes		7,269	100.0
Republican hold			
Republican gain from Democratic			

=== Merrimack 4 ===
- Elects one representative

Merrimack 4 general election, 2020
Party	Candidate	Votes	%
Democratic	Tom Schamberg (incumbent)	1,239	55.0
Republican	Victor Prieto	1,014	45.0
Total votes		2,253	100.0
Democratic hold			

=== Merrimack 5 ===
- Elects two representatives

Merrimack 5 general election, 2020
Party	Candidate	Votes	%
Democratic	Karen Ebel (incumbent)	2,514	28.6
Republican	Dan Wolf (incumbent)	2,354	26.8
Democratic	Karen Zurheide	2,202	25.1
Republican	Roger Richard	1,716	19.5
Total votes		8,786	100.0
Democratic hold			
Republican hold			

=== Merrimack 6 ===
- Elects two representatives

Merrimack 6 general election, 2020
Party	Candidate	Votes	%
Democratic	Tony Caplan	1,915	28.1
Democratic	Rod Pimentel (incumbent)	1,880	27.6
Republican	Thomas Dunne Jr.	1,545	22.7
Republican	James Parker	1,469	21.6
Total votes		6,809	100.0
Democratic hold			
Democratic hold			

=== Merrimack 7 ===
- Elects one representative

Merrimack 7 general election, 2020
Party	Candidate	Votes	%
Republican	Margaret Kennedy	1,566	51.4
Democratic	Clyde Carson (incumbent)	1,479	48.6
Total votes		3,045	100.0
Republican gain from Democratic			

=== Merrimack 8 ===
- Elects one representative

Merrimack 8 general election, 2020
Party	Candidate	Votes	%
Democratic	Caroletta Alicea	882	47.1
Republican	Robert Forsythe (incumbent)	695	37.1
Independent	Rick Devoid (write-in)	296	15.8
Total votes		1,873	100.0
Democratic gain from Republican			

=== Merrimack 9 ===
- Elects two representatives

Democratic primary

Merrimack 9 Democratic primary
Party	Candidate	Votes	%
Democratic	Leslie Bergevin	640	41.9
Democratic	Lois Frederich	634	41.5
Democratic	Jim O'Neill	254	16.6
Total votes		1,528	100.0

General election

Merrimack 9 general election, 2020
Party	Candidate	Votes	%
Republican	Michael Moffett	2,924	30.8
Republican	Jose Cambrils	2,457	25.9
Democratic	Leslie Bergevin	2,153	22.7
Democratic	Lois Frederich	1,964	20.7
Total votes		9,498	100.0
Republican gain from Democratic			
Republican gain from Democratic			

=== Merrimack 10 ===
- Elects three representatives

Democratic primary

Merrimack 10 Democratic primary
Party	Candidate	Votes	%
Democratic	Mary Jane Wallner (incumbent)	2,098	34.5
Democratic	David Luneau (incumbent)	1,825	30.0
Democratic	Mel Myner (incumbent)	1,725	28.3
Democratic	Joel Prescott	436	7.2
Total votes		6,084	100.0

General election

Merrimack 10 general election, 2020
Party	Candidate	Votes	%
Democratic	Mary Jane Wallner (incumbent)	4,233	23.2
Democratic	David Luneau (incumbent)	4,099	22.4
Democratic	Mel Myner (incumbent)	4,005	21.9
Republican	Pamela Ean	2,098	11.5
Republican	John French	2,049	11.2
Republican	Alexandros Dellas	1,788	9.8
Total votes		18,272	100.0
Democratic hold			
Democratic hold			
Democratic hold			

=== Merrimack 11 ===
- Elects one representative

Merrimack 11 general election, 2020
Party	Candidate	Votes	%
Democratic	Steve Shurtleff (incumbent)	1,503	61.2
Republican	David Newell	955	38.8
Total votes		2,458	100.0
Democratic hold			

=== Merrimack 12 ===
- Elects one representative

Merrimack 12 general election, 2020
Party	Candidate	Votes	%
Democratic	Connie Lane (incumbent)	1,200	55.0
Republican	Patrice Myers	984	45.0
Total votes		2,184	100.0
Democratic hold			

=== Merrimack 13 ===
- Elects one representative

Merrimack 13 general election, 2020
Party	Candidate	Votes	%
Democratic	Beth Richards (incumbent)	1,091	65.7
Republican	Samuel Bahuma	570	34.3
Total votes		1,661	100.0
Democratic hold			

=== Merrimack 14 ===
- Elects one representative

Democratic primary

Merrimack 14 Democratic primary
Party	Candidate	Votes	%
Democratic	Jim MacKay (incumbent)	535	85.5
Democratic	Roy Schweiker	91	14.5
Total votes		626	100.0

General election

Merrimack 14 general election, 2020
Party	Candidate	Votes	%
Democratic	Jim MacKay (incumbent)	1,431	70.7
Republican	Donna Davey	594	29.3
Total votes		2,025	100.0
Democratic hold			

=== Merrimack 15 ===
- Elects one representative

Merrimack 15 general election, 2020
Party	Candidate	Votes	%
Democratic	Eric Gallager	1,227	65.9
Republican	Michelle McCartney	636	34.1
Total votes		1,863	100.0
Democratic hold			

=== Merrimack 16 ===
- Elects one representative

Merrimack 16 general election, 2020
Party	Candidate	Votes	%
Democratic	Timothy Soucy (incumbent)	1,716	67.1
Republican	Bob Bertrand	843	32.9
Total votes		2,559	100.0
Democratic hold			

=== Merrimack 17 ===
- Elects one representative

Merrimack 17 general election, 2020
Party	Candidate	Votes	%
Democratic	Safiya Wazir (incumbent)	1,209	54.3
Republican	Dennis Soucy	1,016	45.7
Total votes		2,225	100.0
Democratic hold			

=== Merrimack 18 ===
- Elects one representative

Merrimack 18 general election, 2020
Party	Candidate	Votes	%
Democratic	Kris Schultz (incumbent)	1,144	63.8
Republican	Claude Bongambe	650	31.2
Total votes		1,794	100.0
Democratic hold			

=== Merrimack 19 ===
- Elects one representative

Merrimack 19 general election, 2020
Party	Candidate	Votes	%
Democratic	Christy Bartlett (incumbent)	1,792	60.1
Republican	Jonathan Cate	1,147	39.9
Total votes		2,939	100.0
Democratic hold			

=== Merrimack 20 ===
- Elects three representatives

Merrimack 20 general election, 2020
Party	Candidate	Votes	%
Republican	Brian Seaworth (incumbent)	3,046	18.7
Democratic	Dianne Schuett (incumbent)	2,735	16.8
Republican	Nick White	2,656	16.3
Democratic	David Doherty (incumbent)	2,636	16.2
Republican	Peter Gagyi	2,475	15.2
Democratic	Clinton Hanson Jr.	2,439	15.0
Total votes		16,254	100.0
Republican hold			
Democratic hold			
Republican gain from Democratic			

=== Merrimack 21 ===
- Elects two representatives

Merrimack 21 general election, 2020
Party	Candidate	Votes	%
Republican	James Allard (incumbent)	2,761	32.1
Republican	John Klose (incumbent)	2,579	29.9
Democratic	Mary Frambach	1,715	19.9
Democratic	Hugh Curley	1,560	18.1
Total votes		8,615	100.0
Republican hold			
Republican hold			

=== Merrimack 22 ===
- Elects one representative

Merrimack 22 general election, 2020
Party	Candidate	Votes	%
Republican	Matthew Pitaro	1,190	54.3
Democratic	David Coolidge	1,003	45.7
Total votes		2,193	100.0
Republican gain from Democratic			

=== Merrimack 23 ===
- Elects three representatives

Democratic primary

Merrimack 23 Democratic primary
Party	Candidate	Votes	%
Democratic	Mary Beth Walz (incumbent)	1,368	32.4
Democratic	Samantha Fox (incumbent)	1,130	26.8
Democratic	Gary Woods (incumbent)	1,116	26.4
Democratic	Sally Wuellenweber	605	14.3
Total votes		4,219	100.0

General election

Merrimack 23 general election, 2020
Party	Candidate	Votes	%
Democratic	Mary Beth Walz (incumbent)	3,670	17.9
Democratic	Gary Woods (incumbent)	3,648	17.8
Democratic	Samantha Fox (incumbent)	3,526	17.2
Republican	John Martin	3,292	16.1
Republican	Raymond Plante	3,255	15.9
Republican	Mariya Markova	3,063	15.0
Total votes		20,454	100.0
Democratic hold			
Democratic hold			
Democratic hold			

=== Merrimack 24 ===
- Elects four representatives

Merrimack 24 general election, 2020
Party	Candidate	Votes	%
Republican	Thomas Walsh (incumbent)	4,331	16.1
Republican	John Leavitt	4,154	15.5
Republican	Michael Yakubovich (incumbent)	4,109	15.3
Republican	Stephen Boyd	4,085	15.2
Democratic	Kathleen Martins (incumbent)	3,915	14.6
Democratic	Harry Kozlowski	3,269	12.2
Democratic	Madalasa Gurung	2,985	11.1
Total votes		26,848	100.0
Republican hold			
Republican hold			
Republican hold			
Republican gain from Democratic			

=== Merrimack 25 ===
- Elects one representative

Merrimack 25 general election, 2020
Party	Candidate	Votes	%
Republican	Natalie Wells	3,247	52.8
Democratic	Faith Minton	2,902	47.2
Total votes		6,149	100.0
Republican gain from Democratic			

=== Merrimack 26 ===
- Elects one representative

Democratic primary

Merrimack 26 Democratic primary
Party	Candidate	Votes	%
Democratic	Lorrie Carey	1,436	73.7
Democratic	Matthew Murphy	512	26.3
Total votes		1,948	100.0

General election

Merrimack 26 general election, 2020
Party	Candidate	Votes	%
Republican	Howard Pearl (incumbent)	6,128	55.5
Democratic	Lorrie Carey	4,923	44.5
Total votes		11,051	100.0
Republican hold			

=== Merrimack 27 ===
- Elects two representatives

Merrimack 27 general election, 2020
Party	Candidate	Votes	%
Democratic	Rebecca McWilliams (incumbent)	7,605	33.6
Democratic	Art Ellison (incumbent)	7,113	31.4
Republican	Mike Visconti	4,221	18.6
Republican	Japhet Stevens	3,730	16.4
Total votes		22,669	100.0
Democratic hold			
Democratic hold			

=== Merrimack 28 ===
- Elects one representative

Merrimack 28 general election, 2020
Party	Candidate	Votes	%
Democratic	Katherine Rogers (incumbent)	4,105	57.1
Republican	Andrew Georgevits	3,016	42.9
Total votes		7,121	100.0
Democratic hold			

=== Merrimack 29 ===
- Elects one representative

Merrimack 29 general election, 2020
Party	Candidate	Votes	%
Republican	Carol McGuire (incumbent)	4,208	60.17
Democratic	Miriam Cahill-Yeaton	2,786	39.83
Total votes		6,994	100.0

== Rockingham County ==
=== Rockingham 1 ===
- Elects one representative

Republican primary

Rockingham 1 Republican primary
Party	Candidate	Votes	%
Republican	Paul Tudor	275	57.5
Republican	Brian Stone	203	42.5
Total votes		478	100.0

General election

Rockingham 1 general election, 2020
Party	Candidate	Votes	%
Republican	Paul Tudor	1,539	55.8
Democratic	Tom Chase	1,221	44.2
Total votes		2,760	100.0
Republican gain from Democratic			

=== Rockingham 2 ===
- Elects three representatives

Rockingham 2 general election, 2020
Party	Candidate	Votes	%
Republican	Kevin Verville (incumbent)	4,669	19.5
Republican	James Spillane (incumbent)	4,521	18.9
Republican	Alan Bershtein (incumbent)	4,155	17.4
Democratic	Jocelyn Messier	3,905	16.3
Democratic	Richard Boisvert	3,521	14.7
Democratic	Avis Rosenfield	3,135	13.1
Total votes		23,906	100.0
Republican hold			
Republican hold			
Republican hold			

=== Rockingham 3 ===
- Elects three representatives

Rockingham 3 general election, 2020
Party	Candidate	Votes	%
Republican	Kevin Pratt (incumbent)	3,661	24.4
Republican	Dustin Dodge	2,943	19.6
Republican	Paul Ayer	2,879	19.2
Democratic	Michael DiTommaso	1,926	12.9
Democratic	Diane Kolifrath	1,823	12.2
Democratic	Dennis Garnham	1,745	11.6
Total votes		14,977	100.0
Republican hold			
Republican hold			
Republican hold			

=== Rockingham 4 ===
- Elects five representatives

Republican primary

Rockingham 4 Republican primary
Party	Candidate	Votes	%
Republican	Jason Osborne (incumbent)	1,972	19.4
Republican	Jess Edwards (incumbent)	1,953	19.2
Republican	Chris True (incumbent)	1,861	18.3
Republican	Tony Piemonte (incumbent)	1,823	18.0
Republican	Oliver Ford	1,293	12.7
Republican	Christopher Collins	1,247	12.3
Total votes		10,149	100.0

General election

Rockingham 4 general election, 2020
Party	Candidate	Votes	%
Republican	Jess Edwards (incumbent)	6,686	14.0
Republican	Chris True (incumbent)	6,330	13.3
Republican	Jason Osborne (incumbent)	6,235	13.1
Republican	Tony Piemonte (incumbent)	5,982	12.6
Republican	Oliver Ford	5,966	12.5
Democratic	Michael D'Angelo	3,533	7.4
Democratic	Jane Van Zandt	3,441	7.2
Democratic	Matthew Krohn	3,178	6.7
Democratic	Ben Geiger	3,162	6.6
Democratic	Russ Norman	3,158	6.6
Total votes		47,671	100.0
Republican hold			
Republican hold			
Republican hold			
Republican hold			
Republican hold			

=== Rockingham 5 ===
- Elects seven representatives

Rockingham 5 general election, 2020
Party	Candidate	Votes	%
Republican	Tom Dolan (incumbent)	7,759	8.4
Republican	David Lundgren (incumbent)	7,755	8.4
Republican	Al Baldasaro (incumbent)	7,681	8.3
Republican	Betsy McKinney (incumbent)	7,610	8.2
Republican	Doug Thomas (incumbent)	7,103	7.7
Republican	Sherman Packard (incumbent)	6,976	7.5
Republican	Wayne MacDonald	6,762	7.3
Democratic	Anne Warner (incumbent)	6,350	6.9
Democratic	Ted Combes	6,293	6.8
Democratic	Martha Smith	6,000	6.5
Democratic	Robin Skudlarek	5,765	6.2
Democratic	Luisa Piette	5,680	6.1
Democratic	Paul Skudlarek	5,495	5.9
Democratic	Mack Leathurby	5,291	5.7
Total votes		92,520	100.0
Republican hold			
Republican hold			
Republican hold			
Republican hold			
Republican hold			
Republican hold			
Republican gain from Democratic			

=== Rockingham 6 ===
- Elects ten representatives

Republican primary

Rockingham 6 Republican primary
Party	Candidate	Votes	%
Republican	David Love (incumbent)	2,238	10.8
Republican	John Potucek (incumbent)	1,664	8.1
Republican	Erica Layon	1,647	8.0
Republican	Katherine O'Brien (incumbent)	1,580	7.7
Republican	Phyllis Katsakiores (incumbent)	1,539	7.5
Republican	Anne Copp	1,523	7.4
Republican	Stephen Pearson (incumbent)	1,440	7.0
Republican	Dave Milz (incumbent)	1,421	6.9
Republican	Mary Ann Kimball	1,362	6.6
Republican	Richard Tripp	1,336	6.5
Republican	Thomas Cardon	1,308	6.3
Republican	Rebecca Nevin	1,241	6.0
Republican	Lauren LaMarsh	1,185	5.7
Republican	Lorraine Lindenberg	1,135	5.5
Total votes		20,619	100.0

General election

Rockingham 6 general election, 2020
Party	Candidate	Votes	%
Republican	David Love (incumbent)	8,134	6.1
Republican	Phyllis Katsakiores (incumbent)	7,812	5.9
Republican	Richard Tripp	7,727	5.8
Republican	Anne Copp	7,440	5.6
Republican	Erica Layon	7,404	5.6
Republican	Katherine O'Brien (incumbent)	7,392	5.5
Republican	Mary Ann Kimball	7,348	5.5
Republican	John Potucek (incumbent)	7,266	5.5
Republican	Dave Milz (incumbent)	7,171	5.4
Republican	Stephen Pearson (incumbent)	7,169	5.4
Democratic	Mary Eisner (incumbent)	6,337	4.8
Democratic	Mary Till	5,943	4.5
Democratic	Erin Spencer	5,648	4.2
Democratic	Amy Dattner-Levy	5,602	4.2
Democratic	Paul Doolittle	5,591	4.2
Democratic	Thomas Wood	5,534	4.2
Democratic	Michelle Sawyer-Moge	5,482	4.1
Democratic	Beatrice Vargas	5,371	4.0
Democratic	Johnathan West	5,127	3.9
Democratic	Owen Ingram	4,912	3.7
Independent	Brenda Willis	2,667	2.0
Total votes			100.0
Republican hold			
Republican hold			
Republican hold			
Republican hold			
Republican hold			
Republican hold			
Republican hold			
Republican hold			
Republican hold			
Republican gain from Democratic			

=== Rockingham 7 ===
- Elects four representatives

Republican primary

Rockingham 7 Republican primary
Party	Candidate	Votes	%
Republican	Charles McMahon (incumbent)	1,166	20.2
Republican	Mary Griffin (incumbent)	1,136	19.7
Republican	Julius Soti	1,009	17.5
Republican	Bob Lynn	995	17.3
Republican	Walter Kolodziej (incumbent)	918	15.9
Republican	Joe Plonski	538	9.3
Total votes		5,762	100.0

General election

Rockingham 7 general election, 2020
Party	Candidate	Votes	%
Republican	Mary Griffin (incumbent)	5,591	16.3
Republican	Charles McMahon (incumbent)	5,554	16.2
Republican	Bob Lynn	5,089	14.8
Republican	Julius Soti	4,777	13.9
Democratic	Kristi St. Laurent	4,357	12.7
Democratic	Valerie Roman	3,443	10.0
Democratic	Henri Azibert	2,808	8.2
Democratic	Ioana Singureanu	2,764	8.0
Total votes		34,383	100.0
Republican hold			
Republican hold			
Republican hold			
Republican hold			

=== Rockingham 8 ===
- Elects nine representatives

Republican primary

Rockingham 8 Republican primary
Party	Candidate	Votes	%
Republican	Fred Doucette (incumbent)	1,986	9.8
Republican	John Sytek (incumbent)	1,977	9.8
Republican	Daryl Abbas (incumbent)	1,909	9.4
Republican	Joe Sweeney	1,809	8.9
Republican	John Janigian (incumbent)	1,780	8.8
Republican	Everett McBride (incumbent)	1,619	8.0
Republican	Betty Gay (incumbent)	1,579	7.8
Republican	Bob Elliott (incumbent)	1,447	7.1
Republican	Susan Vandecasteele	1,347	6.7
Republican	Tanya Donnelly	1,336	6.6
Republican	John Manning Jr.	1,169	5.8
Republican	Dave Blake	1,158	5.7
Republican	Joe Lessard	1,120	5.5
Total votes		20,236	100.0

General election

Rockingham 8 general election, 2020
Party	Candidate	Votes	%
Republican	Joe Sweeney	8,795	7.3
Republican	John Sytek (incumbent)	8,349	6.9
Republican	Fred Doucette (incumbent)	8,101	6.7
Republican	Daryl Abbas (incumbent)	8,086	6.7
Republican	Everett McBride (incumbent)	8,021	6.6
Republican	Susan Vandecasteele	8,016	6.6
Republican	Betty Gay (incumbent)	7,977	6.6
Republican	John Janigian (incumbent)	7,870	6.5
Republican	Bob Elliott (incumbent)	7,703	6.4
Democratic	Bonnie Wright	6,301	5.2
Democratic	Maureen Thibault	5,447	4.5
Democratic	Sara Dillingham	5,418	4.5
Democratic	Claire Karibian	5,391	4.5
Democratic	Jacqueline Muollo	5,194	4.3
Democratic	Donna Loranger	5,118	4.2
Democratic	Gregory Davis	5,040	4.2
Democratic	Cam Iannalfo	5,031	4.2
Democratic	Sean Lewis	4,859	4.0
Total votes		120,717	100.0
Republican hold			
Republican hold			
Republican hold			
Republican hold			
Republican hold			
Republican hold			
Republican hold			
Republican hold			
Republican hold			

=== Rockingham 9 ===
- Elects two representatives

Rockingham 9 general election, 2020
Party	Candidate	Votes	%
Republican	Michael Vose (incumbent)	2,215	27.2
Republican	Cody Belanger	2,147	26.3
Democratic	Mark Vallone (incumbent)	2,090	25.6
Democratic	Gregory Tillman	1,704	20.9
Total votes		8,156	100.0
Republican hold			
Republican gain from Democratic			

=== Rockingham 10 ===
- Elects one representative

Rockingham 10 general election, 2020
Party	Candidate	Votes	%
Republican	Dennis Acton (incumbent)	1,649	61.3
Democratic	Ellen Marie Douglas	1,042	38.7
Total votes		2,691	100.0
Republican hold			

=== Rockingham 11 ===
- Elects one representative

Rockingham 11 general election, 2020
Party	Candidate	Votes	%
Republican	Melissa Litchfield	1,454	51.0
Democratic	Liz McConnell (incumbent)	1,395	49.0
Total votes		2,849	100.0
Republican gain from Democratic			

=== Rockingham 12 ===
- Elects one representative

Rockingham 12 general election, 2020
Party	Candidate	Votes	%
Republican	Scott Wallace (incumbent)	1,682	63.7
Democratic	Diana West	958	36.3
Total votes		2,640	100.0
Republican hold			

=== Rockingham 13 ===
- Elects four representatives

Rockingham 13 general election, 2020
Party	Candidate	Votes	%
Republican	Joe Guthrie (incumbent)	5,407	16.3
Republican	Kenneth Weyler (incumbent)	5,057	15.3
Republican	David Welch (incumbent)	4,932	14.9
Republican	Dennis Green (incumbent)	4,759	14.4
Democratic	Laurie Warnock	3,438	10.4
Democratic	Trisha Tidd	3,222	9.7
Democratic	Jim LaValley	3,185	9.6
Democratic	Mindy Funke Collins	3,093	9.4
Total votes		33,093	100.0
Republican hold			
Republican hold			
Republican hold			
Republican hold			

=== Rockingham 14 ===
- Elects four representatives

Rockingham 14 general election, 2020
Party	Candidate	Votes	%
Republican	Peter Torosian (incumbent)	5,353	16.3
Republican	Debra DeSimone (incumbent)	5,035	15.4
Republican	Norman Major (incumbent)	4,979	15.2
Republican	Robert Harb (incumbent)	4,702	14.3
Democratic	Kay Galloway	3,613	11.0
Democratic	Kate Delfino	3,318	10.1
Democratic	Nancy Bishop	3,019	9.2
Democratic	George Hamblen	2,771	8.5
Total votes		32,790	100.0
Republican hold			
Republican hold			
Republican hold			
Republican hold			

=== Rockingham 15 ===
- Elects one representative

Rockingham 15 general election, 2020
Party	Candidate	Votes	%
Republican	Charles Melvin (incumbent)	1,708	60.0
Democratic	Robert Bartlett	1,139	40.0
Total votes		2,847	100.0
Republican hold			

=== Rockingham 16 ===
- Elects one representative

Rockingham 16 general election, 2020
Party	Candidate	Votes	%
Republican	JD Bernardy	1,996	53.7
Democratic	Peter Oldak	1,722	46.3
Total votes		3,718	100.0
Republican hold			

=== Rockingham 17 ===
- Elects three representatives

Rockingham 17 general election, 2020
Party	Candidate	Votes	%
Democratic	Charlotte DiLorenzo (incumbent)	3,829	27.3
Democratic	Michael Cahill (incumbent)	3,751	26.8
Democratic	Ellen Read (incumbent)	3,561	25.4
Republican	Carolyn Scanlon	2,867	20.5
Total votes		14,008	100.0
Democratic hold			
Democratic hold			
Democratic hold			

=== Rockingham 18 ===
- Elects four representatives

Rockingham 18 general election, 2020
Party	Candidate	Votes	%
Democratic	Julie Gilman (incumbent)	5,865	16.6
Democratic	Gaby Grossman (incumbent)	5,773	16.3
Democratic	Lisa Bunker (incumbent)	5,598	15.8
Democratic	Mark Paige	5,583	15.8
Republican	Greg Stone	3,317	9.4
Republican	Edward Duncan	3,191	9.0
Republican	Carl Wikstrom	3,063	8.7
Republican	William Smith	2,972	8.4
Total votes		35,362	100.0
Democratic hold			
Democratic hold			
Democratic hold			
Democratic hold			

=== Rockingham 19 ===
- Elects two representatives

Rockingham 19 general election, 2020
Party	Candidate	Votes	%
Democratic	Debra Altschiller (incumbent)	2,707	26.4
Republican	Patrick Abrami (incumbent)	2,629	26.6
Democratic	Jennifer Scrafford	2,474	24.1
Republican	Amy Jeffrey	2,438	23.8
Total votes		10,248	100.0
Democratic hold			
Republican hold			

=== Rockingham 20 ===
- Elects three representatives

Republican primary

Rockingham 20 Republican primary
Party	Candidate	Votes	%
Republican	Tim Baxter	1,010	30.4
Republican	Aboul Khan (incumbent)	652	19.6
Republican	Tina Harley	636	19.1
Republican	Austin Greene	552	16.6
Republican	William Fowler (incumbent)	293	8.8
Republican	William Rosser	180	5.4
Total votes		3,323	100.0

General election

Rockingham 20 general election, 2020
Party	Candidate	Votes	%
Republican	Aboul Khan (incumbent)	3,444	21.6
Republican	Tim Baxter	3,292	20.6
Republican	Tina Harley	3,182	19.9
Democratic	Patricia O'Keefe	2,448	15.3
Democratic	Greg Marrow	1,905	11.9
Democratic	Louis Flynn	1,683	10.6
Total votes		15,954	100.0
Republican hold			
Republican hold			
Republican hold			

=== Rockingham 21 ===
- Elects four representatives.

Rockingham 21 general election, 2020
Party	Candidate	Votes	%
Democratic	Mike Edgar (incumbent)	5,106	13.0
Republican	Tracy Emerick	5,086	13.0
Democratic	Tom Loughman (incumbent)	5,085	13.0
Democratic	Renny Cushing (incumbent)	5,072	12.9
Democratic	Katherine Harake	4,948	12.6
Republican	Ken Sheffert	4,649	11.9
Republican	David Hagen	4,643	11.8
Republican	Sharleene Hurst	4,625	11.8
Total votes		39,214	100.0
Democratic hold			
Republican gain from Democratic			
Democratic hold			
Democratic hold			

=== Rockingham 22 ===
- Elects one representative

Rockingham 22 general election, 2020
Party	Candidate	Votes	%
Democratic	Jim Maggiore (incumbent)	1,733	51.7
Republican	Kristen Larsen	1,620	48.3
Total votes		3,353	100.0
Democratic hold			

=== Rockingham 23 ===
- Elects one representative

Rockingham 23 general election, 2020
Party	Candidate	Votes	%
Democratic	Dennis Malloy (incumbent)	1,767	51.4
Republican	Jenni Boynton	1,673	48.6
Total votes		3,440	100.0
Democratic hold			

=== Rockingham 24 ===
- Elects two representatives

Republican primary

Rockingham 24 Republican primary
Party	Candidate	Votes	%
Republican	Julie Tucker	888	48.2
Republican	Joanne Meyer	627	34.0
Republican	Ryan Lent	327	17.8
Total votes		1,842	100.0

General election

Rockingham 24 general election, 2020
Party	Candidate	Votes	%
Democratic	Jaci Grote (incumbent)	2,745	27.5
Democratic	Kate Murray (incumbent)	2,686	26.9
Republican	Julie Tucker	2,406	24.1
Republican	Joanne Meyer	2,153	21.5
Total votes		9,990	100.0
Democratic hold			
Democratic hold			

=== Rockingham 25 ===
- Elects one representative.

Democratic primary

Rockingham 25 Democratic primary
Party	Candidate	Votes	%
Democratic	Laura Pantelakos (incumbent)	426	51.8
Democratic	Robin Vogt	397	48.2
Total votes		823	100.0

General election

- No other candidate filed for the seat.

Rockingham 25 general election, 2020
Party	Candidate	Votes	%
Democratic	Laura Pantelakos (incumbent)	2,111	100.0
Total votes		2,111	100.0
Democratic hold			

=== Rockingham 26 ===
- Elects one representative

Rockingham 26 general election, 2020
Party	Candidate	Votes	%
Democratic	Rebecca McBeath (incumbent)	2,354	74.5
Republican	Alexandria Knox	808	25.5
Total votes		3,162	100.0
Democratic hold			

=== Rockingham 27 ===
- Elects one representative
- No other candidate filed for the seat.

Rockingham 27 general election, 2020
Party	Candidate	Votes	%
Democratic	Peter Somssich (incumbent)	1,696	100.0
Total votes		1,696	100.0
Democratic hold			

=== Rockingham 28 ===
- Elects one representative

Rockingham 28 general election, 2020
Party	Candidate	Votes	%
Democratic	Gerry Ward (incumbent)	1,541	62.2
Republican	Cynthia Taylor-Hollandbeck	936	37.8
Total votes		2,477	100.0
Democratic hold			

=== Rockingham 29 ===
- Elects one representative.
- No other candidate filed for the seat.

Rockingham 29 general election, 2020
Party	Candidate	Votes	%
Democratic	David Meuse (incumbent)	2,035	100.0
Total votes		2,035	100.0
Democratic hold			

=== Rockingham 30 ===
- Elects one representative.

Democratic primary

Rockingham 30 Democratic primary
Party	Candidate	Votes	%
Democratic	Jacqueline Cali-Pitts (incumbent)	2,202	66.2
Democratic	Rich DiPentima	1,123	33.8
Total votes		3,325	100.0

General election

Rockingham 30 general election, 2020
Party	Candidate	Votes	%
Democratic	Jacqueline Cali-Pitts (incumbent)	7,708	69.9
Republican	Tom Lukacz	3,313	30.1
Total votes		11,021	100.0
Democratic hold			

=== Rockingham 31 ===
- Elects one representative

Rockingham 31 general election, 2020
Party	Candidate	Votes	%
Democratic	Joan Hamblet	4,831	52.7
Republican	Henry Marsh	4,339	47.3
Total votes		9,170	100.0
Democratic hold			

=== Rockingham 32 ===
- Elects one representative

Rockingham 32 general election, 2020
Party	Candidate	Votes	%
Republican	Terry Roy (incumbent)	6,928	59.4
Democratic	Hal Rafter	4,727	40.6
Total votes		11,655	100.0
Republican hold			

=== Rockingham 33 ===
- Elects one representative

Rockingham 33 general election, 2020
Party	Candidate	Votes	%
Republican	Josh Yokela (incumbent)	4,606	56.8
Democratic	Eric Turer	3,507	43.2
Total votes		8,113	100.0
Republican hold			

=== Rockingham 34 ===
- Elects one representative

Rockingham 34 general election, 2020
Party	Candidate	Votes	%
Republican	Mark Pearson (incumbent)	11,132	61.1
Democratic	Lisa DeMio	7,086	38.9
Total votes		18,218	100.0
Republican hold			

=== Rockingham 35 ===
- Elects one representative

Rockingham 35 general election, 2020
Party	Candidate	Votes	%
Republican	Deborah Hobson (incumbent)	3,834	58.7
Democratic	Robert Moore	2,693	41.3
Total votes		6,527	100.0
Republican hold			

=== Rockingham 36 ===
- Elects one representative

Rockingham 36 general election, 2020
Party	Candidate	Votes	%
Democratic	Alexis Simpson	12,898	59.9
Republican	Daniel Gray	8,649	40.1
Total votes		21,547	100.0
Democratic hold			

=== Rockingham 37 ===
- Elects one representative

Republican primary

Rockingham 37 Republican primary
Party	Candidate	Votes	%
Republican	Max Abramson (incumbent) (Note: Rep. Abramson is the incumbent from Rockingham 20.)	1,491	52.3
Republican	Jason Janvrin (incumbent)	1,358	47.7
Total votes		2,849	100.0

General election

Rockingham 37 general election, 2020
Party	Candidate	Votes	%
Republican	Max Abramson (incumbent)	8,753	52.8
Democratic	Elaine Andrews-Ahearn	7,818	47.2
Total votes		16,571	100.0
Republican hold			

== Strafford County ==
=== Strafford 1 ===
- Elects two representatives.

Republican primary

Strafford 1 Republican primary
Party	Candidate	Votes	%
Republican	Glenn Bailey	449	44.6
Republican	Peter Hayward (incumbent)	300	29.8
Republican	Abigail Rooney (incumbent)	257	25.6
Total votes		1,006	100.0

General election

Strafford 1 general election, 2020
Party	Candidate	Votes	%
Republican	Glenn Bailey	2,030	39.5
Republican	Peter Hayward (incumbent)	1,754	34.2
Democratic	Larry Brown	1,350	26.3
Total votes		5,134	100.0
Republican hold			
Republican hold			

=== Strafford 2 ===
- Elects two representatives

Strafford 2 general election, 2020
Party	Candidate	Votes	%
Republican	James Horgan (incumbent)	1,742	35.8
Republican	Joseph Pitre (incumbent)	1,571	32.3
Democratic	Emmanuel Krasner	1,548	31.9
Total votes		4,861	100.0
Republican hold			
Republican hold			

=== Strafford 3 ===
- Elects two representatives

Strafford 3 general election, 2020
Party	Candidate	Votes	%
Republican	Michael Harrington (incumbent)	2,416	29.1
Republican	Kurt Wuelper (incumbent)	2,386	28.7
Democratic	Jeff Allard	1,765	21.2
Democratic	Heath Howard	1,749	21.0
Total votes		8,316	100.0
Republican hold			
Republican hold			

=== Strafford 4 ===
- Elects two representatives

Strafford 4 general election, 2020
Party	Candidate	Votes	%
Republican	Len Turcotte	2,844	26.3
Democratic	Cassandra Levesque (incumbent)	2,755	25.5
Democratic	Matthew Towne (incumbent)	2,611	24.1
Republican	Jenny Wilson	2,604	24.1
Total votes		10,814	100.0
Republican gain from Democratic			
Democratic hold			

=== Strafford 5 ===
- Elects one representative

Strafford 5 general election, 2020
Party	Candidate	Votes	%
Democratic	Jeffrey Salloway (incumbent)	1,702	60.5
Republican	Scott Bugbee	1,113	39.5
Total votes		2,815	100.0
Democratic hold			

=== Strafford 6 ===
- Elects five representatives

Democratic primary

Strafford 6 Democratic primary
Party	Candidate	Votes	%
Democratic	Janet Wall (incumbent)	1,981	19.5
Democratic	Marjorie Smith (incumbent)	1,942	19.1
Democratic	Judith Spang (incumbent)	1,880	18.5
Democratic	Timothy Horrigan (incumbent)	1,648	16.2
Democratic	Cam Kenney (incumbent)	1,557	15.3
Democratic	Wayne Burton	1,177	11.6
Total votes		10,185	100.0

General election

Strafford 6 general election, 2020
Party	Candidate	Votes	%
Democratic	Janet Wall (incumbent)	5,496	14.6
Democratic	Marjorie Smith (incumbent)	5,443	14.4
Democratic	Judith Spang (incumbent)	5,440	14.4
Democratic	Cam Kenney (incumbent)	5,402	14.3
Democratic	Timothy Horrigan (incumbent)	5,393	14.3
Republican	Bonnie McDermott	2,291	6.1
Republican	Cheryl Lamoureux	2,216	5.9
Republican	Mark Racic	2,140	5.7
Republican	Cliff Zetterstrom	2,031	5.4
Republican	James Ziegra	1,934	5.1
Total votes		37,786	100.0
Democratic hold			
Democratic hold			
Democratic hold			
Democratic hold			
Democratic hold			

=== Strafford 7 ===
- Elects one representative

Strafford 7 general election, 2020
Party	Candidate	Votes	%
Democratic	Timothy Fontneau (incumbent)	1,409	50.1
Republican	Harrison deBree	1,405	49.9
Total votes		2,814	100.0
Democratic hold			

=== Strafford 8 ===
- Elects one representative

Strafford 8 general election, 2020
Party	Candidate	Votes	%
Democratic	Donna Ellis (incumbent)	1,206	54.2
Republican	Kalmen Barkin	1,021	45.8
Total votes		2,227	100.0
Democratic hold			

=== Strafford 9 ===
- Elects one representative

Strafford 9 general election, 2020
Party	Candidate	Votes	%
Republican	Clifford Newton	1,492	54.9
Democratic	Tom Ransom	1,225	45.1
Total votes		2,717	100.0
Republican hold			

=== Strafford 10 ===
- Elects one representative.

Republican primary

Strafford 10 Republican primary
Party	Candidate	Votes	%
Republican	Aidan Ankarberg	313	68.5
Republican	Don Leeman	144	31.5
Total votes		457	100.0

General election

- No other candidate filed for the seat.

Strafford 10 general election, 2020
Party	Candidate	Votes	%
Republican	Aidan Ankarberg	1,994	100.0
Total votes		1,994	100.0
Republican hold			

=== Strafford 11 ===
- Elects one representative

Strafford 11 general election, 2020
Party	Candidate	Votes	%
Democratic	Chuck Grassie (incumbent)	1,324	51.5
Republican	Sue DeLemus	1,245	48.5
Total votes		2,569	100.0
Democratic hold			

=== Strafford 12 ===
- Elects one representative

Strafford 12 general election, 2020
Party	Candidate	Votes	%
Republican	Mac Kittredge (incumbent)	1,451	53.0
Democratic	Anni DeVito	1,288	47.0
Total votes		2,739	100.0
Republican hold			

=== Strafford 13 ===
- Elects one representative

Strafford 13 general election, 2020
Party	Candidate	Votes	%
Democratic	Casey Conley (incumbent)	2,164	71.2
Republican	Debra Childs	877	28.8
Total votes		3,041	100.0
Democratic hold			

=== Strafford 14 ===
- Elects one representative.

Strafford 14 general election, 2020
Party	Candidate	Votes	%
Democratic	Kristina Fargo (incumbent)	2,103	68.4
Republican	Mary Ann Copper	974	31.6
Total votes		3,077	100.0
Democratic hold			

=== Strafford 15 ===
- Elects one representative

Democratic primary

Strafford 15 Democratic primary
Party	Candidate	Votes	%
Democratic	Ariel Oxaal	625	69.8
Democratic	David Greene	271	30.2
Total votes		896	100.0

General election

Strafford 15 general election, 2020
Party	Candidate	Votes	%
Democratic	Ariel Oxaal	2,091	56.8
Republican	Tyler Blouin	1,591	43.2
Total votes		3,682	100.0
Democratic hold			

=== Strafford 16 ===
- Elects one representative

Strafford 16 general election, 2020
Party	Candidate	Votes	%
Democratic	Sherry Frost (incumbent)	1,946	60.3
Republican	Steve Morgan	1,281	39.7
Total votes		3,227	100.0
Democratic hold			

=== Strafford 17 ===
- Elects three representatives

Strafford 17 general election, 2020
Party	Candidate	Votes	%
Democratic	Susan Treleaven (incumbent)	3,387	20.6
Democratic	Peter Bixby (incumbent)	3,114	18.9
Democratic	Kenneth Vincent (incumbent)	3,060	18.6
Republican	Mike Castaldo	2,489	15.1
Republican	Edwina Hastings	2,310	14.1
Republican	Simon Allie	2,082	12.7
Total votes		16,442	100.0
Democratic hold			
Democratic hold			
Democratic hold			

=== Strafford 18 ===
- Elects three representatives

Republican primary

Strafford 18 Republican primary
Party	Candidate	Votes	%
Republican	Matthew Spencer	588	34.2
Republican	Jodi Lavoie-Carnes	422	24.5
Republican	Steven McMahon	410	23.8
Republican	Philip Munck	300	17.4
Total votes		1,720	100.0

General election

Strafford 18 general election, 2020
Party	Candidate	Votes	%
Democratic	Wendy Chase (incumbent)	3,255	19.6
Democratic	Cecilia Rich (incumbent)	2,980	17.9
Democratic	Gerri Cannon (incumbent)	2,965	17.8
Republican	Matthew Spencer	2,666	16.0
Republican	Steven McMahon	2,387	14.4
Republican	Jodi Lavoie-Carnes	2,382	14.3
Total votes		16,635	100.0
Democratic hold			
Democratic hold			
Democratic hold			

=== Strafford 19 ===
- Elects one representative

Strafford 19 general election, 2020
Party	Candidate	Votes	%
Democratic	Peter B. Schmidt (incumbent)	4,300	70.5
Republican	William Burr	1,797	29.5
Total votes		6,097	100.0
Democratic hold			

=== Strafford 20 ===
- Elects one representative

Strafford 20 general election, 2020
Party	Candidate	Votes	%
Democratic	Tom Southworth (incumbent)	3,997	58.3
Republican	Steven Wyrsch	2,862	41.7
Total votes		6,859	100.0
Democratic hold			

=== Strafford 21 ===
- Elects one representative

Strafford 21 general election, 2020
Party	Candidate	Votes	%
Democratic	Catt Sandler (incumbent)	6,868	56.0
Republican	Philip Munck	5,393	44.0
Total votes		12,261	100.0
Democratic hold			

=== Strafford 22 ===
- Elects one representative

Strafford 22 general election, 2020
Party	Candidate	Votes	%
Republican	Thomas Kaczynski	2,591	51.4
Democratic	Peg Higgins (incumbent)	2,449	48.6
Total votes		5,040	100.0
Republican gain from Democratic			

=== Strafford 23 ===
- Elects one representative

Strafford 23 general election, 2020
Party	Candidate	Votes	%
Republican	Fenton Groen	2,945	52.5
Democratic	Sandra Keans (incumbent)	2,666	47.5
Total votes		5,611	100.0
Republican gain from Democratic			

=== Strafford 24 ===
- Elects one representative

Strafford 24 general election, 2020
Party	Candidate	Votes	%
Republican	Susan DeLemus	2,876	54.6
Democratic	Jeremiah Minihan	2,393	45.4
Total votes		5,269	100.0
Republican hold			

=== Strafford 25 ===
- Elects one representative

Strafford 25 general election, 2020
Party	Candidate	Votes	%
Democratic	Amanda Gourgue (incumbent)	4,524	53.0
Republican	Joe Hannon	4,005	47.0
Total votes		8,529	100.0
Democratic hold			

== Sullivan County ==
=== Sullivan 1 ===
- Elects two representatives

Sullivan 1 general election, 2020
Party	Candidate	Votes	%
Democratic	Brian Sullivan (incumbent)	3,353	30.8
Democratic	Lee Oxenham (incumbent)	3,241	29.8
Republican	Virginia Drye	2,392	22.0
Republican	Tanya McIntire	1,898	17.4
Total votes		10,884	100.0
Democratic hold			
Democratic hold			

=== Sullivan 2 ===
- Elects one representative

Sullivan 2 general election, 2020
Party	Candidate	Votes	%
Democratic	Sue Gottling	1,446	50.9
Republican	Don Bettencourt	1,393	49.1
Total votes		2,839	100.0
Democratic gain from Republican			

=== Sullivan 3 ===
- Elects one representative

Sullivan 3 general election, 2020
Party	Candidate	Votes	%
Democratic	Andrew O'Hearne (incumbent)	854	54.7
Republican	Patrick Lozito	706	45.3
Total votes		1,560	100.0
Democratic hold			

=== Sullivan 4 ===
- Elects one representative

Sullivan 4 general election, 2020
Party	Candidate	Votes	%
Democratic	Gary Merchant (incumbent)	1,119	51.7
Republican	Paul LaCasse	1,047	48.3
Total votes		2,166	100.0
Democratic hold			

=== Sullivan 5 ===
- Elects one representative

Sullivan 5 general election, 2020
Party	Candidate	Votes	%
Republican	Walter Stapleton (incumbent)	996	54.0
Democratic	Liza Draper	849	46.0
Total votes		1,845	100.0
Republican hold			

=== Sullivan 6 ===
- Elects two representatives

Sullivan 6 general election, 2020
Party	Candidate	Votes	%
Republican	Skip Rollins (incumbent)	2,428	36.3
Republican	John Callum (incumbent)	1,792	26.8
Democratic	Larry Flint	1,411	21.1
Democratic	Peter Franklin	1,062	15.9
Total votes		6,693	100.0
Republican hold			
Republican hold			

=== Sullivan 7 ===
- Elects one representative

Sullivan 7 general election, 2020
Party	Candidate	Votes	%
Republican	Judy Aron (incumbent)	1,722	60.9
Democratic	Claudia Istel	1,108	39.1
Total votes		2,830	100.0
Republican hold			

=== Sullivan 8 ===
- Elects one representative

Sullivan 8 general election, 2020
Party	Candidate	Votes	%
Republican	Walter Spilsbury	1,239	52.1
Democratic	John Streeter	1,138	47.9
Total votes		2,377	100.0
Republican hold			

=== Sullivan 9 ===
- Elects one representative

Sullivan 9 general election, 2020
Party	Candidate	Votes	%
Democratic	Linda Tanner (incumbent)	6,022	48.2
Republican	Margaret Drye	5,914	47.4
Libertarian	Tobin Menard	546	4.4
Total votes		12,482	100.0
Democratic hold			

=== Sullivan 10 ===
- Elects one representative

Sullivan 10 general election, 2020
Party	Candidate	Votes	%
Democratic	John Cloutier (incumbent)	2,993	53.5
Republican	Jonathan Stone	2,604	46.5
Total votes		5,597	100.0
Democratic hold			

=== Sullivan 11 ===
- Elects one representative

Sullivan 11 general election, 2020
Party	Candidate	Votes	%
Republican	Steven D. Smith (incumbent)	3,223	62.2
Democratic	Mary Henry	1,961	37.8
Total votes		5,184	100.0
Republican hold			

== See also ==
- 2020 New Hampshire elections
- 2020 United States elections
- 2020 United States Senate election in New Hampshire
- 2020 United States House of Representatives elections in New Hampshire
- New Hampshire gubernatorial election, 2020
