= Safiya Wazir =

American politician (born 1991)

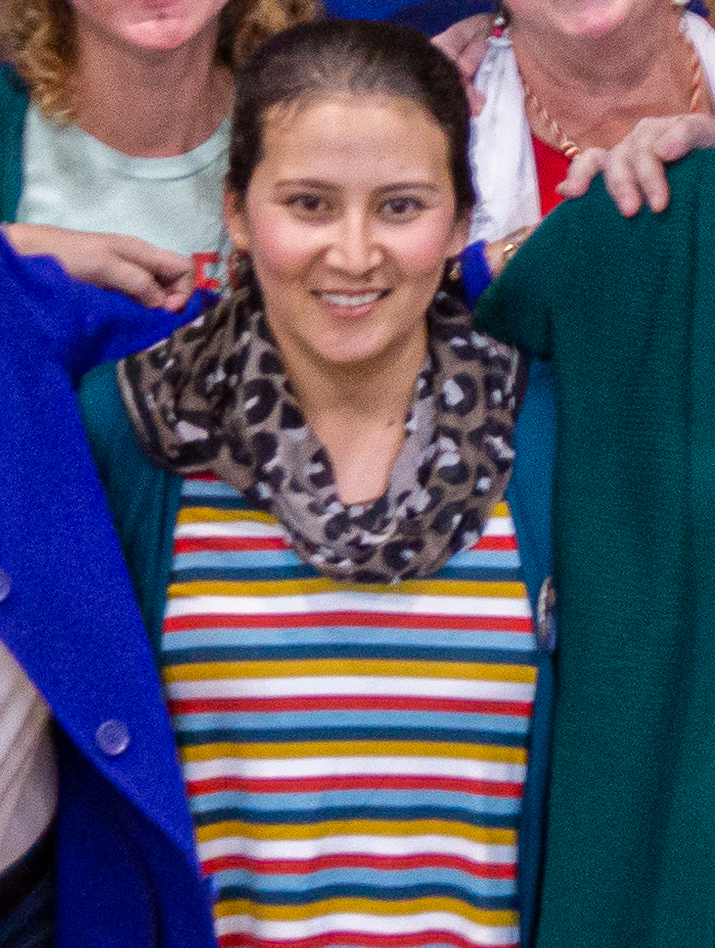

Member of the New Hampshire House of Representatives from the Merrimack 17th district
- In office December 6, 2018 – December 7, 2022
- Preceded by: Dick Patten
- Succeeded by: James Roesener

Personal details
- Born: 1991 (age 34–35) Afghanistan
- Party: Democratic
- Profession: Activist

Safiya Wazir (Dari: صفية وزیر; born 1991) is an Afghan-American community activist and politician. She served as a Democratic member of the New Hampshire House of Representatives. Wazir is the first former refugee to serve in the New Hampshire State House and one of the first Afghan Americans elected to public office in the United States, the other being Aisha Wahab.

== Early life and education ==
Wazir and her family lived in Baghlan Province in Afghanistan prior to Taliban rule. She is from the Hazara ethnic group. Her family left Afghanistan during her childhood, and spent ten years in Uzbekistan before immigrating to Concord, New Hampshire. She knew little English upon her arrival and studied the dictionary to learn the language. Her family was unable to communicate in English shortly after their arrival but received assistance from a Lutheran organization and often ate only rice.

She was forced to restart her secondary school education and thus graduated from high school at age 20. She enrolled in the New Hampshire Technical Institute, where she took night classes so she could support her family. She graduated from the community college with a degree in business.

Upon her parents' insistence, she returned to Afghanistan for an arranged marriage, and together with her spouse she returned to Concord.

== Career ==
Wazir began working within the Heights community of Concord, becoming a director of its Community Action Program and a vice-chairwoman of its Head Start Policy Council. In February 2018, Wazir's friend suggested that she run for office, although Wazir refused the request until her partner and parents agreed to support her children. In September 2018, she beat Dick Patten to win the Democratic primary for a seat in the legislature of New Hampshire. Shortly thereafter, Wazir became the first refugee to be elected to New Hampshire's state house.

The BBC listed Wazir on their list of 100 Women in 2018.

=== Electoral record ===
NH House District 17 - Merrimack general election, 2020
Party	Candidate	Votes	%
Democratic	Safiya Wazir (incumbent)	1,209	54.3
Republican	Dennis Soucy	1,016	45.7
Total votes		2,225	100.0
Democratic hold			
