= Michele Roussel Buckley =

American politician

Member-elect of the New Hampshire House of Representatives from the Hillsborough 6th district
- Assuming office December 2026
- Succeeding: Suzanne Vail

Personal details
- Party: Democratic

Michele Roussel Buckley is an American politician. A member of the Democratic Party, she is the member-elect for the Hillsborough 6th district of the New Hampshire House of Representatives.
