= Armand Forest =

American politician

Member of New Hampshire House of Representatives for Hillsborough 18
- In office 2014–2018
- Succeeded by: Willis Griffith

Personal details
- Party: Democratic

Armand D. Forest is an American politician. He was a member of the New Hampshire House of Representatives and represented Hillsborough 18th district.
