= Duane Brown (politician) =

American politician

Member of New Hampshire House of Representatives for Grafton 16
- In office 2014–2018
- Succeeded by: Francesca Diggs

Personal details
- Party: Republican
- Education: Daniel Webster College

Duane Brown is an American politician. He was a member of the New Hampshire House of Representatives and represented Grafton 16th district.
