= Sly Karasinski =

American politician

Member of the New Hampshire House of Representatives from the Cheshire 10th district
- Incumbent
- Assumed office December 4, 2024
- Preceded by: Bruce Tatro
- Succeeded by: Steve Russell (elect)

Personal details
- Party: Republican

Sly Karasinski is an American politician. He serves as a Republican member for the Cheshire 10th district of the New Hampshire House of Representatives.
