= Russell Ober =

American politician

Russ Ober

Member of the New Hampshire House of Representatives from the Hillsborough 37th district
- In office December 2006 – July 22, 2021
- In office December 2002 – December 2004

Personal details
- Born: Russell Theodore Ober III; August 13, 1938 (age 88) Worcester, Massachusetts, U.S.
- Party: Republican
- Spouse: Lynne Ober
- Education: University of Maryland; Central Michigan University; Syracuse University
- Occupation: teacher

Military service
- Allegiance: United States
- Branch/service: United States Air Force
- Years of service: 1962–1984
- Rank: Lieutenant colonel
- Battles/wars: Vietnam War

Russell Theodore Ober III (born August 13, 1938) is an American politician from the state of New Hampshire. He is a former member of the New Hampshire House of Representatives, sitting as a Republican from the Hillsborough 37 district, having been first elected in 2006, and previously serving from 2002 to 2004. In 2021, after his wife, Lynne Ober, was stripped of her committee leadership position, he resigned alongside her.
