= Paul Berch =

American politician

Member of the New Hampshire House of Representatives from the Cheshire 6th district
- Incumbent
- Assumed office December 4, 2024

Member of the New Hampshire House of Representatives from the Cheshire 1st district
- In office December 5, 2012 – December 7, 2022

Personal details
- Party: Democratic
- Children: 2
- Education: Calvin Coolidge High School; George Washington University (BA); University of Chicago (JD)

Paul Berch is a New Hampshire lawyer and politician who has been serving in the New Hampshire House of Representatives as a Democrat since 2024. Berch previously served in the New Hampshire House of Representatives from 2012 to 2022.

== Education ==
Berch graduated from Calvin Coolidge High School. He earned a B.A. from George Washington University in 1967. Berch also earned a Juris Doctor from University of Chicago in 1970.

== Career ==
Berch is a retired public service attorney. He worked in the private law sector and in the Windham County Public Defender Office from 1975 to 2009.

On November 6, 2012, Berch was elected to the New Hampshire House of Representatives to represent the Cheshire 1st district as a Democrat. He assumed office on December 5, 2012.

Berch was re-elected in 2014, 2016, 2018, and 2020.

In 2022, Berch ran for re-election to represent the Cheshire 15th district. He was defeated in the Democratic primary on September 13, 2022, losing to incumbent Amanda Toll and Renee Monteil, and thus losing an election bid for the first time in nearly a decade. Berch's term concluded on December 7, 2022.

In 2024, Berch was reelected to represent the Cheshire 6th district.

== Personal life ==
Berch resides in Westmoreland, New Hampshire. Berch is married and has two children and three grandchildren. He is Jewish.
