= Willis Griffith =

American politician

Member of New Hampshire House of Representatives for Hillsborough 18
- In office December 5, 2018 – December 7, 2022
- Preceded by: Armand Forest

Personal details
- Party: Democratic

Willis T. Griffith is an American politician. He was a member of the New Hampshire House of Representatives and represented the Hillsborough 18th district.
