= Suzanne Vail =

American politician

Member of the New Hampshire House of Representatives from the Hillsborough 6th district
- In office December 6, 2022 – June 15, 2026
- Succeeded by: Michele Roussel Buckley (elect)

Member of the New Hampshire House of Representatives from the Hillsborough 30th district
- In office 2018 – December 6, 2022

Member of the New Hampshire House of Representatives from the Hillsborough 29th district
- In office 2012–2014

Personal details
- Party: Democratic

Suzanne Vail is an American politician. She served as a Democratic member for the Hillsborough 6th district of the New Hampshire House of Representatives. She resigned in June 2026.
