= Bruce Tatro =

American politician

Member of the New Hampshire House of Representatives from the Cheshire 6th district
- In office 2010–2012

Member of the New Hampshire House of Representatives from the Cheshire 15th district
- In office 2012–2020

Member of the New Hampshire House of Representatives from the Cheshire 10th district
- In office December 7, 2022 – 2024
- Succeeded by: Sly Karasinski

Personal details
- Party: Democratic

Bruce Tatro is an American politician. He served as a Democratic member for the Cheshire 10th district of the New Hampshire House of Representatives from 2010 to 2024.
