= Lynne Ober =

American politician (born 1943)

Member of the New Hampshire House of Representatives from the Hillsborough 37th district
- In office December 2004 – July 22, 2021

Personal details
- Born: July 10, 1943 (age 83)
- Party: Republican
- Spouse: Russell Ober
- Education: University of Maryland, University of Southern California
- Occupation: writer

Lynne Ober (born July 10, 1943) is an American politician from the state of New Hampshire. She is a former member of the New Hampshire House of Representatives, sitting as a Republican from the Hillsborough 37th district, having been first elected in 2004.

During the 2021 New Hampshire budget negotiations, Ober was vice chair of the house finance committee. In this role, she disobeyed directions by house speaker Sherman Packard and majority leader Jason Osborne to wait for negotiations to be completed before calling a vote on emergency powers and paid family leave components of the budget. As a result, Packard stripped Ober of her committee leadership positions. She and her husband Russell Ober then resigned in protest.
