= Chris Balch =

American politician

Member of the New Hampshire House of Representatives from the Hillsborough 38 district
- In office December 5, 2018 – December 1, 2020

Personal details
- Party: Democratic

Chris Balch is an American retired science teacher, author, environmentalist, climate and peace activist, and former politician from New Hampshire. Balch is also a sailor and boat builder.

== Career ==
As a science teacher, Chris Balch taught biological, chemical, and physical science in both public and private schools for 40 years. He started teaching a school in Vermont and then at Lawrence Academy. In 1992, he made the move to New Hampshire as part of the original faculty that opened Souhegan High School in Amherst.

He also directed wilderness education programs in northeastern public and private high schools. Balch retired in 2013.

On November 6, 2018, Balch was elected to the New Hampshire House of Representatives where he represented the Hillsborough 38 district from December 5, 2018 until December 1, 2020. Balch is a Democrat. Balch endorsed Bernie Sanders in the 2020 Democratic Party presidential primaries.

== Writing ==
Balch's first book, WITCH, published in 2009, is the autobiographical story of two young children discovering a woman living in a shack on their property in 1950's rural Connecticut. As the children are befriended by the woman, they come to believe she is a witch.

His second book,The PASS, published in 2014 and also autobiographical, tells the story of two young men who embark on a 40-day survival expedition in Wyoming's Rocky Mountains and experience remarkable and unexpected events.

In 2015 he published One Summer, which follows a group of teen-aged friends as they hike Vermont's rugged Long Trail. Two years later, Balch published Making the Case for Direct Action, a non-fiction book that examines the ethics, strategy, and historical role of direct action tactics, including protests, blockades, and acts of sabotage, within social and environmental movements.

In 2020 he released The Rotten Ground, a horror story inspired by an area in Wilton, New Hampshire, that seems to enclose nothing but woods.

== Personal life ==
Chris Balch was born in Brooklyn, New York. He grew up in Redding, Connecticut. Balch resides in Wilton, New Hampshire. Balch is married and has three children.

In May 2022, Balch was charged with criminal mischief and timber trespass by the New Hampshire Division of Forests and Lands for spiking trees in state-owned forests in an effort to prevent logging. On March 4, 2023, Balch was found Not Guilty of all charges.
