= Patrick Long (New Hampshire state representative) =

American politician

Member of the New Hampshire House of Representatives from the Hillsborough 26th district
- Incumbent
- Assumed office December 4, 2024
- Preceded by: Mary Freitas

Personal details
- Born: 1986 or 1987 (age 39–40)
- Party: Democratic
- Education: Bard College, Simon's Rock (BA); Suffolk University (JD)

Patrick N. Long (born 1986/1987) is an American attorney and politician. He serves as a Democratic member for the Hillsborough 26th district of the New Hampshire House of Representatives. He previously served as a Staff Sergeant in the Army National Guard and opened his own legal practice in 2014, Patrick Long Law Firm, PC. He was elected to the New Hampshire House of Representatives from the Hillsborough 26th District on November 5, 2024, assuming office on December 4.

Long shares the same first and last name as Patrick Long (born 1955), a Democratic New Hampshire State Senator also from Manchester.

== Electoral history ==
2024 New Hampshire's 26th Hillsborough District Democratic primary
Party	Candidate	Votes	%
Democratic	Patrick Long	484	59.46
Democratic	Michael Reuschel	325	39.93
Write-in		5	0.61
Total votes		814	100.00%

2024 New Hampshire's 26th Hillsborough District General Election
Party	Candidate	Votes	%
Republican	Brian Cole (incumbent)	1,882	36.03
Democratic	Patrick Long	1,843	35.29
Democratic	Michael Reuschel	1,492	28.57
Write-in		5	0.11
Total votes		5,223	100.00%
