= Francesca Diggs =

American politician

Member of the New Hampshire House of Representatives from the Grafton 16 district
- In office December 5, 2018 – December 2, 2020
- Preceded by: Duane Brown
- Succeeded by: Jeffrey Greeson

Personal details
- Party: Democratic
- Education: University of Mississippi

Francesca Diggs is a New Hampshire politician.

Diggs earned a BA in English from University of Mississippi and did graduate studies in educational psychology.

On November 6, 2018, Diggs was elected to the New Hampshire House of Representatives, represented the Grafton 16 district. She assumed office on December 5, 2018. She is a Democrat. She was defeated in her 2020 reelection bid.

Diggs resides in Rumney, New Hampshire. Diggs is married and has three children.
