= Linda Gould =

American politician

Member of the New Hampshire House of Representatives from the Hillsborough 7th district
- Incumbent
- Assumed office December 2014
- Succeeded by: Sheila Quick (elect)

Personal details
- Party: Republican
- Education: University of New Hampshire (BA)
- Committees: Resources, Recreation, and Development
- Website: www.GouldForBedford.com Campaign Website

Linda Gould is an American politician in the New Hampshire House of Representatives. She currently is one of seven elected state representatives for the Hillsborough-7 district (Bedford, New Hampshire). She was elected for the first time in 2014.

== Background information ==
Before becoming a state representative, Gould was a teacher until 2000, involved with New Hampshire Right to Life and the Bike Walk Alliance of New Hampshire.
