= Marjorie Porter =

American politician

Member of New Hampshire House of Representatives for Hillsborough 1
- In office 2010 – December 7, 2022

Personal details
- Born: Worcester, Massachusetts
- Party: Democratic
- Education: University of Massachusetts Amherst

Marjorie A. Porter is an American politician. She was a member of the New Hampshire House of Representatives and represented Hillsborough's 1st district. Her district contained the towns of Antrim, Bennington, Hillsborough and Windsor. She is an educator by profession.
