= Edith Tucker =

American politician

Member of the New Hampshire House of Representatives from the Coos 5th district
- In office December 7, 2016 – December 7, 2022
- Preceded by: John Tholl
- Succeeded by: Became a multi-member district

Personal details
- Party: Democratic

Edith Tucker is an American politician from the state of New Hampshire. A member of the Democratic Party, she represented Coos District 5 in the New Hampshire House of Representatives from 2016 to 2022.

== Political career ==
Tucker was elected to the New Hampshire House in 2016. She endorsed Elizabeth Warren in the 2020 Democratic Party presidential primaries. Tucker was the Democratic nominee for New Hampshire's 1st State Senate district in 2022, but lost to Republican Carrie Gendreau. Tucker ran in a 2024 special election for Coos House District 6, but lost to Michael Murphy.

== Personal life ==
Tucker lives in Randolph.
