= Nancy Murphy =

American politician

Member of the New Hampshire House of Representatives from the Hillsborough 21st district
- In office December 5, 2018 – December 2, 2020

Member of the New Hampshire House of Representatives from the Hillsborough 12th district
- Incumbent
- Assumed office December 7, 2022

Personal details
- Party: Democratic
- Education: Boston University

Nancy A. Murphy is a New Hampshire politician. She has been a member of the NH House of Representatives for two terms, and was re-elected to a third term on November 5, 2024. In April 2021, Murphy won a seat on the Merrimack town council. She was re-elected in 2024 for a second 3-year term.

== Education ==
Murphy earned a B.S. in nursing from Boston University.

== Professional career ==
On November 6, 2018, Murphy was elected to the New Hampshire House of Representatives where she represents the Hillsborough 21 district. Murphy assumed office on December 5, 2018. Murphy is a Democrat. Murphy endorsed Bernie Sanders in the 2020 Democratic Party presidential primaries.

== Personal life ==
Murphy resides in Merrimack, New Hampshire. Murphy is married and has six children.
