= Susan Almy =

American politician (born 1946)

Member of the New Hampshire House of Representatives from the Grafton 13th district
- Incumbent
- Assumed office 1996

Personal details
- Born: March 28, 1946 (age 80) New York City, New York, U.S.
- Party: Democratic
- Education: Swarthmore College, Stanford University
- Profession: socio-economist

Susan W. Almy (born March 28, 1946) is a Democratic member of the New Hampshire House of Representatives, representing the Grafton 13th District since 1996. As of 2008, she also chairs the board of directors of the New Hampshire Civil Liberties Union, the local affiliate of the American Civil Liberties Union.

== Biography ==
Almy received a BA from Swarthmore College in 1968; and a MA (1969) and PhD in anthropology from Stanford University in 1974. Before starting her tenure in the state house, Almy was an International Agricultural Researcher.

== Political positions ==
=== Same-sex marriage ===
Susan Almy has consistently voted in favor of same-sex marriage. In 2009, Almy voted in favor of bills such as 'Legalizing Same-Sex Marriage', 'Prohibiting Gender Identity Discrimination', and 'Religious Choice in Performing Marriage Ceremonies'. In 2010, she voted to kill several pieces of legislation against same-sex marriage, such as 'Repealing Same-Sex Marriage'. On the New Hampshire State Legislative Election 2010 Political Courage Test, Almy has stated that she does not believe marriage should only be between a man and a woman, and that New Hampshire should continue to grant marriage licenses to same-sex couples.

=== Abortion ===
On the New Hampshire State Legislative Election 2010 Political Courage Test, Almy has stated that she is pro-choice. She has voted accordingly, and in 2010, voted to try to repeal the bill 'Expanding Homicide to Include "Unborn Child"'. According to the NPAT, Almy also does not believe that abortion should only be legal within the first trimester of pregnancy, and that women should be able to have abortions when she is endangered or when the pregnancy resulted from incest or rape.

== Ratings ==
Conservative interest groups generally give Almy a low rating. In 2008, Cornerstone Policy Research, a conservative interest group, gave Almy a rating of 0, as well as in 2007 and 2004. However, liberal interest groups, such as the New Hampshire Citizen's Alliance, give Almy relatively high ratings, such as 96 percent in 2006 and 94 percent in 2002. Because of her views on abortion, NARAL Pro-Choice New Hampshire interest group has given her a rating of 100 percent, while New Hampshire Right to Life rated her at 20 percent.
