= Ken N. Gidge =

American politician

Ken Gidge

Member of the New Hampshire House of Representatives from the Hillsborough 33rd district
- In office 2008 – December 2, 2020
- Succeeded by: Efstathia Booras

Personal details
- Born: May 26, 1946 (age 80) Nashua, New Hampshire, U.S.
- Party: Democratic

Kennith Gidge (born May 26, 1946) is an American politician, artist, and inventor who served as a member of the New Hampshire House of Representatives from the Hillsborough District 33.

== Early life ==
Gidge was born deaf in one ear. As a result, he had to repeat both the first and second grade. His partial deafness was not discovered until he reached third grade. His disability could not be improved with a hearing aid, so his teachers taught him to read lips. This skill helped him finish elementary school and complete his high school studies.

In the 1960s, Gidge moved to Boston to study acting and art. He supported himself by working as a bartender. He eventually quit his studies and returned to Nashua, New Hampshire.

== Career ==
In 1978, Gidge invented two energy saving devices, "Le Door" and "Le Frigidoor". These inventions were marketed nationally and internationally. During this period he became aware that inventions were regularly stolen and decided to try and stop this from happening, so he created a committee called the National Inventors Award Committee to honor inventors and inventions. He hosted then-Vice President, George H. W. Bush and Barbara Bush to come to Nashua for the National Inventors Award Committee's event.

Gidge was elected to the New Hampshire House of Representatives in 2007. He took office in 2008.
