= Kermit Williams =

American politician

Member of the New Hampshire House of Representatives from the Hillsborough 4th district
- In office December 5, 2012 – December 2, 2020
- Succeeded by: Lisa Post

Personal details
- Born: Kermit Roger Williams; January 9, 1954 (age 72) Carthage, New York, U.S.
- Party: Democratic
- Spouse: Cheryl
- Education: Union College (BS)
- Profession: Computer engineer

Kermit Roger Williams (born January 9, 1954) is an American politician in the state of New Hampshire. Who previously served as a member of the New Hampshire House of Representatives, sitting as a Democrat from the Hillsborough 4 district, having been first elected in 2012 and serving until 2020.
