= Laura Pantelakos =

American politician (1935–2025)

Member of the New Hampshire House of Representatives from the Rockingham 25th district
- In office December 6, 1978 – December 7, 2022

Personal details
- Born: August 12, 1935 Bath, Maine, U.S.
- Died: April 7, 2025 (aged 89) Dover, New Hampshire, U.S.
- Party: Democratic
- Children: 7

Laura C. Pantelakos (August 12, 1935 – April 7, 2025) was an American politician in the state of New Hampshire. She was a member of the New Hampshire House of Representatives, sitting as a Democrat from the Rockingham 25 district, from 1978 to 2022. At retirement, she was the longest-serving member of the chamber.

Pantelakos died in Dover, New Hampshire on April 7, 2025, at the age of 89.
