= Brian Sullivan (New Hampshire politician) =

American politician

Member of the New Hampshire House of Representatives from the Sullivan 1st district
- Incumbent
- Assumed office 2017
- Preceded by: Andy Schmidt

Personal details
- Party: Democratic
- Education: Northland College

Brian M. Sullivan is an American politician who has served as a member of the New Hampshire House of Representatives since 2017, representing the Sullivan 1st district.

== Education ==
Sullivan earned a B.S. in biology from Northland College.

== Career ==
On November 7, 2017, Sullivan was elected to the New Hampshire House of Representatives in a special election after the resignation of Andy Schmidt. Sullivan represents the Sullivan 1 district. Sullivan assumed office in 2017. Sullivan is a Democrat.

== Personal life ==
Sullivan resides in Grantham, New Hampshire. Sullivan is married and has three children.
