= Sharon Nordgren =

American politician (1943–2024)

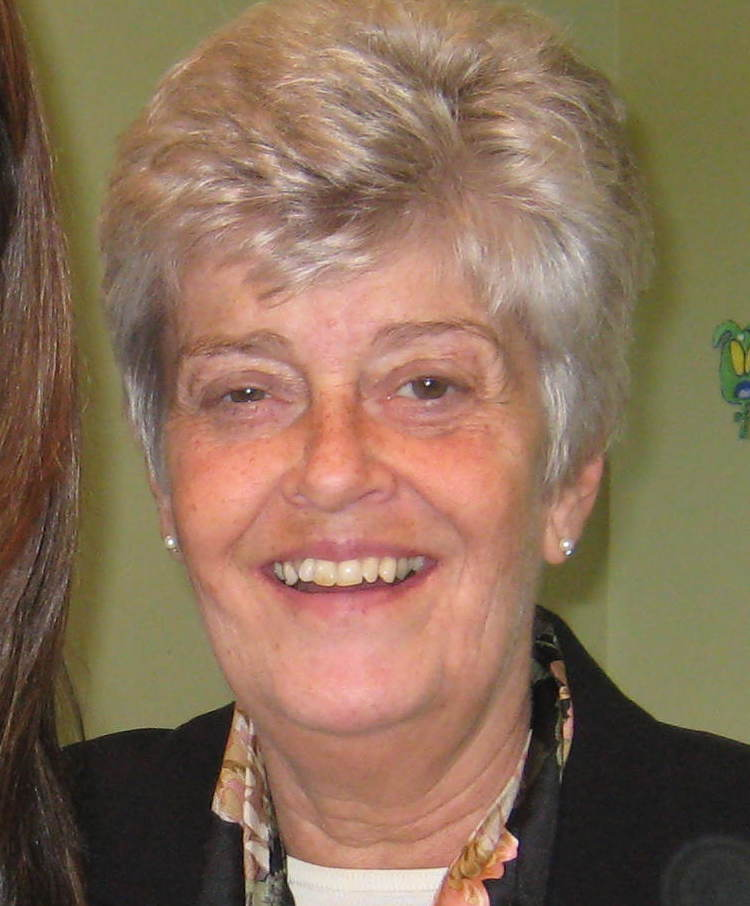

Member of the New Hampshire House of Representatives
- In office 1988 – February 10, 2024
- Constituency: Grafton 12th (2012–2024); 9th (2004–2012); 17th (2002–2004); 10th (1992–2002); 12th (1988–1992)

Personal details
- Born: October 21, 1943 Chicago, Illinois, U.S.
- Died: February 10, 2024 (aged 80)
- Party: Democratic
- Spouse: Richard
- Education: University of Minnesota

Sharon L. Nordgren (October 21, 1943 – February 10, 2024) was an American politician who was a Democratic member of the New Hampshire House of Representatives from Grafton County, serving from 1988 until 2024.

In 2023, Nordgren endorsed both Joyce Craig and Cinde Warmington for New Hampshire governor.

Nordgren died on February 10, 2024, at the age of 80.
