= Cartography of Jerusalem =

Map printing of Jerusalem spanning from ancient times

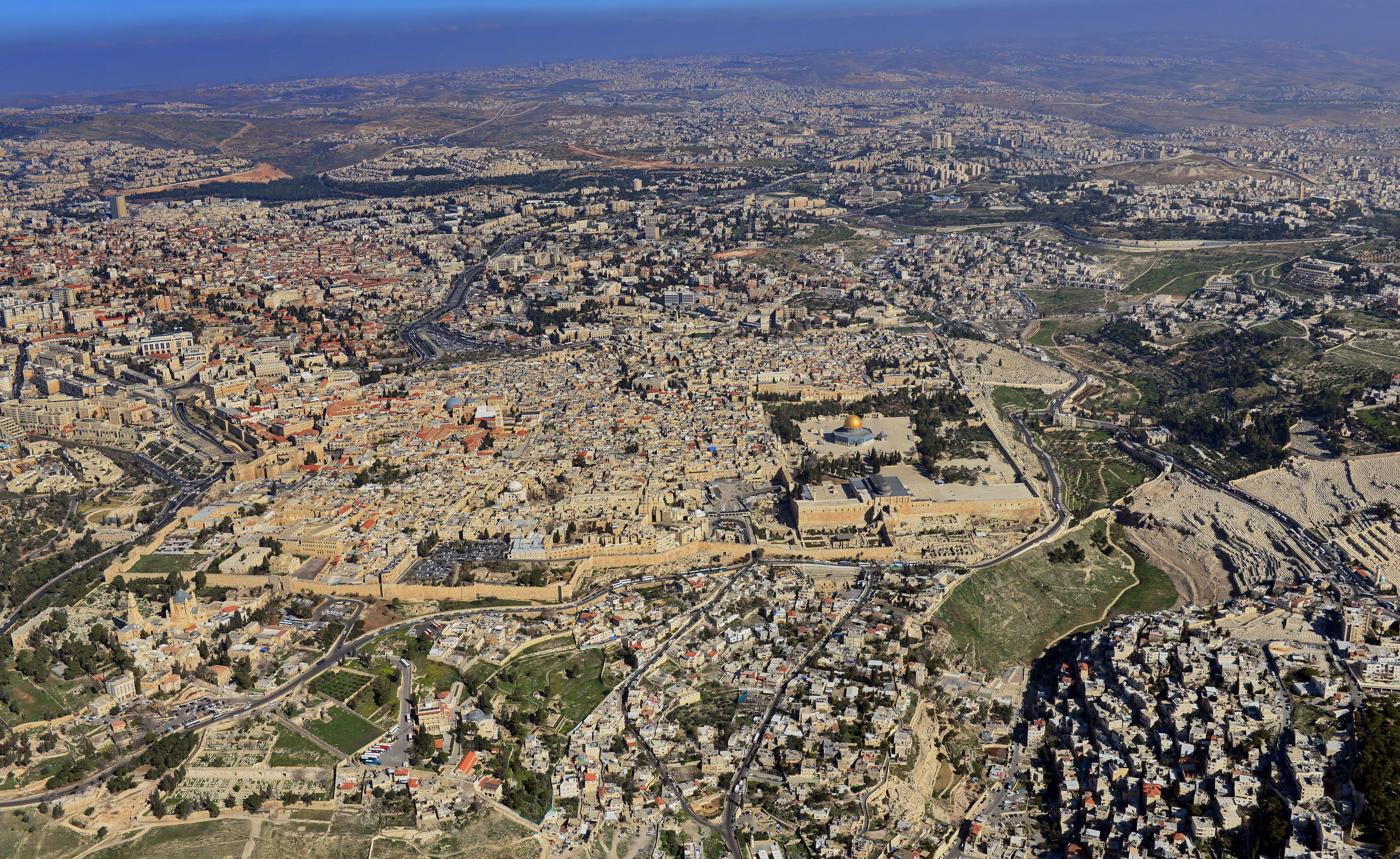
The cartography of Jerusalem prior to modern surveying techniques is focused only on the Old City, shown here. The expansion of the city from the mid-nineteenth century coincided with the production of the first modern map (see the Ordnance Survey map in the list below).

Maps of Jerusalem can be categorised between original factual maps, copied maps and imaginary maps, the latter being based on religious books. The maps were produced in a variety of materials, including parchment, vellum, mosaic, wall paintings and paper. Most extant maps known to scholars from the pre-modern era were prepared by Christian mapmakers for a Christian European audience. All maps marking milestones in the cartography of Jerusalem are listed here following the cartographic histories of the city, from Titus Tobler and Reinhold Röhricht's studies in the 19th century to those of Hebrew University of Jerusalem academics Rehav Rubin and Milka Levy-Rubin in recent decades. The article lists maps that progressed the cartography of Jerusalem before the rise of modern surveying techniques, showing how mapmaking and surveying improved and helped outsiders to better understand the geography of the city. Imaginary maps of the ancient city and copies of existing maps are excluded.

The Madaba Map discovered in modern-day Jordan is the oldest known map of Jerusalem, in the form of a mosaic in a Greek Orthodox Church. At least 12 maps survive from the Catholic mapmakers of the Crusades; they were drawn on vellum and mostly show the city as a circle. Approximately 500 maps are known between the late-1400s and the mid-1800s; the significant increase in number is due to the advent of the printing press. The first printed map of the city was drawn by Erhard Reuwich and published in 1486 by Bernhard von Breydenbach in his Peregrinatio in Terram Sanctam, based on his pilgrimage of 1483. Few of the mapmakers had travelled to Jerusalem – most of the maps were either copies of others' maps or were imaginary (i.e. based on reading of religious texts) in nature. The first map based on actual field measurements was published in 1818 by the Czech mapmaker Franz Wilhelm Sieber. The first map based on modern surveying techniques was published by Charles Wilson in 1864–65 for the British Ordnance Survey.

== Notable maps of Jerusalem ==
=== Early religious (6th–7th centuries) ===
Date	Title	Cartographer	Comments	Image
c. 560–565	Madaba Map	unknown	The earliest known map of Jerusalem, and oldest known geographic floor mosaic in art history. The mosaic was discovered in 1884, but no research was carried out until 1896. It has been heavily used for the localisation and verification of sites in Byzantine Jerusalem, such as the Damascus Gate, the Lions' Gate, the Golden Gate, the Zion Gate, the Church of the Holy Sepulchre and the Tower of David; in 1967, excavations revealed The Nea church and the Cardo Maximus (the road depicted in the map that runs through the centre of Jerusalem) in the locations suggested by the Madaba Map.	The 6th century mosaic of Jerusalem
c. 680	Arculf map	Arculf via Adomnán	Ground plan from the first book of De Locis Sanctis. The map shows relevant Christian sites in relation to each other. The earliest known manuscript dates from the ninth century, two centuries after Arculf's journey. It was the oldest known map of Jerusalem prior to the discovery of the Madaba map. Arculf spent nine months in Jerusalem before transmitting the story of his travels to Adomnán, for the benefit of other pilgrims. Adomnán wrote that Arculf had drawn his maps and plans on wax tablets. Not all the known manuscripts of the text include the maps and plans.	A 7th century black and white drawing of Jerusalem
c. 785	Umm ar-Rasas mosaics	unknown	Part of the mosaic floor at the center of the Umm ar-Rasas Byzantine St. Stephen's church depicting Jerusalem, identifying it as Hagia Polis in Greek, the Holy City. The mosaic floor depicts eight cities west of the Jordan River, Jerusalem being the first one, while the right side depicting seven cities east of the Jordan River, and the inner corners depicting cities of the Nile Delta. The entire mosaic appears to have been completed during the Abbasid Caliphate.	An 8th century Byzantine mosaic of Jerusalem

=== Crusader maps (12th–14th centuries) ===
The Crusader maps were first catalogued in the late 19th century by Reinhold Röhricht; he catalogued eight maps, which he labelled (1) Brüssel, (2) Copenhagen, (3) Florenz?, (4) Haag, (5) München (6) St. Omer, (7) Paris and (8) Stuttgart. Map (3) was later identified as the Uppsala map, and map (5) is the Arculf map (see section above). Today, at least 12 such maps are known.

A majority of the crusader maps are known as "round maps”, showing the city as a perfect circle, considered to symbolize the “ideal city”. These maps have unique features, but they are all related; it is likely that there was an original prototype from which these maps were derived. Four of the earlier round maps are associated with the Gesta Francorum; it has been suggested that illustrating this text may have been the purpose of the prototype round map. All the round maps are east-facing, like the T and O maps of the world to which they show a number of similarities, have five gates in non-symmetrical locations, and show the actual basic street plan of Jerusalem. The maps show two central roads in the shape of a cross, likely to represent the Roman cardo and decumanus, with an additional street leading to Yehoshafat's Gate and – in most but not all – a fourth street starting at St. Stephen's Gate.

Date	Title	Cartographer	Comments	Image
1140s	Cambrai map	unknown	From the Médiathèque d'agglomération de Cambrai. It is considered to be the most accurate of the Crusader maps, highly likely to be based on direct knowledge. The walls of the city are shown in the shape of a rhomboid, from an elevation perspective. The map provides names for gates and towers, shows some main streets, and marks the main buildings and churches. The Holy Sephulchre is shown in its new Crusader form and labelled "Anastasis", the Al Aqsa Mosque is labelled "Domus Militum Templi", and numerous eastern churches are shown – Mar Saba, Chariton's lavra, St George, St Abraham, St Bartholomew, and the Jacobite church of St Mary Magdalene.	A 12th century sketch drawing of Jerusalem
c. 1150	Brussels map	unknown	A round map in decorative style with miniatures of pilgrims. The map is from the Royal Library of Belgium, dated to the mid 12th century.	A 12th century diagram of Jerusalem in a round shape
c. 1170	Hague map	unknown	The most famous of eleven round Crusader maps. The map is in decorative style with miniatures of fighting crusaders.	A 12th century diagram of Jerusalem in a round shape
1100s	Paris map	unknown	A round map with detailed pictures of buildings. It is one of four crusader maps with a connection to the Gesta Francorum, from a copy of the Liber Floridus held in the Bibliothèque nationale de France it carries part of the text from the Gesta Francorum around and within the map. Thought to be from the 12th century.	A 12th century diagram of Jerusalem in a round shape
1100s	Uppsala map	unknown	Another of the four round maps with a connection to the Gesta Francorum. It is located in a manuscript between Robert the Monk's Historia Hierosolymitana and the Gesta Francorum (presented as the 10th book of the Historia Hierosolymitana), held in the Uppsala University Library. It was rediscovered in 1995.	A 12th century diagram of Jerusalem in a round shape
1100s	Saint Omer map	unknown	A round map from a copy of the Gesta Francorum held in the French town of Saint-Omer.	A 12th century diagram of Jerusalem in a round shape
c. 1200	London map	unknown	From a miscellaneous set of manuscripts in the British Library. It is another of the four round maps with a connection to the Gesta Francorum; it carries part of the text from the Gesta Francorum around and within the map.	A 12th century diagram of Jerusalem and the Holy Land with the city in a round shape
c. 1200	Codex Harley map	unknown	From the British Library's Harleian Library. The map represents the itinerary of a pilgrim, with Jerusalem as its highlight. It is unrelated to the other round maps, as it has only four symmetrical gates, and has no crossroads. The map "has no pretense of accuracy", but rather presents "the author's conception of his journey".	A 12th century diagram of Jerusalem and the Holy Land with the city in a round shape
c. 1200s	Montpellier map	unknown	Held in the University of Montpellier library. The map is north-facing, is the only crusader map in a square shape, and includes a description of crusader forces arrayed outside the walls of the city. The sites identified on the map – various sites of the Passion of Jesus, the site where Helena found the cross, and the navel of the earth – are in locations "only remotely related to reality".	A 13th century diagram of Jerusalem in a square shape
c. 1250	Matthew Paris map	Matthew Paris	Pilgrimage map from Chronica Majora. It is likely to have been based on a set of itineraries.	A 13th century drawing of Jerusalem
1300s	Copenhagen map	unknown	A round map in northern European style. The annotations were probably made by Haukr Erlendsson.	A 14th century diagram of Jerusalem in a round shape
1300s	Stuttgart map	unknown	A round map from the Württembergische Landesbibliothek. It was originally acquired from the Zwiefalten Abbey, and is thought to be from the 14th century.	A 14th century diagram of Jerusalem in a round shape
1321	Sanudo-Vesconte map	Pietro Vesconte	Published in Liber Secretorum. The work was intended to rekindle the spirit of the crusades. It is considered likely that the cartography dates from prior to the Crusaders' final loss of Jerusalem in 1244. The map focuses on the city's water supply. The map ”has no obvious precursor” in map form; it is thought to have used texts from Josephus and Burchard of Mount Sion.	A 14th century sketch of Jerusalem

=== Notable 15th–18th century maps ===
Date	Title	Cartographer	Comments	Image
1472	Comminelli map	Pietro del Massaio	Map prepared for Alfonso II of Naples. It was one of a number of maps to accompany Jacopo d'Angelo's Latin translation of Ptolemy's Geography, copied by French copyist Hugo Comminelli and illustrated by the Florentine cartographer Pietro del Massaio. It is considered a "realistic" map, but includes a number of imaginary historical elements. Contemporary elements in the map include the Muristan, labelled "Hospicium Peregrinorum" and the Dome of the Rock with an Islamic crescent on top, labelled "Templum Solomonis", whilst imaginary elements include the centre of the world ("mundi medium") located at the Holy Sepulchre.	A detailed map of Jerusalem from the 15th century
1475	Rieter map	Sebald Rieter	Considered to be the first known "Franciscan map" of Jerusalem. The map depicts Jerusalem from the viewpoint of the Mount of Olives. The Franciscan order, which had been appointed by the Vatican as custodians of the Holy Places in 1342, was devoted to spreading knowledge of the city. Many of the city's primary buildings are drawn "fairly accurately". Rieter and his companion Hans Tucher were pilgrims from Nuremberg; the text is a mixture of Latin and Italian. The al-Aqsa Mosque is labeled as the "Church of the Saracens" (Ecclesie Sarazeni).	A detailed map of Jerusalem from the 15th century
1483–86	Reuwich map	Erhard Reuwich	First printed map of Jerusalem. It was published by Bernhard von Breydenbach in Mainz (where the printing press had been invented) in his Peregrinatio in Terram Sanctam. The map is set "vastly out of scale" in a map of the wider Holy Land.	A detailed map of Jerusalem from the 15th century
1578	de Angelis map	Friar Antonino de Angelis	The most influential Franciscan map of Jerusalem, copied by numerous subsequent mapmakers. The map, engraved by Mario Cartaro and printed at the Santa Maria in Ara Coeli in Rome, was rediscovered in 1981.	A detailed map of Jerusalem from the 16th century
1608	Willenberg map	Johann Willenberg	Published in Kryštof Harant's Journey from Bohemia to the Holy Land, by way of Venice and the Sea. It was the first Czech travelogue of Palestine; Harant measured the Holy Sepulchre in detail, comparing it to Prague's St. Vitus Cathedral.	A detailed map of Jerusalem from the 17th century
1620	Amico map	Bernardino Amico	A corrected version of the de Angelis map. The map was made by de Angelis's successor as the official Franciscan mapmaker. The work was published in 1620 in a detailed survey of the Holy Land Trattato delle Piante & Imagini de Sacri Edificii di Terra Santa, disegnate in Gierusalemme [Treatise on the Plans & Images of Sacred Buildings of the Holy Land, drawn in Jerusalem].	A detailed map of Jerusalem from the 17th century
1621	Deshayes map	Louis Deshayes	The first printed map to map to present the city from a vertical bird's-eye view. The work was published in 1624, in Voyage du Levant, fait par le commandement du roi en 1621, detailing Deshayes' journey to the region under the orders of Louis XIII.	A detailed map of Jerusalem from the 17th century
1634	Munich map	unknown	Proskynetarion produced in Jerusalem and Mar Saba. It is the oldest known 17th and 18th century Greek Orthodox map of Jerusalem. The author is identified as a Jerusalem-based monk from Crete named Akakios (Ἀκακίου ἱερομοναχοῦ τοῦ Κρητὸς). Like most such Greek Orthodox maps, the Church of the Holy Sepulchre is a central and outsized component of the map. The map is a south-facing birds eye-view of an oval-shaped Jerusalem, showing realistic depictions of a number of the city's main buildings. The Islamic crescent is shown on top of a number of structures, including the Dome of the Rock.	A detailed map of Jerusalem from the 17th century
1728	De-Pierre Map	De Pierre	Considered to be a comparatively accurate depiction, with an unusual focus on Christian monasteries in and around Jerusalem. The map was drawn by an otherwise unknown pilgrim from Vienna, signed De Pierre Eques S.S. Sepulchri. It is likely to have been copied from a map published in the same year by Patriarch Chrysanthus of Jerusalem. The map was dedicated to empress Elisabeth Christine, the wife of Charles VI, Holy Roman Emperor.	A detailed map of Jerusalem from the 18th century

=== Notable 19th century maps ===
Date	Title	Cartographer	Comments	Image
1818	Sieber map	Franz Sieber	First map based on actual field measurements. It has been described as "the first modern mapping" of Jerusalem. The map was based on 200 accurate and precise geometric points, such that the wall, the Kidron valley and certain mosques were shown correctly, but some city streets and valleys were not drawn correctly, some buildings and some features were included where they did not exist.	A detailed map of Jerusalem from the 19th century
1835	Catherwood map	Frederick Catherwood	Second map based on actual field measurements, and the first to have used measurements for the interior of the Temple Mount. Travel to the region became easier after the 1831–33 Egyptian–Ottoman War; the survey of the area undertaken by Catherwood and his companions Joseph Bonomi and Francis Arundale was to be "the first important contribution to knowledge of the area" for the subsequent flood of travellers to the area. Catherwood supplemented a general survey with a detailed outline of the city recorded with a Camera lucida, prepared from the roof of the House of Pontius Pilate. Although never published in book form, Catherwood's maps were used frequently by other scholars, notably in Edward Robinson's Biblical Researches.	A detailed map of Jerusalem from the 19th century
1841	Royal Engineers map	Edward Aldrich and Julian Symonds	Created during the Oriental Crisis of 1840. The map was published in 1849 with permission of the Master-General of the Ordnance, the Marquess of Anglesey. The map was printed privately for the Board of Ordnance in August 1841, and was published in a reduced form in Alderson's ‘’Professional Papers of the Royal Engineers’’ in 1845 and subsequently as a supplement to the 1849 second edition of George Williams’ The Holy City: Historical, Topographical, and Antiquarian Notices of Jerusalem together with a 130-page memoir on the plan. The memoir contained a three-page appendix defending the plan from criticism by Edward Robinson.	A detailed map of Jerusalem from the 19th century
1845	Kiepert map	Heinrich Kiepert	Based on the Royal Engineers' map, together with data from Ernst Gustav Schultz, who had been the Prussian consul since 1842. It was published as part of Schultz's lecture to the Gesellschaft für Erdkunde zu Berlin. It shows the contemporary city with biblical overlays.	A detailed map of Jerusalem from the 19th century
1858	Van de Velde map	Charles van de Velde	One of the most accurate maps published prior to the Ordnance Survey. Van de Velde met Titus Tobler in Switzerland in 1855, where they agreed to make a new map of Jerusalem based on combining Tobler's own measurements with the flawed Royal Engineers map of 1840–41. Tobler published a 26-page memoir to accompany the map.	A detailed map of Jerusalem from the 19th century
1864–65	Ordnance Survey of Jerusalem	Charles Wilson	First map using modern surveying techniques, and the first Ordnance Survey to take place outside the United Kingdom. It produced "the first perfectly accurate map [of Jerusalem], even in the eyes of modern cartography", and identified the eponymous Wilson's Arch. The survey provided the foundation and impetus for the creation of the Palestine Exploration Fund. The cost of providing the Royal Engineers surveyors was covered by the British Government's War Office, while the survey itself was funded by Angela Burdett-Coutts.	A detailed technical ordnance survey map of Jerusalem from the 19th century
1873	Illés Relief	Stephen Illés	The first scientific relief model of the city. It was constructed between 1864 and 1873 for the 1873 Vienna World's Fair, from molten and beaten zinc at 1:500 scale. It was displayed for more than 40 years at Geneva's Calvinium, when it was moved into storage in 1920 to make way for the League of Nations; rediscovered in 1984, it has been exhibited at the Tower of David Museum in Jerusalem since the 1990s.	A three-dimensional model of Jerusalem from the 19th century

== See also ==
- Schick models of Jerusalem
- Holyland Model of Jerusalem
- Cartography of Palestine

== Bibliography ==
- Amico, Bernardino (1620). Trattato Delle Piante & Immagini de Sacri Edifizi Di Terra Santa: Disegnate in Ierusalemme Secondo Le Regole Della Prospettiua, & Uera Misura Della Lor Grandezza Dal R. P. F. Bernardino Amico; Stampate in Roma E Di Nuouo Ristampate Dallistesso Autore in Piu Piccola Forma, Aggiuntoni la Strada Dolorosa, & Altre Figure. P. Cecconcelli. pp. 8–. OCLC 166138102.
- Ben-Arieh, Yehoshua [in Hebrew] (1974). "The Catherwood Map of Jerusalem". The Quarterly Journal of the Library of Congress. 31 (3): 150–160. JSTOR 29781591.
- Berger, Pamela (7 June 2012). The Crescent on the Temple: The Dome of the Rock as Image of the Ancient Jewish Sanctuary. BRILL. pp. 15–. ISBN 978-90-04-20300-6.
- Edson, Evelyn (26 April 2012). "Jerusalem under Siege: Marino Sanudo's Map of the Water Supply, 1320". In Lucy Donkin and Hanna Vorholt (ed.). Imagining Jerusalem in the Medieval West. OUP/British Academy. doi:10.5871/bacad/9780197265048.003.0008. ISBN 978-0-19-726504-8.
- Foliard, Daniel (13 April 2017). Dislocating the Orient: British Maps and the Making of the Middle East, 1854-1921. University of Chicago Press. ISBN 978-0-226-45147-3.
- Goren, Haim; Faehndrich, Jutta; Schelhaas, Bruno (28 February 2017). Mapping the Holy Land: The Foundation of a Scientific Cartography of Palestine. Bloomsbury Publishing. ISBN 978-0-85772-785-5.
- Goren, Haim (25 April 2017). "The Historical Emergence of Replication". In Ayelet Shavit and Aaron M. Ellison (ed.). Stepping in the Same River Twice: Replication in Biological Research. Yale University Press. ISBN 978-0-300-22803-8.
- Harvey, Paul D. A. (1987). "Local and regional cartography in medieval Europe" (PDF). The History of Cartography; Volume 1: Cartography in Prehistoric, Ancient and Medieval Europe and the Mediterranean. University of Chicago Press. ISBN 978-0-226-31633-8.
- Jones, Yolande (1973). "British Military Surveys of Palestine and Syria 1840-1841" (PDF). The Cartographic Journal. 10 (1): 29–41. Bibcode:1973CartJ..10...29J. doi:10.1179/caj.1973.10.1.29. Archived from the original (PDF) on 2019-12-26.
- Levy-Rubin, Milka (1995). "The Rediscovery of the Uppsala Map of Crusader Jerusalem". Zeitschrift des Deutschen Palästina-Vereins. 111 (2): 162–167. JSTOR 27931522.
- Levy-Rubin, Milka; Rubin, Rehav (1996). "The Image of the Holy City: Maps and Mapping of Jerusalem". In Nitza Rosovsky (ed.). City of the Great King: Jerusalem from David to the Present. Harvard University Press. ISBN 978-0-674-36708-1.
- Moscrop, John James (1 January 2000). Measuring Jerusalem: The Palestine Exploration Fund and British Interests in the Holy Land. A&C Black. pp. 22–. ISBN 978-0-7185-0220-1.
- Röhricht, Reinhold (1892). "Karten und Pläne zur Palästinakunde aus dem 7. bis 16. Jahrhundert". Zeitschrift des Deutschen Palästina-Vereins. 15: 34–39. JSTOR 27928617.
- Rubin, Rehav (2013). "Greek-Orthodox maps of Jerusalem from the seventeenth and eighteenth centuries" (PDF). E-Perimetron. 8 (3): 106–132. Archived from the original (PDF) on 2018-04-21.
- Rubin, Rehav (2008). "Sacred space and mythic time in the early printed maps of Jerusalem". In Tamar Mayer and Suleiman A. Mourad (ed.). Jerusalem: Idea and Reality. Routledge. pp. 47–66. ISBN 978-1-134-10287-7.
- Rubin, Rehav (2007). "Stephan Illes and His 3d Model-Map of Jerusalem (1873)". The Cartographic Journal. 44 (1): 71–79. Bibcode:2007CartJ..44...71R. doi:10.1179/000870407X173841. S2CID 128445503.
- Rubin, Rehav (2006). "One city, different views: A comparative study of three pilgrimage maps of Jerusalem". Journal of Historical Geography. 32 (2): 267–290. doi:10.1016/j.jhg.2005.05.001.
- Siew, Tsafra (2008). "Representations of Jerusalem in Christian European maps from the 6th to the 16th centuries: a comparative tool for reading the message of a map in its cultural context". European Forum at the Hebrew University. CiteSeerX 10.1.1.541.4700.
- Součková, Milada (1980). Baroque in Bohemia. Department of Slavic Languages and Literatures, University of Michigan. p. 21. ISBN 978-0-930042-31-8.
- Tishby, Ariel (2001). Holy Land in Maps. Israel Museum. ISBN 978-0-8478-2412-0.
- Tobler, Titus (1858). Planography of Jerusalem: memoir to accompany the new ground-plan of the city of Jerusalem and the environs, constructed anew by C.W.M. Vande Velde. Justus Perthes. OCLC 32438140.
- Tsafrir, Yoram (1999). "The Holy City of Jerusalem in the Madaba map" (PDF). In Michele Piccirillo and Eugenio Alliata (ed.). The Madaba Map centenary, 1897-1997: travelling through the Byzantine Umayyad period. Studium Biblicum Franciscanum. pp. 155–163. OCLC 488504247.
- Williams, George (1849). "Supplement: Memoir on the Plan of Jerusalem". The Holy City: Historical, Topographical, and Antiquarian Notices of Jerusalem. J.W. Parker. pp. 1–130.
- Wilson, Charles William (1865). Ordnance Survey of Jerusalem, 1:2500, 1:10,000. H.M. Stationery Office. OCLC 223299173.
