= Deshayes =

Deshayes is a surname of French origin.

- André-Jean-Jacques Deshayes (1777–1846), French ballet dancer and choreographer
- Arnouph Deshayes de Cambronne (1768–1846), French governor
- Catherine Deshayes, widow Monvoisin, known as "La Voisin" (c. 1640–1680), a French sorceress
- Émile Deshayes de Marcère (1828–1918), French politician
- Gérard Paul Deshayes (1795–1875), a French geologist and conchologist
- Jean-Baptiste-Henri Deshays or Deshayes (1729–1765), a French painter
- Karine Deshayes (born 1973), French mezzo-soprano
- Louis Deshayes, Baron de Courmemin (1600–1632), French diplomat
- Prosper-Didier Deshayes (mid 18th century–1815), an opera composer and dancer who lived and worked in France.
- François-Georges Fouques Deshayes, known as Desfontaines or Desfontaines-Lavallée (1733–1825), a French writer and playwright

== See also ==
- Deshaies (surname)
- Jean-Baptiste-Henri Deshays (1729–1765), French painter
- Patrick Deshaye (1912–1964), Canadian lawyer and politician
