= Deshaies (surname) =

Deshaies is a French surname. Notable people with this name include:

- Arthur Deshaies (1920–2011), American printmaker and painter
- Bernard Deshaies (born 1953), Canadian politician
- Brodie Deshaies (born 1999), American politician
- Jim Deshaies (born 1960), American baseball pitcher and television broadcaster
- Josée Deshaies, French-Canadian cinematographer
- Raymond J. Deshaies (born 1961), American biochemist

== See also ==
- Deshaies, a commune in Guadeloupe, French Caribbean
- Deshayes (surname)
- Brandun DeShay (born 1990), American rapper
