= Edith DesMarais =

American politician

Member of the New Hampshire House of Representatives from the Carroll 6 district
- In office June 7, 2017 – December 2, 2020
- Preceded by: Harold Parker
- Succeeded by: Brodie Deshaies

Personal details
- Party: Democratic
- Education: Portland High School; Gorham State Teacher's College

Edith DesMarais is a New Hampshire politician.

== Education ==
DesMarais graduated from Portland High School in Maine. DesMarais attended Gorham State Teacher's College, now known as the University of Southern Maine.

== Career ==
In 2017, DesMarais was elected to the New Hampshire House of Representatives where she represents the Carroll 6 district. She assumed office on June 7, 2017. She is a Democrat.

== Personal life ==
DesMarais resides in Wolfeboro, New Hampshire. DesMarais is married and has four children.
