= De-Pierre Map =

Ancient Jerusalem Map

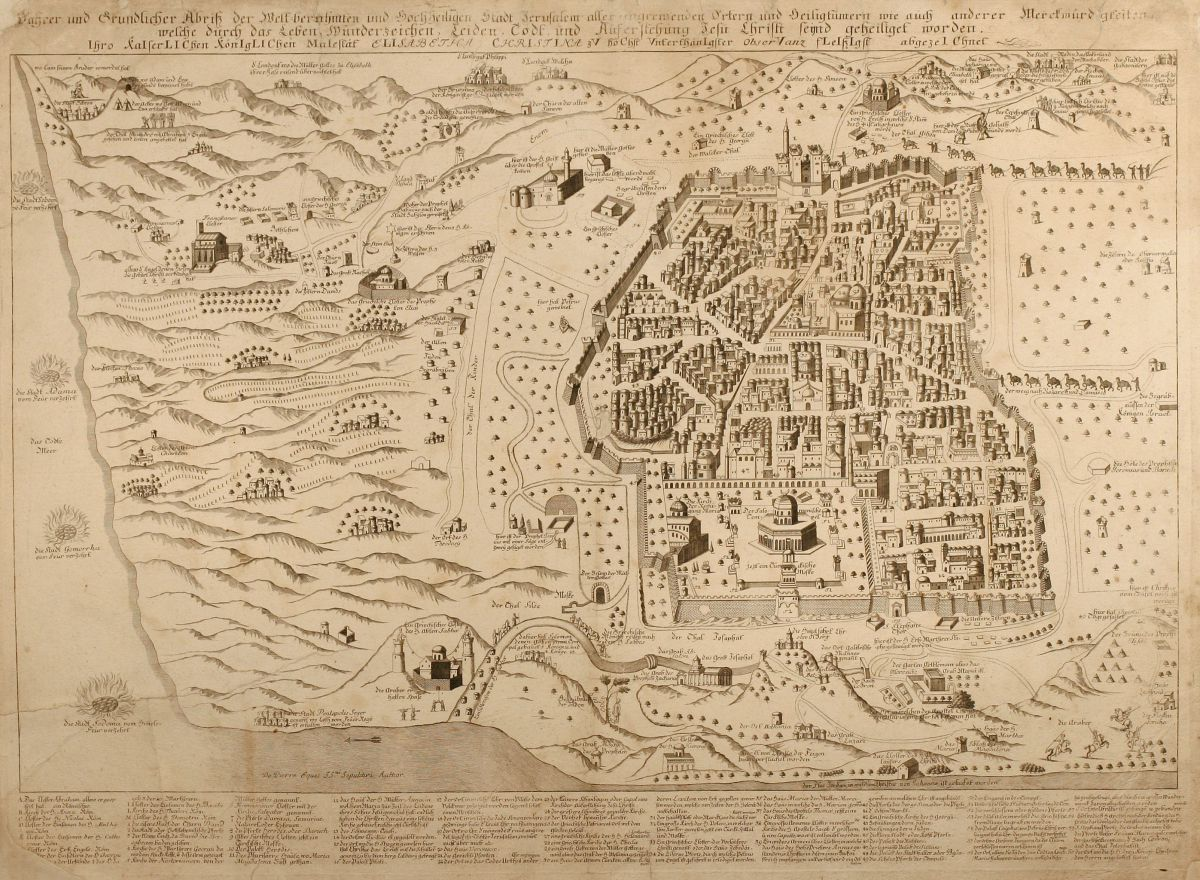
De-Pierre Map

De-Pierre Map is an ancient map of the city of Jerusalem which was drawn by and signed in Latin : De Pierre Eques SSmi Sepulchri in 1728 . De Pierre a French pilgrim an Equestrian Knight of the Holy Sepulchre.

Today the map is found within the Eran Laor maps collection in the National Library of Israel in Jerusalem.

== Description ==
The map provides a detailed description of the old city of Jerusalem, with an accurate description of the ancient city's wall which was built by Suleiman the Magnificent, of the Temple Mount structures, and of the Tower of David. The structures surrounding the ancient city and the locations of the ancient city's streets are illustrated freely. The perspective onto the city is the view from the Mount of Olives (namely from east to west). At the bottom of the map appears an illustration of the Jordan River, and on the map's left side an illustration of the Dead Sea area.

The map also exhibits historical and biblical events, such as Avshalom the son of Israeli king David hanging from a tree, two of The Twelve Spies holding a cluster of grapes, the battle of David and Goliath, Abraham's three visitors, and the Star of Bethlehem.

The map was dedicated to empress Elisabeth Christine, the wife of Charles VI, Holy Roman Emperor.

The dimension of the map is 84.3 by 53.4 centimeters.
