= Umm ar-Rasas mosaics =

8th-century mosaic representation of the Holy Land and Egypt

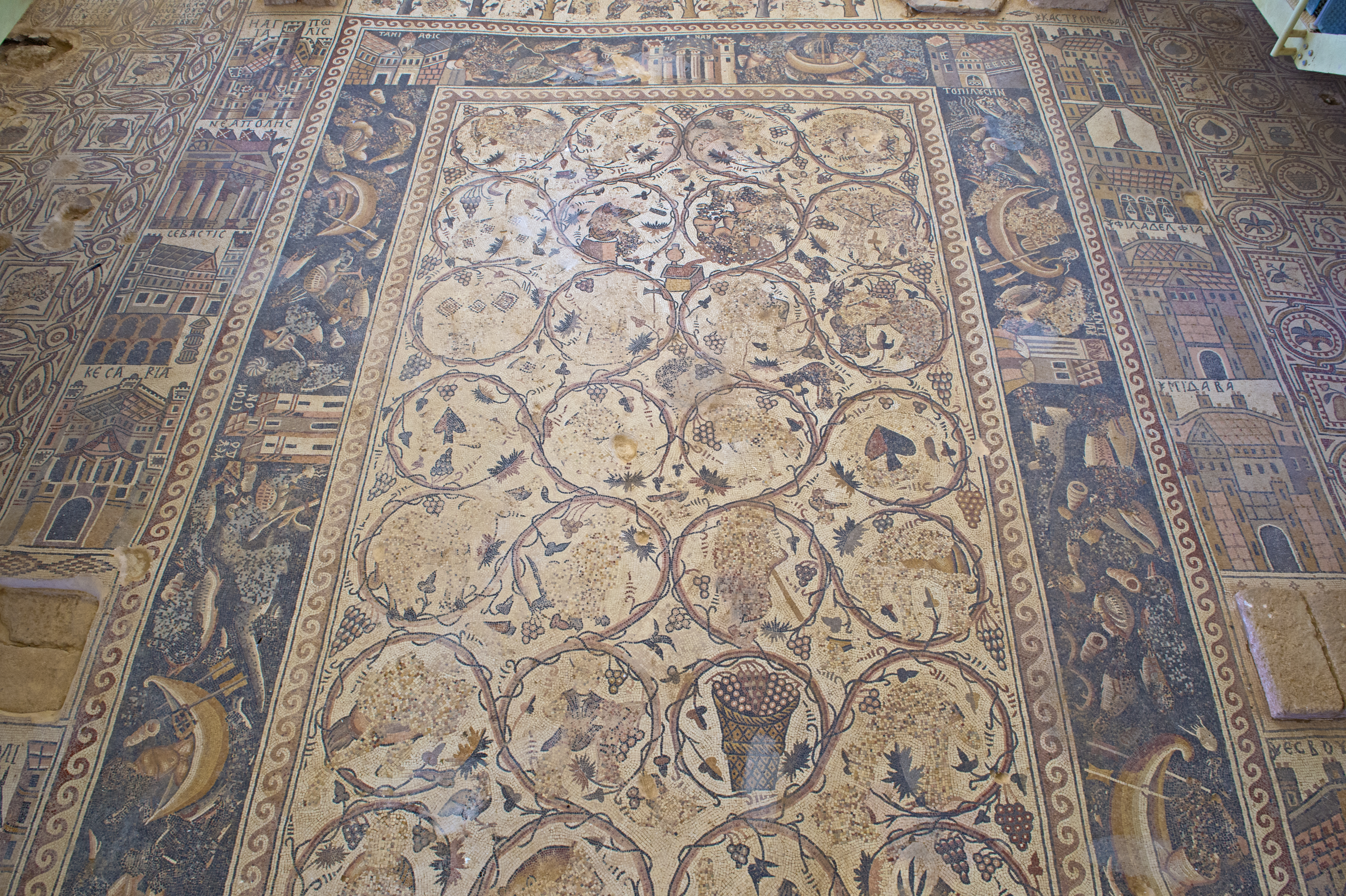
Mosaic at the Church of St. Stephen, Umm ar-Rasas

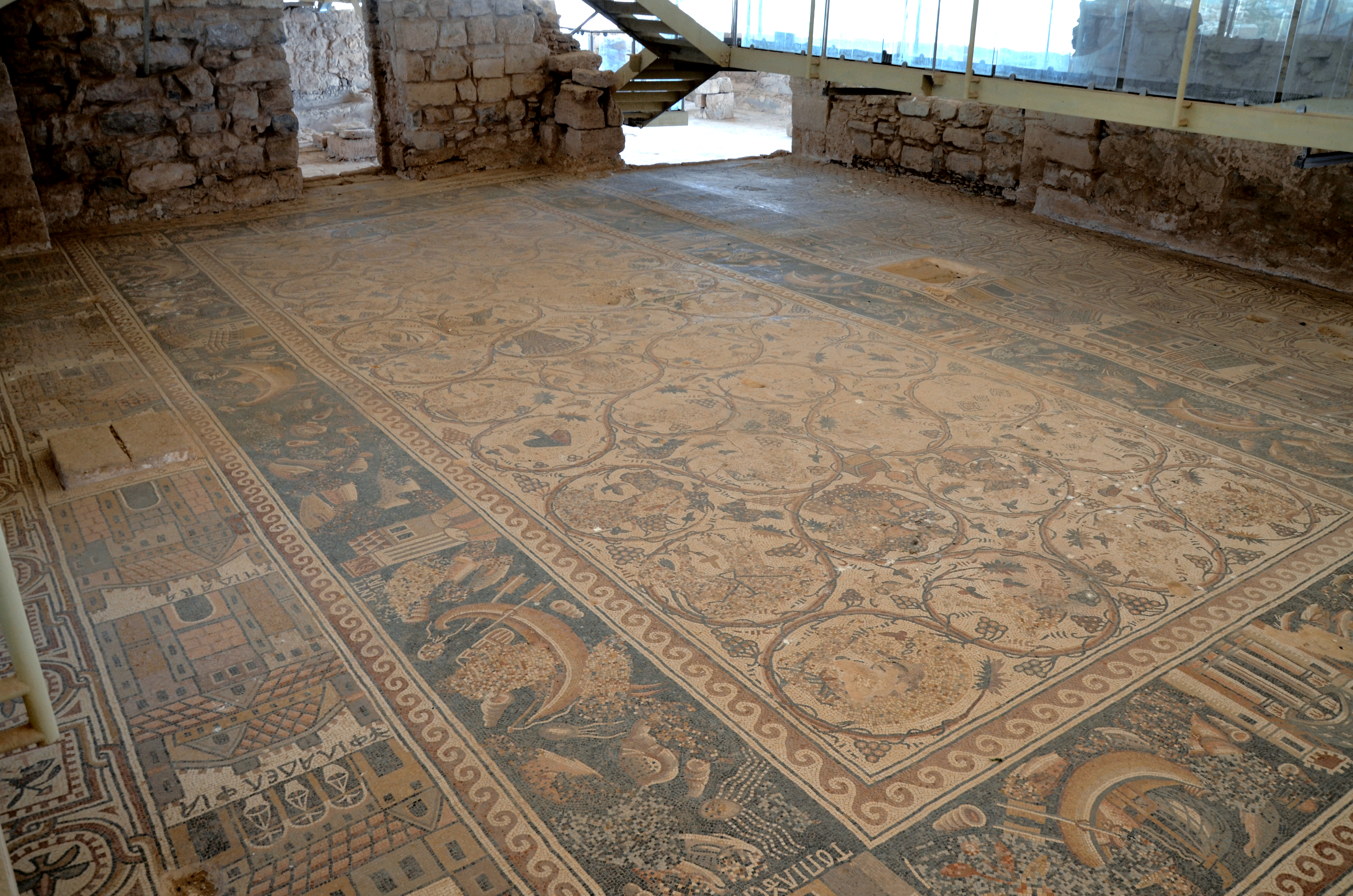
Mosaic at the Church of St. Stephen, Umm ar-Rasas

The Umm ar-Rasas mosaics are a number of Byzantine mosaics discovered by Michele Piccirillo in the ruins of the Church of St. Stephen in Umm ar-Rasas, Jordan, in 1986.

Of particular note is a mosaic floor dated to 785, the largest one in Jordan, with a series of panels depicting the most important cities of the region.

== Town mosaic ==
=== Outer frame, left (northern) side ===
A series of eight cities in Palestine are shown in the frame:

- Jerusalem (Hagia-polis [Holy City])
- Nablus (Neapolis)
- Sebastia (Sebastis)
- Caesarea
- Lydda (Diospolis)
- Bayt Jibrin (Eleutheropolis)
- Ascalon (Askalon)
- Gaza
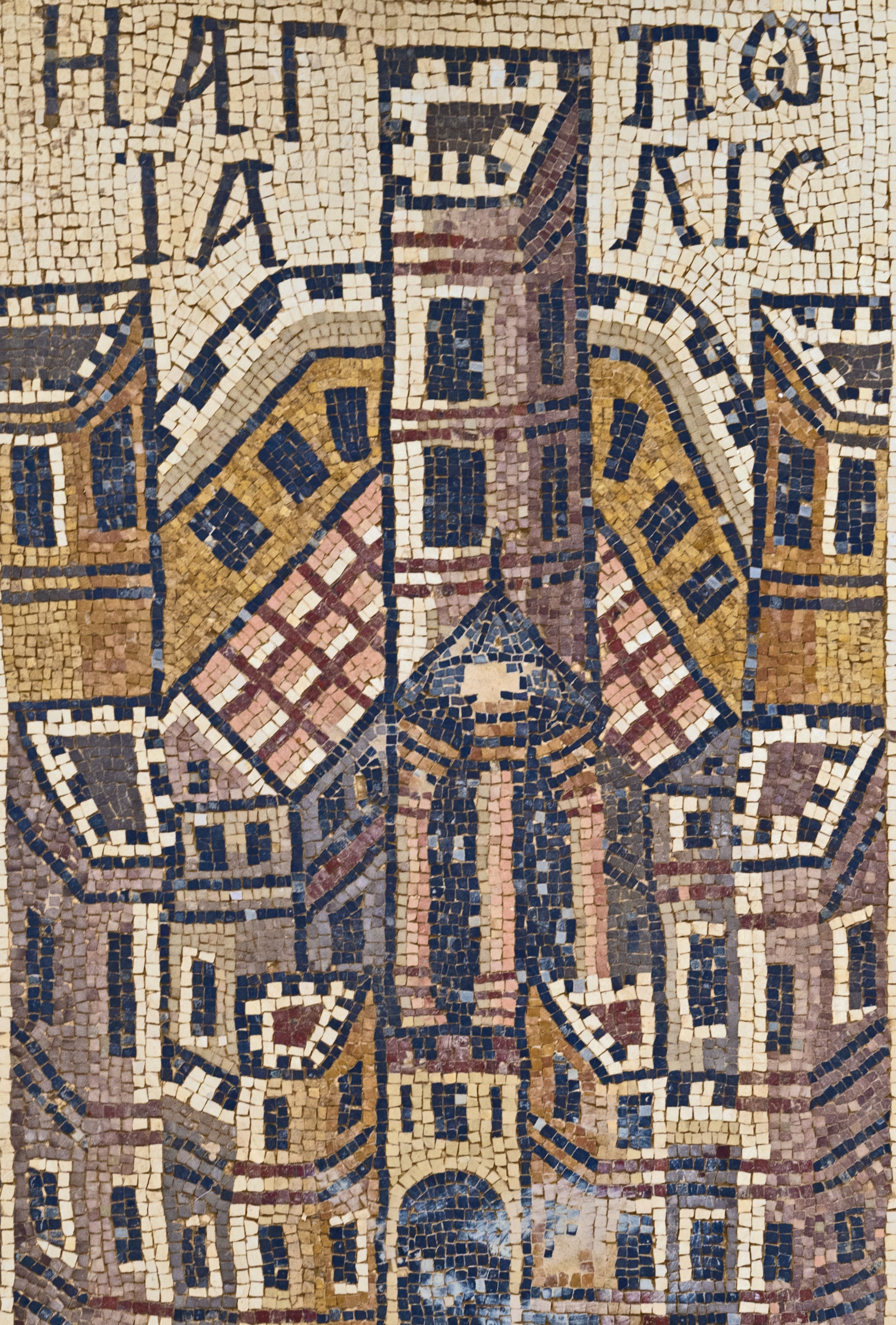
Jerusalem

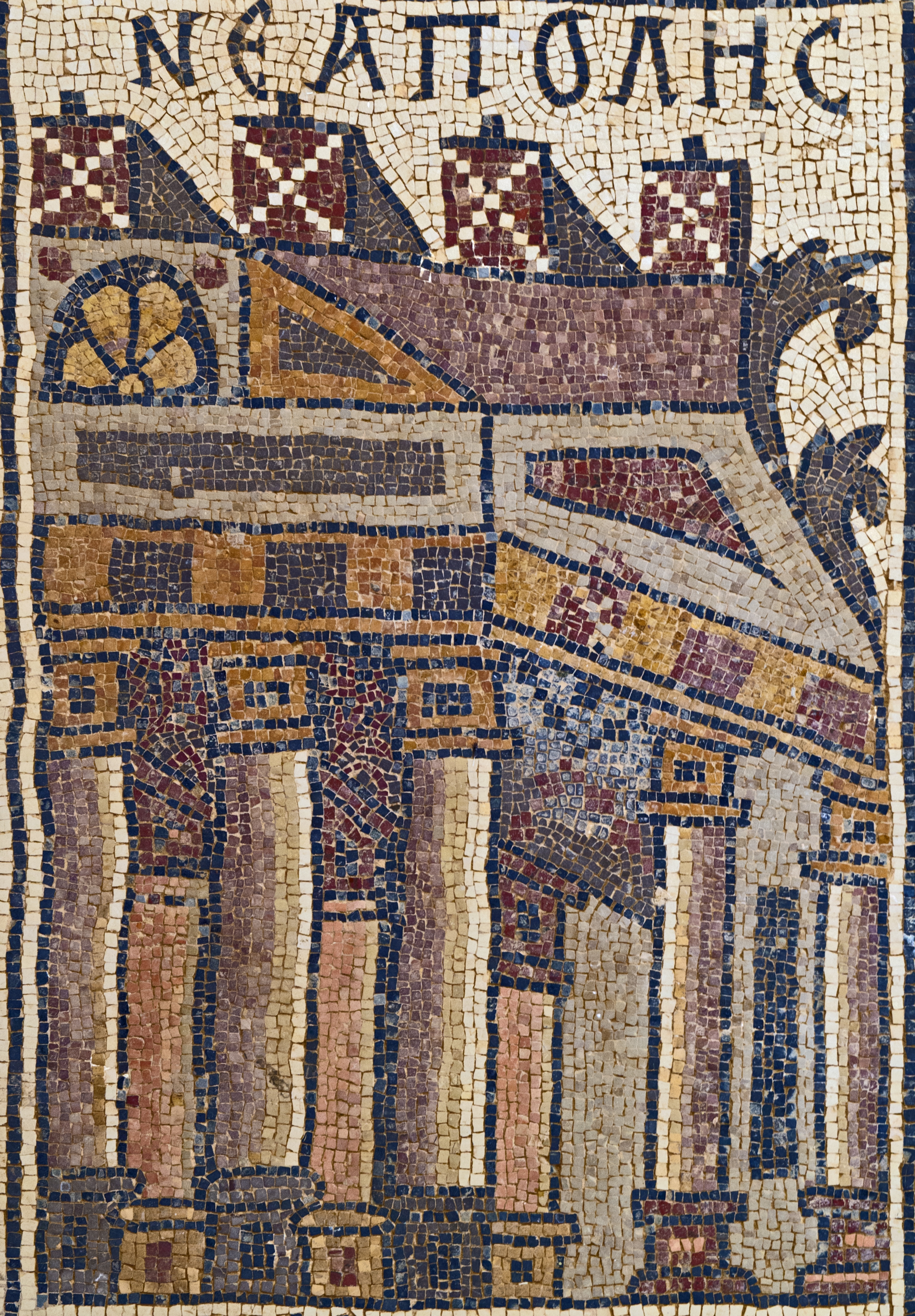
Nablus

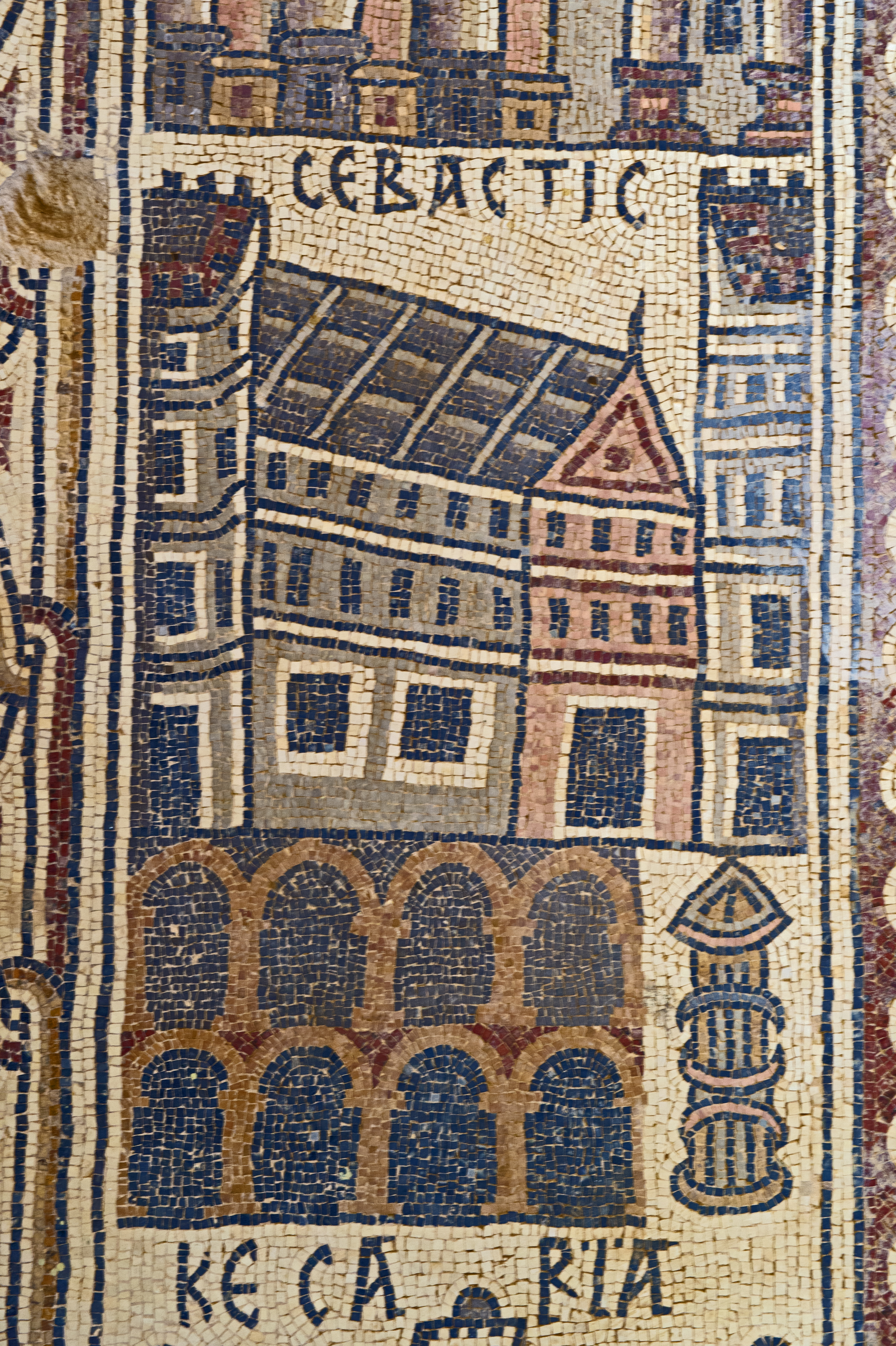
Sebastia

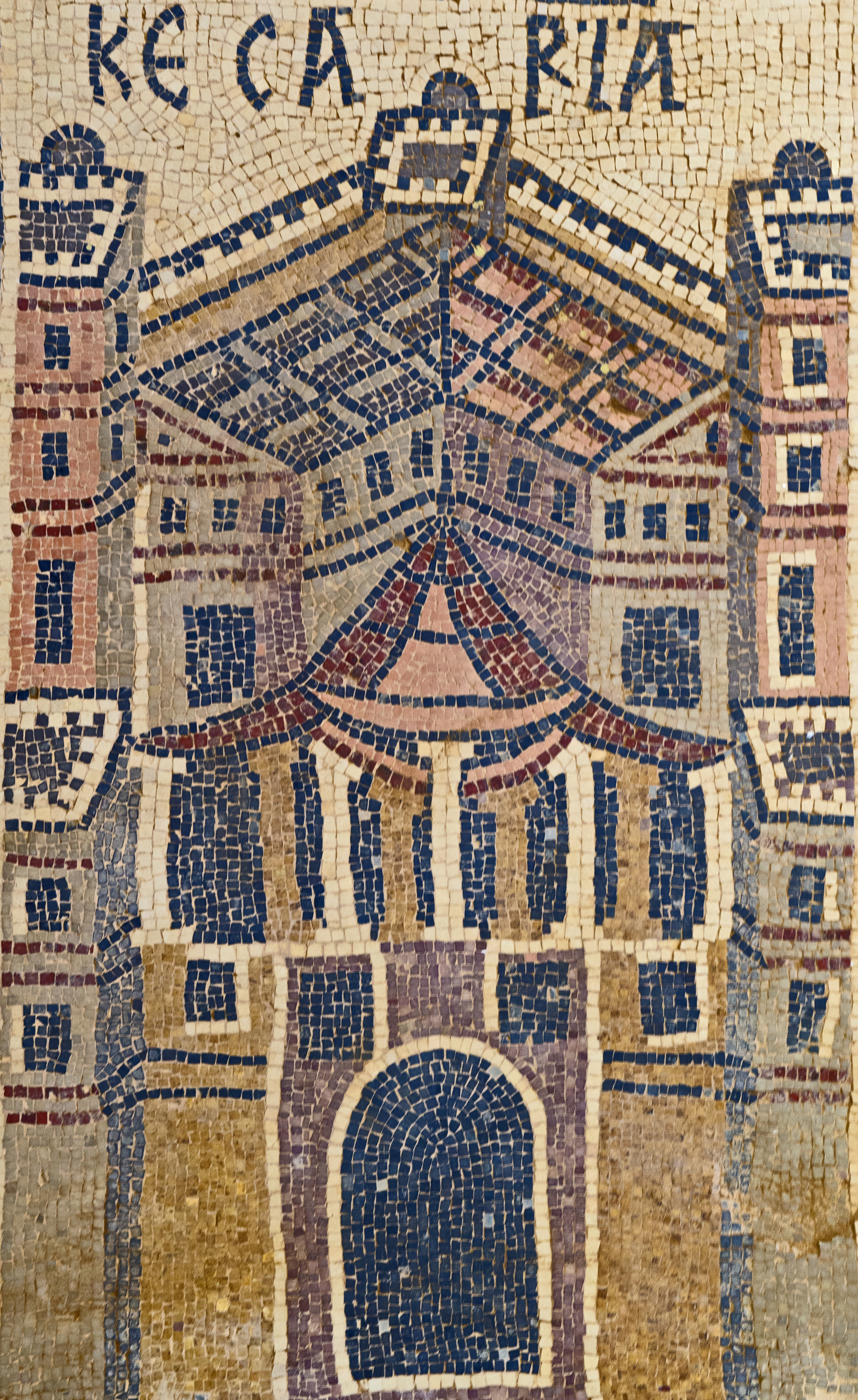
Caesarea

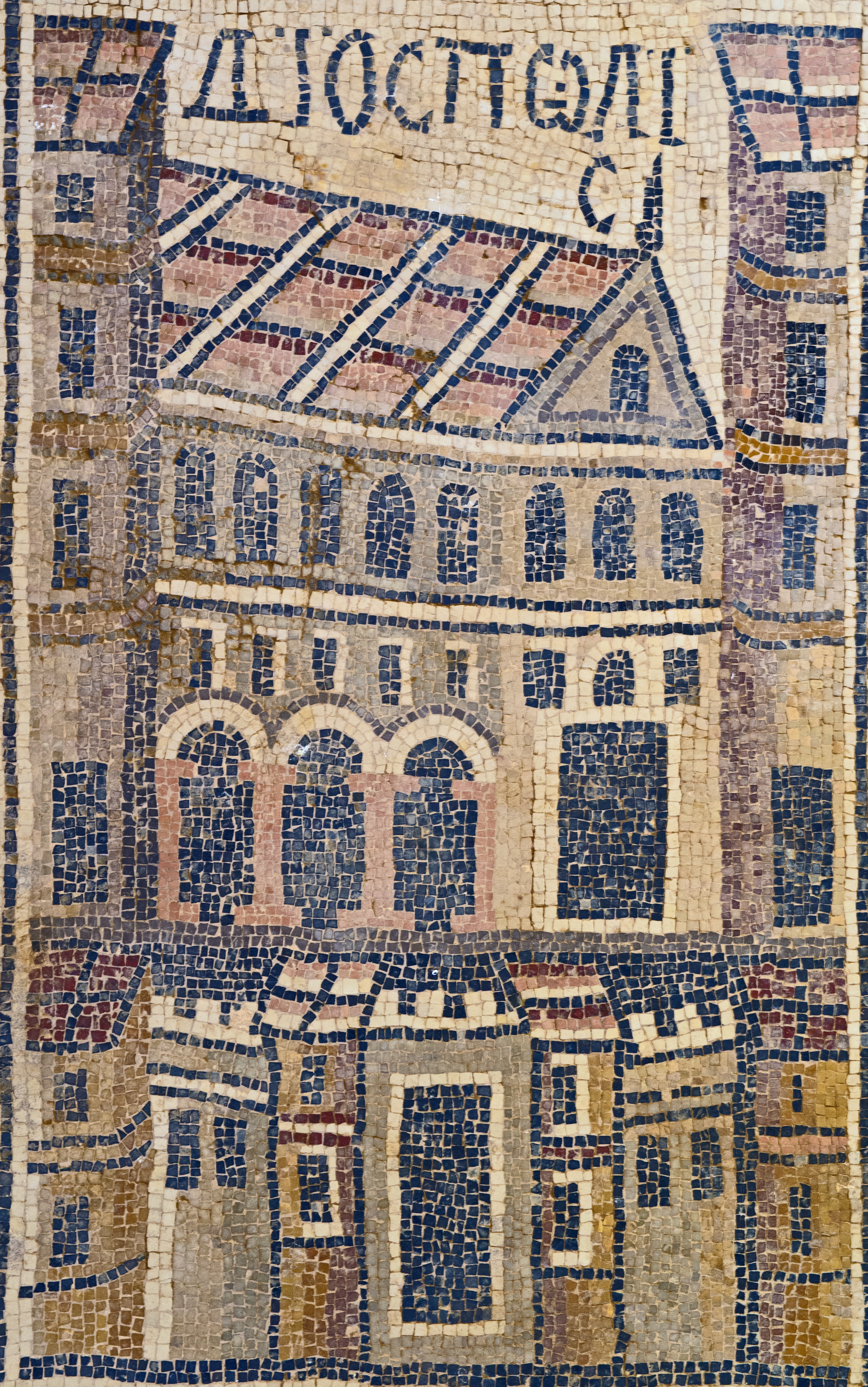
Lydda

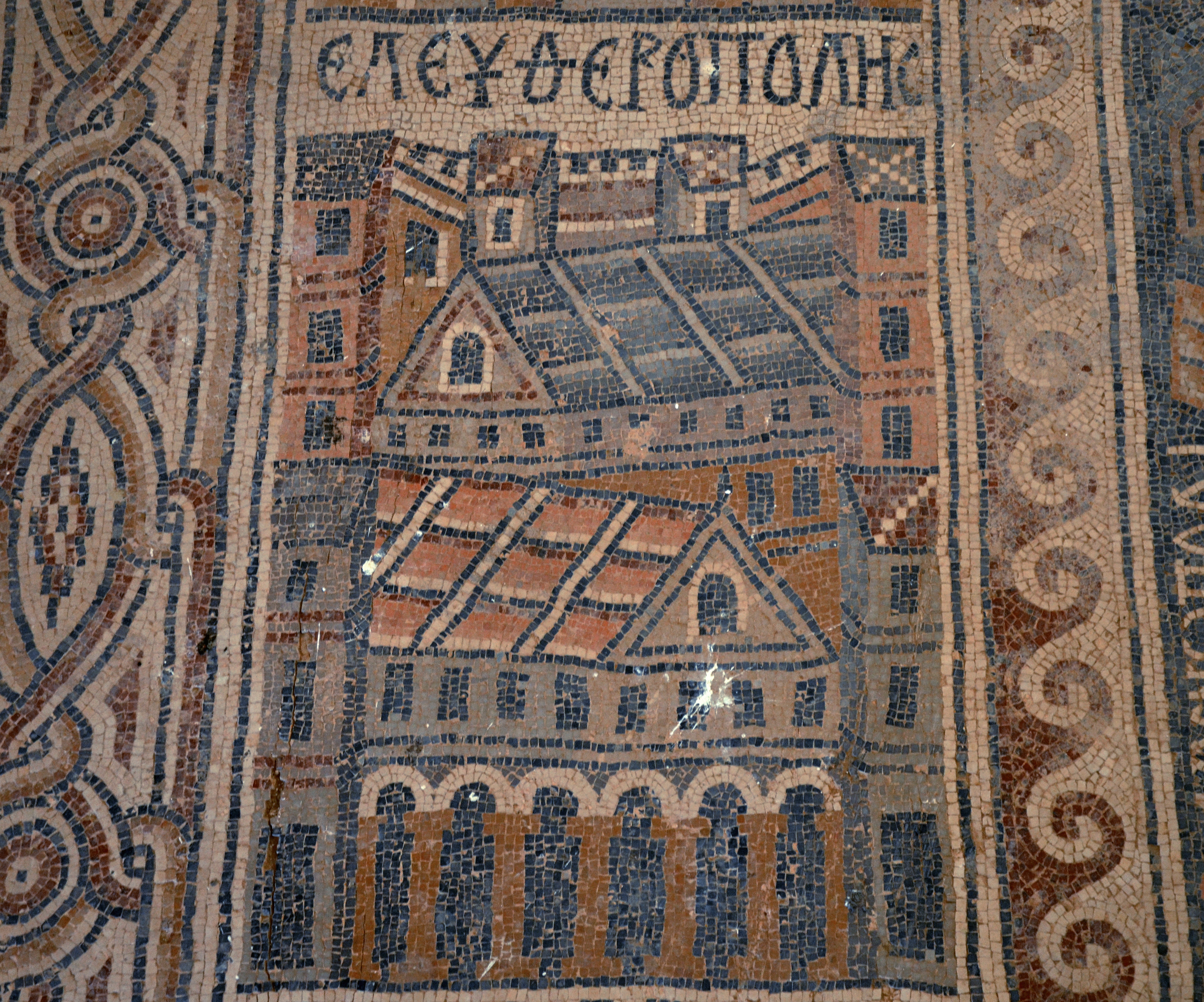
Eleutheropolis (Bayt Jibrin)

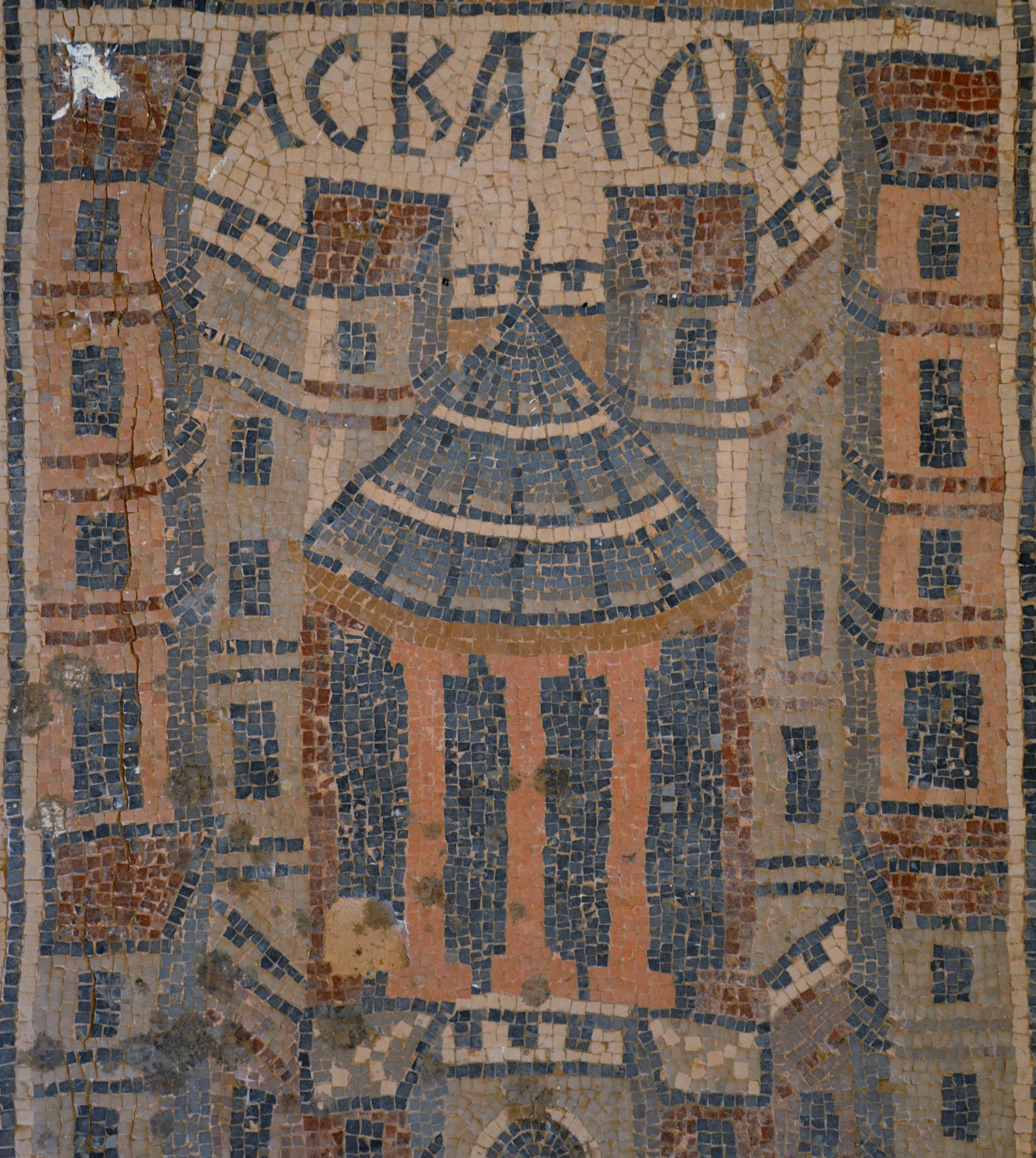
Ashkelon

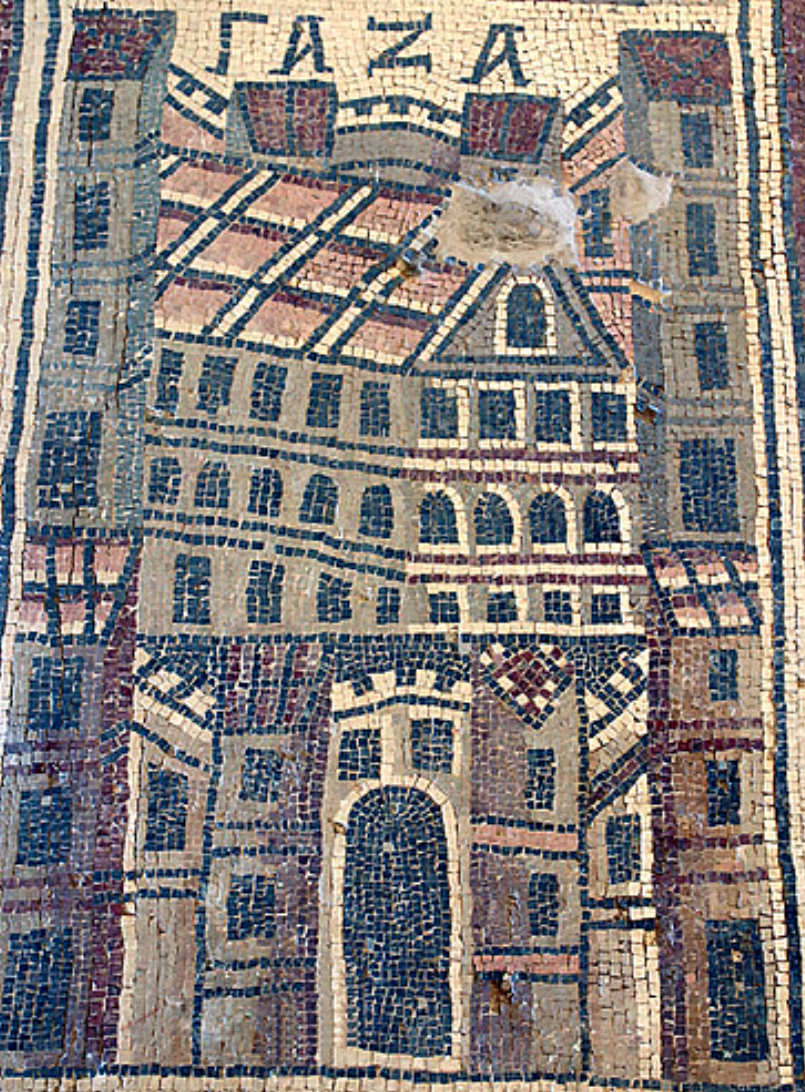
Gaza

=== Outer frame, right (southern) side ===
Seven cities in Transjordan are shown in the frame:

- Kastron Mefaa (Umm er-Rasas)
- Philadelphia (Amman)
- Madaba
- Esbounta (Heshbon)
- Belemounta (Ma'in)
- Areopolis (Rabba)
- Charachmoba (Al-Karak)

Two additional cities are shown at the head of each aisle:

- Limbon
- Diblaton
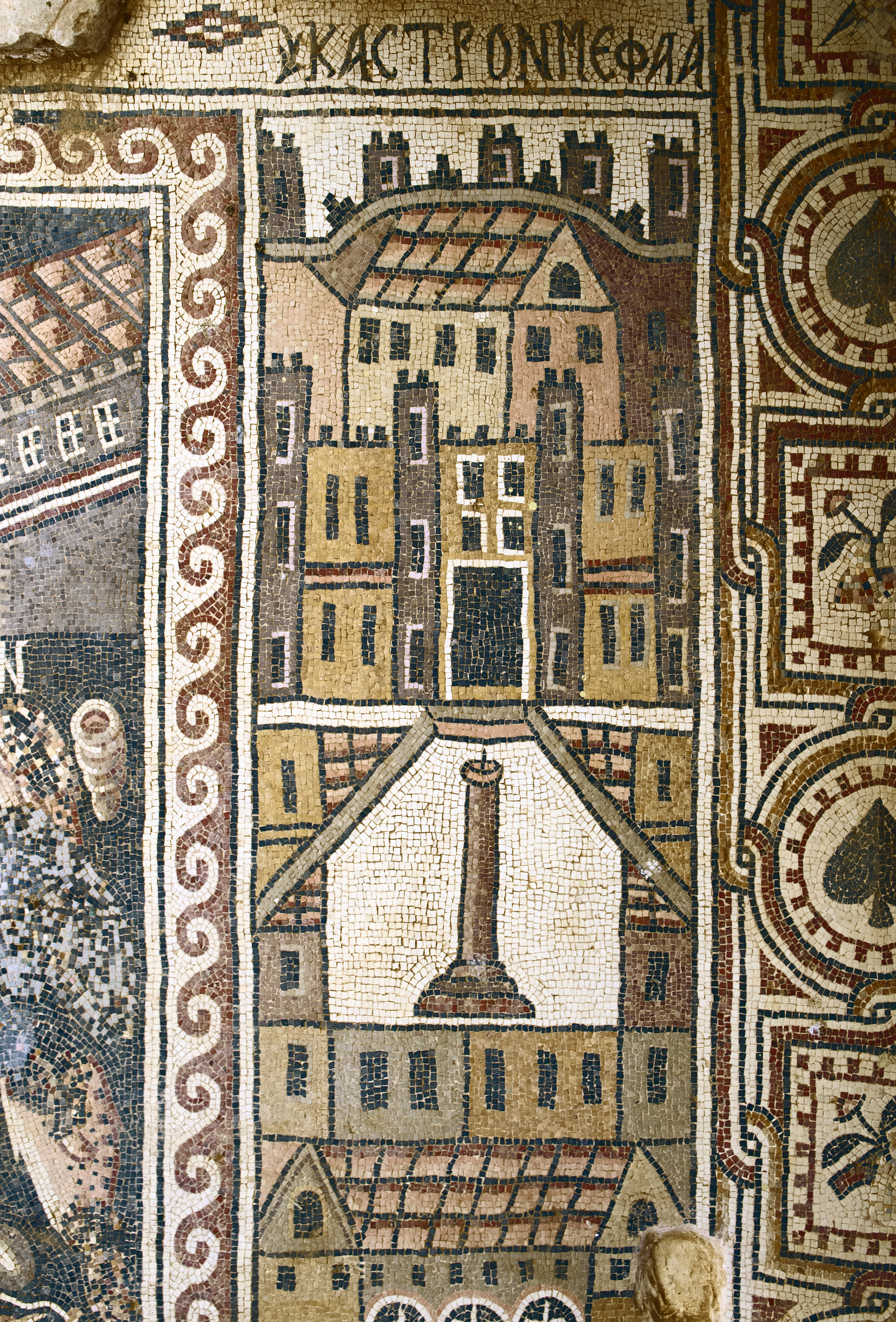
Kastron Mefaa (Umm er-Rasas)

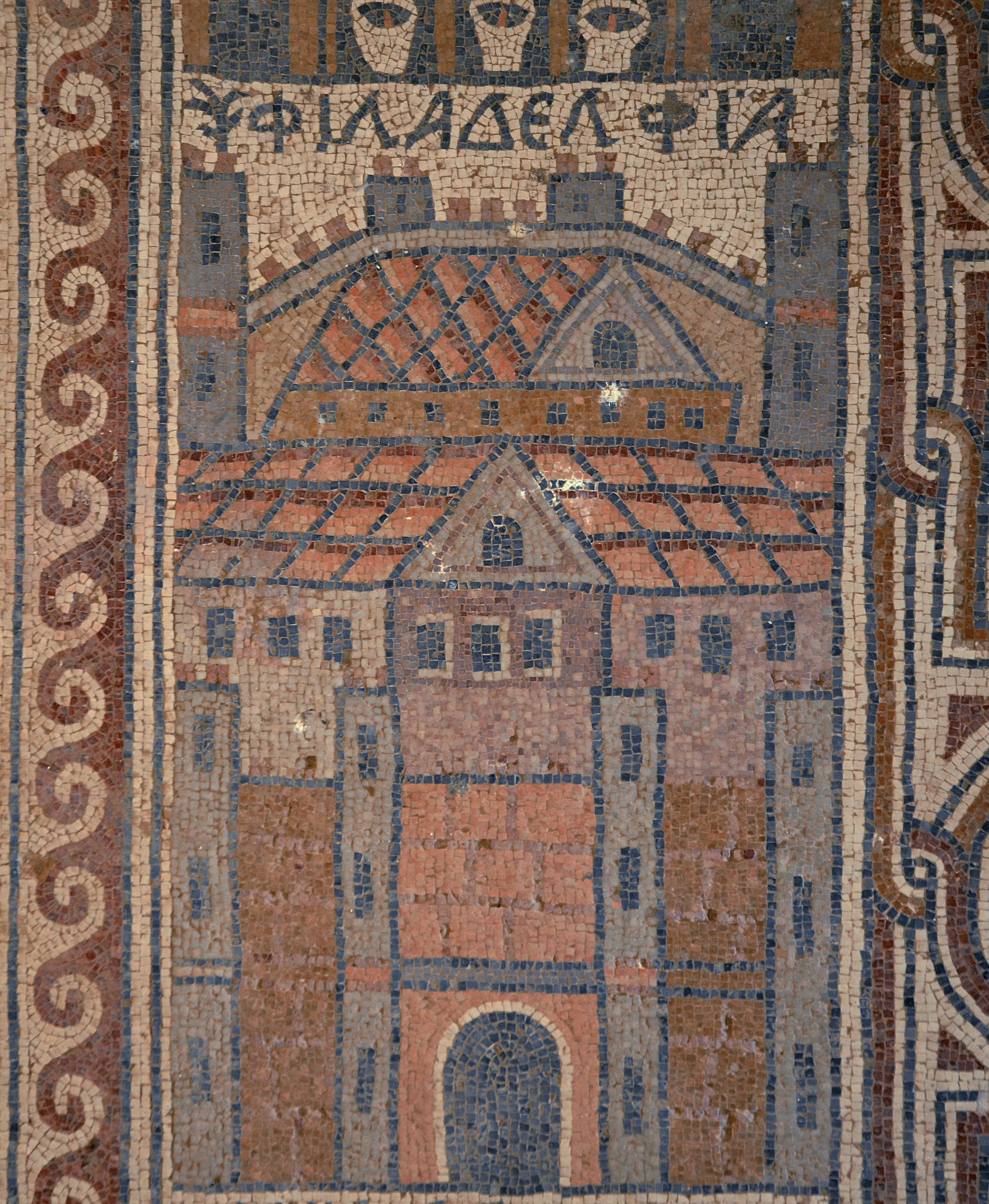
Philadelphia (Amman)

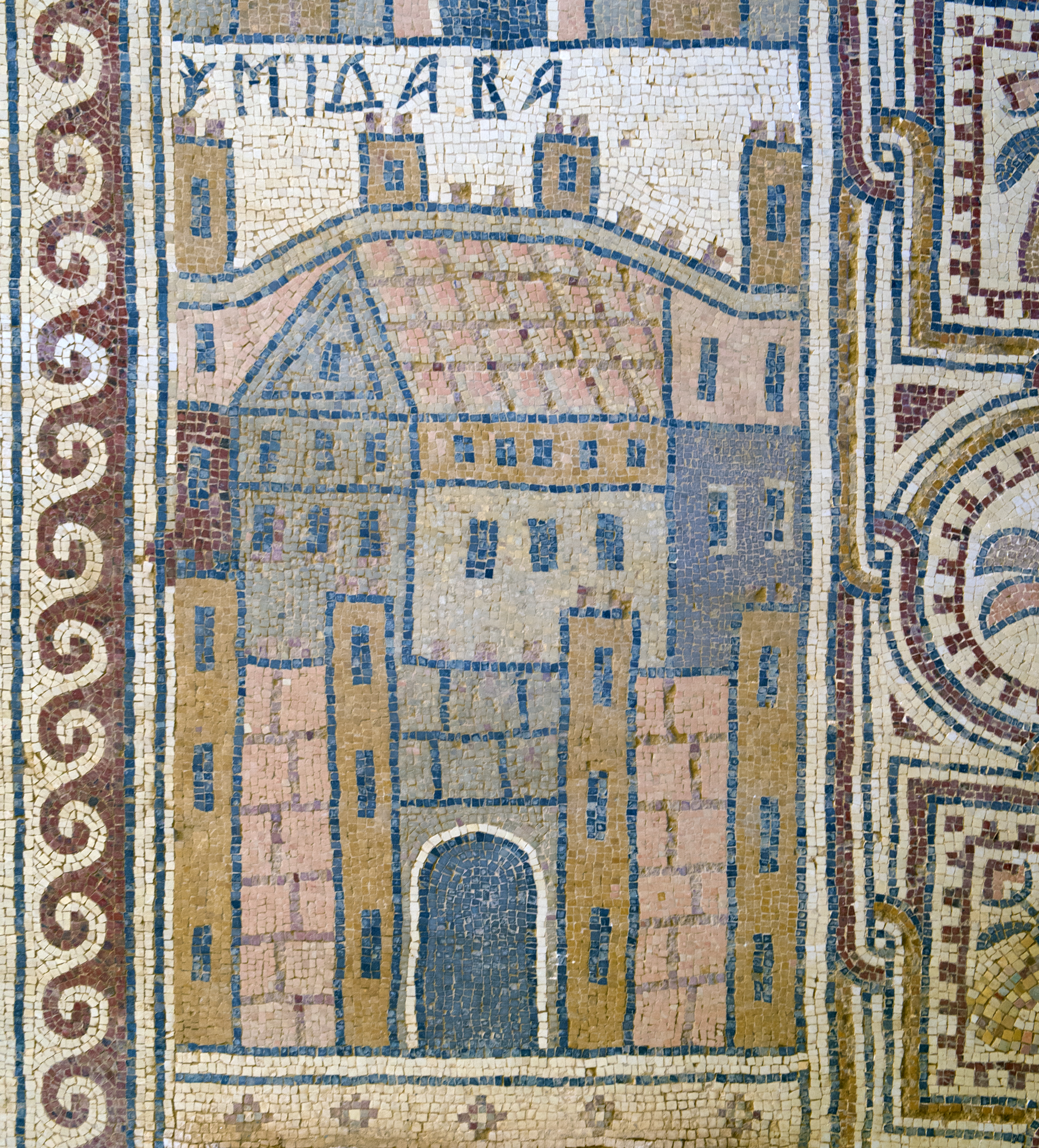
Madaba

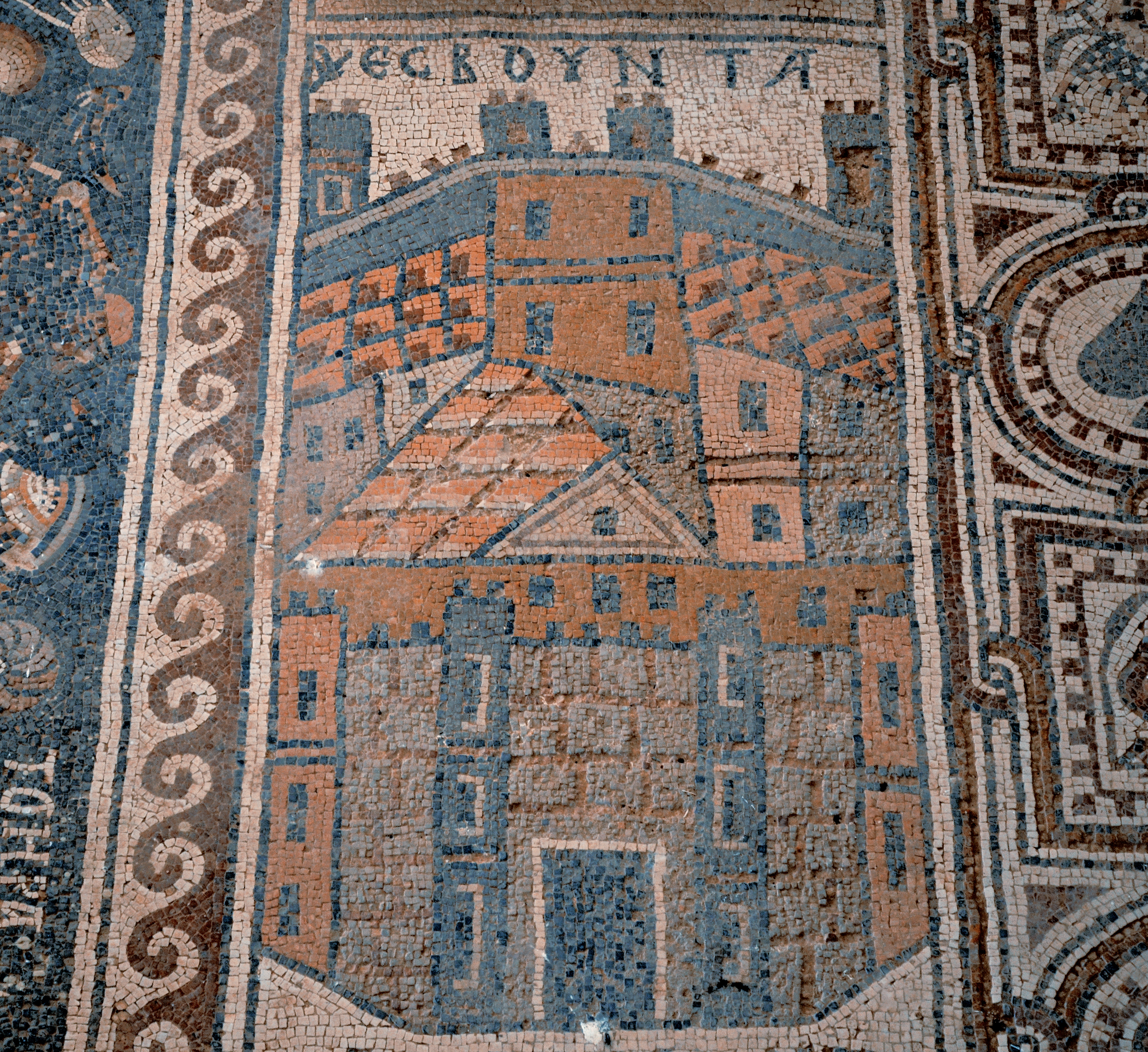
Esbounta (Heshbon)

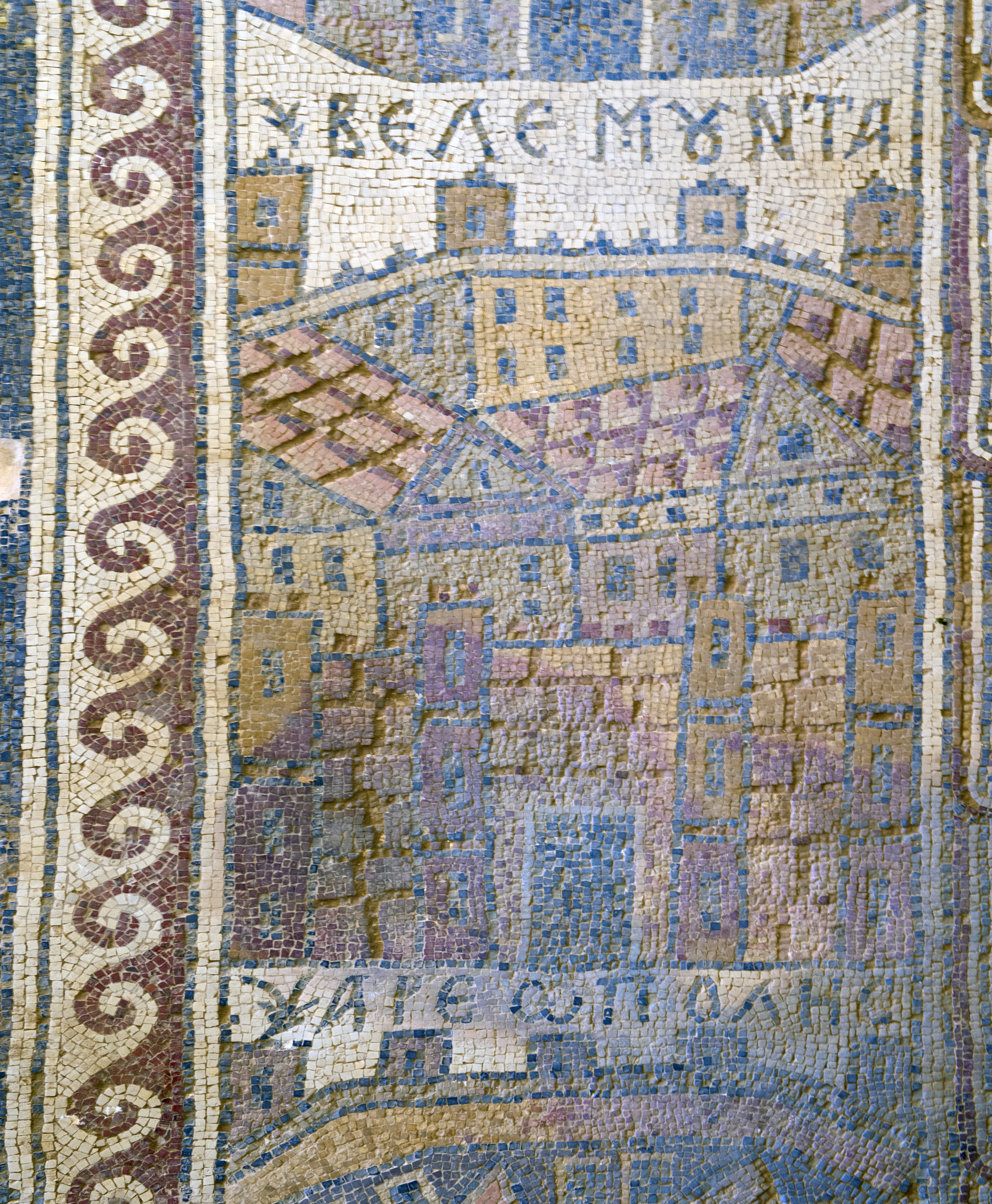
Belemounta (Ma'in)

=== Inner frame ===
The inner frame includes illustrations of ten cities in the Nile Delta:

- Alexandria
- Kasin (Ras Kouroun)
- Thenesos
- Tamiathis
- Panau
- Pelusium
- Anticiaou(?)
- Eraklion (either Heracleopolis Parva / Sethroë or Heracleion)
- Cynopolis
- Pseudostomon.
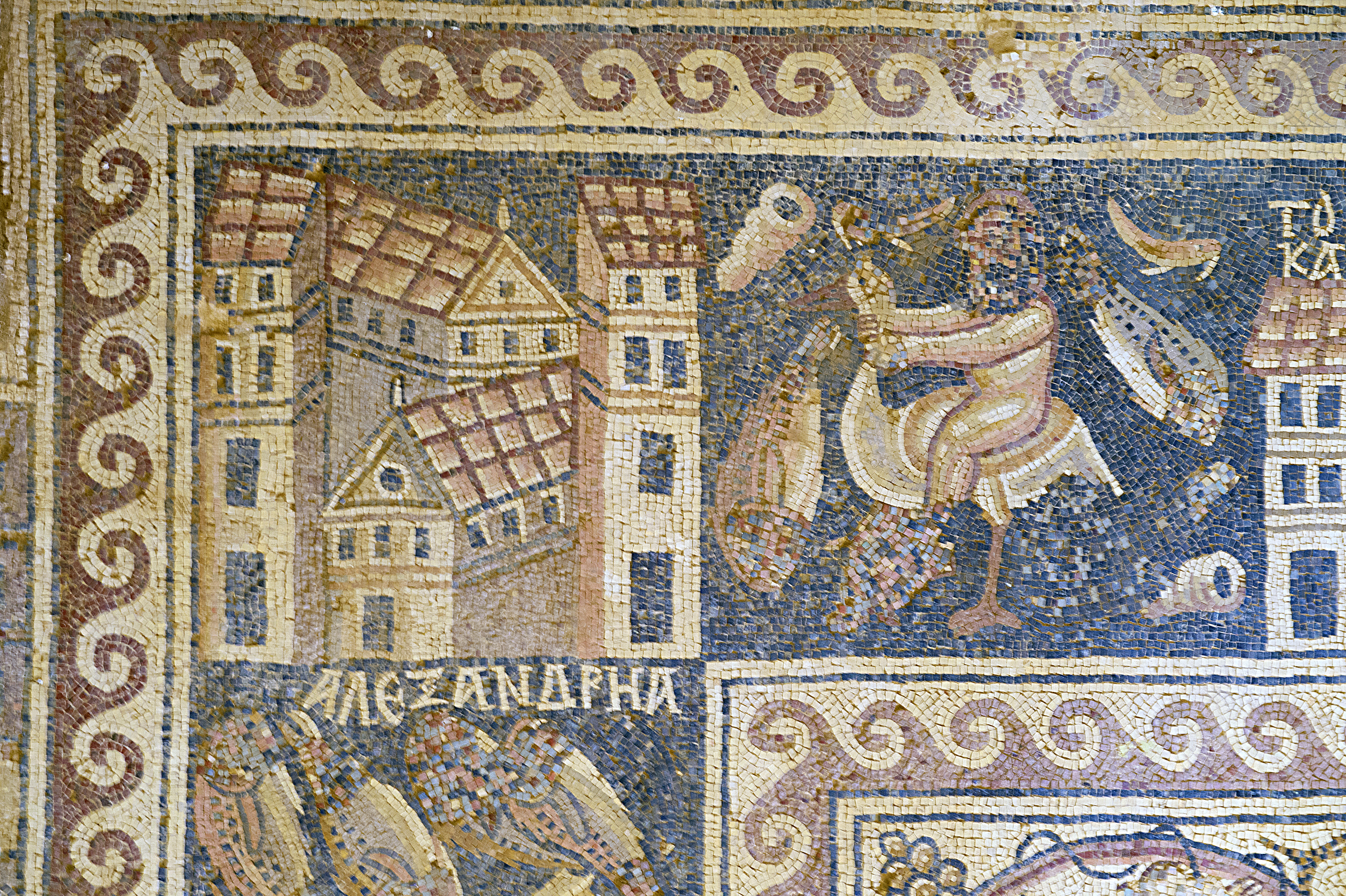
Alexandria

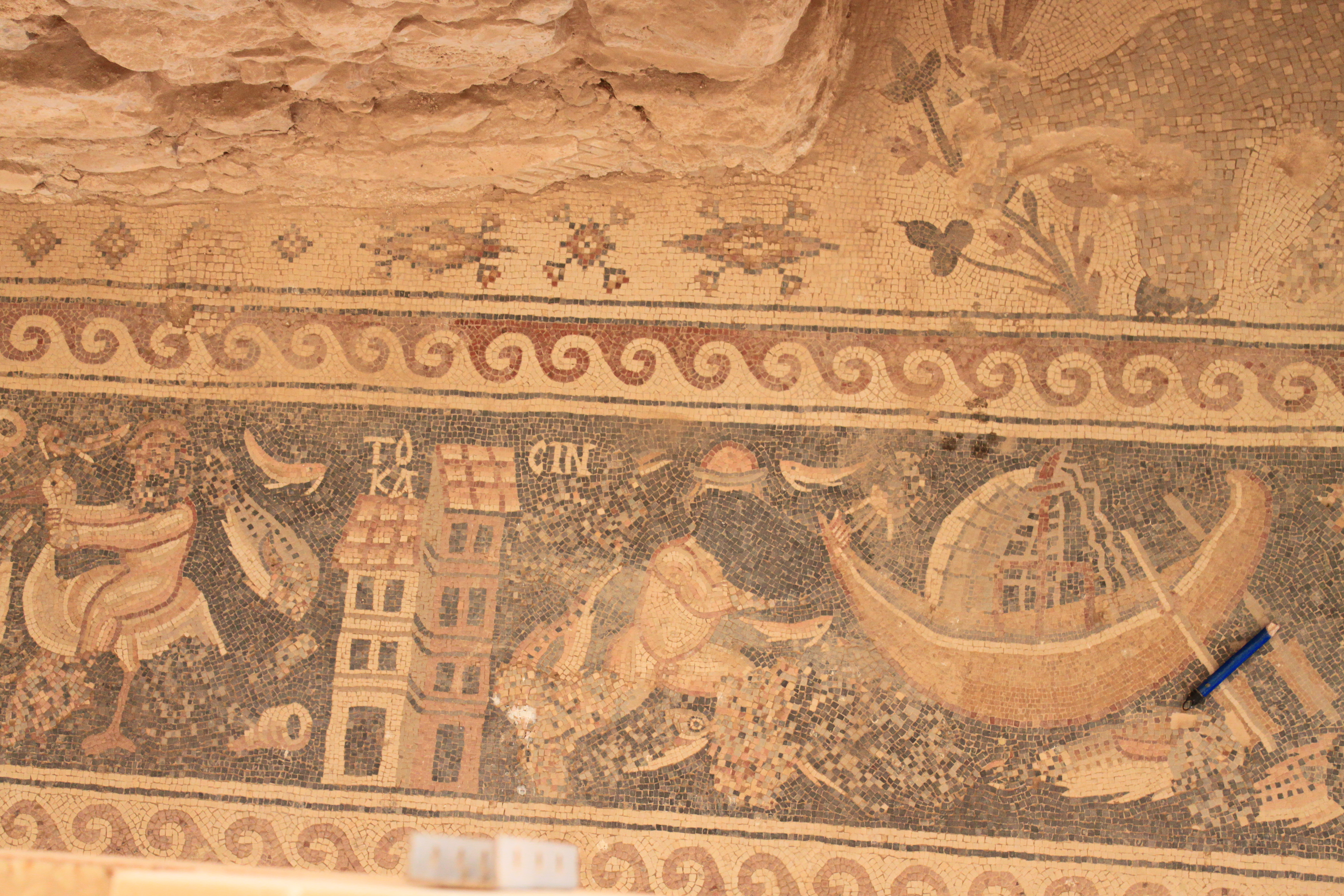
Kasin (Ras Kouroun)

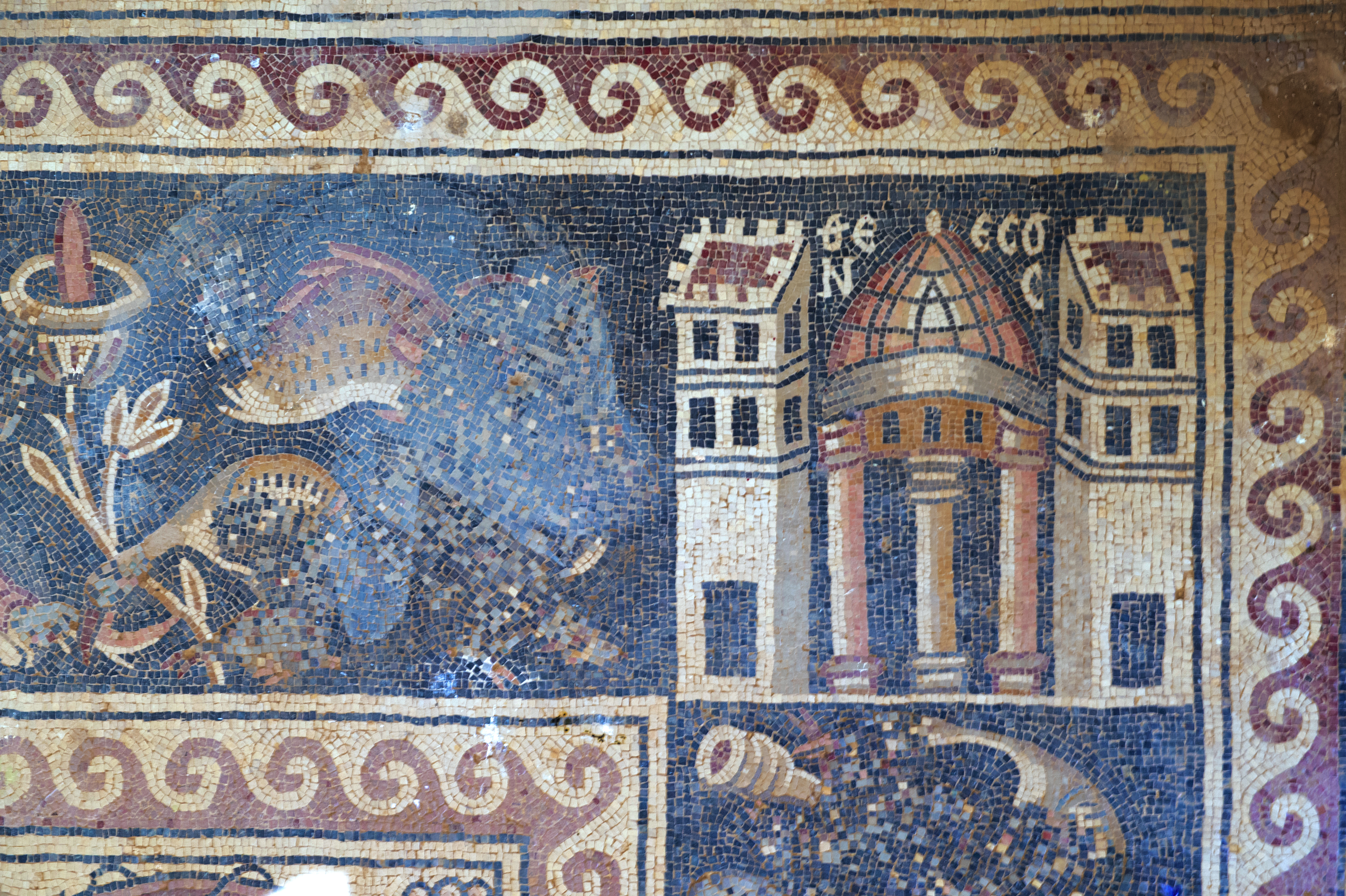
Thenesos

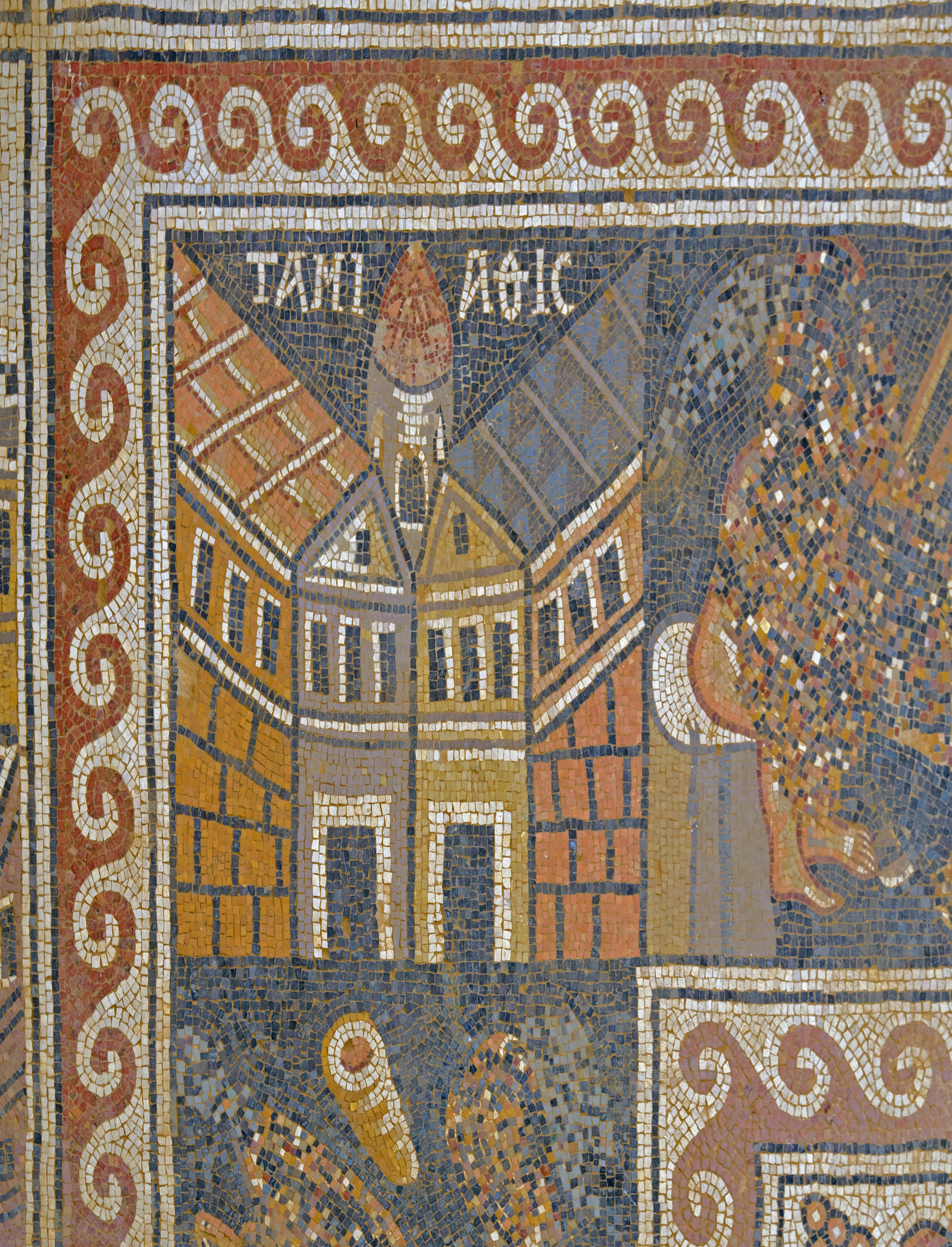
Tamiathis

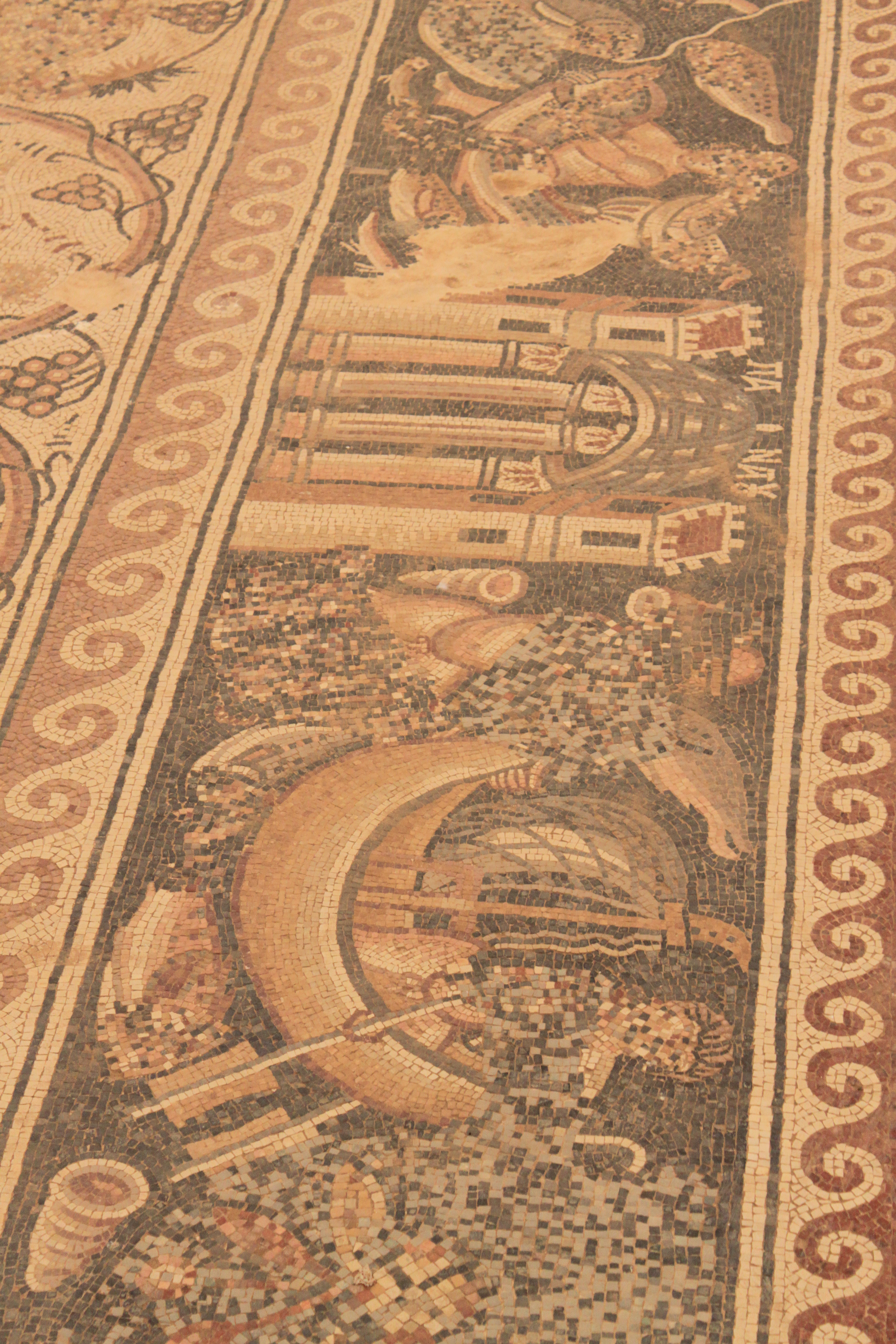
Panau

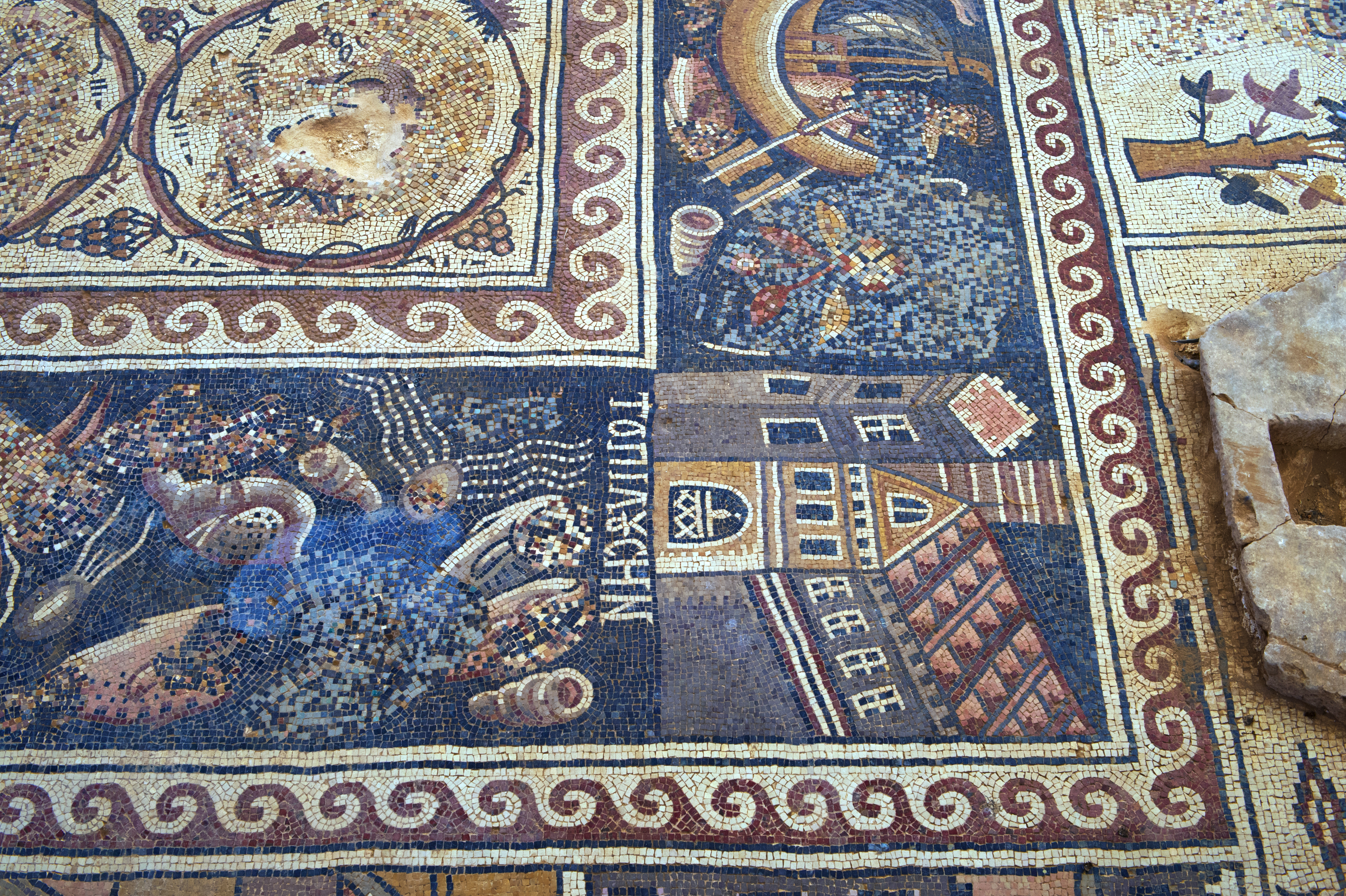
Pelusium

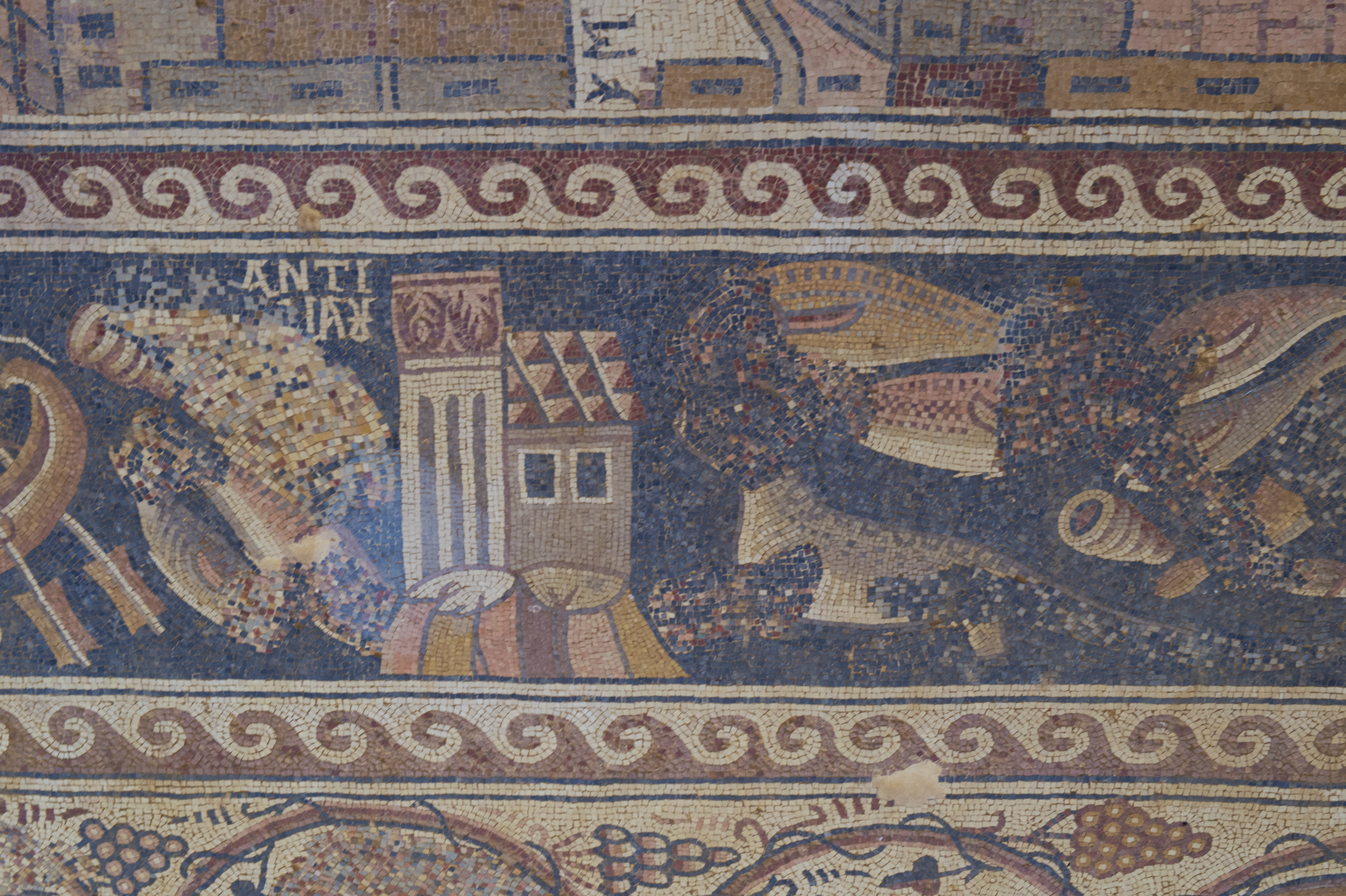
Anticiaou(?)

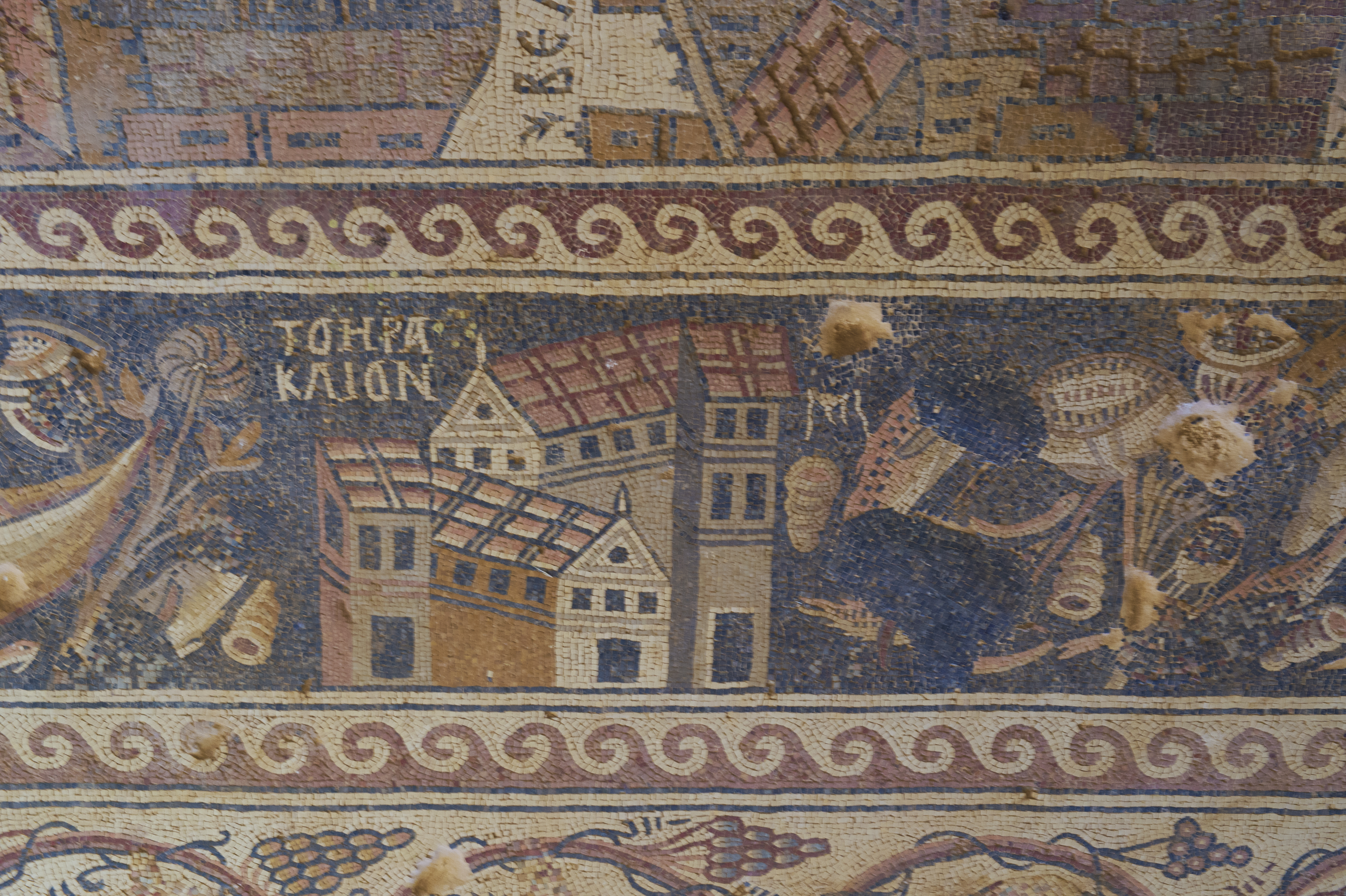
Eraklion

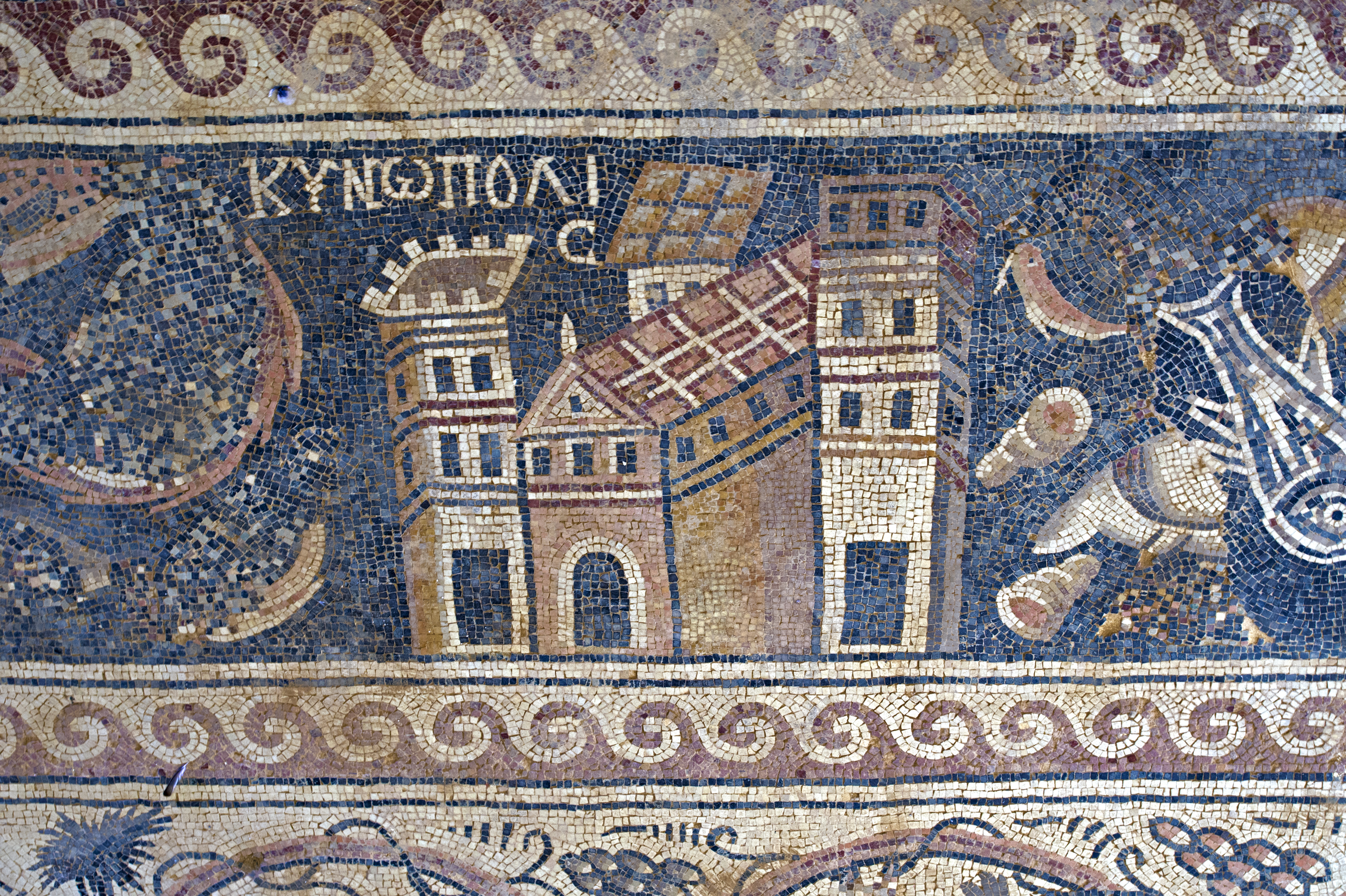
Cynopolis

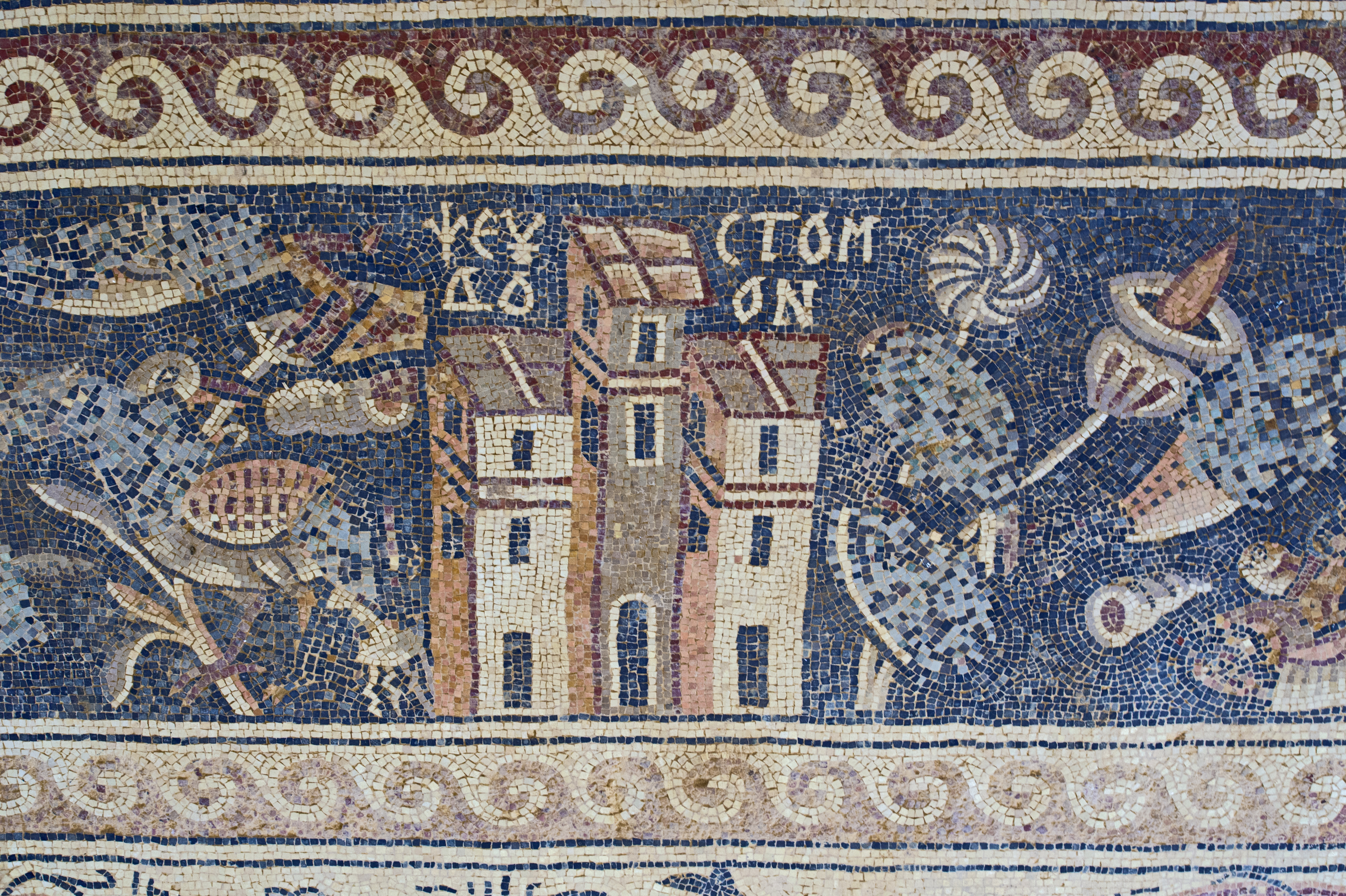
Pseudostomon

== See also ==
- Early Byzantine mosaics in the Middle East; although dating to the Abbasid period, the mosaics there are part of the Byzantine tradition

== Bibliography ==
- Piccirillo, Michele; Attiyat, Taysir (1986). "The Complex of Saint Stephen at Umm er-Rasas-Kastron Mefaa. First Campaign, August 1986". Annual of the Department of Antiquities of Jordan. 30. Department of Antiquities, Hashemite Kingdom of Jordan.: 341–352.
- Piccirillo, Michele (1988). "The Mosaics at Um er-Rasas in Jordan". The Biblical Archaeologist. 51 (4). The American Schools of Oriental Research: 208–231. doi:10.2307/3210072. ISSN 0006-0895. JSTOR 3210072. S2CID 192366752.
- Balty, Janine (1998). "Les mosaïques d'Umm al-Rasas et la date de 718 - MICHELE PICCIRILLO, EUGENIO ALLIATA, et al., UMM AL-RASAS, MAYFA'AH I: GLI SCAVI DEL COMPLESSO DI SANTO STEFANO (Studium Biblicum Franciscanum, Collectio Maior 28; Jerusalem, 1994). Pp. 376, figg. 319, 35 pl. coul., 62 figg. coul., 3 plans dépliants". Journal of Roman Archaeology. 11. Cambridge University Press (CUP): 700–702. doi:10.1017/s104775940001789x. ISSN 1047-7594. S2CID 250349440.
- Eckersley, Tracey (2016). Putting Christians on the map : topographic mosaics from late antique Jordan as representations of authority and status (Thesis). University of Louisville. doi:10.18297/etd/2484.
