= St. Bartholomew the Apostle Church, Kafr Kanna =

Coordinates: 32.7475°N 35.3383°E

St. Bartholomew the Apostle Church
- כנסיית בית ברתולומאוס השליח
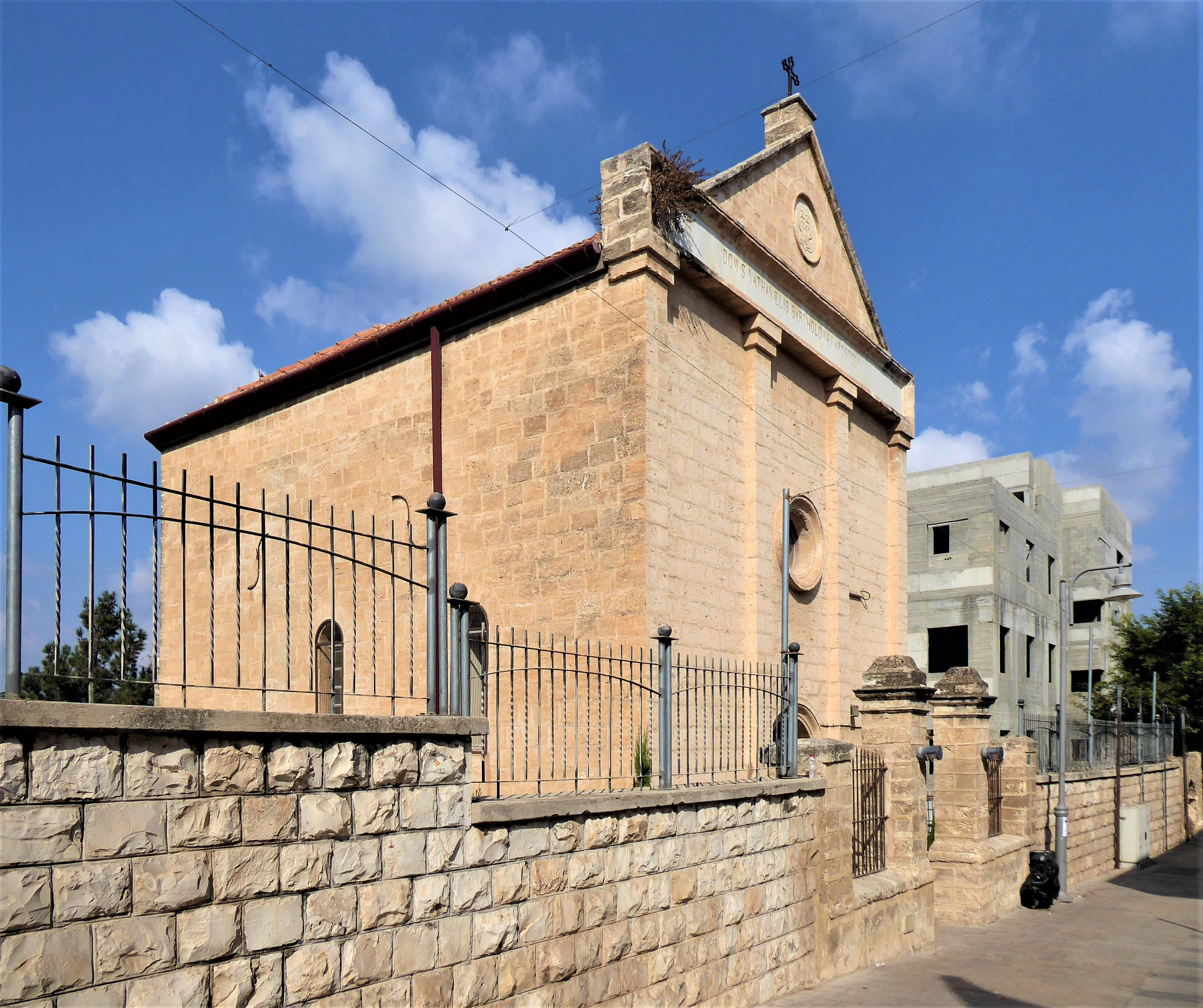
- St. Bartholomew the Apostle Church
- Location: Kafr Kanna
- Country: Israel
- Denomination: Roman Catholic Church

The St. Bartholomew the Apostle Church (Hebrew: כנסיית בית ברתולומאוס השליח Latin: Ecclesia Sancti Bartholomei Apostoli) is the name given to a Catholic church administered by the Franciscan order in Kafr Kanna in Israel, built in honor of Cana, the place where Scripture says was the hometown of the apostle St. Bartholomew. The church was founded in 1885. Bartholomew is one of the apostles who according to the Bible were present at the miracle of the fish: "Later, by the Sea of Tiberias, Jesus again revealed Himself to the disciples. He made Himself known in this way: Simon Peter, Thomas called Didymus, Nathanael from Cana in Galilee, the sons of Zebedee, and two other disciples were together" (John 21: 1–2)

The front of the church features four pillars and a round window above the main doorway. In the center is a Latin inscription: "DOM S NATHANAELIS BARTHOLOMAEI APOSTOLI" (which means The apostle Nathanael Bartholomew). The altar stands on a raised platform, and in front, two pairs of small-sized columns have Corinthian capitals, and a bas-relief depicting the meeting of Nathanael and Philip the Apostle. Nearby is a small cemetery.

== See also ==
- Roman Catholicism in Israel
- Latin Patriarchate of Jerusalem

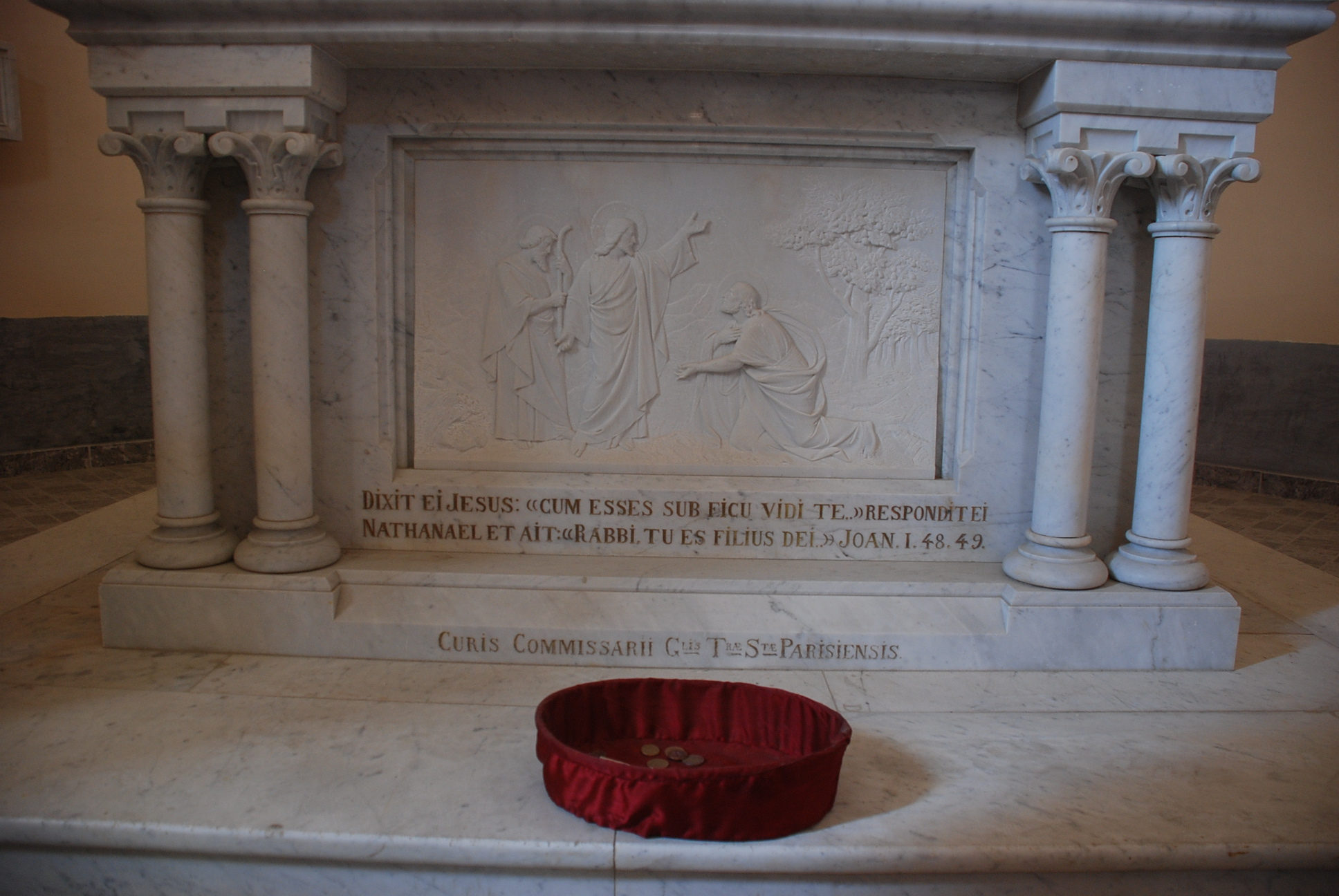
Internal View
