= Brodie Deshaies =

American politician

Member of the New Hampshire House of Representatives from the Carroll 6th district
- In office December 2, 2020 – December 7, 2022
- Preceded by: Edith DesMarais
- Succeeded by: Katy Peternel

Personal details
- Born: January 1, 1999 (age 27) Newton, New Hampshire, U.S.
- Party: Republican
- Education: St. Anselm College
- Profession: Legislative Advocate
- Website: https://www.brodiefornh.com

Brodie Deshaies (born January 1, 1999) is an American politician in the state of New Hampshire. He is a former member of the New Hampshire House of Representatives, serving as a Republican from Carroll County District 6 from 2020 to 2022, and a former member of the Wolfeboro Public Library's Board of Trustees from 2022 to 2024. He is currently a school board member at-large for the Governor Wentworth Regional School District.

== Career ==
Deshaies was a full-time political contractor, working for candidates throughout NH. Deshaies also served as the Wolfeboro delegate to the Republican State Convention, Vice-Chairman of the Winnipesaukee Republicans, and Executive Director of the Saint Anselm College Republicans.

On September 13, 2022, Deshaies lost his seat in the Republican primary, after he was targeted by anti-abortion groups for co-authoring and co-sponsoring a bill that created an exception to New Hampshire's 24-week abortion ban for fatal fetal anomalies.
