= Louis Deshayes =

French diplomat

Louis Deshayes, Baron de Courmemin (1600 – 12 October 1632), was a French diplomat.

== Biography ==
Advisor to Louis XIII, he was sent on several missions to the Levant, Denmark, Safavid Iran and the Tsardom of Russia.

Having joined a conspiracy against Cardinal Richelieu, he was arrested under the orders of his rival Hercules de Charnacé, at Mainz and beheaded at Béziers in 1632.

== Works ==
- Voyage du Levant, fait par le commandement du roi en 1621, Paris, 1624
- Voyages au Danemark, 1664.

== Bibliography ==
- Pierre Margry, Une ambassade des Français en Russie sous Louis XIII (1629), dans Revue maritime et coloniale, juillet 1861, p. 213-241 (lire en ligne -, erratum)
