= Daniel Veilleux =

American politician

Member of the New Hampshire House of Representatives from the Hillsborough 22nd district
- In office 2020 – December 7, 2022

Member of the New Hampshire House of Representatives from the Hillsborough 34th district
- Incumbent
- Assumed office December 7, 2022

Personal details
- Party: Democratic
- Education: University of Maine (BA) (MA)

Daniel Veilleux is an American politician. He serves as a Democratic member for the Hillsborough 34th district of the New Hampshire House of Representatives.

== Personal life ==
Veilleux resides in Amherst, New Hampshire. He received a Bachelor of Arts degree in political science from the University of Maine as well as a master's degree in public administration.

== Political career ==
Veilleux was first elected to the New Hampshire House of Representatives on November 4, 2020. Veilleux serves on the Transportation Committee. He serves on the Souhegan Cooperative School Board. He was re-elected in 2022 and 2024.

== Election results ==
2018 Hillsborough District 22 New Hampshire House of Representatives Democratic primary
Party	Candidate	Votes	%
Democratic	Megan Murray	1,030	36.6
Democratic	Julie Radhakrishnan	932	33.1
Democratic	Daniel Veilleux	851	30.3
Total votes		2,813	100.0

Hillsborough District 22 General Election, 2018
Party	Candidate	Votes	%
Democratic	Megan Murray	3,243	18.8
Democratic	Julie Radhakrishnan	2,999	17.4
Republican	Reed Panasiti (Incumbent)	2,872	16.7
Democratic	Daniel Veilleux	2,859	16.6
Republican	Peter Hansen (incumbent)	2,726	15.8
Republican	Scott Courtemanche	2,521	14.6
Total votes		17,220	100.0
Democratic hold			
Democratic gain from Republican			
Republican hold			

2020 Hillsborough 22nd New Hampshire House of Representatives Democratic primary
Party	Candidate	Votes	%
Democratic	Megan Murray (incumbent)	1,268	34.1
Democratic	Daniel Veilleux	919	24.7
Democratic	Tony Labranche	805	21.6
Democratic	Theresa Cheslock	723	19.4
Total votes		3,722	100.0

2020 Hillsborough 22nd New Hampshire House of Representatives General Election
Party	Candidate	Votes	%
Democratic	Megan Murray (incumbent)	4,012	18.6
Democratic	Daniel Veilleux	3,658	16.9
Democratic	Tony Labranche	3,641	16.8
Republican	Peter Hansen	3,567	16.5
Republican	Danielle Pray	3,395	15.7
Republican	Pamela Coughlin	3,339	15.4
Total votes		21,618	100.0
