= Megan Murray (politician) =

New Hampshire politician

Member of the New Hampshire House of Representatives from the Hillsborough 37th district
- In office December 7, 2022 – Present
- Preceded by: Peter Hansen

Member of the New Hampshire House of Representatives from the Hillsborough 22nd district
- In office December 2017 – December 7, 2022

Personal details
- Party: Democratic

Megan A. Murray is an American politician from the New Hampshire Democratic Party. She has been a Democratic member of the New Hampshire House of Representatives for Amherst, New Hampshire since the 2018.

== Personal life ==
Murray is married and has three children. Murray is a former school teacher. Murray resides in Amherst, New Hampshire.

== Political career ==
Murray was first elected to the New Hampshire House of Representatives in 2018 for Hillsborough District 22, which represents Amherst, and served for that district until 2022. She currently serves for the Hillsborough 37th district, which encompasses Amherst and Milford. She serves as on the Environment and Agriculture Committee and has served as the Deputy Ranking Member since 2022. She currently serves as Vice Chair of the Hillsborough County Delegation.

== Election results ==
2018 Hillsborough District 22 New Hampshire House of Representatives Democratic primary
Party	Candidate	Votes	%
Democratic	Megan Murray	1,030	36.6
Democratic	Julie Radhakrishnan	932	33.1
Democratic	Daniel Veilleux	851	30.3
Total votes		2,813	100.0

Hillsborough District 22 General Election, 2018
Party	Candidate	Votes	%
Democratic	Megan Murray	3,243	18.8
Democratic	Julie Radhakrishnan	2,999	17.4
Republican	Reed Panasiti (Incumbent)	2,872	16.7
Democratic	Daniel Veilleux	2,859	16.6
Republican	Peter Hansen (incumbent)	2,726	15.8
Republican	Scott Courtemanche	2,521	14.6
Total votes		17,220	100.0
Democratic hold			
Democratic gain from Republican			
Republican hold			

2020 Hillsborough 22nd New Hampshire House of Representatives Democratic primary
Party	Candidate	Votes	%
Democratic	Megan Murray (incumbent)	1,268	34.1
Democratic	Daniel Veilleux	919	24.7
Democratic	Tony Labranche	805	21.6
Democratic	Theresa Cheslock	723	19.4
Total votes		3,722	100.0

2020 Hillsborough 22nd New Hampshire House of Representatives General Election
Party	Candidate	Votes	%
Democratic	Megan Murray (incumbent)	4,012	18.6
Democratic	Daniel Veilleux	3,658	16.9
Democratic	Tony Labranche	3,641	16.8
Republican	Peter Hansen	3,567	16.5
Republican	Danielle Pray	3,395	15.7
Republican	Pamela Coughlin	3,339	15.4
Total votes		21,618	100.0

2022 Hillsborough District 37 New Hampshire House of Representatives Democratic primary
Party	Candidate	Votes	%
Democratic	Megan Murray (incumbent)	1,710	99.9
Write-in	Write-ins	2	0.1
Total votes		1,712	100.0

Hillsborough District 37 General Election, 2022
Party	Candidate	Votes	%
Democratic	Megan Murray	7,162	53.8
Republican	Michael Facques	6,132	46.1
Write-in	Write-ins	9	0.1
Total votes		17,220	100.0

2024 Hillsborough District 37 New Hampshire House of Representatives Democratic primary
Party	Candidate	Votes	%
Democratic	Megan Murray (incumbent)	2,524	99.8
Write-in	Write-ins	6	0.2
Total votes		2,530	100.0

Hillsborough District 37 General Election, 2024
Party	Candidate	Votes	%
Democratic	Megan Murray	8,424	50.4
Republican	Pamela Coughlin	8,290	49.6
Write-in	Write-ins	13	0.1
Total votes		17,220	100.0
