= Tony Labranche =

American politician (born 2001)

Member of the New Hampshire House of Representatives from the Hillsborough 22nd district
- In office December 3, 2020 – August 8, 2022
- Preceded by: Reed Panasiti
- Succeeded by: Jennifer Morton

Personal details
- Born: November 11, 2001 (age 24) Nashua, New Hampshire, U.S.
- Party: Democratic (until 2022, 2024–present)
- Other party: Bloc Quebecois: Independent (2022–2024)
- Education: Souhegan High School
- Alma mater: Georgetown University (BA)
- Website: Campaign website

Tony Labranche (born November 11, 2001) is a New Hampshire politician. He was the youngest member of the New Hampshire House of Representatives and the youngest openly LGBTQ+ legislator in United States history.

== Early life ==
Tony Labranche was born in Nashua, New Hampshire on November 11, 2001, to parents Patrick Labranche and Sandra Martin. Both of whom are originally from Thetford Mines, Québec where the majority of his family still lives today. Labranche was diagnosed with stage three colon cancer at age ten. In 2014, Labranche moved to Amherst, New Hampshire.

== Education ==
Labranche graduated from Souhegan High School in early 2020. Labranche attended Nashua Community College and majored in political science. Labranche later transferred to Georgetown University where he graduated with a Bachelor of Arts in Sociology.

== Political career ==
In April 2020 Labranche was selected to serve as an alternate delegate for Bernie Sanders at the 2020 Democratic National Convention. This position gave him a seat on the New Hampshire Democratic Party State Committee.

While finishing his senior year of high school Labranche ran unsuccessfully for the Souhegan Cooperative School Board. Labranche then pursued a seat in the New Hampshire House of Representatives as a member of the Democratic Party. Labranche won that bid, and took office on December 3, 2020. Labranche served on the State-Federal Relations & Veterans Affairs Committee.

In 2021 Labranche ran for Rules Committee of the New Hampshire Democratic Party. In the same year Labranche ran again for a seat on the Souhegan Cooperative School Board unsuccessfully.

In 2022 Labranche announced that he would leave the Democratic Party and caucus as an Independent. He cited issues with New Hampshire Democratic Party Chair Raymond Buckley, Joe Biden's COVID-19 response, and the two-party system as reasons for his departure. He caucused with fellow independent Ellen Read throughout the remainder of the term.

On August 8, 2022, Labranche resigned from the New Hampshire House of Representatives.

Labranche unsuccessfully ran for Speaker of the New Hampshire House of Representatives in 2022.

On May 20, 2023, Labranche was elected to the Commission de la citoyenneté du Bloc Québécois at the Bloc Québécois party congress.

On January 6, 2024, Labranche was selected as a New Hampshire's 2nd congressional district primary delegate for the Marianne Williamson 2024 presidential campaign. Williamson did not meet the threshold to receive any delegates in New Hampshire.

In 2022, Labranche ran for Hillsborough County Register of Probate as a member of the Democratic Party and lost.

In February 2025, Labranche announced he was running for First Vice Chair of the New Hampshire Democratic Party.

== Political Positions ==
Labranche was considered a progressive representative.

=== Constitutional Reform ===
In 2022, Labranche proposed eight constitutional amendments to the New Hampshire Constitution. One such constitutional amendment was to make the New Hampshire Constitution gender-neutral. Additionally, Labranched proposed a constitutional amendment to lower the age requirement to serve in the New Hampshire Senate from 30 to 25. Additionally, Labranche introduced a constitutional amendment to impose a fifteen year term limit on serving in either chamber of the New Hampshire General Court.

=== Criminal Justice Reform ===
In 2021, Labranche co-sponsored a bipartisan bill to prohibit the use of no-knock warrants by law enforcement.

In 2022, Labranche introduced a bipartisan bill to legalize the recording of public officials so the state could come into compliance with Glik v. Cunniffe. Labranche also co-sponsored a bipartisan bill to prohibit law enforcement from using encrypted frequencies except in a few limited circumstances. Labranche also co-sponsored a bill to require law enforcement wear body-worn cameras. Labranche also co-sponsored a bill to require police departments to gather, analyze, and report demographic information relating to law enforcement "for arrests, citations, motor vehicle and subject stops and searches.".

=== Drug Policy ===
In 2022, Labranche introduced multiple bipartisan pieces of legislation to legalize cannabis. In that same year, Labranche also introduced bipartisan legislation to lower penalties and further decriminalize cannabis.

In 2021, Labranche cosponsored a bill to lower the penalty for personal possession of drugs. In 2022, Labranche introduced bipartisan legislation to decriminalize the personal possession of psilocybin mushrooms.

=== Electoral Reform ===
In 2021, Labranche co-sponsored a bill to reduce the electoral threshold for a political party to be given official party status.

Labranche is a strong proponent of Ranked Choice Voting (RCV). In 2022, Labranche introduced and cosponsored many pieces of legislation to implement Ranked Choice Voting. In the same year, Labranche proposed a constitutional amendment that would make 100 seats of the New Hampshire House of Representatives elected by party list proportional representation. In that same year, Labranche introduced a constitutional amendment that would lower the voting age to 17 to vote in primary elections for those who will be 18 by the general election.

=== Quebec Separatism ===
Labranche has repeatedly voiced his support for a free and independent Quebec. In May 2022, Labranche gave a speech commemorating Saint-Jean-Baptiste Day by giving a history of Quebec and calling for independence. Labranche is a member of the pro-independence Bloc Québécois.

=== Workers' Rights ===
Labranche is a strong proponent of workers' rights. In 2022 Labranche introduced a constitutional amendment that would enshrine the right to join a union in the New Hampshire Constitution. in that same year, Labranche introduced a constitutional amendment that would provide "that all workers have a right to a minimum wage that provides them with well-being and a dignified existence.". Additionally, Labranche introduced a bill to create a commission that would set the minimum wage independent of the legislature. Labranche also co-sponsored a bill to require time and a half be paid for workers who work hours previously unscheduled. Labranche also co-sponsored a bill to tax certain large. low-wage employers by imposing a tax on business that employ over 100 persons and pays less than $15 an hour. Labranche also introduced a bill to prohibit anti-union activity by employers. Labranche also introduced a bill to require that schools teach labor history. Labranche has repeatedly voted in favor of increasing the minimum wage. Labranche has consistently spoke against and voted against Right-to-Work legislation.

=== Miscellaneous ===
In 2022, Labranche introduced and passed a bill with bipartisan support to require a student representative from every public high school be on local school boards. Labranche also co-sponsored a bill to study imposing a tax on single-use plastics manufacturers.

== Election results ==
2020 Hillsborough 22nd New Hampshire House of Representatives Democratic primary
Party	Candidate	Votes	%
Democratic	Megan Murray (incumbent)	1,268	34.1
Democratic	Daniel Veilleux	919	24.7
Democratic	Tony Labranche	805	21.6
Democratic	Theresa Cheslock	723	19.4
Total votes		3,722	100.0

2020 Hillsborough 22nd New Hampshire House of Representatives General Election
Party	Candidate	Votes	%
Democratic	Megan Murray (incumbent)	4,012	18.6
Democratic	Daniel Veilleux	3,658	16.9
Democratic	Tony Labranche	3,641	16.8
Republican	Peter Hansen	3,567	16.5
Republican	Danielle Pray	3,395	15.7
Republican	Pamela Coughlin	3,339	15.4
Total votes		21,618	100.0

2024 Hillsborough County Register of Probate Democratic primary
Party	Candidate	Votes	%
Democratic	Tony Labranche	28,429	99.9
Total votes		28,513	100.0

2024 Hillsborough County Register of Probate General Election
Party	Candidate	Votes	%
Republican	Christopher Maidment	109,783	51.55
Democratic	Tony Labranche	103,010	48.37
Total votes		212,925	100.0
