= Peter Hansen (politician) =

American politician

Member of New Hampshire House of Representatives for Hillsborough 22
- In office 2010–2018

Personal details
- Party: Republican

Peter Hansen was a Republican member of the New Hampshire House of Representatives, representing Amherst. He was first elected in 2010. He was defeated in his fourth re-election bid in 2018.

In 2013, Hansen referred to women as "vaginas" in an e-mail to his House colleagues, as part of a discussion concerning the stand-your-ground law. After a widespread outcry, Hansen initially said the controversy had been "blown out of proportion", but later apologized for his choice of language.

== Electoral history ==
2018 New Hampshire House of Representatives election: Hillsborough 22 (Top 3 Elected)
Party	Candidate	Votes	%
Democratic	Megan Murray	3,243	18.8
Democratic	Julie Radhakrishnan	2,999	17.4
Republican	Reed Panasiti (Incumbent)	2,872	16.7
Democratic	Daniel Veilleux	2,859	16.6
Republican	Peter Hansen (incumbent)	2,726	15.8
Republican	Scott Courtemanche	2,521	14.6
Total votes		17,220	100.0
Democratic hold			
Democratic gain from Republican			
Republican hold			
