= Thrill killing =

Murder motivated by sheer excitement

A thrill killing is premeditated or random murder that is motivated by the sheer excitement of the act. While there have been attempts to categorize multiple murders, such as identifying "thrill killing" as a type of "hedonistic mass killing", actual details of events frequently overlap category definitions making attempts at such distinctions problematic.

Those identified as thrill killers are typically young males, but other profile characteristics may vary, according to Jack Levin, director of the Brudnick Center on Conflict and Violence at Northeastern University. The major common denominator among those who commit thrill killings is that they usually feel inadequate and are driven by a need to feel powerful. "To a certain extent, [thrill killers] may make their victims suffer so that they can feel good," said Levin. "Sadism is fairly common in thrill killings. The killer might torture, degrade, or rape their victim before they take the others' life." They frequently have an "ideal victim type" who has certain physical characteristics.

Thrill killers have been frequently romanticized in films.

== Documented incidents ==
- May 21, 1924: University students Nathan Leopold and Richard Loeb kidnapped and murdered 14-year-old Bobby Franks. Leopold, aged 19 at the time, and Loeb, 18, believed themselves to be Nietzschean Übermenschen who could commit a "perfect crime" (in this case a kidnapping and murder). Both were sentenced to life imprisonment plus 99 years; Loeb was murdered in prison in 1936, while Leopold was paroled in 1958 after serving 33 years, and died in 1971 of natural causes.
- September 13, 1931: Szilveszter Matuska, a clinically insane man had placed a high explosive charge on a railroad bridge near Biatorbágy, Hungary. The charge was set off under a passenger train headed from Budapest to Vienna, Austria, shortly after midnight, pushing the locomotive and six cars off the bridge. Matuska did not intend to kill anyone in particular; he just wanted to blow up any train that came next for his own amusement. The Budapest–Vienna train involved in the attack was late, and it overtook a freight train which was supposed to reach the bridge before it: 22 people died and 17 were seriously injured. The police found a handwritten note at a disaster site with Communist slogans and threats, and it was assumed that Communists had perpetrated a terrorist attack: the government used this as a pretext to declare martial law, and initiated a police crackdown on the illegal Communist Party of Hungary (MKP). Although Matuska was apprehended in Vienna in October 1931 and confessed to the bombing, martial law remained in effect, and two leading Communists were executed in 1932.
- December 18, 1968 – October 1969: The Zodiac Killer terrorized the San Francisco Bay Area in northern California, US. In cryptic letters he wrote to newspapers, he claimed killing people "is so much fun. It's even better than killing wild game in the forest because man is the most dangerous animal. To kill gives me the most thrilling experience. It's even better than getting your rocks off with a girl." There were five confirmed victims, however many more victims are suspected to have been killed by him.
- January 16, 1980: Werner Kniesek tortured and murdered a family of three in Sankt Pölten, Austria. He confessed to police that he had chosen the house at random, and that his motive was sheer desire to kill. Kniesek had been convicted of attempted murder in 1973, and was released on parole for good behavior the day before the murders.
- September 8, 1988: Twenty-year-old bank clerk Janine Balding was abducted from a railway station at Sutherland, New South Wales, Australia by five homeless youths with extensive criminal records, and driven to nearby Minchinbury where she was repeatedly raped by three of the male offenders before being bludgeoned, hog-tied and drowned in a reservoir. The ringleaders, 22-year-old Stephen Wayne 'Shorty' Jamieson, 16-year-old Matthew James Elliott, and 14-year-old Bronson Matthew Blessington, were arrested the next day and later sentenced to life imprisonment plus 25 years without the possibility of parole; Blessington and Elliott are the youngest offenders to receive this sentence in Australian history.
- September 15, 1990: Debra Holt, the mother of future world champion boxer Kendall Holt, and also known as Debra Holts and "Cocoa Tan", and three men she met while staying at the Alexander Hamilton Hotel, were convicted of killing a homeless man during an evening of senseless violence and crime in Paterson, New Jersey, US.
- August 19, 1992: Laborer and career criminal Andrew Peter Garforth murdered nine-year-old schoolgirl Ebony Simpson at Bargo, New South Wales, Australia. Garforth snatched Simpson as she walked home from school and threw her in the boot of his car, raped her repeatedly, bound her hands with speaker wire and weighted her schoolbag before throwing her into a dam where she drowned; he also joined the search for Simpson before being arrested. Garforth, who had 76 prior convictions, showed no remorse in court; he pleaded guilty and was sentenced to life imprisonment plus 30 years without the possibility of parole, with Justice Peter Newman calling the crime "chilling in the extreme".
- February 12, 1993: Two ten-year-old boys, Robert Thompson and Jon Venables, abducted and murdered toddler James Bulger in Liverpool, England. After skipping school together, Thompson and Venables engaged in a spree of petty criminal activity including shoplifting and vandalism at a local shopping mall before spotting Bulger alone and deciding to abduct him. After leading Bulger away from the mall, the boys took him to a railroad track, where they beat him with rocks and a metal bar before leaving him on the tracks in hopes he would be killed by a train. It was later determined that Bulger died from the beating well before his body was struck by a train. Thompson and Venables were imprisoned for eight years.
- October 29, 1995: Handyman, mechanic, and convicted sex offender Paul Stephen Osborne raped ten-year-old Leanne Oliver and nine-year-old Patricia Leedie before bashing them to death with a tree branch and a wheel jack at Warana Beach, Queensland, Australia. After drinking twelve beers and smoking marijuana at a barbecue, Osborne took the girls to the beach for a swim; Leanne Oliver's father, Alby Oliver, found Osborne's wallet and the girls' bodies in sand dunes the next morning, after which Osborne was arrested. When asked by police why he killed the girls, Osborne told police "I don't know. I don't know whether I blacked out or went crazy. They seemed pretty nice." Osborne pleaded guilty and was sentenced to two consecutive sentences of life imprisonment plus 36 years without the possibility of parole; in sentencing Osborne, Queensland Supreme Court Justice Glen Williams said that he was "beyond redemption".
- April 19, 1997: American teens, Thomas Koskovich and Jayson Vreeland, ordered a pizza and ambushed two delivery men, Georgio Gallara and Jeremy Giordano, outside of an abandoned house in Franklin, New Jersey, before going bowling. Koskovich and Vreeland told police they wanted to experience what it was like to commit murder.
- July 17, 1997: Jesse McAllister and Bradley Price killed a man and a woman in Seaside, Oregon, US only "to experience it [murder]."
- September 30, 1997: Eighteen-year-old American Todd Rizzo beat to death thirteen-year-old Stanley Edwards using a three-pound sledgehammer, after he lured Edwards with a promise to hunt snakes in his backyard. Rizzo was convicted of the murder in 1999 and sentenced to death, being put on Connecticut's death row. Later Rizzo was re-sentenced to life imprisonment.
- October 6, 1997: Bega schoolgirl murders: New Zealand-born career criminal Lindsay Hoani Beckett and Victorian prison escapee Leslie Alfred Camilleri murdered fourteen-year-old Lauren Barry and sixteen-year-old Nichole Collins at Fiddler's Green Creek, Victoria, Australia. After accepting an offer of a ride to a party, the girls were abducted, raped and tortured over the next ten and a half hours, before Beckett stabbed them on Camilleri's orders; Beckett and Camilleri then drove back to Yass and had breakfast. Beckett pleaded guilty and was sentenced to two consecutive sentences of life imprisonment with a non-parole period of 35 years in exchange for testifying against Camilleri, who was found guilty and sentenced to two consecutive sentences of life imprisonment plus 155 years without the possibility of parole. In sentencing the men, Victorian Supreme Court Justice Frank Vincent told Beckett that "You represent the dark in which our women and children fearfully walk", and told Camilleri that "Through your own actions, you have forfeited your right ever to walk among us again". Camilleri was sentenced in 2013 to an additional and cumulative 28 years for the murder of fourteen-year-old Prue Bird in Glenroy, Victoria, on February 2, 1992.
- May 25, 2002: In what was described as a "sick game", Benjamin Sifrit and his wife Erika lured 32-year-old Joshua Ford and his 51-year-old girlfriend Martha "Geney" Crutchley to their Ocean City, Maryland, US, condo and ordered them to disrobe before shooting Ford three times and stabbing Crutchley several times in the abdomen. Their bodies were then dismembered and disposed of in Delaware. After separate trials, Benjamin Sifrit was sentenced to 38 years imprisonment and Erika Sifrit to life imprisonment plus 20 years.
- March 29, 2005: James Patrick Roughan, nephew of convicted killer Katherine Knight, and his friend, Christopher Clark Jones, stabbed and bashed seventeen-year-old Morgan Jay Shepherd over 130 times before decapitating him with an axe in Dayboro, Queensland, Australia, after a lengthy drinking session; Shepherd's head was used as a puppet and bowling ball, according to witnesses. Both men were sentenced to life imprisonment with a non-parole period of 27 years; three youths who cannot be named because of their age were sentenced to two years detention for helping dispose of the body.
- May 2005-August 2006: Two men in Phoenix, Arizona, US (dubbed "Serial Shooter" by the media), Dale Hausner and Samuel Dieteman, went on a year-long random shooting spree. The murderers referred to their actions as "Random recreational violence". Eight people were killed in the spree and seventeen injured. Both men were found guilty.
- June 18, 2006: Two sixteen-year-old girls, who cannot be named because of their age, strangled Eliza Jane Davis with electrical cable and buried her body under a vacant house in Collie, Western Australia, Australia, after the three attended a party. The girls told police they knew it was wrong to kill but it "felt right", and they did not regret Davis' death. Both girls were sentenced to life imprisonment with a non-parole period of fifteen years.
- September 22, 2006: High school students Brian Draper and Torey Adamcik murdered their sixteen year old classmate Cassie Jo Stoddart in her aunt and uncle's house in Pocatello, Idaho, United States. Draper and Adamcik were given life sentences without the possibility of parole in 2007.
- December 17, 2006: Couple Jessica Ellen Stasinowsky, twenty, and Valerie Paige Parashumti, nineteen, drugged, beat, and strangled their sixteen-year-old flatmate, Stacey Mitchell, before disposing of her body in a wheelie bin in Lathlain, Western Australia. Parashumti and Stasinowsky originally told police that Mitchell had moved to Queensland after an argument, but later confessed to the crime; they had discussed killing people on several occasions. Both women pleaded guilty and were sentenced to life imprisonment with a non-parole period of 24 years, which was increased to 31 years on appeal under new legislation, at the time the longest non-parole period handed down to a woman in Australian history. Justice Peter Blaxell said that, had the women been convicted by a jury, he would have sentenced them to life imprisonment without the possibility of release on parole.
- June 25, 2007 – July 16, 2007: Over the course of three weeks, two young men, Viktor Sayenko and Igor Suprunyuck, murdered 21 people, in Ukraine. No apparent motive for the murders was found. Many photographs and videos were taken by the killers as a "memory" of their brutal spree; one video leaked onto the Internet. Both were sentenced to life in prison.
- March 11, 2009, Winnenden school shooting: Tim Kretschmer killed fifteen and injured nine in his former high school before carjacking a vehicle at gun point from auto mechanic Igor Wolf. When asked by Wolf why he was doing it, he responded "For fun, because it's fun", he went on to say "Do you think we can find another school?".
- October 4, 2009: Teenagers Steven Spader and Christopher Gribble murdered Kimberly Cates and severely injured her daughter Jamie during a home invasion in Mont Vernon, New Hampshire, US. Both were assaulted with a machete; seventeen-year-old Spader admitted hacking Kimberley Cates to death with 36 blows to the head and torso. Spader had formed a club he called "The Disciples of Destruction" shortly before the murder, to which he recruited his confederates. Spader designed a logo with the initials "D.O.D." Spader told his recruits that the home invasion was to be a rite of "initiation" for club members. Both Spader and Gribble were sentenced to life in prison, while three other accomplices are also serving prison time. Apparently content with his life sentence, Spader informed his attorneys during an April 2013 resentencing hearing that he did not want a reduction in sentence, describing himself as “the most sick and twisted person you’ll ever meet.”
- October 21, 2009: Fifteen-year-old Alyssa Bustamante stabbed and strangled her nine-year-old neighbor Elizabeth Olten in St. Martins, Missouri, USA. She later wrote in her diary: "I just fucking killed someone. I strangled them and slit their throat and stabbed them now they're dead. I don't know how to feel atm [at the moment]," adding "It was amazing. As soon as you get over the 'ohmygawd I can't do this' feeling, it's pretty enjoyable." Bustamante had a history of depression and suicide attempts as well as a turbulent domestic situation. Her mother abandoned her as a child and her father was in prison for much of her childhood.
- April 14, 2013: Fifteen-year-old Daniel William Marsh tortured, stabbed, murdered, and mutilated Oliver Northup Jr. and Claudia Maupin in Davis, California, US. Marsh had long been fantasizing about torturing and murdering people and desired to become a serial killer. He told investigators that the murders gave him a feeling of "pure happiness" which lingered for weeks.
- April 15, 2021: A former employee, Brandon Scott Hole, attacked a FedEx warehouse killing eight and injuring seven, four by gunfire, before turning the gun on himself. Police gave one of the motives for the shooting as Hole fulfilling his desire to experience killing people.
- May 9, 2021: Fourteen-year-old Aiden Fucci murdered his thirteen-year-old schoolmate, Tristyn Bailey; stabbing her 114 times. Judge R. Lee Smith characterized Bailey's murder as the most shocking case to occur in St. Johns County, Florida, US, saying that Bailey's murder had no motive, and that Fucci murdered Bailey just to feel the sensation of killing. In months leading up to the murder, Fucci had been telling his friends that he wanted to kill someone by "taking them to the woods and stabbing them" and told them to expect the murder to happen "within the month".

== See also ==
- Blood sport
- Lust murder
- Spree killer
