= Reed Panasiti =

Member of the New Hampshire House of Representatives from the Hillsborough County District 22 district
- In office December 7, 2016 – December 2, 2020

Personal details
- Party: Republican
- Education: Pepperdine University (MA)

Reed Panasiti was a Republican member of the New Hampshire House of Representatives, representing Amherst. He was first elected in 2016. He was re-elected in 2018 but chose not to run again in 2020.

== Education ==
Panasiti received a Masters of Arts in human resources management in 1977 at Pepperdine University.

== Political career ==
Panasiti was first elected to the New Hampshire House of Representatives in 2016. He won re-election in 2018. He chose to not run for re-election in 2020. Panasiti served as Assistant Republican Floor Leader during the 2018-2020 biennium.

== Election results ==
Hillsborough District 22 General Election, 2018
Party	Candidate	Votes	%
Democratic	Megan Murray	3,243	18.8
Democratic	Julie Radhakrishnan	2,999	17.4
Republican	Reed Panasiti (Incumbent)	2,872	16.7
Democratic	Daniel Veilleux	2,859	16.6
Republican	Peter Hansen (incumbent)	2,726	15.8
Republican	Scott Courtemanche	2,521	14.6
Total votes		17,220	100.0
Democratic hold			
Democratic gain from Republican			
Republican hold			
