= Amherst (CDP), New Hampshire =

Census-designated place in New Hampshire, United States

Amherst, New Hampshire
- Census-designated place
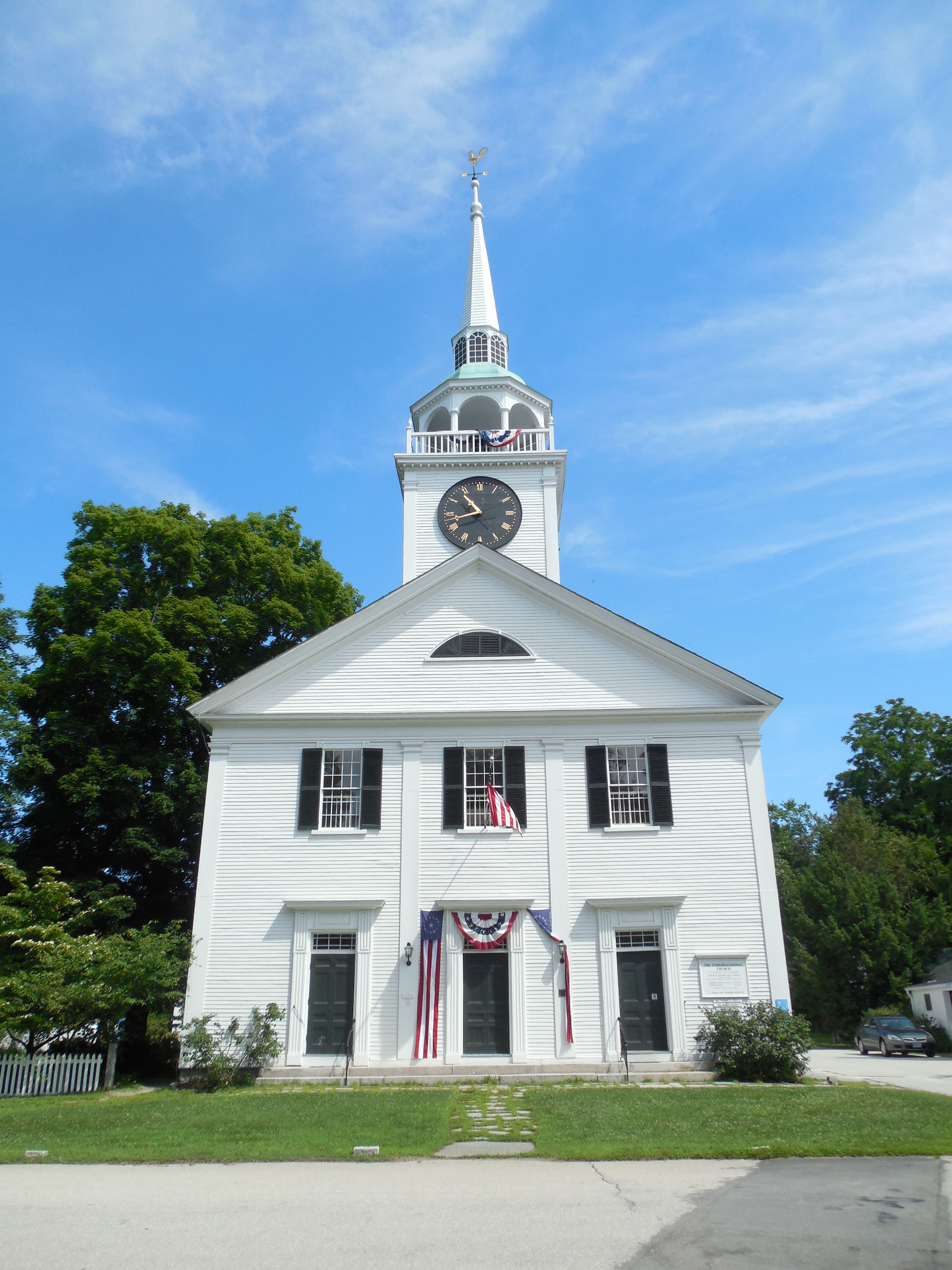
- Congregational Church of Amherst

- Location within New Hampshire Location within the United States
- Coordinates: 42°51′49″N 71°37′32″W
- Country: United States
- State: New Hampshire
- County: Hillsborough
- Town: Amherst

Area
  - Total: 0.73 sq mi (1.88 km^{2})
  - Land: 0.73 sq mi (1.88 km^{2})
  - Water: 0 sq mi (0.00 km^{2})
- Elevation: 264 ft (80 m)

Population (2020)
  - Total: 697
  - Density: 960/sq mi (370.5/km^{2})
- Time zone: UTC-5 (Eastern (EST))
  - Summer (DST): UTC-4 (EDT)
- ZIP code: 03031
- Area code: 603
- FIPS code: 33-01220
- GNIS feature ID: 2629710

Amherst is a census-designated place (CDP) and the main village in the town of Amherst, New Hampshire, United States. The population of the CDP was 697 at the 2020 census, out of 11,753 in the entire town. The village center is listed on the National Register of Historic Places as the Amherst Village Historic District.

== Geography ==
The CDP is in the central part of the town of Amherst, bordered to the east by New Hampshire Route 101; to the south by Thornton Ferry Road, Courthouse Road, and Atherton Lane; to the west by Old Milford Road and the west edge of Meadow View Cemetery; and to the north by Jones Road, Mack Hill Road, and Manchester Road.

Route 101 leads northeast 10 miles (16 km) to the start of the Manchester bypass, and southwest 10 miles (16 km) to Wilton. Milford is 2.5 miles (4.0 km) to the southwest via Amherst Street.

According to the U.S. Census Bureau, the Amherst CDP has a total area of 0.73 square miles (1.88 km^{2}), all land.

== Demographics ==
Historical population
Census	Pop.	Note	%±
2010	613		—
2020	697		13.7%
U.S. Decennial Census

As of the census of 2010, there were 613 people, 241 households, and 186 families residing in the CDP. There were 254 housing units, of which 13, or 5.1%, were vacant. The racial makeup of the CDP was 99.0% white, 0.0% African American, 0.0% Native American, 0.7% Asian, 0.0% Pacific Islander, 0.0% some other race, and 0.3% from two or more races. 0.8% of the population were Hispanic or Latino of any race.

Of the 241 households in the CDP, 38.2% had children under the age of 18 living with them, 65.1% were headed by married couples living together, 9.5% had a female householder with no husband present, and 22.8% were non-families. 19.9% of all households were made up of individuals, and 12.0% were someone living alone who was 65 years of age or older. The average household size was 2.54, and the average family size was 2.94.

27.1% of residents in the CDP were under the age of 18, 3.9% were from age 18 to 24, 18.0% were from 25 to 44, 31.2% were from 45 to 64, and 19.9% were 65 years of age or older. The median age was 45.6 years. For every 100 females, there were 88.6 males. For every 100 females age 18 and over, there were 89.4 males.

For the period 2011–15, the estimated median annual income for a household was $112,344, and the median income for a family was $141,382. The per capita income for the CDP was $63,381. 4.3% of the population and 0.0% of families were below the poverty line, along with 0.0% of people under the age of 18 and 0.0% of people 65 or older.
