= Jennifer Morton =

Jennifer Morton may refer to:

- Jenny Morton, New Zealand neurobiologist and academic
- Jennifer Morton (politician), member of the New Hampshire House of Representatives
