= Moses Billings =

American painter

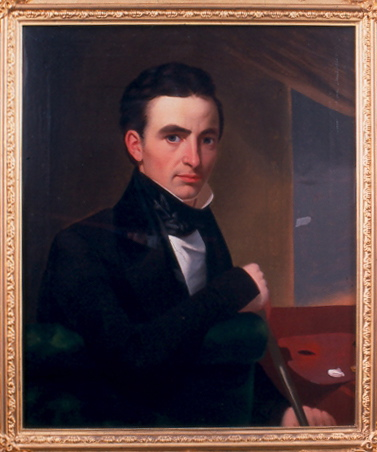
- Self-portrait by Moses Billings, c. 1835
- Born: January 15, 1809; Amherst, New Hampshire, U.S.
- Died: August 14, 1884 (aged 75); Erie, Pennsylvania, U.S.
- Known for: Portrait painting

Moses Billings (January 15, 1809 – August 14, 1884) was an American painter and photographer known mainly for his portraits. He was born in Amherst, New Hampshire, but spent most of his life residing and working in Erie, Pennsylvania.

== Early life ==
Moses Billings was born in Amherst, New Hampshire, on January 15, 1809. Little is known of his early life. According to a variety of sources, he appeared at some point in his early life in Cincinnati; Orange County, New York; Cleveland; Massachusetts; and in other places in New England. It is likely that during his early life, he learned the skills of a cobbler, for he is listed in the 1831 Cincinnati City Directory as a shoemaker/cobbler. He married Jane Wilkins (daughter of Thomas and Mary Wallace Wilkins, a prominent family in Erie at the time) on October 27, 1835.

== Influences ==
Billings was self-taught, and "born with all the instincts of an artist". It is not known exactly what his influences were, though a number of potential influences have been suggested. Much of his knowledge of art most likely came from engravings, lithographs, and prints of famous works. It is also likely that Billings was familiar with the work of Samuel F. B. Morse. Upon Morse's return from Europe, he attempted to implement elements of history painting he had learned from his teacher, Benjamin West. When his attempts proved largely unsuccessful, he turned to portrait painting. Morse traveled extensively in Massachusetts and New Hampshire from 1816 to 1820, and lived in Concord, New Hampshire, for a while, a mere 30 miles (48 km) from Billings' home in Amherst at the time.

James Bowman, another portrait painter, did work in Erie for a brief time starting in 1817. However, given the relatively primitive and flat style of his portraits, and given the brevity of the time he actually spent in Erie, it seems unlikely that Bowman had a significant influence on Billings.

== Works ==
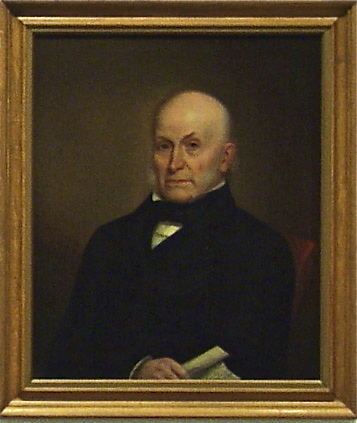
Moses Billings' portrait of former president John Quincy Adams

Billings' first work that earned him public notice was a full-length portrait of first U.S. president George Washington. The painting was entitled The Father Of His Country, and was paraded by two ponies in a political procession on September 10, 1840. The local newspaper reported the next day that "the great colored portrait of George Washington added color to the parade." This portrait was painted more to garner attention of the public eye, and it did not necessarily exemplify his style. However, it did help to begin his career as a permanent portrait artist in Erie. To make a living, Billings often had to also accept jobs that were not strictly portraiture, such as sign painting, furniture decorating, and other more craft-oriented tasks. However, unlike James Bowman a few decades earlier, Billings was successfully able to maintain a career as a portrait painter permanently located in Erie (though he did spend a few months at a time in larger cities when his business in Erie began to slow).

With the development of the daguerreotype in the 1840s, the role of the portrait painter declined in general, because it was now much easier and much cheaper to have one's likeness presented in a visual format. While many portrait painters lost business in competition with the daguerreotype, Billings instead began to produce daguerreotype prints himself. It is not known exactly which prints were made by Moses Billings, as daguerreotypes were usually signed, when signed at all, along the side of the plate. Due to the traditional storing methods of daguerreotype plates, even this signature usually quickly became illegible. However, it has been generally noted, or at least hypothesized, that his daguerreotype prints showed a level of talent and artistry above that of amateur daguerreotypists. Though it is not known exactly which prints were his, it is known that he had largely abandoned the process by the 1850s. Even after he stopped making daguerreotypes, he did continue to paint people's portraits on canvas.

In February 1846, Billings spent a good deal of time working in Washington, D.C. There, he painted portraits of various figures of political importance, most notably Dolley Madison and John Quincy Adams. The portrait of Adams is noted for its lack of the severity of expression with which Adams is often depicted, capturing what Adams himself called "the true portraiture of the heart". The Adams portrait is among the works in the permanent collection of Thiel College in Greenville, Pennsylvania. The portrait of Dolley Madison was lost sometime in the late 1920s, and remains missing to this day.

While Moses Billings never gained national recognition on a major scale, he had a great deal of success on the local scale as a portrait painter. He continued to paint until around 1880, when his deteriorating health no longer allowed him to do so. When he died in 1884, his work was displayed in Washington, D.C., Cincinnati, Cleveland, and various places in northwestern Pennsylvania.
