= Murder of Kimberly Cates =

2009 murder in New Hampshire, United States

- Location: Mont Vernon, New Hampshire, U.S.
- Date: October 4, 2009; 17 years ago
- Attack type: Murder by stabbing, attempted pedicide, home invasion
- Weapon: Machete
- Deaths: Kimberly Cates, aged 42
- Injuries: Jaimie Cates
- Perpetrators: Steven Spader; Christopher Gribble; William Marks; Quinn Glover; Autumn Savoy (as an accessory)
- Motive: Thrill, robbery
- Verdict: Spader and Gribble: Guilty on all counts Marks, Glover, Savoy: Pleaded guilty
- Convictions: Spader and Gribble: First-degree murder (2 counts); Attempted murder; Conspiracy to commit murder; Conspiracy to commit burglary; Tampering with witnesses or informants; Marks: Conspiracy to commit murder; Burglary; First-degree assault; Glover: Burglary; Robbery; Conspiracy to commit burglary; Savoy: Conspiracy, hindering apprehension
- Sentence: Spader and Gribble: Two consecutive life sentences without the possibility of parole, (Note: First life sentence without the possibility of parole, second life sentence with the possibility of parole after 50 years.) plus 26-to-52 years Marks: 30-to-60 years in prison Glover: 20-to-40 years in prison Savoy: 5-to-12 years in prison

The murder of Kimberly Cates was a thrill killing that attracted national attention in the United States due to the crime's brutality, the randomness by which the home was chosen with intent to murder (the victims and perpetrators did not know each other prior to the home invasion), the apparent lack of remorse, and the perpetrators’ ages.

Teenagers Steven Spader and Christopher Gribble broke into Cates' home, resulting in her death by machete and the severe injury of her 11-year-old daughter. The murder was intended as an initiation rite to a new club known as "The Disciples of Destruction." Spader was the club's founder.

== Incident ==
On October 4, 2009, 17-year-old Steven Spader and 19-year-old Christopher Gribble murdered Kimberly Cates (age 42) and severely maimed her 11-year-old daughter, Jaimie, during a home invasion in Mont Vernon, New Hampshire. Both victims were assaulted with a machete. Spader admitted to hacking Kimberly Cates to death with 36 blows to the head and torso.

A former Boy Scout, Spader was a high school dropout who passed the GED high school equivalency exam. Spader had formed a club he called "The Disciples of Destruction" shortly before the murder, from which he recruited his confederates. Spader designed a logo with the initials D.O.D. Spader told his recruits that the home invasion was to be a rite of "initiation" for club members.

== Sentencing ==
Both Spader and Gribble were sentenced to life in prison without parole. Two accomplices who accompanied them, William Marks and Quinn Glover, were sentenced to 30-60 years and 20-40 years respectively. A fifth person, Autumn Savoy, was convicted of hiding evidence and lying to investigators.

Because of the U.S. Supreme Court's Miller v. Alabama 2012 ruling that limited the sentencing of minors to mandatory life sentences, Spader was granted a new sentencing hearing. Apparently content with his life sentence, Spader informed his attorneys during an April 2013 resentencing hearing that he did not want a reduction in sentence, describing himself as "the most sick and twisted person you'll ever meet". He did not appear at the hearing.

The State of New Hampshire claimed that Spader lacked remorse, considering it "unnecessary" and a form of weakness, and likely would commit more crimes upon release from prison. His sentence of life plus 76 years was upheld. In May 2013, the New Hampshire Supreme Court allowed Spader to drop the appeal of his conviction. His appellate attorney told the press that Spader did not want to appeal for "personal and moral reasons". Spader was moved to New Jersey State Prison in February 2014 and subsequently sustained injuries in a prison fight.

In October 2014, Gribble sought a reduction in his sentence for his non-murder charges based on his young age; the court did not rule immediately.

== Effect ==
The murder led to the New Hampshire legislature expanding the crimes punishable by the death penalty to include murder during a home invasion. On May 30, 2019, the state repealed the death penalty, after state senators overrode a veto by Governor Chris Sununu. Prisoners who had been convicted of capital murders committed before that date did not have their sentences commuted to life in prison, as the repeal was not retroactive.

== See also ==
- Capital punishment in New Hampshire
