= Purgatory Brook =

- Location within New Hampshire Location within the United States

Location
- Country: United States
- State: New Hampshire
- County: Hillsborough
- Towns: Mont Vernon, Lyndeborough, Milford

Physical characteristics
- Source
  - location: Mont Vernon
  - coordinates: 42°53′43″N 71°43′28″W
  - elevation: 765 ft (233 m)
- Mouth: Souhegan River
  - location: Milford
  - coordinates: 42°50′48″N 71°40′56″W
  - elevation: 246 ft (75 m)
- Length: 5.8 mi (9.3 km)

Basin features
- Tributaries
  - left: Black Brook
  - right: Curtis Brook

Purgatory Brook is a 5.8-mile-long (9.3 km) tributary of the Souhegan River in southern New Hampshire. It rises in a marshy area on the border of Lyndeborough and Mont Vernon, and flows south over three small waterfalls, intersecting the Souhegan in Milford. For much of its length, it constitutes the border between Lyndeborough and Mont Vernon.

Mont Vernon town histories say it is unclear where the name "Purgatory" came from. At least one other brook with the same name exists in nearby Massachusetts.

The northernmost cascade, Upper Purgatory Falls, drew many visitors in the late 19th and early 20th century when Mont Vernon was home to a number of hotels that drew summer visitors from the heat of Boston. At one time the area had a dance hall and a bowling alley, as well as camping sites - none of which exist today. Evidence of railings around the upper falls are still visible. Town-wide celebrations drew hundreds of people up through the Great Depression, according to Mont Vernon town histories.

Today the upper falls can be reached on the Mont Vernon side by four-wheel drive vehicles, and on the Lyndeborough side by a short walk from a town-maintained road. The lowest waterfall can only be reached by a short hiking trail from a parking lot, which has been closed due to overcrowding spurred by the COVID-19 pandemic. The middle waterfall can be reached by a hiking public trail that runs the length of the brook.

== See also ==
- List of rivers of New Hampshire
