= Jennifer Morton (politician) =

American politician

Member of the New Hampshire House of Representatives from the Hillsborough 34th district
- Incumbent
- Assumed office December 7, 2022
- Preceded by: Tony Labranche
- Succeeded by: Stephanie Grund

Personal details
- Party: Democratic

Jennifer Morton is an American politician. She served as a Democratic member for the Hillsborough 34th district of the New Hampshire House of Representatives during the 2022-2024 session. She served on the Fish and Game and Marine Resources Committee.

== Personal life ==
Morton resides in Amherst, New Hampshire.
