= West Branch Souhegan River =

- Location within New Hampshire Location within the United States

Location
- Country: United States
- State: New Hampshire
- County: Hillsborough
- Town: New Ipswich

Physical characteristics
- Source: Confluence of Pratt Pond Brook and Fox Brook
  - location: New Ipswich
  - coordinates: 42°44′13″N 71°53′14″W
  - elevation: 1,050 ft (320 m)
- Mouth: Souhegan River
  - location: New Ipswich
  - coordinates: 42°43′52″N 71°50′47″W
  - elevation: 927 ft (283 m)
- Length: 3.1 mi (5.0 km)

Basin features
- Tributaries
  - left: Stark Brook

The West Branch of the Souhegan River is a 3.1-mile-long (5.0 km) river in southern New Hampshire in the United States. It is a tributary of the Souhegan River, which flows to the Merrimack River and ultimately to the Gulf of Maine.

The West Branch is located entirely in the town of New Ipswich, New Hampshire. It begins at the junction of Fox Brook and Pratt Pond Brook, southwest of the town center, and flows east through the settlement known as Smithville, ending at its junction with the South Branch of the Souhegan River north of Gibson Four Corners.

== See also ==
- List of rivers of New Hampshire
