= Baboosic Lake =

Lake in New Hampshire, United States

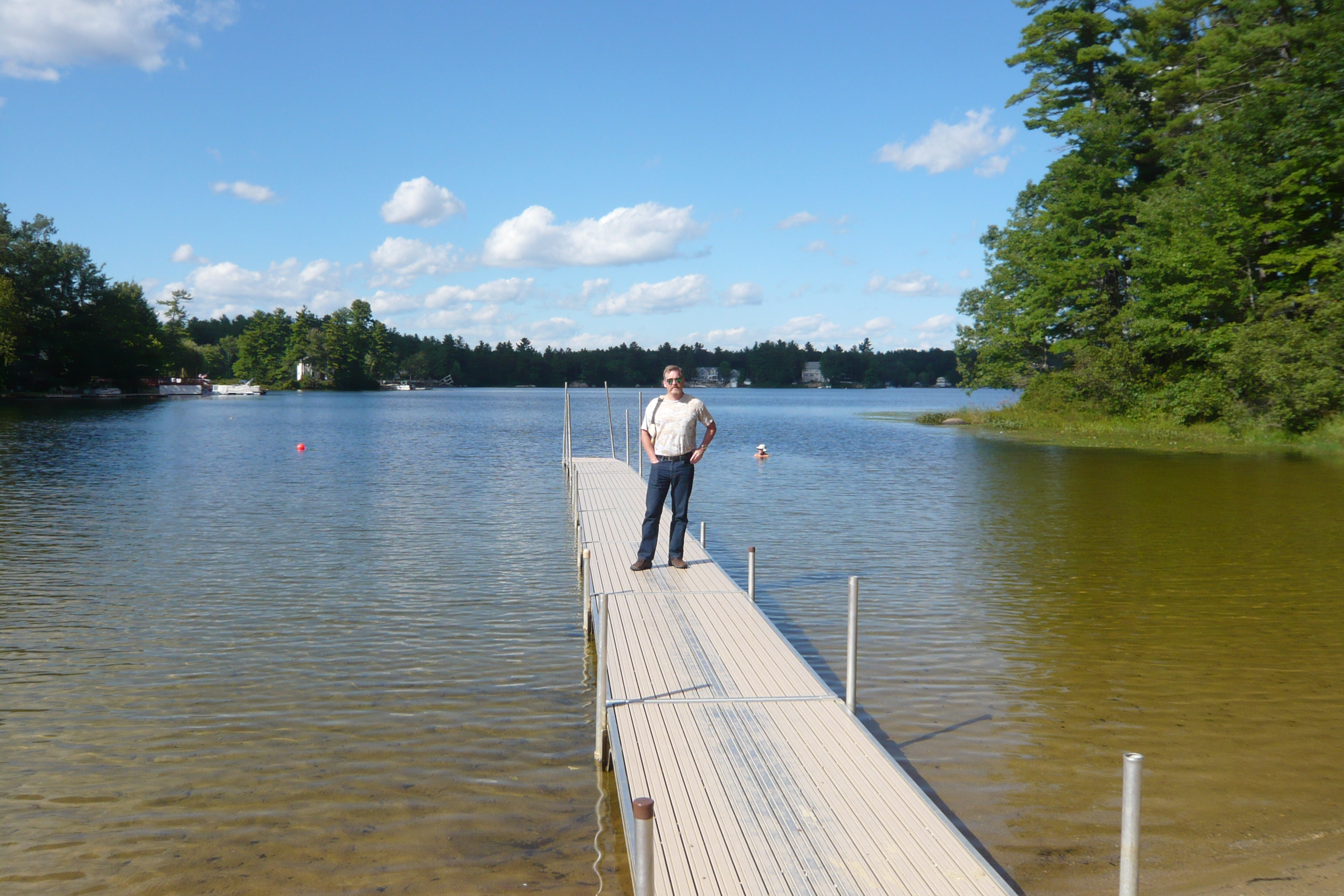

- Location within New Hampshire Location within the United States
- Location: Hillsborough County, New Hampshire
- Coordinates: 42°53′02″N 71°34′38″W
- Primary outflows: Baboosic Brook
- Basin countries: United States
- Max. length: 1.4 mi (2.3 km)
- Max. width: 0.4 mi (0.64 km)
- Surface area: 228.5 acres (92.5 ha)
- Average depth: 10 ft (3.0 m)
- Max. depth: 26 ft (7.9 m)
- Surface elevation: 232 ft (71 m)
- Settlements: Amherst; Merrimack

Baboosic Lake (buh-BOO-sik) is a 228.5-acre (92.5 ha) lake on the border of the towns of Amherst and Merrimack, in New Hampshire. The lake drains into Baboosic Brook, a tributary of the Merrimack River.

Baboosic is a "warm water lake" and supports fish species such as chain pickerel, largemouth bass, yellow perch, catfish, and many sunfish. During winter months the lake freezes and is suitable for ice fishing, ice skating and snowmobiling.

Baboosic was once a popular destination for vacationers who traveled via the historical Boston & Maine Railroad Manchester & Milford branch train.

Camp Young Judaea, a Jewish summer camp for children ages 8–15, is on the lake.

== See also ==
- List of lakes in New Hampshire
