= South Branch Souhegan River =

- Location within New Hampshire Location within Massachusetts Location within the United States

Location
- Country: United States
- States: Massachusetts, New Hampshire
- Counties: Worcester, MA, Middlesex, MA, Hillsborough, NH
- Towns: Ashburnham, MA, Ashby, MA, New Ipswich, NH

Physical characteristics
- Source: Stodge Meadow Pond
  - location: Ashburnham, MA
  - coordinates: 42°40′11″N 71°52′53″W
  - elevation: 1,129 ft (344 m)
- Mouth: Souhegan River
  - location: New Ipswich, NH
  - coordinates: 42°43′52″N 71°50′47″W
  - elevation: 927 ft (283 m)
- Length: 5.8 mi (9.3 km)

The South Branch of the Souhegan River is a 5.8-mile-long (9.3 km) river located in northern Massachusetts and southern New Hampshire in the United States. It is a tributary of the Souhegan River, which flows to the Merrimack River and ultimately to the Gulf of Maine.

The South Branch begins near Mount Watatic at the outlet of Stodge Meadow Pond in the town of Ashburnham, Massachusetts, and flows north through a chain of small lakes (Marble Pond, Ward Pond, and Watatic Pond) before turning northeast into the town of Ashby, Massachusetts. North of Ashby, the river enters New Ipswich, New Hampshire, passes through a small flood control reservoir, and joins the West Branch to form the Souhegan River, just north of the intersection known as "Gibson Four Corners".

== See also ==
- List of rivers of Massachusetts
- List of rivers of New Hampshire
