= Lamson Farm =

- U.S. National Register of Historic Places
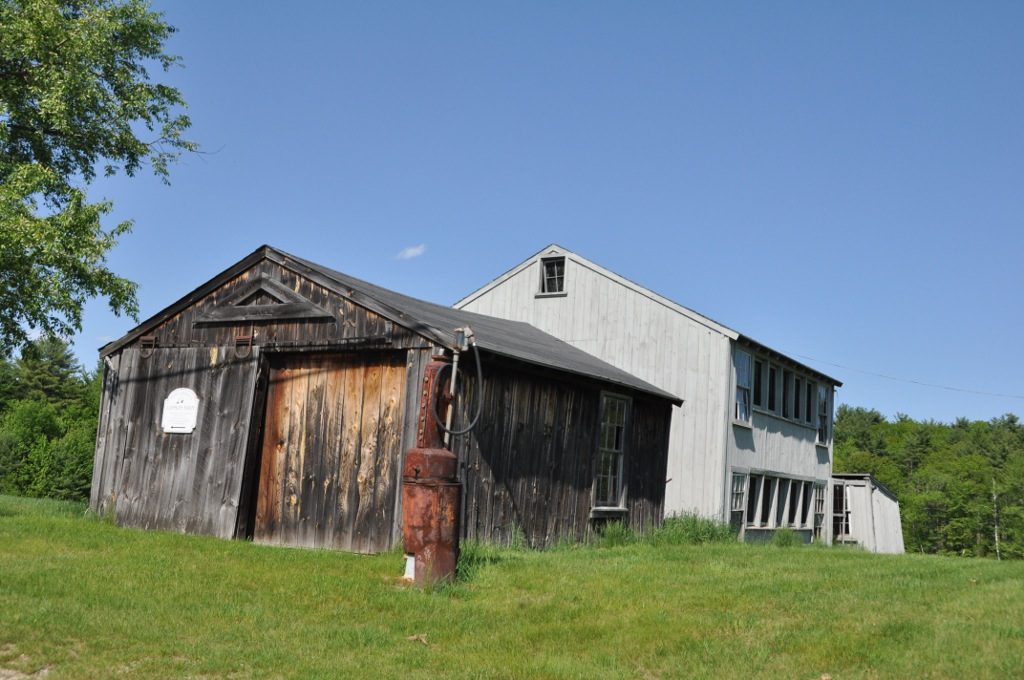
- Outbuildings of the farm

- Location within New Hampshire Location within the United States
- Location: Lamson Road, Mont Vernon, New Hampshire
- Coordinates: 42°55′17″N 71°41′7″W
- Area: 310 acres (130 ha)
- Built: c. 1770
- NRHP reference No.: 81000072
- Added to NRHP: February 24, 1981

Lamson Farm is a historic farm property on Lamson Road in Mont Vernon, New Hampshire. Founded in the 1770s and operated as a farm until 1975, it is one of the few surviving intact 19th-century farm properties in the community. Its land, over 300 acres (120 ha) in size, is now town-owned conservation and farmland. The property has trails open to the public, and an annual celebration of Lamson Farm Day is held here every September. The property was added to the National Register of Historic Places in 1981.

== Description and history ==
Lamson Farm is located about 1.5 miles (2.4 km) north of the town center of Mont Vernon. Its built infrastructure is located on and around open fields at the junction of Lamson and Cross Roads, northwest of New Hampshire Route 13. The property consists of about 310 acres (130 ha), extending in a roughly rectangular shape north to the town line with New Boston. The northernmost sections of the property are wooded and hilly, with a spur of Lamson Road (now part of the trail network) extending north toward the top of McCollom Hill, at 950 feet (290 m) the high point of the property. The hill was historically the site of a blueberry patch and apple orchard, features that are giving way to forest.

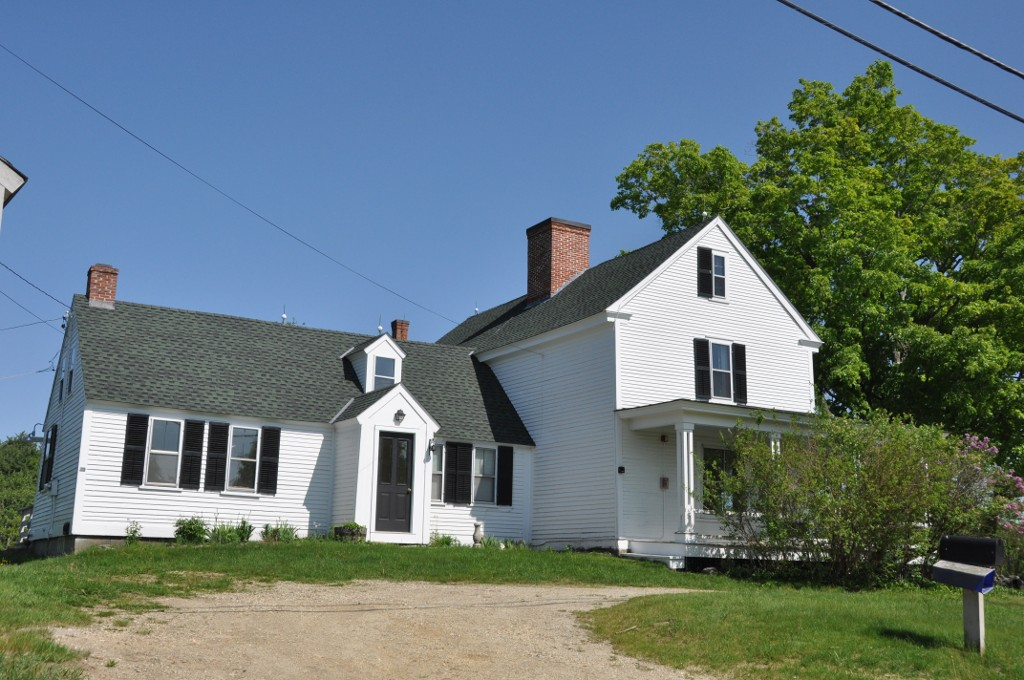
The farmhouse

The built infrastructure of the farm consists of eleven buildings, located along either side of Lamson Road. The main house is on the east side, consisting of a multi-section structure whose core is a Cape style 1-1/2 story timber frame house built about 1770. Most of the outbuildings date to the early 20th century; the main cow barn, made by combining two older structures, has at least one section dating to the early 19th century. Located northeast of the farmstead are the foundational remains of a second farm property, which was purchased by the Lamsons in the early 20th century. Located near the junction of Lamson and Cross Streets is a stone foundation which once held a small district schoolhouse.

The property was first developed by William Lamson, a native of Ipswich, Massachusetts. The farm was worked continuously by members of the Lamson family until 1975, and was at mid-20th century the largest dairy farming operation in the town. The town acquired the property in 1975 in order to preserve it as a vital reminder of its agricultural history.

== See also ==
- National Register of Historic Places listings in Hillsborough County, New Hampshire
