= Baboosic Brook =

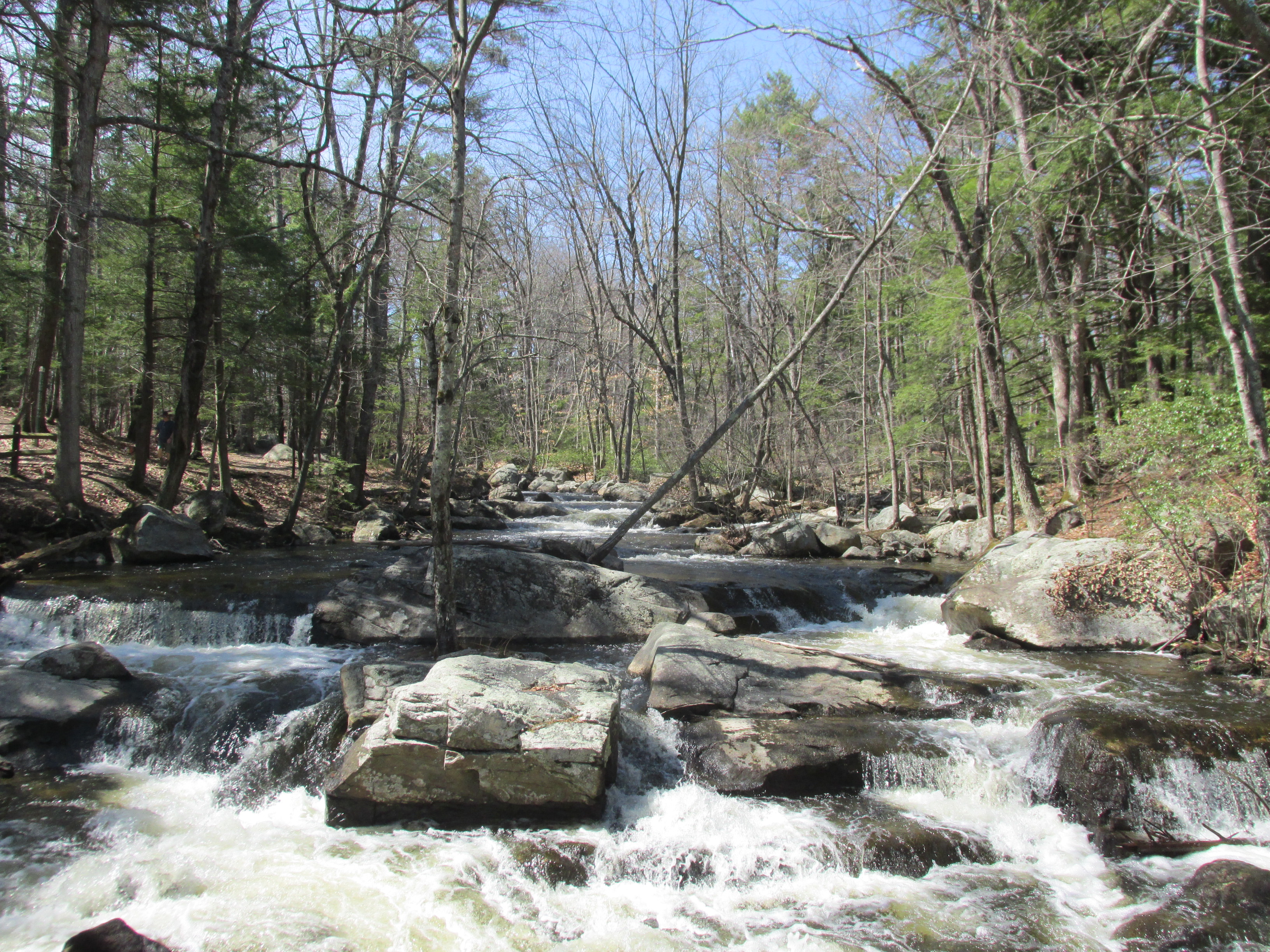
- Baboosic Brook in Twin Bridges Park

- Location within New Hampshire Location within the United States

Location
- Country: United States
- State: New Hampshire
- County: Hillsborough
- Towns: Amherst, Bedford, Merrimack

Physical characteristics
- Source: Baboosic Lake
  - location: Amherst, Hillsborough County, New Hampshire
  - coordinates: 42°53′34″N 71°34′51″W
  - elevation: 232 ft (71 m)
- Mouth: Souhegan River
  - location: Merrimack, Hillsborough County, New Hampshire
  - coordinates: 42°51′46″N 71°29′27″W
  - elevation: 95 ft (29 m)
- Length: 12.7 mi (20.4 km)

Basin features
- Tributaries
  - left: Joe English Brook, Pulpit Brook, McQuade Brook, Riddle Brook

Baboosic Brook is a 12.7-mile-long (20.4 km) stream located in southern New Hampshire in the United States. It is a tributary of the Souhegan River, which flows to the Merrimack River and ultimately to the Gulf of Maine.

Baboosic Brook begins at the outlet of Baboosic Lake in the town of Amherst, New Hampshire. The brook takes a winding course (east- and southward flow predominating) through the towns of Amherst, Bedford, and Merrimack before ending at the Souhegan River near its outlet to the Merrimack River.

Tributaries include Joe English Brook, Pulpit Brook, McQuade Brook, and Riddle Brook, all entering from the north.

== Wildlife ==
Baboosic Brook is home to a variety of wildlife, including the North American beaver, brook trout, and the common snapping turtle. The majority of the brook's fish population are pumpkinseed and chain pickerel.

== See also ==
- List of rivers of New Hampshire
