= Souhegan River =

River in New Hampshire, United States

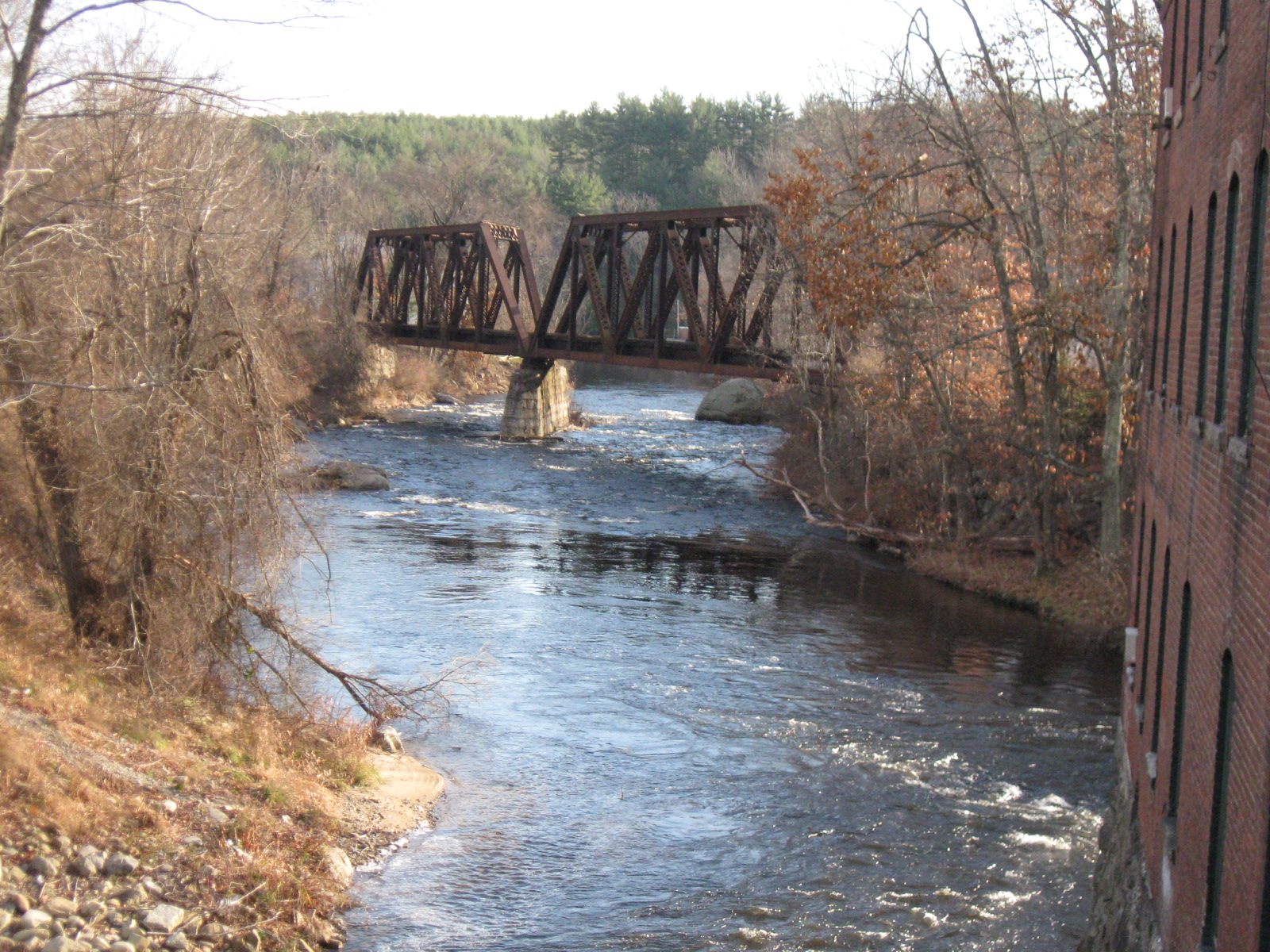
- The Souhegan River in Wilton, NH

- Location within New Hampshire Location within the United States

Location
- Country: United States
- State: New Hampshire
- County: Hillsborough
- Towns: New Ipswich, Greenville, Wilton, Milford, Amherst, Merrimack

Physical characteristics
- Source: Confluence of West Branch and South Branch
  - location: New Ipswich
  - coordinates: 42°43′52″N 71°50′47″W
  - elevation: 927 ft (283 m)
- Mouth: Merrimack River
  - location: Merrimack
  - coordinates: 42°51′41″N 71°29′14″W
  - elevation: 95 ft (29 m)
- Length: 33.8 mi (54.4 km)

Basin features
- Tributaries
  - left: Blood Brook, Stony Brook, Purgatory Brook, Beaver Brook, Baboosic Brook
  - right: Tucker Brook, Great Brook

The Souhegan River is a tributary of the Merrimack River in the northeastern United States. It is 33.8 miles (54.4 km) long, with a drainage area of 171 sq mi (440 km^{2}), and flows north and east through southern New Hampshire to the Merrimack River. The river begins in New Ipswich, New Hampshire, at the junction of the river's South Branch and West Branch. Flowing northeast, it passes through the center of Greenville and descends through a narrow valley to Wilton, where it turns east. The river valley broadens below Wilton, and the river passes through the center of Milford, crosses the southern portion of Amherst, and enters the town of Merrimack. Shortly upstream of the town center, the river passes over Wildcat Falls, then crosses under the Everett Turnpike and U.S. Route 3 to reach the Merrimack River.

The river is used for water supplies, a small amount of hydropower, and recreation. There are 28 threatened or endangered species sharing the watershed with 35,000 people. It is part of the New Hampshire Rivers Management Protection Program.

It was one of two rivers studied by the New Hampshire Department of Environmental Services to reach data and recommendations about allowable "instream flow".

== Etymology ==
The name "Souhegan" comes from the language of the Native American Algonquins, meaning "waiting and watching place". Tribal fishermen set weirs across the rapids, and then waited and watched for fish, including salmon, alewives, sturgeon, and eels.

Souhegan High School, which serves the towns of Amherst and Mont Vernon, is named after the river.

The name of Skowhegan, Maine, comes from the same term.

== See also ==
- List of rivers of New Hampshire
