= Murder of Tristyn Bailey =

2021 child murder in Florida, U.S.

Tristyn Bailey
- Tristyn Bailey in 2021
- Location: St. Johns County, Florida, U.S.
- Date: May 9, 2021; 5 years ago c. 1:50 a.m.
- Attack type: Thrill killing; Child murder; Stabbing
- Weapon: 3.75-inch Buck 110 folding knife
- Victims: Tristyn Tyne Bailey, aged 13
- Perpetrator: Aiden Fucci
- Motive: Thrill
- Verdict: Pleaded guilty
- Convictions: First-degree murder
- Sentence: Life imprisonment with the eligibility for a sentence review after 25 years
- Judge: R. Lee Smith

In the early morning hours of May 9, 2021, Tristyn Tyne Bailey (January 18, 2008 – May 9, 2021), a 13-year-old middle schooler and cheerleader, was murdered by Aiden Fucci (born November 6, 2006), a 14-year-old schoolmate, in St. Johns, Florida, United States. Bailey was reported missing by her family that morning; her body was found later that day by a resident in a wooded area near St. Johns. Her body had 114 stab wounds.

A residential security camera recorded Bailey walking around at 1:45 am with Fucci. A later recording showed Fucci running alone in the opposite direction with his shoes in hand. On the evening of May 9, investigators searched Fucci's house, where bloody clothes were found in his room and in the bathroom sink. A knife with a fragment of the tip missing was found in a pond near Bailey's body and the missing knife-tip was later found during an autopsy embedded in the victim's scalp. Fucci was initially arraigned on the charge of second degree murder, which was changed to first degree premeditated murder on May 27. He maintained his innocence at the time.

On February 6, 2023, just before jury selection was about to begin, Fucci pled guilty to first degree murder. On March 24, 2023, Fucci, then 16 years old, was sentenced to life in prison. He is currently serving his sentence at Cross City Correctional Institution.

== Background ==
Tristyn Tyne Bailey was born in Singapore on January 18, 2008, to American expatriate parents Forrest and Stacy Bailey. She was the youngest of five children. Bailey spent her first four years in Singapore.

Family and friends describe her as "an energetic young girl who always stood up for her friends". Her mother said: "She was just a powerful child that was able to give a lot to so many." Tristyn grew up and lived in St. Johns County, Florida. She was in seventh grade at Patriot Oaks Academy, where she stood out as a popular student and cheerleader.

== Murder ==
=== Disappearance ===
At 9:00 a.m. on May 9, 2021, the Bailey family was preparing to celebrate Mother's Day. Bailey's elder brother, Teegan, went to her room to call her downstairs, and discovered that Tristyn was missing. After a short search of the immediate surrounding area, her mother, Stacy, called 911 to report her daughter missing.

Early that morning, according to police reports, Doffis Absher, a friend of Fucci, said that Fucci had asked him for Bailey's phone number. Fucci called Bailey and convinced her to leave home to go see a friend. At 1:16 a.m., a residential surveillance camera recorded two people walking east on Saddlestone Drive, confirmed to be Fucci and Bailey. At 1:52 a.m., the camera recorded a subject running towards the west, carrying a pair of white shoes.

=== Investigation ===
Deputies Robert Maloney and Liam Stack interviewed Absher later that afternoon. Absher said that Fucci and Bailey had been at his house and left together. Fucci confirmed being with Bailey at Absher's home and stated that they left around 1:10 am. Fucci initially claimed to have walked with Bailey along North Durbin Parkway until she turned onto Cloisterbane Drive to go home. Fucci stated that he walked around for some time and then arrived home at approximately 3:30 am. Noting that the distance between Absher and Fucci's home is a roughly thirty minute walk, investigators pressed for details. At this point, Fucci changed his story, stating that he and Bailey got into an altercation after she attempted to touch his private parts. He claimed to have pushed her away, which caused her to fall and hit her head.

After the interrogation, while in the back seat of a patrol car, Fucci took images and videos, publishing the imagery on the social media app Snapchat. In one picture, Fucci captioned an image "Hey guys has inybody [sic] seen Tristyn lately". In a video, he said: "We're having fun, in a fucking cop car, Tristyn if you walk out the damn-” before the video cuts out.

=== Discovery of body ===
Around 6:00 p.m. on May 9, a resident was walking through a wooded area at the end of Saddlestone Drive, south of Jacksonville. Upon reaching a retention pond, he found the body of a girl. Around 8:00 p.m., it was confirmed that the girl was Tristyn Bailey. She had received 114 stab wounds, 49 of which were defensive. Her body was found with the word "karma" written on the inside of her left ankle, and a smiley face drawn on her right ankle, but it is not known who wrote it.

A Buck knife with a missing tip found in the pond near her body matched a fragment lodged in Bailey's scalp.

=== Arrest ===
Around midnight May 10, police went to Fucci's residence after having obtained a search warrant. In his room, they found a sheath that matched the knife found near Bailey's body and bloody clothing. Around 3:00 a.m., Fucci was booked for second-degree murder, but this was eventually changed to first-degree murder on May 25, after further examination of evidence and witness accounts.

On the morning of May 10, during a press conference, St. Johns County Sheriff Robert Hardwick announced the arrest of Fucci as a suspect, and claimed that the medical examiners had established that Bailey's death was caused by "sharp force trauma by stabbing". He stated that the second-degree murder charge could be upgraded to first-degree murder. Of the crime itself, Hardwick said: "This is no accident. This is a cold-blooded murder."

== Legal proceedings ==
=== Crystal Smith ===
Fucci's mother, Crystal Smith, was arrested on June 4 for tampering with evidence after security camera footage inside her home captured her washing blood off Fucci's jeans on the evening of May 9. In May 2023, Smith pleaded "no contest" and was sentenced to 30 days in jail.

=== Aiden Fucci ===
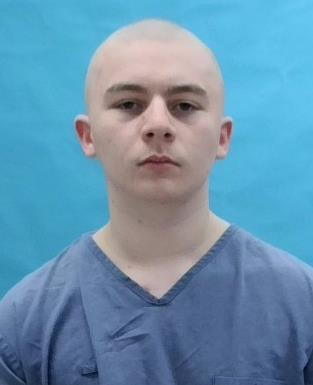
Aiden Fucci

Following his arrest on May 10, Fucci was transported to the Volusia Regional Juvenile Detention Center in Volusia County. Fucci made his first court appearance via Zoom on the morning of May 11 for a preliminary hearing, which was attended by both his parents and his attorney, Andrew Snober. He was charged with second-degree murder and subsequently ordered to remain in the detention center for at least 21 days until the prosecutors decided whether or not to charge him as an adult. On May 17, Snober filed a motion to withdraw from the case completely, prompting the court to appoint Fucci a public defender.

On May 25, Fucci was formally charged with first-degree murder after further review of evidence and witness accounts. During a press conference on May 27, State Attorney RJ Larizza stated that Fucci told his friends he was going to kill someone by "taking them to the woods and stabbing them". Larizza also said Fucci told his friends to "expect [the murder] to happen within the month", and that "killing was imminent". Larizza also said Bailey had been stabbed 114 times, with 49 of those stab wounds being "defensive in nature," indicating that Bailey had tried to fight her killer off. On May 28, Fucci was denied bond during a virtual bond hearing, and was subsequently transferred to Duval County Jail.

On June 3, Fucci pleaded "not guilty" to first-degree murder. A pre-trial hearing was set for July 28 but was eventually pushed back to September 1, after Fucci waived his right to a speedy trial and his defense team asked for a continuance. During the September 1 hearing, which Fucci attended via Zoom due to COVID-19 restrictions, he began acting erratically; rocking back-and-forth in his chair, mumbling about "demons taking my soul away" and repeatedly asking: "Where am I? What's going on?" The hearing was eventually cut short due to technical difficulties and postponed to October 28. In February 2022, it was announced that Fucci's trial would begin in November 2022. In August 2022, the trial was ultimately pushed back to February 2023, after Fucci's court-appointed attorney, Rosemarie Peoples, filed a motion to push back the trial so she could have more time talking to witnesses and to work on another case she was assigned to. On November 28, Peoples requested a change of venue for the trial, stating Fucci had been held in solitary confinement for over 400 days since his arrival at Duval County Jail in May 2021, citing "psychological torture". Her motion was denied by Judge R. Lee Smith. On December 2, Judge Smith set the date of February 6, 2023 for Fucci's trial. On February 1, 2023, Peoples filed another motion to push the trial back, which Judge Smith rejected.

In late January 2023, an "incident report" released by Jacksonville Sheriff's Office showed Fucci had a lengthy history of disciplinary issues during his time at Duval County Jail, including, extorting inmates for their commissary items by "using fear", threatening to kill inmates and correctional officers, fighting an inmate in December 2021 and at one point boasting about his crime. The report also stated that Fucci was restrained using pepper spray at least twice and had to be put in a restraint chair once. During a report from October 2022, it said that Fucci had been "relentless" in making threats against two inmates, one claimed Fucci said he was going to "stab them up and take pictures of it." On another occasion, when officers entered his cell to reclaim misappropriated commissary items, he started banging on his cell door in a "loud vicious manner" and shouted threats of murder towards correctional officers concerning their families.

Shortly before jury selection was set to begin, on February 6, 2023, Fucci pleaded guilty to first-degree murder and subsequently admitted to killing Bailey. During the hearing, Fucci was allowed to make a statement, during which he apologized to Bailey's family and his own family. As a result, a 40-year prison term was the minimum sentence for which Fucci was eligible, while life in prison was the maximum. Fucci was ineligible for the death penalty as he was a juvenile when he committed the crime. Fucci also wrote a letter apologizing for the pain he caused Bailey's family and friends. Judge Smith subsequently set the date of March 24 for Fucci's sentencing.

==== Sentencing ====
On the first day of the sentencing phase, clinical psychologist Dr. Greg Prichard testified that Fucci's behavior after the murder was "callous" and that he hasn't shown he could be rehabilitated. He also pointed to the brutality of the crime: "[Fucci] is not demonstrating he can get better. You know, inflicting 114 wounds, it takes a long time. It doesn’t speak to impetuosity to take that long. There is thought going on in his head as this is playing out." In turn, the defense called Dr. Stephen Bloomfield, who disputed Prichard's testimony, claiming adolescent brains weren't fully developed and that he believed Fucci had expressed remorse for the crime. Additionally, Bloomfield claimed there was insufficient evidence that the murder was premeditated.

During the impact statements of the sentencing phase, which began on March 21, Bailey's family members, friends and members of her cheerleading team gave emotional testimonies. Bailey's mother, Stacy, pleaded with Judge Smith during her testimony, saying: "Please do not for one second think [Fucci] could be rehabilitated at any point. He is beyond saving." She also spoke directly to Fucci, stating: "Aiden Fucci, you have destroyed me, you have destroyed my family." Bailey's second oldest sister, Alexis, dropped 114 aqua stone hearts into a glass jar one by one to represent the stab wounds her sister endured. The jar stayed there for each family member (except Bailey's older sister Sophia, who was not present in the sentencing) while they read their statements. Each concluded by adding a white stone to represent something related to Bailey's death. Employees at Patriot Oaks Academy (the school that both Fucci and Bailey attended), police officers involved in the case, and Fucci's grandmother were also among those who testified. During her testimony, Fucci's grandmother pleaded with the judge to not give him the maximum sentence: "Please don't take him out of our lives forever, I know there is some good in Aiden."

In the closing arguments, Peoples cited Fucci's ADHD diagnosis, the emotional neglect he had suffered as a child, the history of mental illness in his family and his physically abusive step-father in her recommendation of the minimum 40-year sentence. State Attorney Jennifer Dunton spoke of Fucci's impetuous behaviour, the level of premeditation of the murder, his disciplinary problems at school and his verbalization of the crime beforehand, including telling his girlfriend that he was going to kill someone soon. Dunton also cited Dr. Prichard's testimony, during which he claimed Fucci understood right from wrong and was aware of the consequences of the crime. She also said the crime was "extremely unique and extremely violent," recommending the maximum sentence of life in prison.

Fucci was ultimately given the maximum sentence of life in prison on March 24, 2023, at age 16. After 25 years of incarceration, he'll be entitled to apply for a case review hearing. During the sentencing, Judge R. Lee Smith called this the most "difficult and shocking case" over which he had presided, adding:

"What is also very troubling is that this crime had no motive. This was not done out of greed; it was not done in retaliation, retribution, or revenge; it was not a crime of passion; it was not a crime that was committed because he felt rejected by her, it was not done in a fit of uncontrollable anger. There was no reason. There was no purpose. It was done for no other reason than to satisfy this defendant's internal desire to feel what it was like to kill someone."

== Tristyn Bailey Memorial Foundation ==
Bailey's family formed the Tristyn Bailey Memorial Foundation, which helped enact a law in the state of Florida that restricts the disclosure of crime scene photographs of any minor who has been murdered in the state.

== See also ==
- Crime in Florida
- List of solved missing person cases (2020s)
