= Amherst Village Historic District =

Historic district in New Hampshire, United States

- U.S. National Register of Historic Places
- U.S. Historic district
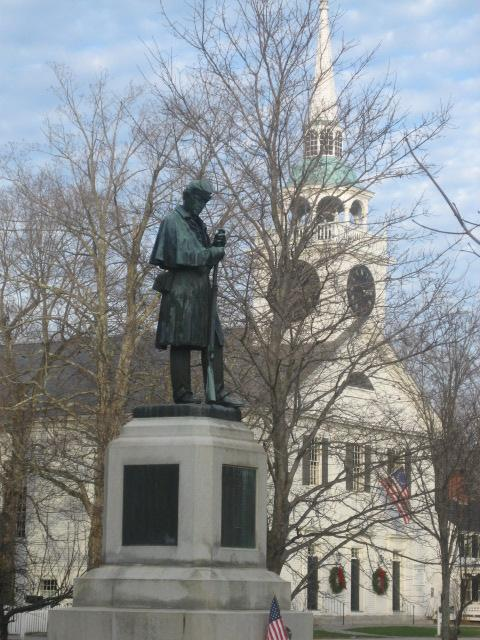

- Location within New Hampshire Location within the United States
- Interactive map showing the location of Amherst Village Historic District
- Location: NH 122, Amherst, New Hampshire
- Coordinates: 42°51′46″N 71°37′37″W
- Area: 160 acres (65 ha)
- Architect: Multiple
- Architectural style: Greek Revival, Federal, Cape
- NRHP reference No.: 82001679
- Added to NRHP: August 18, 1982

The Amherst Village Historic District encompasses the historic village center of Amherst, New Hampshire. Centered on the town's common, which was established about 1755, Amherst Village is one of the best examples of a late-18th to early-19th century New England village center. It is roughly bounded on the north by Foundry Street and on the south by Amherst Street, although it extends along some roads beyond both. The western boundary is roughly Davis Lane, the eastern is Mack Hill Road, Old Manchester Road, and Court House Road. The district includes the Congregational Church, built c. 1771-74, and is predominantly residential, with a large number of Georgian, Federal, and Greek Revival houses. Other notable non-residential buildings include the Farmer's Bank, a Federal-style brick building built in 1806, and the Amherst Brick School, a brick Greek Revival structure that has served as the School Administrative Unit 39 offices since 1997.

Amherst was surveyed in 1735, and settled by veterans of King Philip's War from Massachusetts. Its first colonial meeting house was built in 1749 on a hill northeast of the village common, and was moved to the common after the town was incorporated in 1760. Several houses, including one originally used as a tavern, that were built in its immediate area in 1750 are still standing. Amherst was the first shire town of Hillsborough County (organized 1769), and was located roughly midway between Boston, Massachusetts and Lake Champlain, and it flourished economically. The present town hall was built in 1825 as the county's third courthouse. The town entered a decline when the people began leaving for more fertile lands in the American Midwest, and when the town was bypassed by significant industrialization. In 1862, the county functions were moved to the growing industrial centers of Nashua and Manchester.

The district was listed on the National Register of Historic Places in 1982. The Hildreth-Jones Tavern, located at 18 Jones Road, was added to the New Hampshire State Register of Historic Places on January 26, 2004.

== See also ==
- National Register of Historic Places listings in Hillsborough County, New Hampshire
