= Souhegan High School =

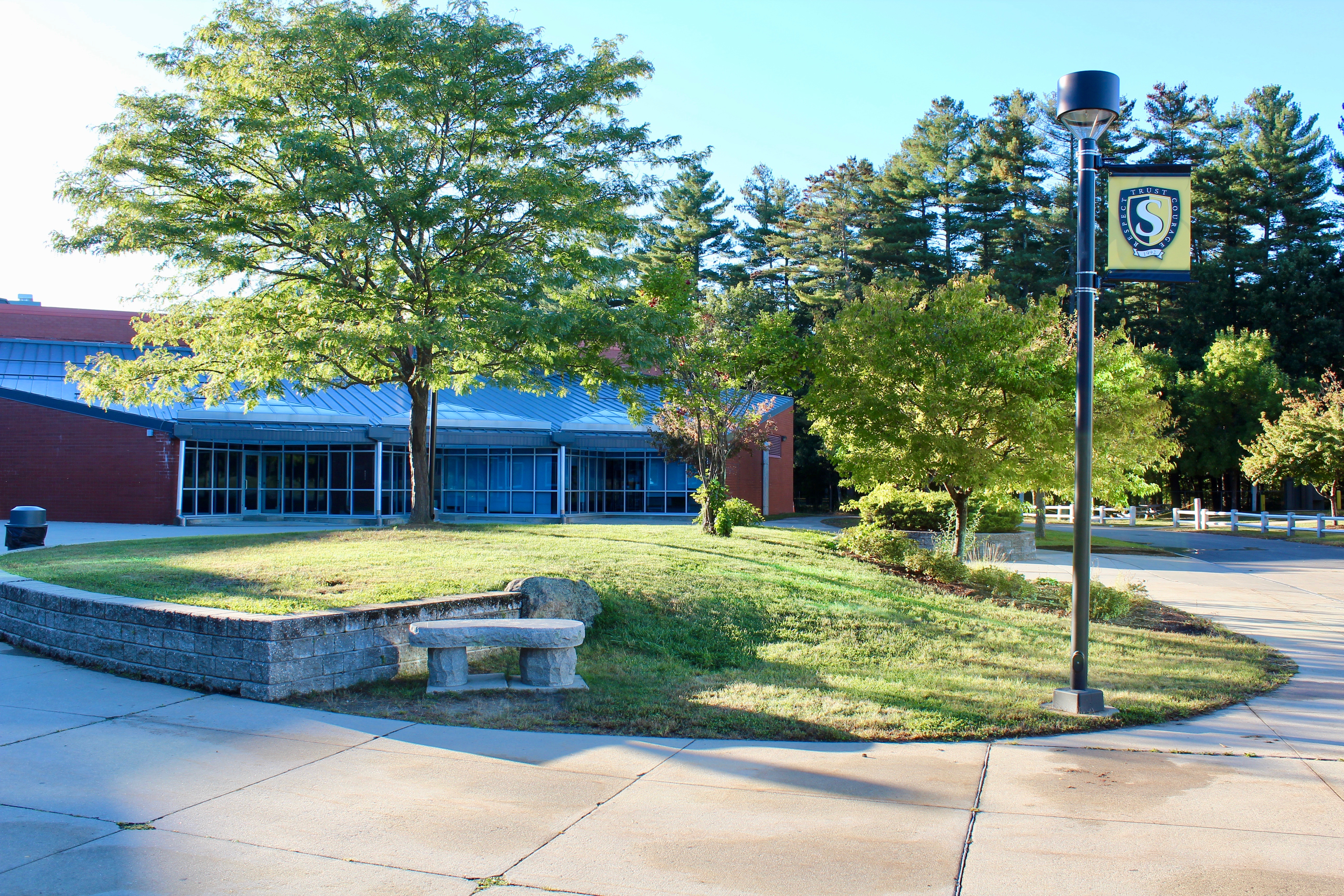
- Amherst, New Hampshire; United States

Information
- Type: Public
- Motto: Respect, Trust, Courage
- Opened: 1992 (Fall, First Class Year 1993)
- Principal: Dana Curran
- Teaching staff: 67.00 (on an FTE basis)
- Enrollment: 691 (2023-2024)
- Student to teacher ratio: 10.31
- Campus: Exurb (exurban)
- Colors: Black and gold
- Mascot: Sabers
- Website: shs.sau39.org

Souhegan Cooperative High School (/saʊˈhiːɡən/) is a Coalition of Essential Schools high school located in Amherst, New Hampshire, in the United States. Students from Amherst and Mont Vernon attend Souhegan for 9th through 12th grades. There are about 750 students. The school was founded based on the work of Theodore R. Sizer, a former dean of the Harvard Graduate School of Education, a notable American education reform leader, and the father of the Essential Schools movement. Notably, Souhegan's progressive reputation has been chronicled in the book Standards of Mind and Heart: Creating the Good High School by Tony Wagner, Peggy Silvia, and Dr. Robert A. Mackin (Teachers College Press, 2002). Based on this history, the school was founded with the mission "Souhegan High School aspires to be a community of learners born of respect, trust, and courage." The school name is derived from its proximity to the Souhegan River, which adjoins the school property. The word Souhegan comes from the Algonquin language, meaning "waiting and watching place".

== History ==
=== Authorized Regional Enrollment Area ===
The town of Amherst had long sought to apply economies of scale through a cooperative high school in partnership with adjoining towns and made several overtures in the late 1950s and early 1960s to neighboring Milford and other towns, but found no support. A proposal for a cooperative district with Bedford came to a vote in 1961, passing overwhelmingly in Amherst, but being defeated in Bedford. In November 1964, Amherst and Milford entered into the state's first Authorized Regional Enrollment Area (or "AREA") agreement, a long-term tuition agreement under which Milford would retain ownership and absolute control of the high school and Amherst would pay tuition to Milford based upon Milford's per-pupil costs of the preceding year, plus a share of the school's capital debt, but had no voice in the school's governance; the agreement was irrevocable while the debt was carried. Mont Vernon joined the AREA agreement and additionally sent its middle school students to Milford. Amherst was dissatisfied with the high school and its lack of voice, and "Milford felt that Amherst had educational ideas too rich for Milford's blood." The school boards of Amherst and Milford tentatively planned in 1976 not to renew the AREA agreement in ten years when the high school's capital debt was anticipated to be paid off. The Amherst School District appointed a committee to examine the alternatives, including building a high school of its own. The committee commissioned a study by an architectural and educational planning firm, published in 1982.

Beginning in 1984, Amherst and Mont Vernon were each permitted to send one non-voting delegate to the Milford School Board, as was the high school's student body. Despite the tentative plan from nine years earlier for the towns' school districts to go their separate ways, negotiations for a prospective new AREA agreement began in 1985 with Amherst and Mont Vernon seeking significant improvements to the high school. The debt and the AREA agreement expired as expected at the end of the 1985–1986 academic year, while negotiations continued; its tuition terms continued under annual tuition agreements in the interim.

=== Cooperative High School Era ===
A regional school district was proposed and put before the voters of all three towns in 1988. The proposal was defeated at the Milford School District's special deliberative session. Days later, the Amherst School District held its special deliberative session, where Amherst voters established the Souhegan Cooperative School District. Mont Vernon followed suit within the week.

The school opened in 1992, on property previously owned by the Amherst School District, adjoining the Amherst Middle School and sharing some outdoor facilities. The school added a second building in 2003, called the Annex.

The school is part of the SAU-39 school district, which includes the middle and elementary schools in Amherst and Mont Vernon.

The current principal of the high school is Dana Curran.

== Recognition ==
In June 2009 Souhegan was listed #15 in "The Top of the Class", a ranking of the top 1,564 public high schools in the United States (approximately the top 6%) by Newsweek.

In April 2016, officials from the U.S. Department of Education toured the school and met with students and staff to discuss Souhegan's involvement with P.A.C.E. (Performance Assessment of Competency Education), Competency Based Education and Deeper Learning initiatives.

Souhegan consistently ranks as one of the best public high schools in New Hampshire:

- #7 Overall in New Hampshire, U.S. News & World Report (2018).
- #4 Overall in New Hampshire, Niche (2017).
- #8 Overall in New Hampshire, SchoolDigger (2017).
- #9 College Readiness in New Hampshire, U.S. News & World Report (2017).
- Top Public High School for Student Athletes in New Hampshire, Niche (2017).

== Academics ==
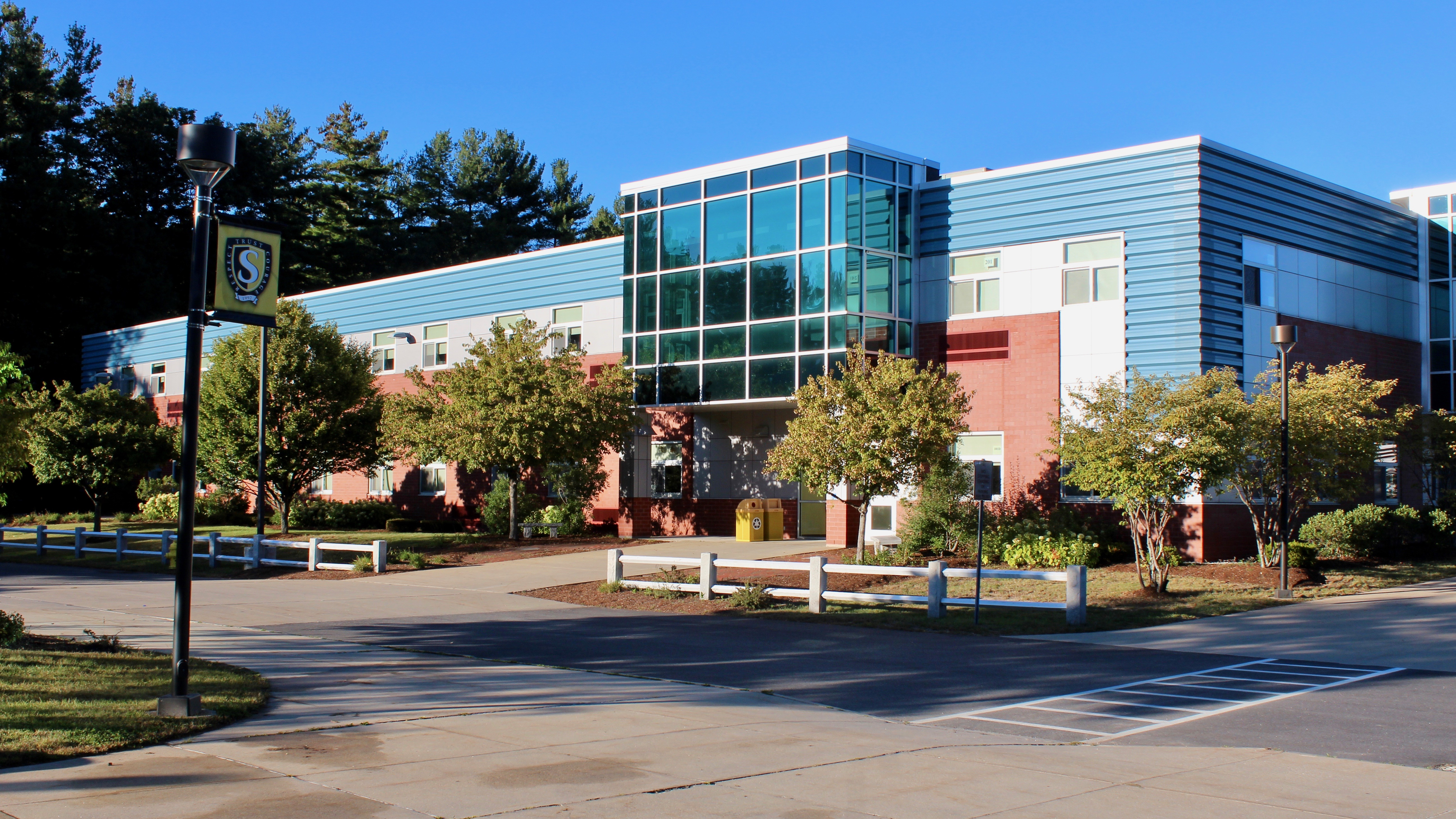
The Annex

Unique programs

The four traditional grade levels at Souhegan are split into two. Division One consists of the Freshman and Sophomore years. Division Two consists of Junior and Senior years. The following project-based programs are core academic requirements:

=== Division I Exhibition ===
The Division I Exhibition is designed to help students recognize and acknowledge their progress in the Souhegan High School Academic Learner Expectations and the Mission Statement. It is a multipart process for sophomore students moving into their junior year. The first part of the process is for a student to complete a portfolio of 9th and 10th grade work reflecting on this work through the lens of the learner expectations. Next, using the information in the portfolio, students write a reaction to their entire Division I (9th and 10th grade) experience. The final part of the process is the exhibition, students participate in the form of a 45-minute "roundtable" where the student presents his/her portfolio and written reaction in the company of his/her advisor, parents, peers, and a second Souhegan staff member. The Division I Exhibition is a graduation requirement. Students who do not complete the Division I Exhibition will work with their advisor and counselor to develop a plan for meeting this requirement.

==== Junior Learning Project ====
The Junior Learning Project, or JLP, a graduation requirement, is a research writing process that culminates with two comprehensive research papers written during fall/winter and spring junior year. As part of the World Studies curriculum, students gain research and writing skills that aid them in the completion of these papers. Of the two papers, the former will be completed as a part of the World Studies: English curriculum, while the latter is completed as a part of the World Studies: Social Studies curriculum. In their final products, students exhibit their competence in the Academic Learner Expectations. The Junior Research Project is a graduation requirement.

== Governance ==
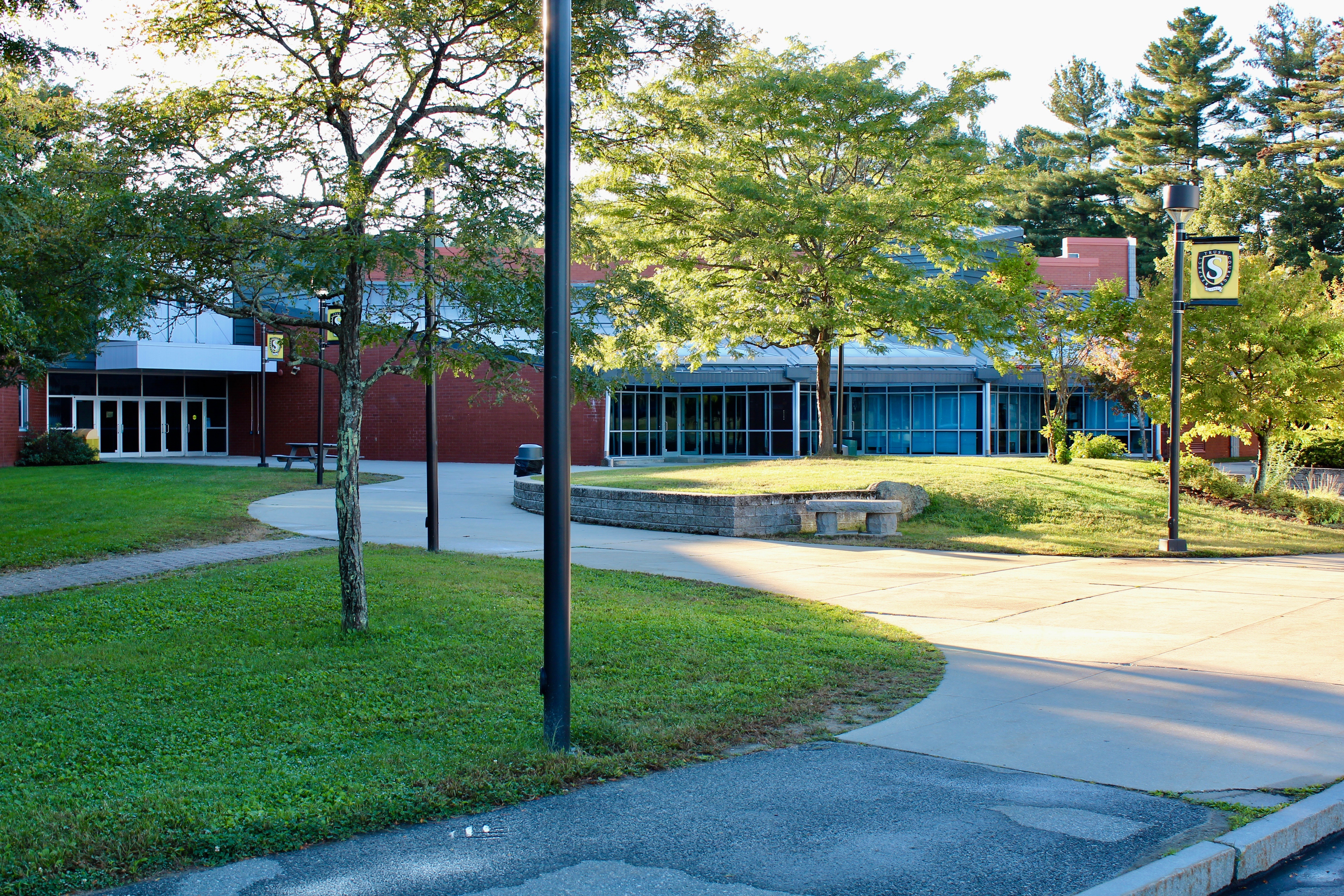
Souhegan Rear East Entrance

Governance at Souhegan is unique among other public high schools. Given that inclusion and student voice are critical cultural components at the school, governance includes not only the Administration and the Souhegan Cooperative School Board, but also a Community Council. Community Council was founded in 1992 during Souhegan's first year of service. Its task is to create and modify school procedures as a representative body of forty-seven members. Council is purposefully diverse and purposefully student-led. The representatives discuss and vote on various proposals concerning student life, school initiatives, disciplinary procedure, grading procedure, and any other matter of importance to the school community.

=== Community Review Board ===
The Community Review Board is a body of community members that was created to ensure the fairness of disciplinary actions by the school's administration. The Community Review Board only has authority in cases that do not involve outside agencies, such as the police. The Community Review Board consists of eleven members, including:

- One student elected from each grade
- One student selected by random, voluntary lottery
- Two elected faculty
- One elected Community Council member

The Community Review Board has the authority to:

- Decide whether or not to hear a case
- Uphold the administration's decision
- Change the punishment set by the administration
- Nullify the administration's decision

In cases where the police department is involved, a student can appeal to the principal, superintendent, and then the school board. In cases where the school chooses not to pursue legal action, a student may still appeal to the CRB.

=== Souhegan Cooperative School Board ===
The Souhegan Cooperative School Board is a seven-member board that consists of five elected members serving Amherst, New Hampshire and two elected members serving Mont Vernon, New Hampshire. Different seats have terms of either two or three years, depending on the seat. Elections are held every year in March.

== Athletics and clubs ==
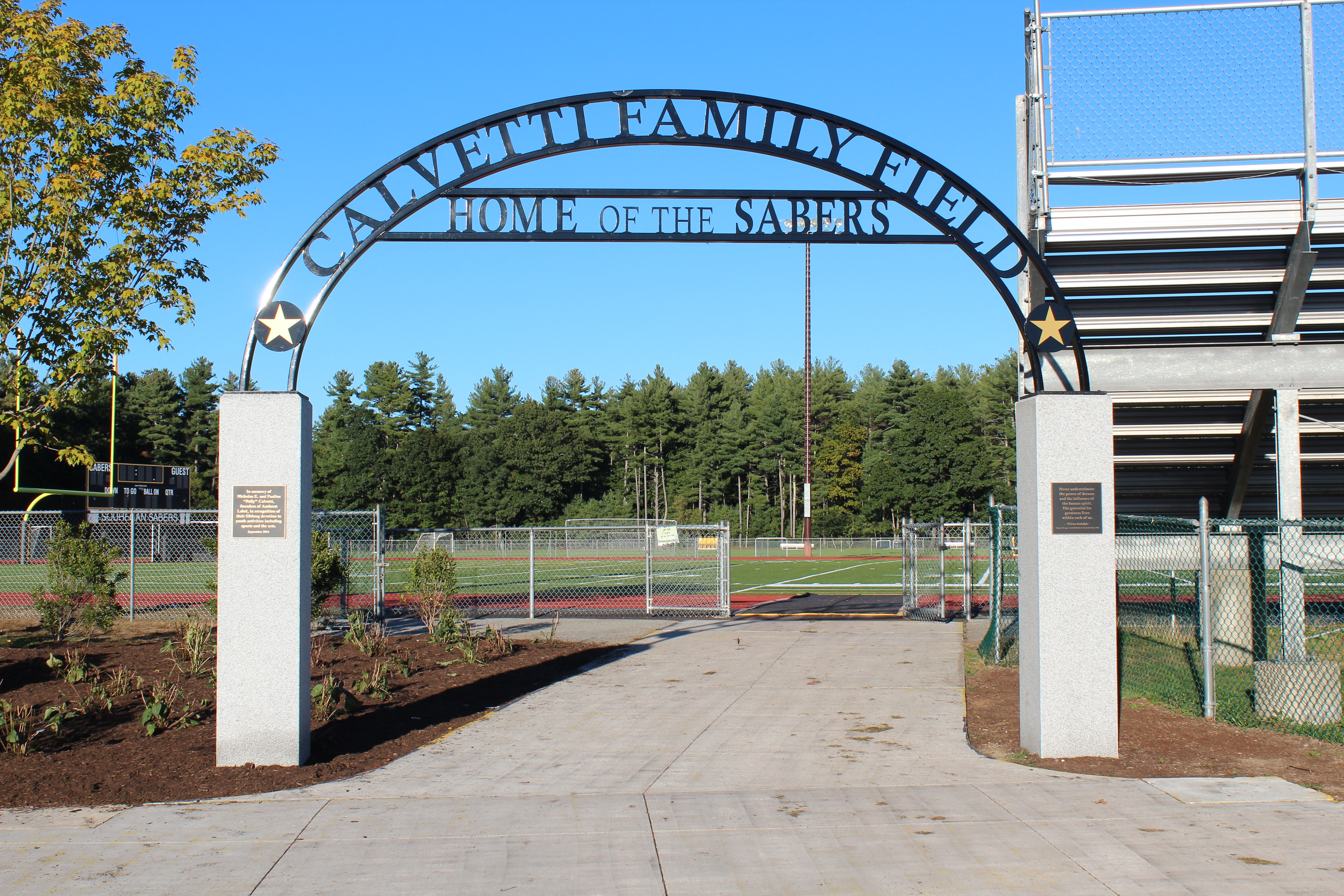
Calvetti Family Field entrance

=== Athletics ===
The Souhegan Sabers compete across several divisions in the New Hampshire Interscholastic Athletic Association. The Sabers field 27 different girls, boys, and co-ed athletic teams.

- The girls' soccer team set a state record by winning 9 straight Class I championships between 1992 and 2000.
- In 2003, the school set a state record with eight teams winning state championships. The softball, boys' baseball, boys' basketball, boys' track, boys' and tennis the girls' lacrosse teams all won state championships.
- The varsity ice hockey team won the NHIAA DIII state championships in 2006, 2007, 2008, and 2014.
- The varsity football team won the NHIAA DIII state championships in 2004, 2008, 2009, and 2010, and the NHIAA DII state championship in 2020 and 2024.
- In 2012, the boys' varsity indoor track, outdoor track, and cross country teams won DII state championship titles.
- In 2016, the girls' varsity cross country team was the first in school history to win the DII championship title. They also went on to win the New Hampshire Meet of Champions and earn runner-up honors at the New England Championships. The varsity girls team also placed 2nd as the Sabers Running Club at the non-NHIAA-sanctioned Nike Northeast qualifier in Wappinger Falls, NY, and became only the third team from New Hampshire to qualify to compete at Nike Cross Nationals (formerly Nike Team Nationals).
- In 2017, the girls' varsity indoor track and field team won the DII state championship.
- In 2017, the girls' varsity lacrosse team won the DI state championship.
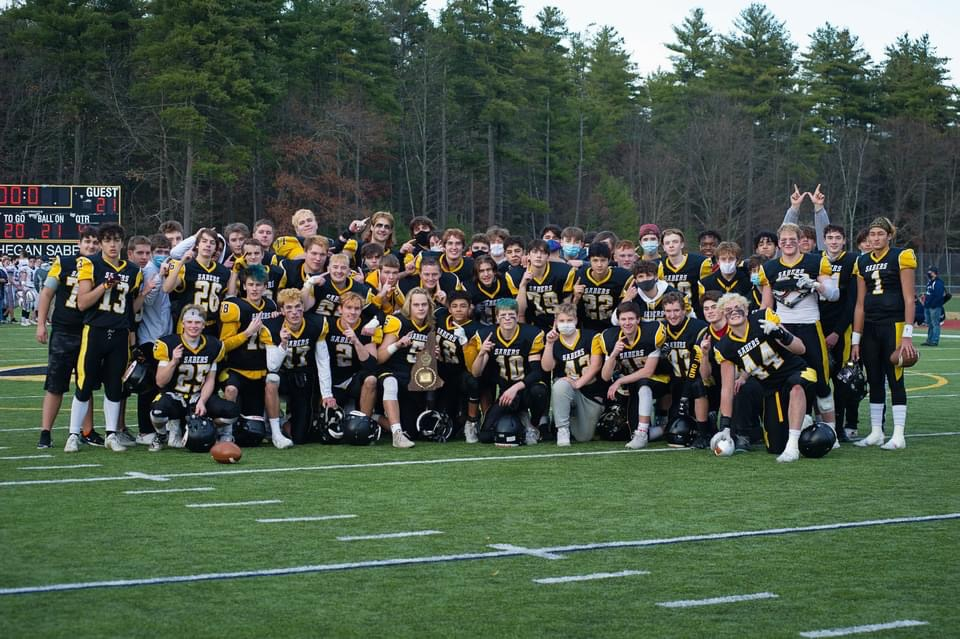
  Souhegan Saber Football Champions: 2004, 2008, 2009, 2010, 2020, 2024

== Notable alumni and staff ==
- Courtney Banghart (class of 1996), head women's basketball coach at Princeton University
- Tony Labranche (class of 2020), Youngest New Hampshire State Representative in state history.
- Ryan M. Pitts (class of 2003), Medal of Honor recipient
- Alex Preston, finalist on American Idol (season 13)

== Campus ==
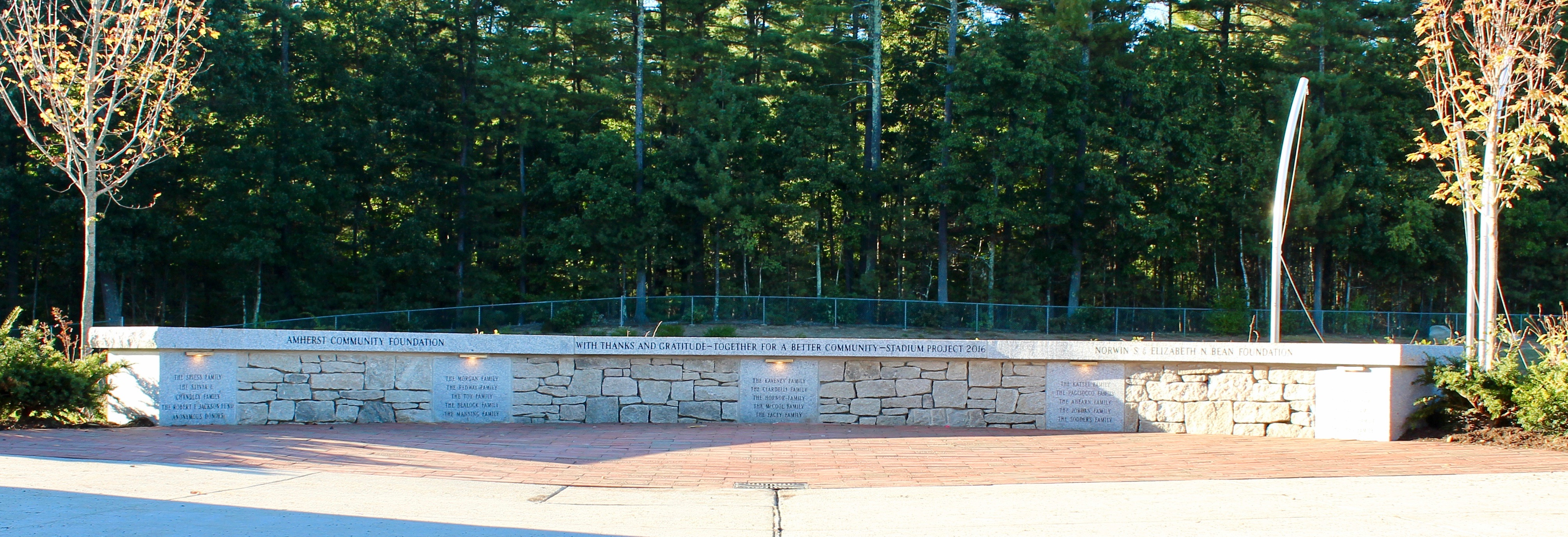
Calvetti Field seating area

- Main Building
- Annex
- Calvetti Field & Athletic Complex
- Theater
- Music Wing
