= Mont Vernon, New Hampshire =

- Town
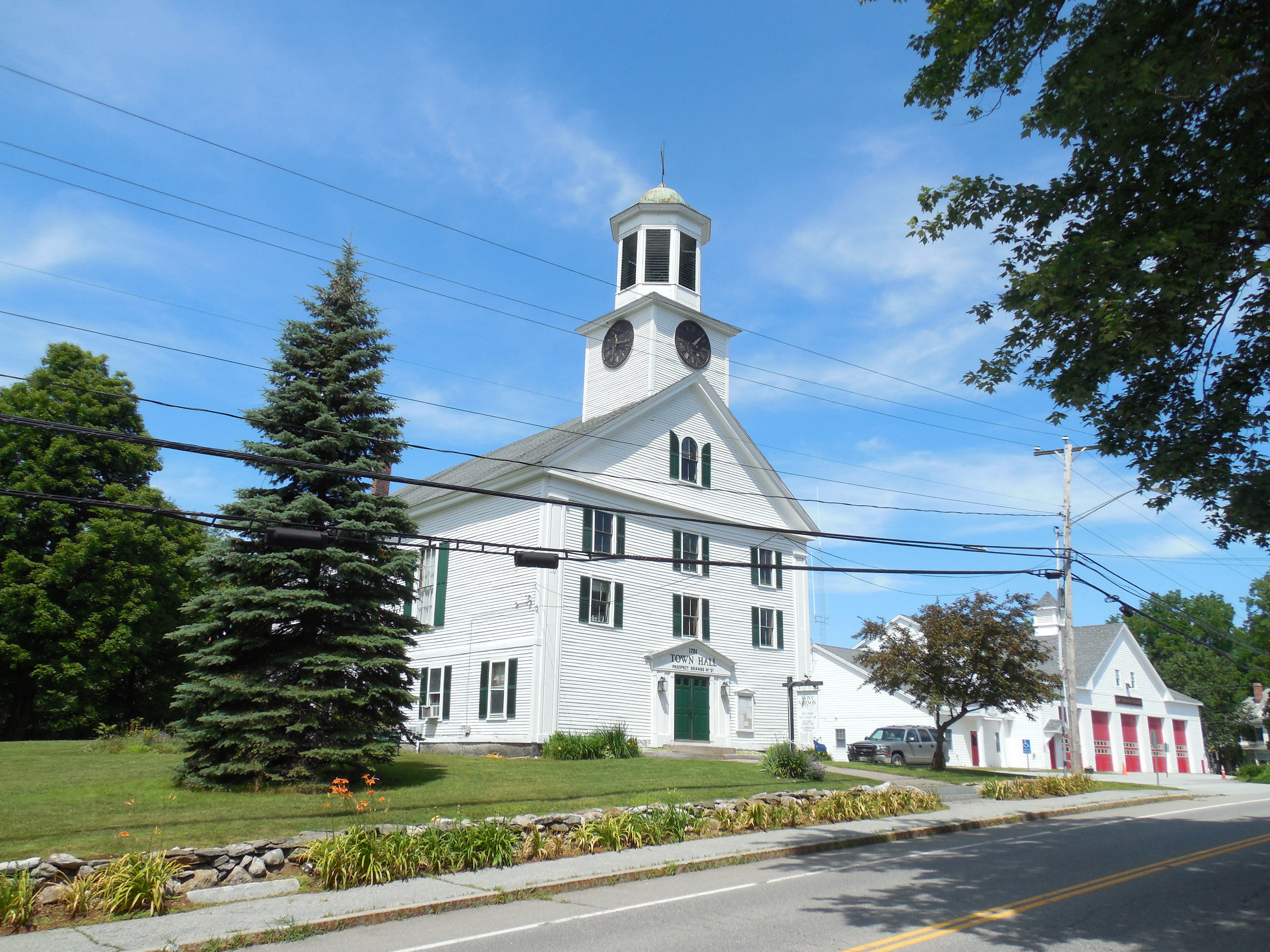
- Town hall

- Seal

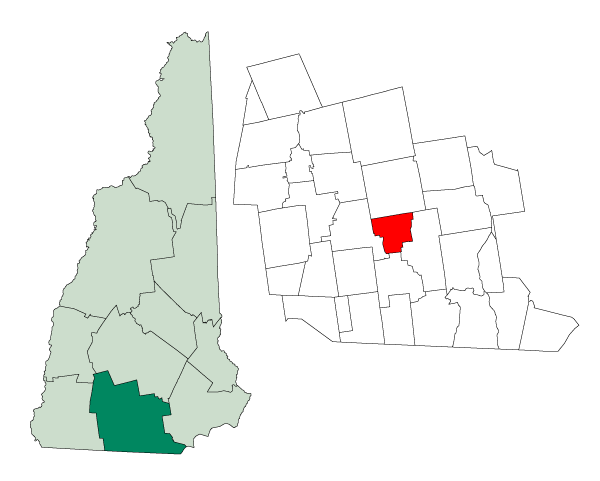
- Location in Hillsborough County, New Hampshire
- Coordinates: 42°53′09″N 71°41′05″W
- Country: United States
- State: New Hampshire
- County: Hillsborough
- Incorporated: 1803

Area
  - Total: 16.9 sq mi (43.8 km^{2})
  - Land: 16.8 sq mi (43.6 km^{2})
  - Water: 0.077 sq mi (0.2 km^{2}) 0.49%
- Elevation: 804 ft (245 m)

Population (2020)
  - Total: 2,584
  - Density: 154/sq mi (59.3/km^{2})
- Time zone: UTC-5 (Eastern)
  - Summer (DST): UTC-4 (Eastern)
- ZIP code: 03057
- Area code: 603
- FIPS code: 33-49140
- GNIS feature ID: 873670
- Website: www.montvernonnh.us

Mont Vernon is a town in Hillsborough County, New Hampshire, United States. The population was 2,584 at the 2020 census, up from 2,409 at the 2010 census.

== Spelling ==
It is not clear why the name of the community is spelled differently from the many other towns in the United States named after Mount Vernon, the home of George Washington. It was spelled without a "u" from the start, written that way in the town charter of 1803. Local hotel owner George Kittredge convinced the U.S. Post Office to add the "u" in the late 1800s, apparently in hopes of boosting business, but the spelling was reverted after his death.

== History ==
Mont Vernon broke away from neighboring Amherst in 1803, following a dispute over the town parish. It later added a small portion of neighboring Lyndeborough.

Mont Vernon's general history follows that of many towns in this region. Originally settled for agriculture, its farms were hard hit after the Civil War when railroads opened up better farming land in the Midwest. The town's population peaked in 1870 and began to decline.

By the late 1890s, it had become a tourist town, drawing summer visitors from points south, notably Boston, who escaped the heat in Mont Vernon's hills. At one point, it had five large summer hotels, including the Grand Hotel located on top of Grand Hill, and a number of boarding houses. The hotel business began to wither with the development of the automobile, which allowed tourists to reach places like the White Mountains of New Hampshire, and it was killed by the Great Depression. The town's population bottomed out at barely 300 in 1930 and by World War II all the hotels were demolished or destroyed by fire, as happened to the Grand Hotel.

Since the war, Mont Vernon has slowly become a suburban community. This was significantly accelerated in 1962–1963 when engineers and technicians employed at Sanders Associates in Nashua found homes in Mont Vernon attractive. It wasn't until the 1970 census that the town's official population passed mid-19th century highs.

Agriculture, including a 1940s and 1950s boom in chicken and egg farming, has all but disappeared. As of 2024, the town has one dairy farm. The town has one general store that except for a two-year period from 2010 to 2012 has operated for more than 120 years in the same location.

Mont Vernon made national news in March 2012 due to debate during the annual town meeting over whether to rename a small fishing hole called Jew Pond. The town eventually renamed it Carleton Pond, after the family which donated the surrounding property to the town.

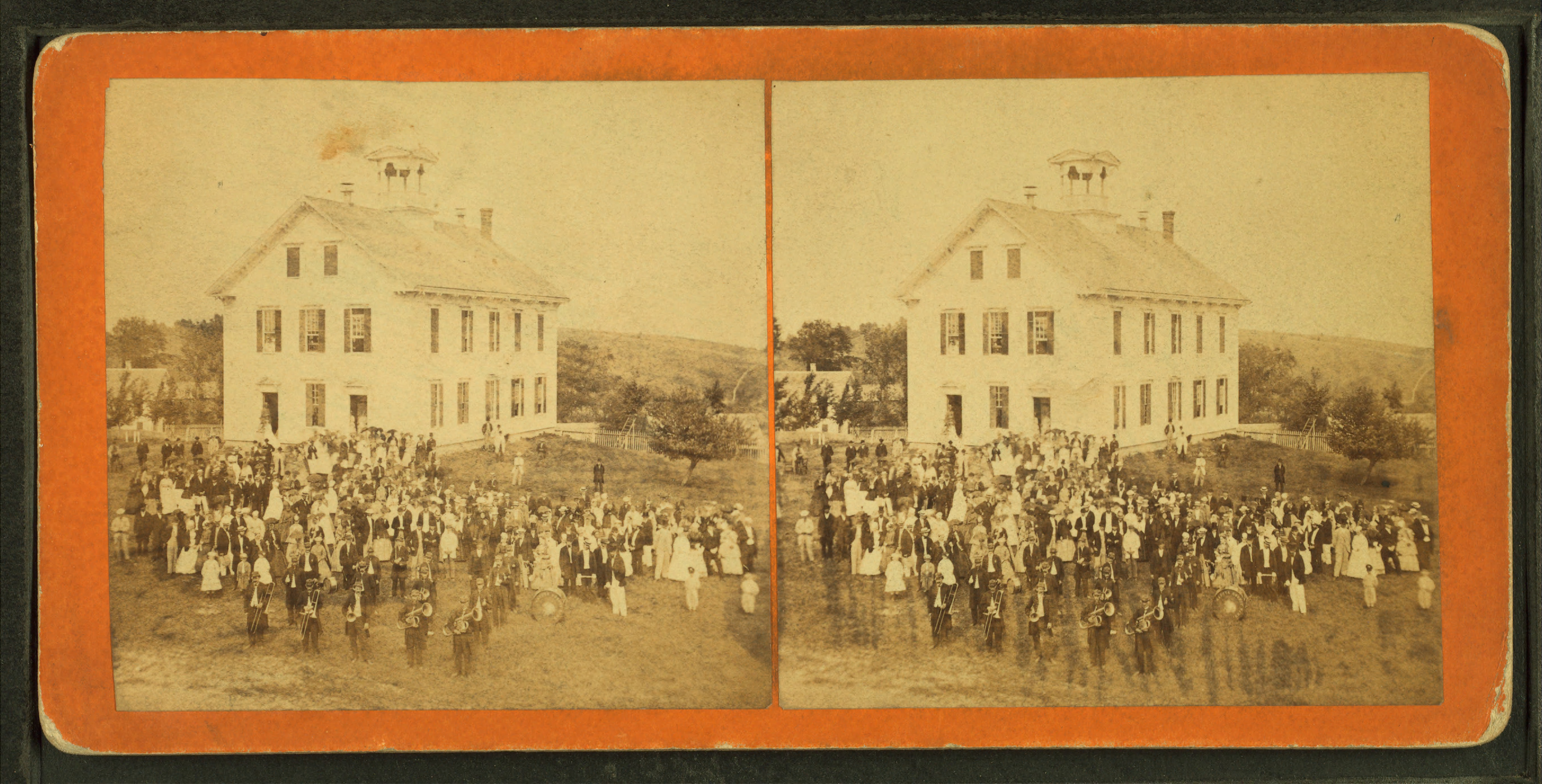
The Appleton Academy (now McCollom Building) c. 1875

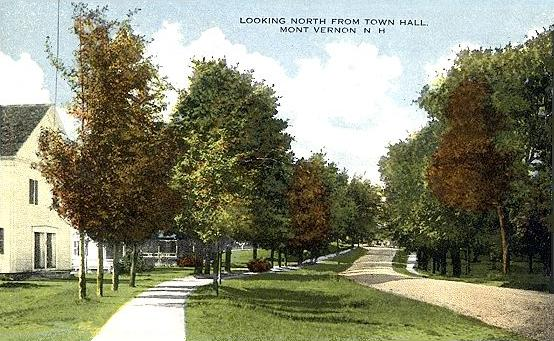
North from Town Hall c. 1915

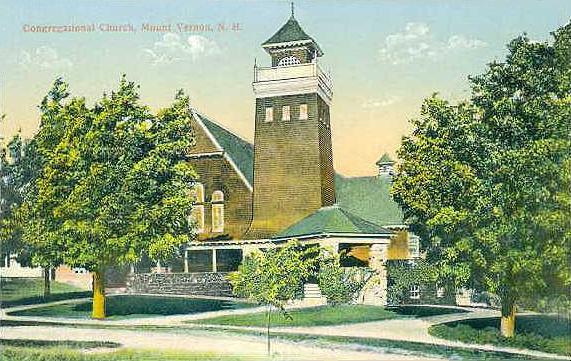
Congregational Church c. 1910

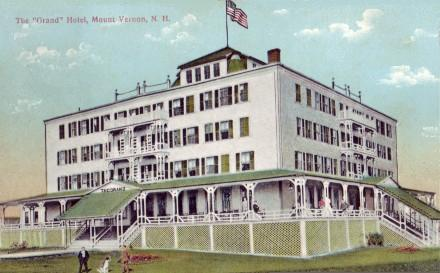
The Grand Hotel in 1909

== Geography ==
According to the United States Census Bureau, the town has a total area of 16.9 square miles (43.8 km^{2}), of which 16.8 square miles (43.6 km^{2}) are land and 0.1 square miles (0.2 km^{2}) are water, comprising 0.49% of the town. Mont Vernon is drained by Beaver Brook, Hartshorn Brook, and Purgatory Brook, south-flowing tributaries of the Souhegan River. The northwestern corner of town is drained by Lords Brook, a northward-flowing tributary of the South Branch Piscataquog River. The entire town is part of the Merrimack River watershed. The town's highest point is on its northern border, at 1,015 feet (309 m) above sea level, near the summit of Storey Hill.

Mont Vernon is served by one state highway, New Hampshire Route 13, which runs north–south through the center of town connecting Milford and New Boston.

=== Adjacent municipalities ===
- New Boston (north)
- Amherst (east)
- Milford (south)
- Lyndeborough (west)

== Demographics ==
Historical population
Census	Pop.	Note	%±
1800	680		—
1810	762		12.1%
1820	729		−4.3%
1830	763		4.7%
1840	720		−5.6%
1850	722		0.3%
1860	725		0.4%
1870	601		−17.1%
1880	517		−14.0%
1890	479		−7.4%
1900	453		−5.4%
1910	413		−8.8%
1920	308		−25.4%
1930	302		−1.9%
1940	340		12.6%
1950	405		19.1%
1960	585		44.4%
1970	906		54.9%
1980	1,444		59.4%
1990	1,812		25.5%
2000	2,034		12.3%
2010	2,409		18.4%
2020	2,584		7.3%
2024 (est.)	2,683		3.8%
U.S. Decennial Census

As of the census of 2020, there were 2,584 people and 945 households residing in the town. The population density was 154 inhabitants per square mile (59.3/km^{2}). There were 974 housing units, of which 29, or 2.98%, were vacant. The racial makeup of the town was 89.7% White, 0.7% African American, 0.1% Native American, 1.2% Asian, 1.4% some other race, and 6.8% from two or more races. Hispanic or Latino of any race were 3.5% of the population.

Of the 945 households in 2020, 30.9% had children under the age of 18 living with them, 71.0% were married couples living together, 14.0% had a female householder with no spouse present, and 10.7% had a male householder with no spouse present. 14.5% of all households were made up of individuals, and 7.1% had someone living alone who was 65 years of age or older. 23.0% of the population were under the age of 18, 6.3% were from 18 to 24, 20.0% from 25 to 44, 34.3% from 45 to 64, and 16.5% were 65 years of age or older. The median age was 45.5 years. Females comprised 50.12% of the population.

As of the period 2018–22, the median income for a household in the town was $156,667, the median income for a family was $171,429, and the median income for a nonfamily household was $84,167. The per capita income for the town was $63,344.

== Education ==
The only public school in town is the Mont Vernon Village School. It is an elementary school, with grades kindergarten to six. For seventh and eighth grades, Mont Vernon sends its students to Amherst Middle School. For ninth through 12th grades, the students are sent to Souhegan High School, which is in Amherst but jointly owned by Amherst and Mont Vernon. Mont Vernon and Amherst comprise the school administrative unit SAU 39.

Mont Vernon had a private school that started as the Appleton Academy in 1853 and was renamed the McCollom Institute in 1871, which closed shortly before the turn of the century. The building was used as a public high school for a few years, and later became the private Stearns School, which operated from 1906 to 1937, when it closed its doors due to low enrollment during the Great Depression. The building was later used for a public elementary school and as of 2024 houses the police department and town offices.

== Fire department ==
The former two-story Mont Vernon Fire Station, built in 1947, was located on North Main Street next to the Town Hall. This station had 6 apparatus bays. In March 2007 the town voted to raze the deteriorating building and replace it with a new fire station on the same lot. The new station has 5 apparatus bays facing North Main Street, and 1 bay facing Pinkham Avenue. The Fire Chief has his office in the station, along with a radio and report room, a meeting room, and an office for the Emergency Management Director. The station also contains maintenance, storage, and work rooms. Emergency medical services are provided by Amherst.

== Crime ==
Mont Vernon made national news on October 4, 2009, when a home invasion in the town resulted in the murder of Kimberly Cates. The case received significant coverage due to the crime's brutality, since both victims were assaulted with a machete, the randomness by which the home was chosen with intent to murder (the victims and perpetrators did not know each other), the apparent lack of remorse, and the attackers ages of 19 and 17. The case also led to changes to New Hampshire's capital punishment laws.

== Culture ==
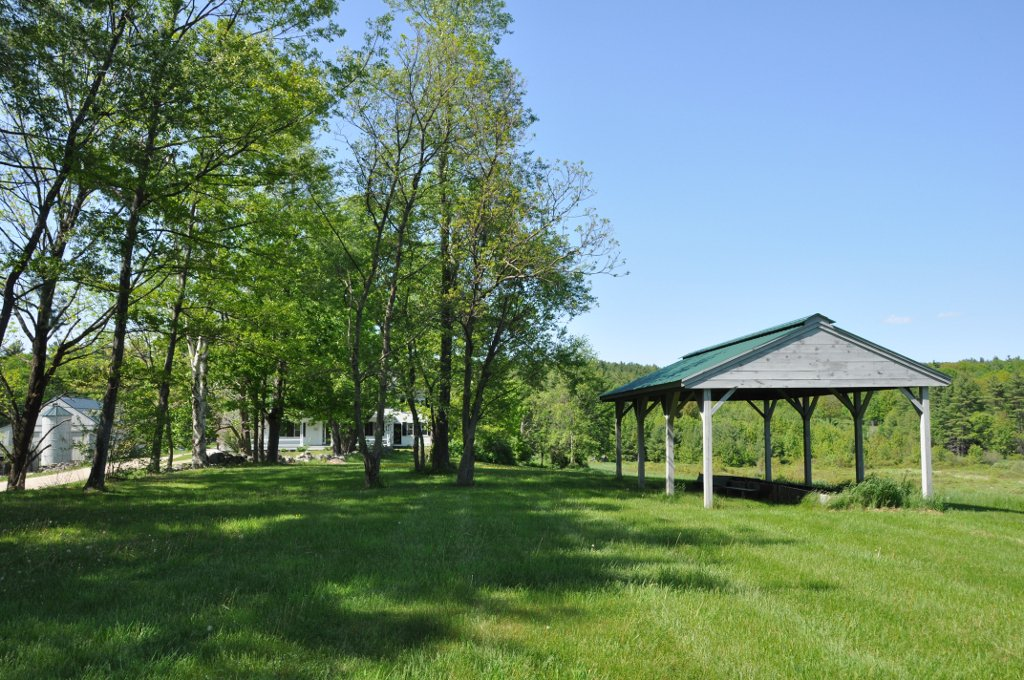
Outbuilding at town-owned Lamson Farm

The town has two major annual celebrations: On the last Saturday in September, it hosts "Lamson Farm Day" at a town-owned farm to celebrate its agricultural past. In late April or early May, it has a celebration of spring called the "Mont Vernon Spring Gala". Both feature games, food and local entertainers.

== Sports ==
The town has two sports teams that compete regionally. They are the Mont Vernon Falcons basketball team and the Mont Vernon Acers volleyball team. Both teams are for girls age 9–12. The Mont Vernon Village School (grades K–6) has a basketball court and volleyball court. Adult volleyball has been playing on Monday nights at the school since the early 1990s. The town owns land near the school that has a baseball field with bases, fencing and two dugouts. The adjacent field is also used for many other sports. Golf was played behind what is now the site of the post office is in the early 1900s.

There is a gun range in town (the Purgatory Falls Fish & Game Club). There was a ski hill with a rope tow that disbanded in the middle of the 20th century. Mont Vernon is known for views over the Souhegan Valley and has hiking trails, especially in town-owned Lamson Farm and along Purgatory Brook, which forms most of its western border. The Morrissette Trail, opened in May 2012, goes from the lowest to the highest points in Mont Vernon for an elevation gain of 700 feet (210 m) (315 to 1,015 feet (96 to 309 m)). It is sponsored by Summit for a Cure.

== Notable people ==
- Doc Adams (1814–1899), baseball pioneer, New York Knickerbockers player and executive
- George Wilkins Kendall (1809–1867), journalist, Mexican–American War correspondent, and founder of The New Orleans Picayune
- Erland Van Lidth De Jeude (1953–1987), actor and amateur wrestler
- Ryan M. Pitts (born 1985), Congressional Medal of Honor recipient
- Alex Preston (born 1993), musician, American Idol (season 13) top 3 finalist
