= Julie Radhakrishnan =

American politician

Member of New Hampshire House of Representatives for Hillsborough 22
- In office December 5, 2018 – December 2, 2020

Personal details
- Party: Democratic

Julie Radhakrishnan is an American politician. She was a member of the New Hampshire House of Representatives.
