= Amherst, New Hampshire =

- Town
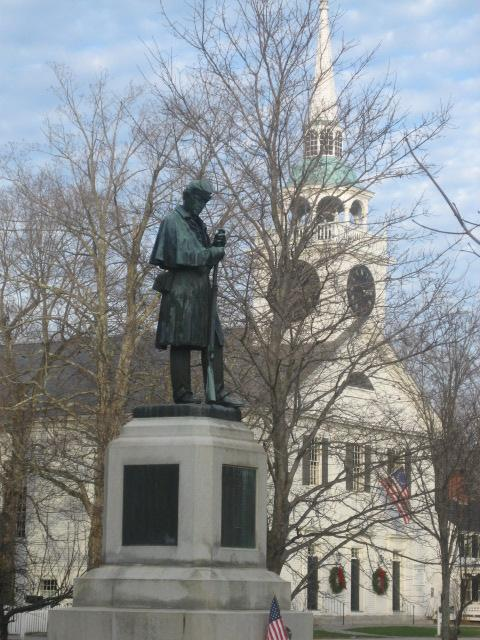
- Amherst Town Common in 2006

- Seal

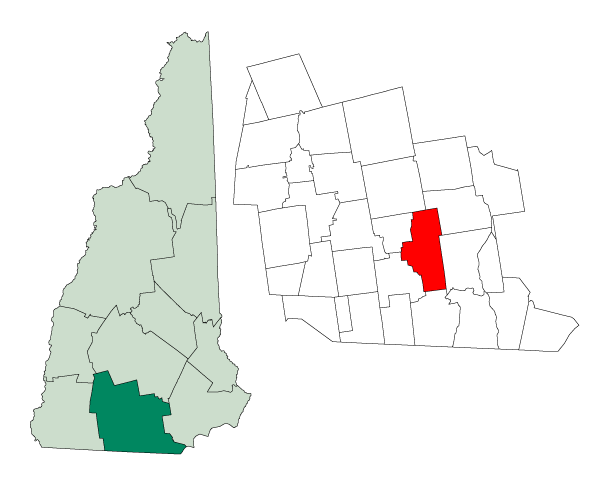
- Location in Hillsborough County, New Hampshire
- Coordinates: 42°52′41″N 71°37′31″W
- Country: United States
- State: New Hampshire
- County: Hillsborough
- Incorporated: 1760

Area
  - Total: 34.4 sq mi (89.1 km^{2})
  - Land: 33.9 sq mi (87.8 km^{2})
  - Water: 0.50 sq mi (1.3 km^{2}) 1.49%
- Elevation: 302 ft (92 m)

Population (2020)
  - Total: 11,753
  - Density: 347/sq mi (133.9/km^{2})
- Time zone: UTC−5 (Eastern)
  - Summer (DST): UTC−4 (Eastern)
- ZIP code: 03031
- Area code: 603
- FIPS code: 33-01300
- GNIS feature ID: 873531
- Website: www.amherstnh.gov

Amherst is a town in Hillsborough County in the state of New Hampshire, United States. The population was 11,753 at the 2020 census. Amherst is home to Ponemah Bog Wildlife Sanctuary, Hodgman State Forest, the Joe English Reservation and Baboosic Lake.

The village of Amherst, where 697 people lived at the 2020 census, is defined as the Amherst census-designated place and is listed on the National Register of Historic Places as Amherst Village Historic District.

== History ==
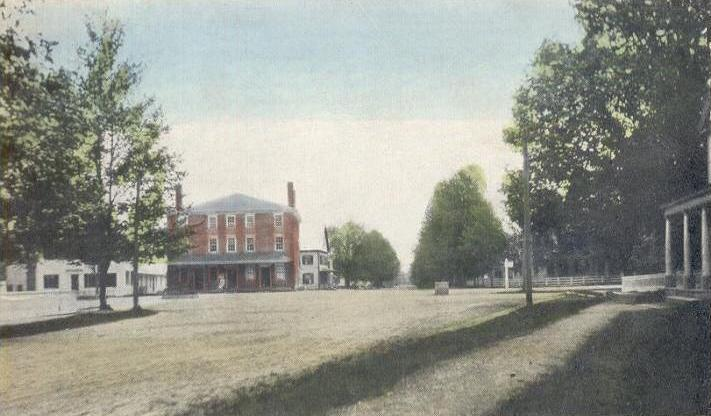
A photograph of Amherst taken in 1910

Like many towns in New England, Amherst was founded via a land grant issued to members of the colonial militia; the land grant which led to the town's foundation was issued in 1728 to veterans of King Philip's War. A colonial settlement was established at the land grant's location five years later in 1733, being initially named "Narragansett Number 3" and later "Souhegan Number 3". In 1741, the settlement's inhabitants established a Congregational church and hired a minister to preach in the settlement. On January 18, 1760, the settlement was chartered by the governor of New Hampshire Benning Wentworth, who renamed it after General Jeffery Amherst, who served as Commander-in-Chief, North America during the French and Indian War. Wentworth chartered Amherst as part of a wave of land grants he issued during the mid-18th century.

In 1770, Amherst became the county seat of Hillsborough County, due largely to its location on the county's major east-west road. It continued to prosper through the Revolutionary War and afterwards. In 1790, the southwestern section broke off and became the town of Milford, and in 1803, the northwest section departed to become Mont Vernon. The development of water-powered mills allowed Milford to grow at Amherst's expense, and the county seat was moved to Milford in 1866.

The town population remained relatively stagnant until after World War II, when Amherst and many surrounding towns saw an influx of newcomers as the town became part of the Greater Boston region.

Franklin Pierce, who later become the 14th President of the United States studied under Judge Edmund Parker in Amherst. He wed Jane Means Appleton, the daughter of a former president of Bowdoin College, in a house on the town green.

The Nashua and Wilton Railroad passed through Amherst.

== Government and politics ==
Amherst town presidential vote
Year	Democratic	Republican	Third parties
2024	57.2% 4,674	41.0% 3,347	1.8% 146
2020	58.9% 4,796	39.4% 3,208	1.5% 133
2016	51.4% 3,777	44.5% 3,271	4.0% 299
2012	46.5% 3,501	51.9% 3,906	1.6% 114
2008	51.4% 3,822	47.6% 3,536	1.0% 68

Amherst is located in New Hampshire's 2nd congressional district, represented by Democrat Maggie Goodlander (D-Nashua). The town is located in New Hampshire's 11th State Senate district, represented by Republican Tim McGough (R-Merrimack).

In the New Hampshire House of Representatives, Amherst has two districts covering the town. Hillsborough 34 is a district with three seats covering just the town of Amherst; it is currently represented by three Democrats: Dan Leclerc, Stephanie Grund, and Dan Veilleux. Amherst also shares Hillsborough 37, a single-member district, with the neighboring town of Milford, New Hampshire; it is represented by Democrat Megan Murray (D-Amherst).

== Geography ==
According to the United States Census Bureau, the town has a total area of 34.4 square miles (89.1 km^{2}), of which 33.9 square miles (87.8 km^{2}) are land and 0.50 square miles (1.3 km^{2}), or 1.49% of the total area, are water. The entire town is part of the Merrimack River watershed. The Souhegan River, an east-flowing tributary of the Merrimack, passes through the southern part of the town, and the Souhegan's tributary Beaver Brook drains the central part of town and passes through the main village. Baboosic Lake is farther north, along the eastern border of the town and is fed by Joe English Brook. The lake drains to the east into Baboosic Brook, a tributary of the Merrimack. Pulpit Brook, which drains the northeastern corner of the town, flows into Baboosic Brook as well. Witches Brook flows through the southernmost part of the town and is a tributary of Pennichuck Brook, yet another tributary of the Merrimack. Amherst's highest point is on Chestnut Hill at the town's northern border, where the elevation reaches 865 feet (264 m) above sea level.

New Hampshire Route 101 crosses the town, leading northeast into Bedford and then to Manchester, and southwest into Milford. A spur, New Hampshire Route 101A, crosses the southern part of Amherst, connecting Milford to the west with Nashua to the southeast. New Hampshire Route 122 begins at Amherst village and leads south into Hollis.

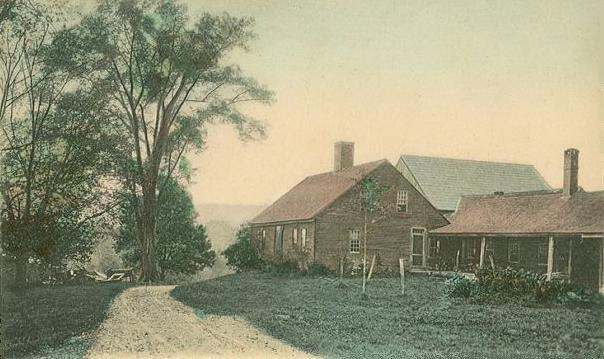
Greeley birthplace c. 1905

=== Adjacent municipalities ===
- Bedford, New Hampshire (northeast)
- Merrimack, New Hampshire (east)
- Hollis, New Hampshire (south)
- Milford, New Hampshire (southwest)
- Mont Vernon, New Hampshire (west)
- New Boston, New Hampshire (northwest)

== Demographics ==
Historical population
Census	Pop.	Note	%±
1790	2,369		—
1800	1,470		−37.9%
1810	1,554		5.7%
1820	1,622		4.4%
1830	1,657		2.2%
1840	1,565		−5.6%
1850	1,613		3.1%
1860	1,598		−0.9%
1870	1,353		−15.3%
1880	1,225		−9.5%
1890	1,053		−14.0%
1900	1,231		16.9%
1910	1,060		−13.9%
1920	868		−18.1%
1930	1,115		28.5%
1940	1,174		5.3%
1950	1,461		24.4%
1960	2,051		40.4%
1970	4,605		124.5%
1980	8,243		79.0%
1990	9,068		10.0%
2000	10,769		18.8%
2010	11,201		4.0%
2020	11,753		4.9%
2024 (est.)	11,914		1.4%
U.S. Decennial Census

As of the census of 2010, there were 11,201 people, 4,063 households, and 3,322 families residing in the town. The population density was 327.5 inhabitants per square mile (126.4/km^{2}). There were 4,280 housing units at an average density of 125.1 per square mile (48.3/km^{2}). The racial makeup of the town was 95.8% White, 0.5% African American, 0.1% Native American, 1.7% Asian, 0.04% Pacific Islander, 0.4% some other race, and 1.5% from two or more races. Hispanic or Latino of any race were 1.9% of the population.

There were 4,063 households, out of which 37.7% had children under the age of 18 living with them, 72.2% were headed by married couples living together, 6.7% had a female householder with no husband present, and 18.2% were non-families. 14.5% of all households were made up of individuals, and 6.0% were someone living alone who was 65 years of age or older. The average household size was 2.76, and the average family size was 3.06.

In the town, the age distribution of the population was 26.0% under the age of 18, 5.6% from 18 to 24, 19.4% from 25 to 44, 36.5% from 45 to 64, and 12.5% who were 65 years of age or older. The median age was 44.4 years. For every 100 females, there were 97.0 males. For every 100 females age 18 and over, there were 96.5 males.

For the period 2011-2015, the estimated median annual income for a household in the town was $121,349, and the median income for a family was $130,278. Male full-time workers had a median income of $102,869, versus $51,473 for females. The per capita income for the town was $49,190. About 1.8% of families and 2.9% of the population were below the poverty line, including 3.4% of those under age 18 and 2.6% of those age 65 or over.

== Public education ==
Amherst is home to Clark and Wilkins elementary schools, Amherst Middle School and Souhegan High School. The elementary schools handle children from Amherst only. Seventh and eighth graders from neighboring Mont Vernon attend the middle school on a tuition basis, while Amherst and Mont Vernon jointly own Souhegan High School, which serves both towns.

== Notable people ==
- Charles G. Atherton (1804–1853), U.S. congressman and senator
- Charles Humphrey Atherton (1773–1853), U.S. congressman
- Courtney Banghart (born 1978), head women's basketball coach at North Carolina.
- John S. Barry (1802–1870), fourth and eighth governor of Michigan
- Samuel Bell (1770–1850), 14th governor of New Hampshire
- Moses Billings (1809–1884), portrait artist
- Ainsworth Blunt (1800–1865), missionary to the Cherokee in Georgia
- Hubert Buchanan (born 1941), prisoner of war in Vietnam
- Clifton Clagett (1762–1829), U.S. congressman
- Jonathan Fisk (1778–1832), U.S. congressman from New York
- Horace Greeley (1811–1872), editor, founder of the Liberal Republican Party
- Jon "maddog" Hall (born 1950), programmer, computer scientist, free software advocate
- Joanne Head (1930–2021), member of the New Hampshire House of Representatives
- Neal Huntington (born 1969), General Manager of the Pittsburgh Pirates (2007–2019)
- Tony Labranche (born 2001), youngest member of the New Hampshire House of Representatives as of 2021
- Moses Nichols (1740–1790), physician, Revolutionary War era soldier and statesman
- Jane Means (Appleton) Pierce (1806–1863), first lady, wife of Franklin Pierce
- Frank Selee (1859–1909), manager for the Boston Beaneaters and Chicago Orphans, member of Baseball Hall of Fame
- Jason Sorens (born 1976), founder of the Free State Project
- Rick Wills, bassist of rock band Foreigner
