= Lyndeborough Center Historic District =

Historic district in New Hampshire, United States

- U.S. National Register of Historic Places
- U.S. Historic district
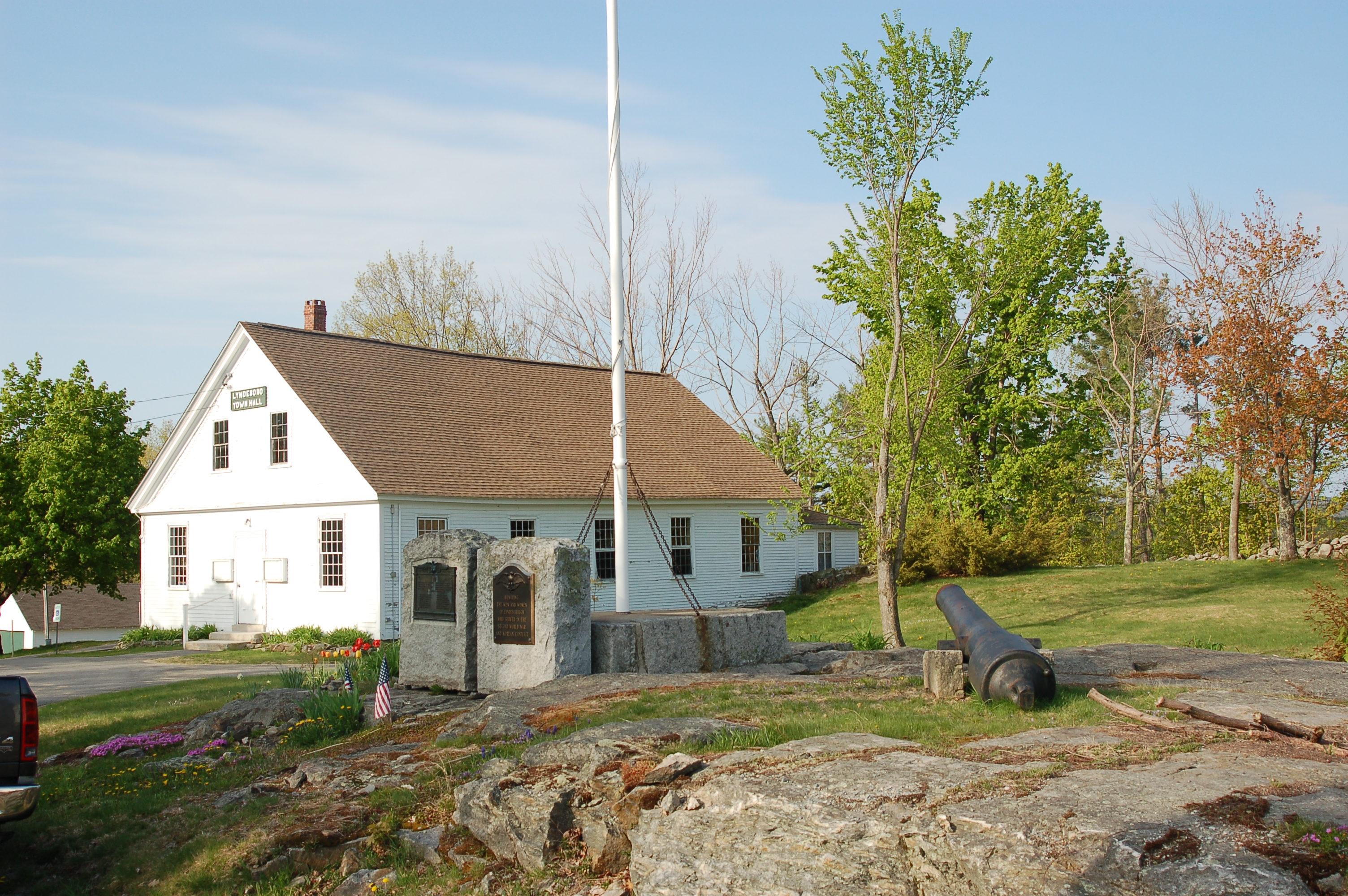
- The Hartshorn Cannon, flagpole, and war memorials, April 2010. The Old Town Hall sits behind them. Behind that is the former Town Highway Barn.

- Location within New Hampshire Location within the United States
- Location: Center Rd; Lyndeborough, New Hampshire
- Coordinates: 42°54′23″N 71°45′58″W
- NRHP reference No.: 84002814
- Added to NRHP: June 7, 1984

The Lyndeborough Center Historic District, located in the town of Lyndeborough, New Hampshire, United States, consists of three structures: the Town Pound, Town Hall, and Congregational Church. The district was placed on the National Register of Historic Places in 1984. In 2010, by town meeting vote, this district became part of a larger, officially zoned local historic district.

== Town Pound ==
The Town Pound is a square-shaped stone structure, open at the top and entered through a gate. It was constructed in 1774, and originally was topped with a wooden enclosure.

== Town Hall ==
The Town Hall is Lyndeborough's third completed hall, and the second to occupy a site in the Historic District. (The town's second Town Hall, a two-story, 50-by-40-foot (15 by 12 m) meetinghouse, occupied roughly the same site from c. 1769 until 1845.) The current hall is a 1 1/2-story Greek Revival building, constructed in 1845-46 as a 35-by-40-foot (11 by 12 m) building with a meeting hall and one anteroom at the southeast corner. In 1883, the town significantly enlarged the building by removing the west wall and adding a 12.5-foot-deep (3.8 m) addition to the back of the building and installing partitions to create the northeast anteroom (now used as a kitchen)and a small entry foyer.

In 1890, apparently at the urging of and with the help of the Pinnacle Grange (the local chapter of The National Grange of the Order of Patrons of Husbandry), the town increased the pitch of the roof, thereby adding space in the attic for dinners and other functions, and added an ell to the southwest corner. At this time a metal roof was added to the building, though it was removed in 1919. A metal ceiling was installed in the meeting room in 1913, an Arts-and-Crafts-style stage sometime between 1913 and 1919, and a second chimney behind the stage in 1920. (The piano now sitting against the stage wall dates from 1919.) A storage area was added to the back of the building in 1913. The attic was remodeled in 1934, and electricity was installed in the building in 1937. Since 1975, the building has appeared on Lyndeborough's unofficial town seal.

== Congregational Church ==
The Greek Revival-style Congregational Church dates from 1837, when pressure from the Baptist Society resulted in the church moving out of the third town hall. According to Donovan and Woodward, in their History of Lyndeborough, the church steeple was shortened sometime in the nineteenth century when it was hit by lightning; in fact, exterior details suggest the entire steeple may have been rebuilt prior to or during the mid-1850s, when the church bell was added. The interior of the church was extensively remodeled in the 1890s, and the entire structure underwent major structural repairs in the mid-1980s. Since the merging of the Baptist and Congregationalist churches in town, the church has been under the control of the United Church of Lyndeborough. Currently it is used for summer services, as the building is not heated.

From 1837 until about 1920, horse sheds occupied the area between the Congregational Church and the Town Pound.

== Roads and stone walls ==
Three roads pass through the Historic District: Center Road, which is a paved class-IV (state-maintained) road; Stone Bridge Road, which is an unpaved class-VI (unmaintained town) road; and an unnamed class-VI right-of-way connecting Center Road to a lower section of Stone Bridge Road. Center Road was created as a two-rod (33-foot) right-of-way sometime before 1770, and was widened to three rods (50 feet) as part of a project to create a road across Hillsborough County in 1800-1804. The right-of-way was widened in 1840 between New Road and Stone Bridge Road because of problems relating to blowing snow. The original section of Center Road, which ran much closer to the Old Town Hall, Town Pound, Congregational Church, and Congregational Parsonage, was not discontinued, but generally fell into disuse as a travelled road after 1840. It is now part of the town common.

Stone Bridge Road is a two-rod (33-foot) right-of-way that was constructed in 1770 to connect Lyndeborough Center (and the meetinghouse) to western Lyndeborough. The road connected to Putnam Hill Road, which allowed travel from the Town Hall to the site of the first town meetinghouse, into South Lyndeborough and through what later became the South Lyndeborough Village Common, and along Citizens' Hall Road and Pettingill Hill Road before veering southward into Wilton.

The unnamed class-VI road appears as a road on an 1858 map of Hillsborough County, but like Stone Bridge Road, fell into disuse by 1892 (though it was never discontinued, and thus legally is still a public right-of-way). Under New Hampshire law it is a prescriptive road, created through "adverse possession" (continuous public use) over a 20-year period prior to January 1, 1968. Thus, the width of the right-of-way is legally undetermined, but is assumed to be two rods.

The stone walls behind the Town Pound, Town Hall, and former Town Barn date from about 1800. The stone wall along the east side of Center Road dates from 1840, when the road was moved to its current position.

== Town Common ==
The Town Common between the current Town Hall and Congregational Church, and which runs in front of the church and Town Pound, was created in 1840 when Center Road was moved to its current location east of the original right-of-way. The right-of-way over the common was never discontinued, giving the town the right to use the common space for public purposes.

However, the remainder of the land around the Town Hall has been referred to as the "Common" since at least 1770, during construction of the original meetinghouse at this site. Originally the common extended from what today is the north side of the Town Pound to the north side of the Center Cemetery. (The cemetery was added around 1800.) However, the town sold a small portion of the common adjacent to the cemetery's north side in 1817 to pay for repairs to the original meetinghouse. Today that land—approximately one acre in area—is a privately owned apple orchard. Meanwhile, the area west of the meetinghouse became private property at an undetermined time in the 19th century, but was donated back to the town in 2001.

In 1940 the town added a flagpole to the common. The current fiberglass pole which replaced it dates from approximately 1999.

== Town Barn ==
The historic district also includes a noncontributing (newer) structure, the Town Barn. Constructed c. 1938, the building housed the town's highway department until the mid-1980s. In 1997, the town rented it to the Lafayette Artillery Company for 99 years at $1 per year. It continues to serve as the Artillery's headquarters. The building occupies a site immediately adjacent to the former location of the town's old late-nineteenth-century hearse house.

== Controlling organizations ==
Currently, several entities oversee the properties that compose the Lyndeborough Center Historic District. By state statute, the Board of Selectmen controls the Town Hall, Town Pound, common, and roads. The Lyndeborough Highway Department oversees general maintenance of the grounds. The local Cemetery Trustees oversee the cemetery (which is part of the local historic district, but is not part of the federally recognized historic district). The Lafayette Artillery Company rents the Town Barn. The United Church of Lyndeborough controls the church building, though technically the building continues to belong to the Congregational Society/United Church of Christ. From the late 1980s until 2010, the local Meetinghouse Committee recommended repairs to the Town House to the Board of Selectmen. Starting in 2010, the Lyndeborough Center Historic District Commission has overseen issues relating to historic preservation and zoning for the entire district, with special attention to the maintenance, repair, and restoration of the Town Hall. The commission adopted rules and regulations pertaining to the district on September 13, 2012. Finally, the Lyndeborough Trails Association has worked to improve Stone Bridge Road for the use of horse traffic.

== Local monuments controversy ==
In 2009, a controversy erupted over the historic district when the Meetinghouse Committee, which at the time advised the Board of Selectmen on matters relating to the upkeep to the Town Hall, suggested that the Selectmen approve the permanent removal of the town's war memorials and Civil War-era Hartshorn Memorial Cannon to the historic district. The monuments were moved to the center temporarily, but who moved them—and on whose authority—remains unknown. Subsequently, in 2010, a town Monuments Committee determined that the move was not appropriate, as it created a new focal point which detracted from the historic district's authenticity. In April 2010, the Board of Selectmen voted to move the monuments to South Lyndeborough, from which they had been taken.

== See also ==
- Citizens' Hall
- National Register of Historic Places listings in Hillsborough County, New Hampshire

== Sources ==
- S.P. Brooks. 2012. "Report to the Selectmen of Lyndeborough on the Condition of the Old Town Hall." Unpublished.
- F.G. Clark. 1892. Historical Address Given at the One Hundred and Fiftieth Anniversary of the Settlement of the Town of Lyndeborough, N.H., September 4, 1889. Concord, NH: Republican Press Association.
- D. Donovan and Jacob Woodward. 1906. The History of the Town of Lyndeborough, New Hampshire, 1735–1905. H. W. Whittemore and Co.
- History of Lyndeborough, New Hampshire, 1905–1955. Lyndeborough: Town of Lyndeborough, NH, 1956.
- "Library Plan Could Displace Memorials," The Cabinet (Milford NH) October 1, 2009.
- "Lyndeborough Village Common Cleanup Planned for Saturday," The Cabinet (Milford NH) April 22, 2010.
- Nick Martin, "Who Moved Lyndeborough's Monuments?" Ledger Transcript (Peterborough NH) November 10, 2009.
- F. Merkle. 1984. "Report on the Condition of the Lyndeborough Town Hall, Town Pound, and Center Church." Unpublished.
- S.C. Roper. 2012. "The Lyndeborough Town Hall: Architectural History and Cultural Inventory." Prepared for the Historic District Commission and Heritage Commission of the Town of Lyndeborough, NH. Unpublished.
- S.C. Roper. 2005. "Divisions of Fence in Lyndeborough, New Hampshire, 1800-1903." PAST: Pioneer America Society Transactions 28, 1-11.
- Stephanie Abbot Roper and Scott C. Roper. 2004. Citizen Soldiers: New Hampshire's Lafayette Artillery Company, 1804–2004. Portsmouth, NH: Peter E. Randall, Publisher.
- United States Department of the Interior, National Park Service. 1983. "National Register of Historic Places Inventory--Nomination Form: Lyndeborough Center Historic District." Unpublished.
