= Wilton (CDP), New Hampshire =

Census-designated place in New Hampshire, United States

Wilton, New Hampshire
- Census-designated place
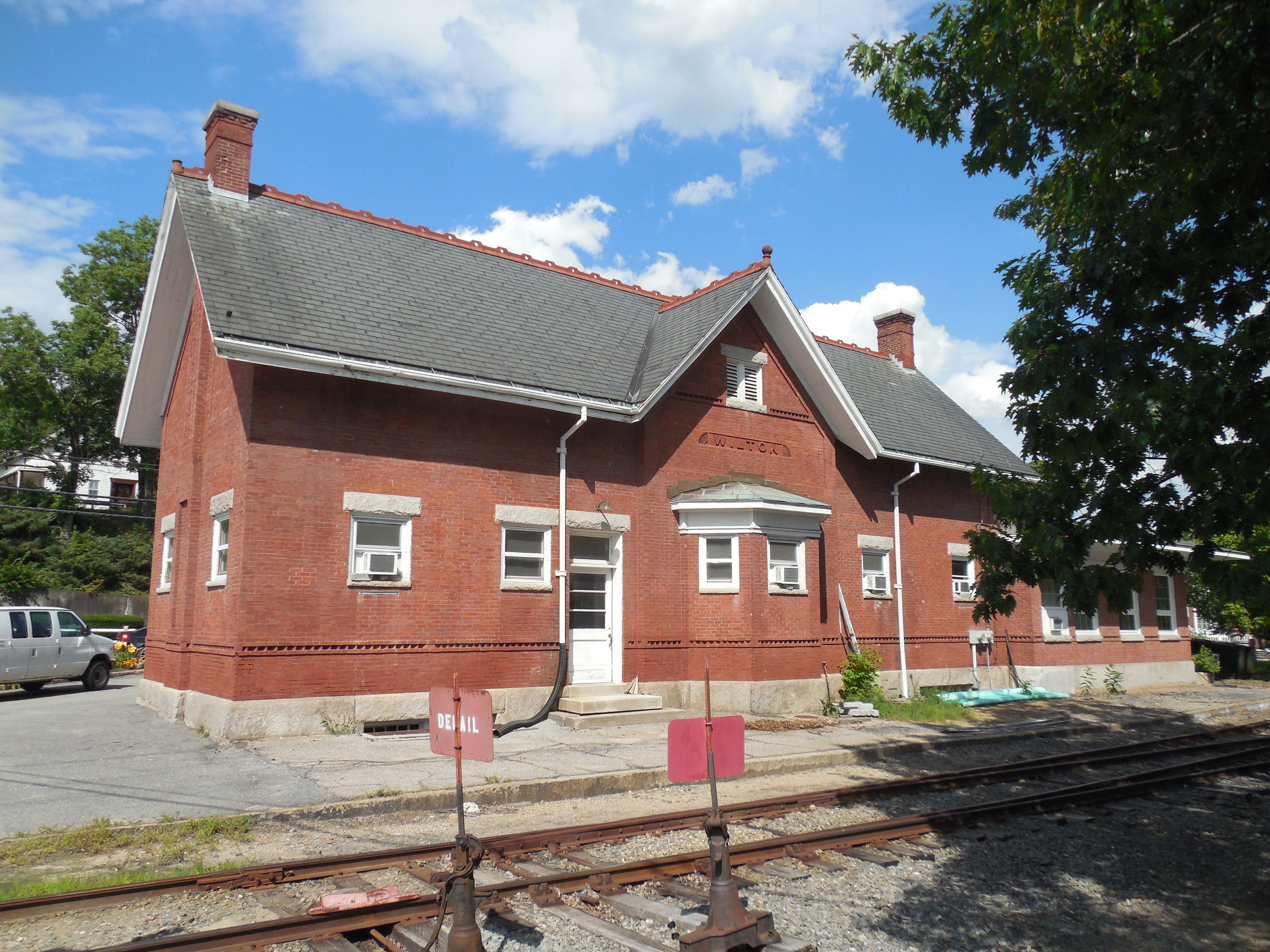
- Wilton Station

- Location within New Hampshire Location within the United States
- Coordinates: 42°50′36″N 71°44′6″W
- Country: United States
- State: New Hampshire
- County: Hillsborough
- Towns: Wilton, Milford

Area
  - Total: 2.11 sq mi (5.46 km^{2})
  - Land: 2.11 sq mi (5.46 km^{2})
  - Water: 0 sq mi (0.00 km^{2})
- Elevation: 380 ft (120 m)

Population (2020)
  - Total: 1,324
  - Density: 628.2/sq mi (242.54/km^{2})
- Time zone: UTC-5 (Eastern (EST))
  - Summer (DST): UTC-4 (EDT)
- ZIP codes: 03086 (Wilton); 03055 (Milford)
- Area code: 603
- FIPS code: 33-85140
- GNIS feature ID: 2378096

Wilton is a census-designated place (CDP) and the main village in the town of Wilton, New Hampshire, United States. The CDP extends east into the town of Milford as well. The population of the CDP was 1,324 at the 2020 census, up from 1,163 at the 2010 census.

== Geography ==
The CDP occupies the northeastern part of the town of Wilton, along the Souhegan River, where it is joined from the northwest by Stony Brook. It extends west out Sand Hill Road as far as Holt Road and is bordered to the north in Wilton by Curtis Farm Road, Dale Street, and Pead Hill Road. The CDP extends east into the northwestern corner of the town of Milford, where it is bordered to the north by the town of Lyndeborough and to the south by the Souhegan River. It extends east as far as the former bridge across the Souhegan near Jones Road.

New Hampshire Route 101 runs along the southern edge of the CDP, leading east and northeast 18 miles (29 km) to Bedford and west 13 miles (21 km) to Peterborough. New Hampshire Route 31 passes through the center of the village, leading northwest up the Stony Creek valley 10 miles (16 km) to Greenfield, and southwest up the Souhegan River valley 7 miles (11 km) to Greenville. The city of Nashua is 15 miles (24 km) to the east via Routes 101 and 101A.

According to the U.S. Census Bureau, the Wilton CDP has a total area of 2.1 square miles (5.5 km^{2}), all of it recorded as land.

== Demographics ==
Historical population
Census	Pop.	Note	%±
1950	1,615		—
1960	1,425		−11.8%
1970	1,161		−18.5%
1980	1,310		12.8%
1990	1,165		−11.1%
2000	1,236		6.1%
2010	1,163		−5.9%
2020	1,324		13.8%
U.S. Decennial Census

As of the census of 2010, there were 1,163 people, 455 households, and 293 families residing in the CDP. There were 498 housing units, of which 43, or 8.6%, were vacant. The racial makeup of the CDP was 96.4% white, 0.6% African American, 0.2% Native American, 1.1% Asian, 0.0% Pacific Islander, 0.6% some other race, and 1.1% from two or more races. 2.2% of the population were Hispanic or Latino of any race.

Of the 455 households in the CDP, 38.2% had children under the age of 18 living with them, 46.4% were headed by married couples living together, 15.8% had a female householder with no husband present, and 35.6% were non-families. 29.5% of all households were made up of individuals, and 11.2% were someone living alone who was 65 years of age or older. The average household size was 2.56, and the average family size was 3.18.

27.1% of residents in the CDP were under the age of 18, 7.4% were from age 18 to 24, 28.6% were from 25 to 44, 26.2% were from 45 to 64, and 10.6% were 65 years of age or older. The median age was 36.5 years. For every 100 females, there were 97.1 males. For every 100 females age 18 and over, there were 96.8 males.

For the period 2011–15, the estimated median annual income for a household was $50,565, and the median income for a family was $71,458. The per capita income for the CDP was $32,559.
