= Souhegan =

Souhegan is a word from the Algonquin language, meaning "waiting and watching place". It may refer to:

- Souhegan High School, along the Souhegan River in Amherst, New Hampshire, U.S.
- Souhegan River, in the U.S. state of New Hampshire
- Souhegan Wood Products, a maker of recycled wood products in Wilton, New Hampshire, U.S.

== See also ==
- Skowhegan, Maine
