= Hamblet-Putnam-Frye House =

Historic house in New Hampshire, United States

- U.S. National Register of Historic Places
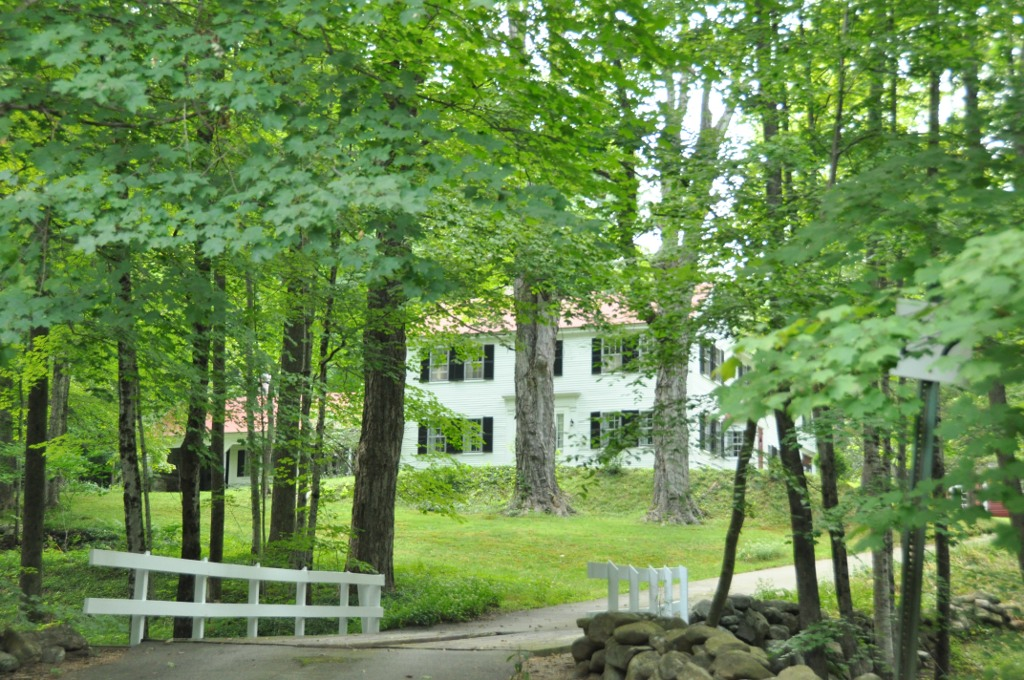

- Location within New Hampshire Location within the United States
- Location: 293 Burton Hwy., Wilton, New Hampshire
- Coordinates: 42°51′23″N 71°47′28″W
- Area: 6.8 acres (2.8 ha)
- Built: 1889
- Architectural style: Georgian
- NRHP reference No.: 00000651
- Added to NRHP: June 22, 2000

The Hamblet-Putnam-Frye House is a historic house at 293 Burton Highway in Wilton, New Hampshire. This two-story wood-frame house was probably built in the 1760s and significantly altered in the late 19th century. The property includes a c. 1840 barn, a c. 1900 carriage house that has been converted into a garage, and a small c. 1900 icehouse. There are also remnants of an early 19th-century mill works, including a stone foundation, canal and sluice gate. The canal and sluice gate were altered in the early 20th century to permit the canal section to be filled for swimming. The northern boundary of the 6.8-acre (2.8 ha) property is defined by a surviving section of a road that was laid out c. 1760 which was taken out of public use before the end of the 18th century.

The property captures the adaptive alteration of early farmsteads and industrial properties to more recreational purpose. The house was built by Hezekiah Hamblet, and acquired in 1808 by Eliphalet Putnam, who operated what is now called Frye's Measure Mill, located just east of this property, as well as the millworks on this land. Although the ownership of the two parcels diverged in the 19th century, they were reunited by purchases made by Alice and Edmund Frye, who used the house as a summer residence, and continued to operate the Frye's Measure Mill, while that on this property was demolished.

The house was listed on the National Register of Historic Places in 2000.

== See also ==
- National Register of Historic Places listings in Hillsborough County, New Hampshire
