= County Farm Bridge (Wilton, New Hampshire) =

- U.S. National Register of Historic Places
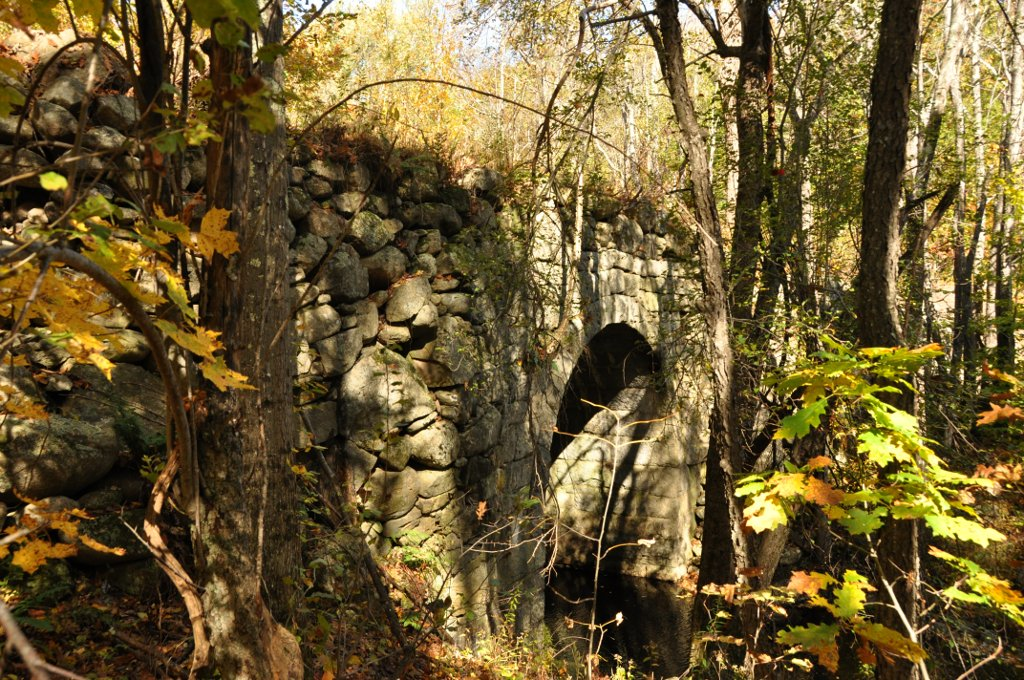

- Location within New Hampshire Location within the United States
- Location: Old County Farm Rd., Wilton, New Hampshire
- Coordinates: 42°51′25″N 71°49′3″W
- Area: less than one acre
- Built: 1885
- Built by: Ward Bros.
- Architectural style: stone arch
- NRHP reference No.: 81000070
- Added to NRHP: May 14, 1981

The County Farm Bridge is a historic stone arch bridge in Wilton, New Hampshire. Built in 1885, it carries Old County Farm over Whiting Brook, just south of its northern junction with Burton Highway in a rural section of northwestern Wilton. It is an unusually late and well-preserved example of a 19th-century stone arch bridge, and was listed on the National Register of Historic Places in 1981.

== Description and history ==
Old County Farm Road was the main access road to the Hillsborough County Poor Farm, and is now an unmaintained class 6 road. The bridge consists of a single stone arch with a span just under 18 feet (5.5 m). It is lined with cut granite voussoirs 18 inches (46 cm) thick. The arch begins on land 7 feet (2.1 m) above the water, and the arch rises to a height of 15 feet 10 inches (4.8 m) above the typical water level. The arch is embedded in a causeway which is 430 feet (130 m) long and has a base width of 29 feet (8.8 m).

The bridge was built in 1885 for the town by the Ward brothers of Lowell, Massachusetts, at a cost of $3,000. The Wards were well known for work they did on railroad bridges, which often employed stone arches. Stone for the bridge was quarried in Wilton, from a quarry that also supplied granite for public works projects in the town center. The bridge has been little altered since its construction: the arch was originally dry laid, but a number of joints in the barrel of the arch have subsequently been mortared with concrete.

== See also ==
- National Register of Historic Places listings in Hillsborough County, New Hampshire
- List of bridges on the National Register of Historic Places in New Hampshire
