= John Putnam Batchelder =

American surgeon and anatomist

- Born: August 6, 1784; Wilton, New Hampshire
- Died: April 8, 1868 (aged 83); New York, New York
- Occupation: Physician

John Putnam Batchelder (August 6, 1784 – April 8, 1868) was an American surgeon and anatomist.

== Biography ==
Batchelder was born in Wilton, New Hampshire, August 6, 1784, into the wealthy family of Archelaus Batchelder; he died in New York City, April 8, 1868. He was a great-nephew of Gen. Israel Putnam through his mother Betsey who was Putnam's niece. After an academic education, he began the study of medicine, and in 1807 was licensed to practice. He did not receive the degree of M. D., however, until 1815, after attendance on the lectures of Harvard Medical School. He began practice in Charlestown, New Hampshire, removed thence to Pittsfield, Massachusetts; afterward to Utica, New York, and in 1843 to New York City. He was appointed professor of anatomy in Castleton State College, Vermont, in 1817, and soon afterward professor of surgical anatomy in the Berkshire Medical Institution at Pittsfield. He was a successful surgeon, and performed many operations of great importance, and requiring extraordinary skill and daring. For many years he made the treatment of diseases of the eye a specialty. He was president of the Academy of Medicine, and of the New York Medical Association in 1858. He published "Thoughts on the Connection of Life, Mind, and Matter", besides essays and medical treatises.
