= Lizette Emma Orth =

American pianist and composer

- Born: July 6, 1858; Milford
- Died: September 14, 1913; Dover
- Occupations: Composer, pianist
- Spouse: John Orth

Lizette Emma Orth (July 6, 1858 – September 14, 1913) was an American pianist and composer.

She was born Lizette Emma Blood on July 6, 1858 in Milford, New Hampshire, the daughter of James Blood and Emeline Wheeler Blood, an accomplished amateur musician. She began studying piano at age ten. In 1877, she began studying under pianist John Orth in Boston and they married in 1883.

Orth composed numerous piano pieces for children and two children's operas, Mother Goose's Jubilee (1901) and The Song of the Sea-shell (1903).

== Works ==
- Op. 1, Four Character Sketches in F, for piano
- Op. 2, Six Recreation Pieces, for piano
- Op. 5, "Mother Goose Songs without Words", seventy piano pieces
- Op. 6, "The Merry-go-round," eighteen piano pieces
- Op. 7, "Daffodils," three piano duets
- Op. 8, 3 Little Piano Pieces
- Op. 10, Ten Tone Pictures for the Piano
- Op. 11, Twelve Miniatures for the Piano
- Op. 12, Mother Goose's Jubilee, sixty songs
- Op. 15, "On the White Keys," an introduction to the piano
- Op. 19, Festival Minuet
- Op. 21, "Ten Little Fingers," ten piano pieces
- Op. 23, "What Little Hands can do," ten piano pieces
- Op. 28, Songs for Sleepy-time, twenty-four children's songs.
