= Oliver Whiting Homestead =

Historic house in New Hampshire, United States

- U.S. National Register of Historic Places
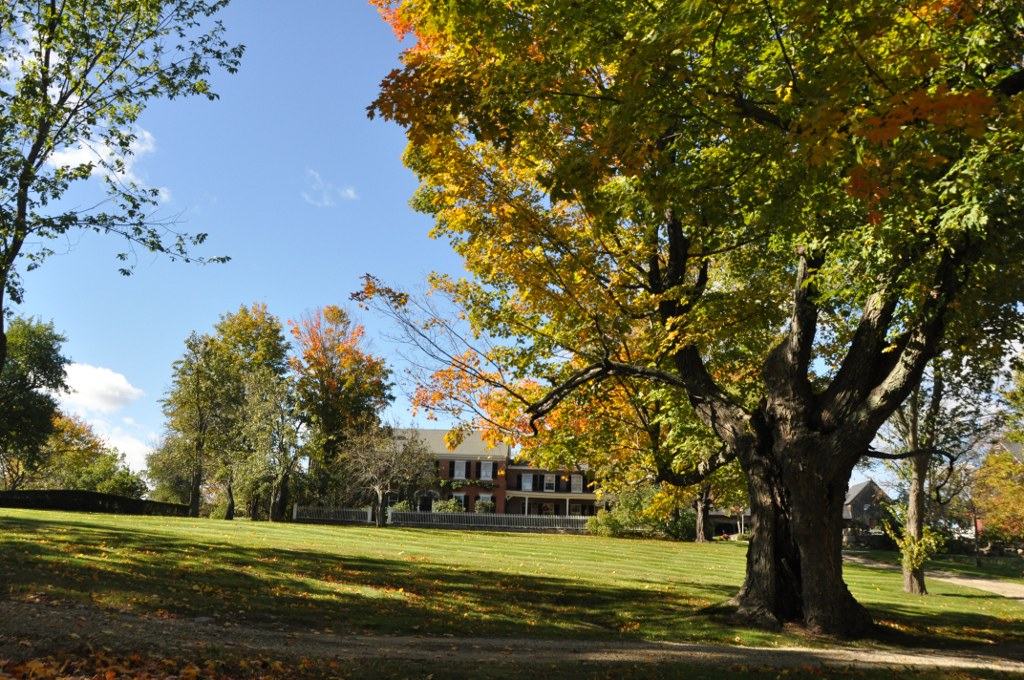

- Location within New Hampshire Location within the United States
- Location: Old County Road, Wilton, New Hampshire
- Coordinates: 42°51′18″N 71°49′21″W
- Area: 72 acres (29 ha)
- Built: 1800
- Architectural style: Gothic Revival, Federal
- NRHP reference No.: 82001686
- Added to NRHP: March 9, 1982

The Oliver Whiting Homestead is a historic farmstead on Old County Farm Road in Wilton, New Hampshire, just south of the County Farm Bridge. The 72-acre (29 ha) property was one of the region's largest dairy farms in the early 19th century, and it was used as Hillsborough County's poor farm between 1867 and 1896. The main focus of the property is a large Federal-style brick house built c. 1800 by Oliver Whiting; it also has an 1846 Gothic Revival barn which predates the establishment of the poor farm. The property was listed on the National Register of Historic Places in 1982.

== Description and history ==
The Whiting family was one of the wealthiest in the neighboring town of Temple, when Lt. Oliver Whiting Jr. was married in 1800. It is believed that the main house on this property was built soon thereafter; its fine period details, which were uncommon in what was then a largely rural community, were probably the result of design influences brought in from other areas by the Whitings. The Whiting farm became the centerpiece of a dairy operation that was by the 1850s the largest in Wilton. Oliver's son David purchased an operation in 1857 that included a daily railroad run to Boston, Massachusetts, carrying fresh milk. The barn, with its Gothic Revival cupola, was built by the Whitings in 1846, and is a good example of a bank barn, with entrances on two levels.

The property was purchased by Hillsborough County in 1867, and adapted for use as a poor farm. A number of buildings were added during this period of the property's history, including a multistory almshouse, water supply infrastructure, and a "pest house", a structure built out of recycled building materials located at a remove from the main building complex. Only foundations of most of these features now survive, since they were dismantled after the poor farm's closure in 1896. In the early 20th century the property was transformed into a summer estate by the Beebe family.

== See also ==
- National Register of Historic Places listings in Hillsborough County, New Hampshire
