= Sarah White Livermore =

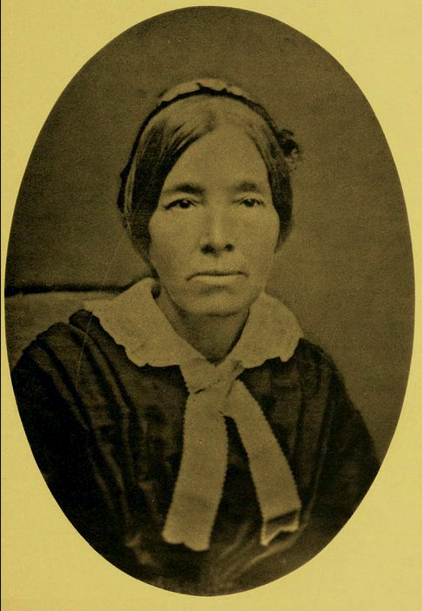
- Born: July 20, 1789; Wilton, New Hampshire, U.S.
- Died: Wilton; July 3, 1874
- Resting place: South Yard Cemetery, Wilton
- Occupations: teacher; writer
- Writing career
- Genres: poetry; prose; hymn lyrics; non-fiction articles
- Notable work: "The Coming of Christ"

Sarah White Livermore (1789–1874) was a 19th-century American teacher and writer of fugitive poetry and prose. She was a lyricist of several hymns, and a magazine writer as well. Livermore spent most of her life teaching school. With Phebe Abbot, she established a Sunday school in Wilton, New Hampshire in May 1816, connected with the Congregational church. It was one of the first, if not the first, in the U.S. to be devoted especially and wholly to religious instruction.

== Biography ==
Sarah White Livermore was born in Wilton, New Hampshire, July 20, 1789. She was the ninth child and fourth daughter of Rev. Jonathan Livermore (1729–1802) and Elizabeth Kidder Livermore (1745–1822).

Her father was the first settled minister in Wilton, on December 14, 1763.

Livermore taught schools frequently in Keene, New Hampshire. About the year 1843, she established a self-supporting boarding school at the Livermore Mansion in Wilton. After a few years, however, she was obliged to relinquish the care of it on account of ill-health.

Her interest in the welfare of children manifested itself in efforts for their religious as well as their secular instruction. She was greatly instrumental in establishing, in her native town, one of the first Sunday schools in the U.S. Seventy children attended the first season. The only book used was the Bible. It was in successful operation as long ago as 1816, when, according to Lewis Glover Pray, in his History of Sunday-Schools, these institutions began to take the form of a voluntary and improved system.

Livermore, having a natural talent and taste for poetic composition, was often called upon to write verses for a variety of occasions. These were never collected and published, though many of them were printed for use in connection with ordination or dedicatory services, or commemorative or festive celebrations. Her Advent hymn, "The Coming of Christ", was considered exceptional. "Hymn of Ordination" was written by Livermore for the ordination of her nephew, Rev. Abiel Abbot Livermore (1811–1892), at Keene, New Hampshire, November 2, 1836; he became the president of the Theological School, Meadville, Pennsylvania) (now, Meadville Lombard Theological School). Two hymns were contributed by her to the Cheshire Pastoral Association's Christian Hymns, 1844: (1) "Glory to God, and peach on earth" (Christmas), and (2) "Our pilgrim brethren, dwelling far" (Missions). She wrote many others, of which two were given in Alfred Porter Putnam's Singers and Songs of the Liberal Faith, 1875.

She belonged to the Unitarian denomination, and like Helen Maria Williams and Anna Laetitia Barbauld, she was evangelical.

She died in Wilton on July 3, 1874. at the age of 84, and was buried in that town's South Yard Cemetery.

== Selected works ==
=== Non-fiction articles ===
- "Industrial Education"

=== Books ===
- Poplars and alders ever quivering play'd, 1825
- History of the town of Wilton [N.H.], 1888

=== Hymns ===
- "Almighty Father, Condescend"
- "Awake, O church, thy strength put on"
- "Father, who of old descended"
- "For the Church at Wilton"
- "Glory to God, and peace on earth"
- "Hymn of Ordination"
- "Our pilgrim brethren dwelling far"
- "The Coming of Christ"
- "The Western Churches"
- "What precept, Jesus, is like thine"

=== Poems ===
- "The Burdock"
