= Daniel Cragin Mill =

- U.S. National Register of Historic Places
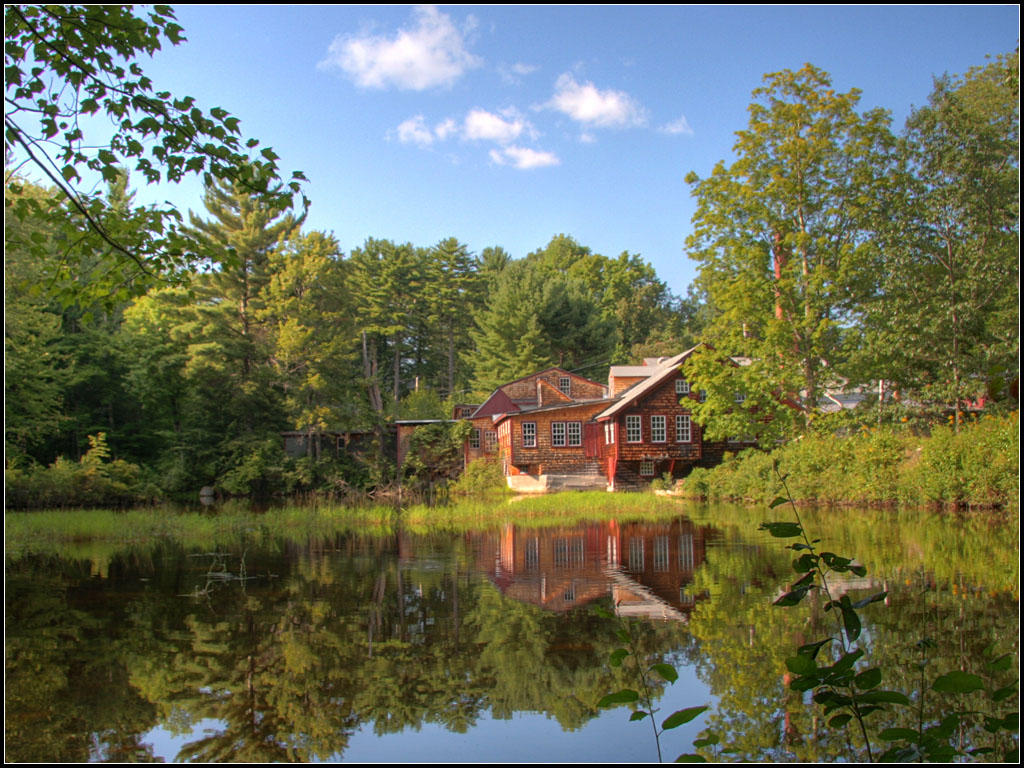
- Water-powered mill

- Location within New Hampshire Location within the United States
- Location: West of town of Wilton at the junction of Davisville Road and Burton Hwy
- Nearest city: Wilton, New Hampshire
- Coordinates: 42°51′22″N 71°47′20″W
- Area: 4 acres (1.6 ha)
- Built: Originally built 1817; Mill founded 1858
- Built by: Eliphalet Putnam, Daniel Cragin, Whitney Frye
- NRHP reference No.: 82001681
- Added to NRHP: March 23, 1982

The Daniel Cragin Mill, known in the twenty-first century as the Frye's Measure Mill, is a historic watermill established in 1858. The mill was added to the U.S. National Register of Historic Places in 1982.

The listing included five contributing buildings on 4 acres (1.6 ha).

== See also ==
- Hamblet-Putnam-Frye House, the Frye's summer residence west of the mill
- National Register of Historic Places listings in Hillsborough County, New Hampshire

== Sources ==
- Adamowicz, Joe, The New Hiking the Monadnock Region: 44 Nature Walks and Day-Hikes in the Heart of New England, Publisher UPNE. Published 2007. ISBN 1-58465-644-1
- Dell'Orto, Michael G. et al., Wilton, Temple, and Lyndeborough, Arcadia Publishing, Published 2003. ISBN 0-7385-1220-6
- Livermore, Abiel Abbot et al., History of the Town of Wilton, Hillsborough County, New Hampshire, Marden & Rowell Printers. Published 1888. Lowell, Massachusetts
