= Milford, New Hampshire =

- Town
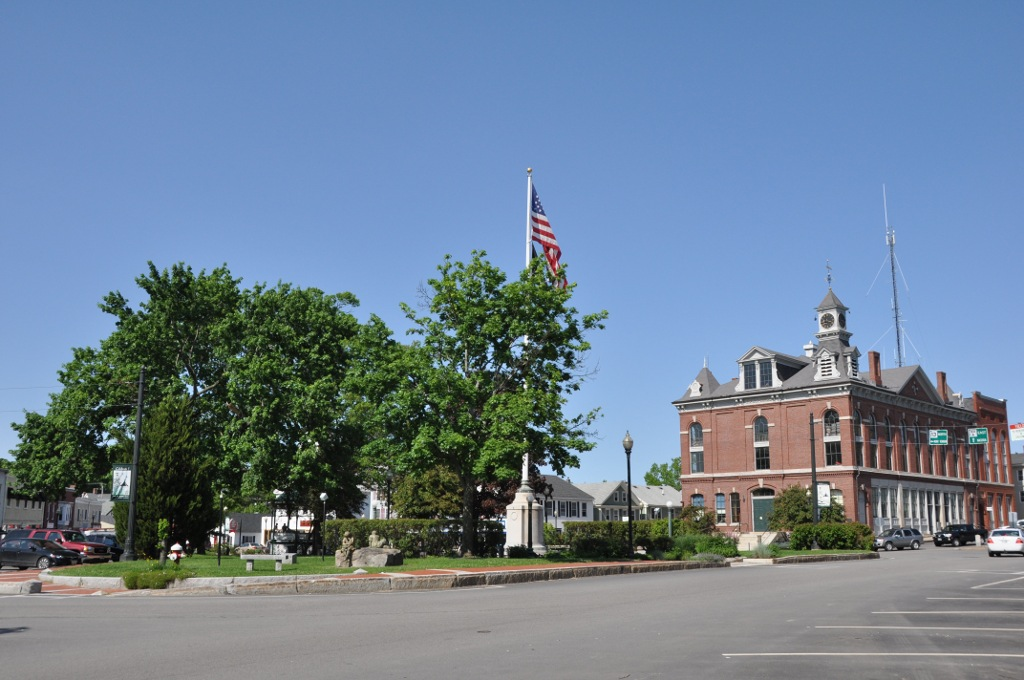
- The center oval and town hall

- Flag Seal

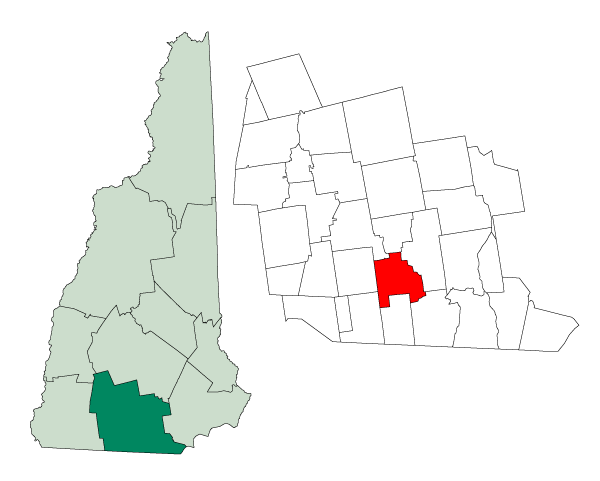
- Location in Hillsborough County, New Hampshire
- Coordinates: 42°48′47″N 71°38′15″W
- Country: United States
- State: New Hampshire
- County: Hillsborough
- Incorporated: 1794

Government
  - Select Board: Gary Daniels, Chair; David Freel; Paul Dargie; Chris Labonte; Tina Philbrick

Area
  - Total: 25.47 sq mi (65.96 km^{2})
  - Land: 25.41 sq mi (65.82 km^{2})
  - Water: 0.054 sq mi (0.14 km^{2}) 0.22%
- Elevation: 308 ft (94 m)

Population (2020)
  - Total: 16,131
  - Density: 635/sq mi (245.1/km^{2})
- Time zone: UTC-5 (Eastern)
  - Summer (DST): UTC-4 (Eastern)
- ZIP code: 03055
- Area code: 603
- FIPS code: 33-48020
- GNIS feature ID: 873666
- Website: www.milford.nh.gov

Milford is a town in Hillsborough County, New Hampshire, United States, on the Souhegan River. The population was 16,131 at the 2020 census, up from 15,115 at the 2010 census. It is the retail and manufacturing center of a multi-town area known informally as the Souhegan Valley.

The town center, where 9,212 people lived at the 2020 census, is defined as the Milford census-designated place (CDP), and is located at the junction of New Hampshire routes 13 and 101A. It also contains part of the census-designated place of Wilton.

== History ==
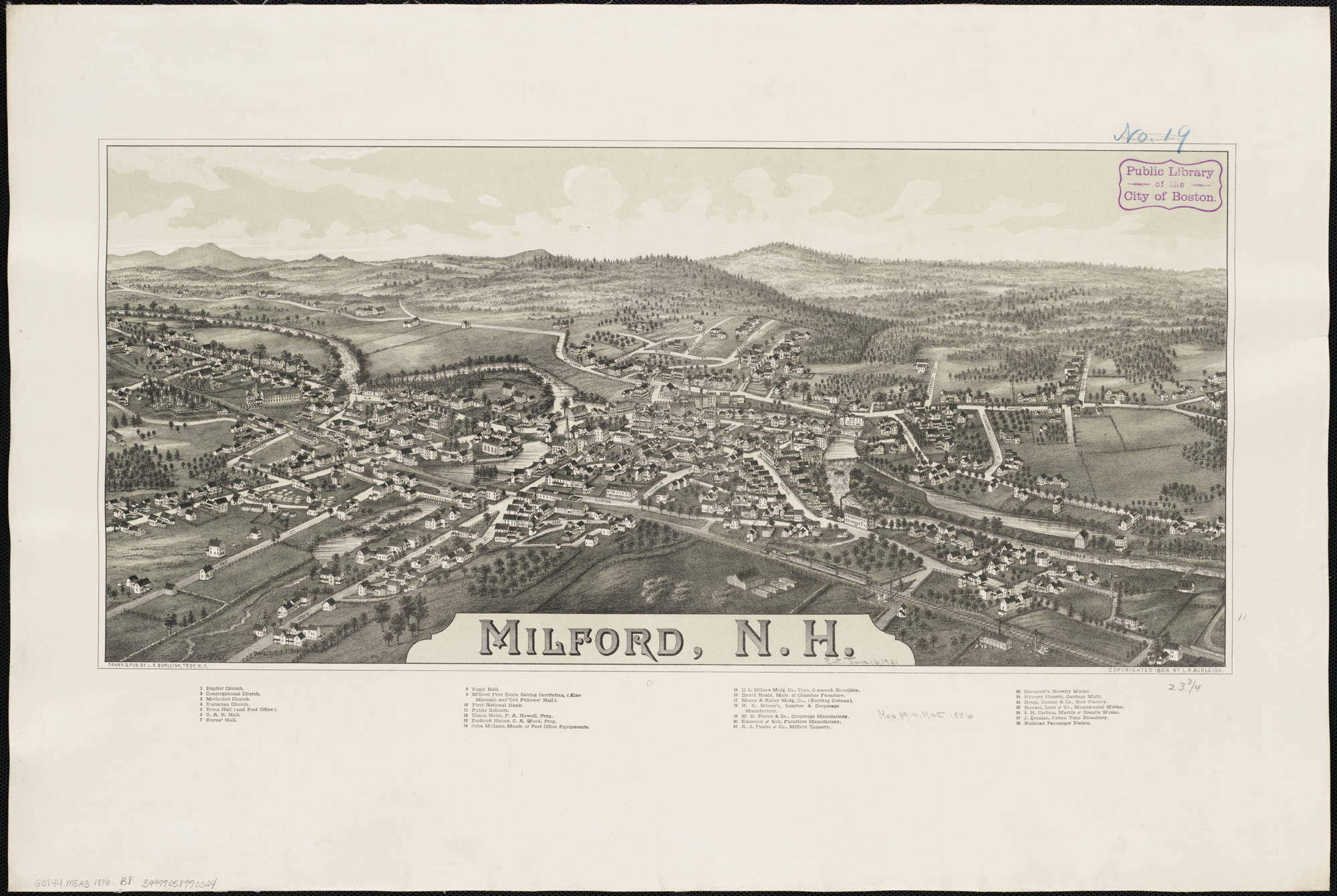
Lithograph of Milford from 1886 by L.R. Burleigh with list of landmarks

Milford separated from neighboring Amherst in 1794. Like most towns named Milford in the United States, its name comes from the fact that it grew around a mill built on a ford—in this case on the Souhegan River.

Milford was once home to numerous granite quarries, which produced a stone that was used, among other things, to make the pillars for the U.S. Treasury in Washington, D.C. —as seen on the back of the American $10 bill. Its nickname remains "The Granite Town", although only one small quarry is in operation as of 2017.

Like many New England riverside towns, Milford developed several thriving textile mills in the 19th century. That industry left New England by World War II, but Milford remains the commercial and retail center for surrounding towns. Major employers included casting company Hitchiner Manufacturing Co., a metal cable manufacturer, Hendrix Wire and Cable Inc., and a contract manufacturing solutions company, Cirtronics Corporation. In 2018, local firm Alene Candles became one of the first companies in the state to implement a "conscious leadership" program in a manufacturing production setting.

Milford is home to the Milford State Fish Hatchery. The town also holds the Souhegan Valley Boys & Girls Club, built on the former home of the now-bankrupt private theater American Stage Festival.

Milford was a stop on the Underground Railroad for escaped slaves. It was also the home of Harriet E. Wilson, who published the semi-autobiographical novel Our Nig: Or, Sketches in the Life of a Free Black in 1859, making it the first novel by an African-American woman published in the country.

Officially designated "Union Square", the Milford Oval is neither square nor oval in shape; rather, it is triangular. The "square" name in American parlance denotes a town common irrespective of geometry, and the "oval" name dates from the 19th century, when it was oval in shape. The Oval is the town center, with the Pillsbury Bandstand as its centerpiece and the Souhegan River as the backdrop. The Oval is formed by a modified traffic rotary in which State Highways 13 and 101A intersect, with northbound 13 and eastbound 101A passing straight through and crossing each other at a right angle with a stop sign for traffic on Route 13.

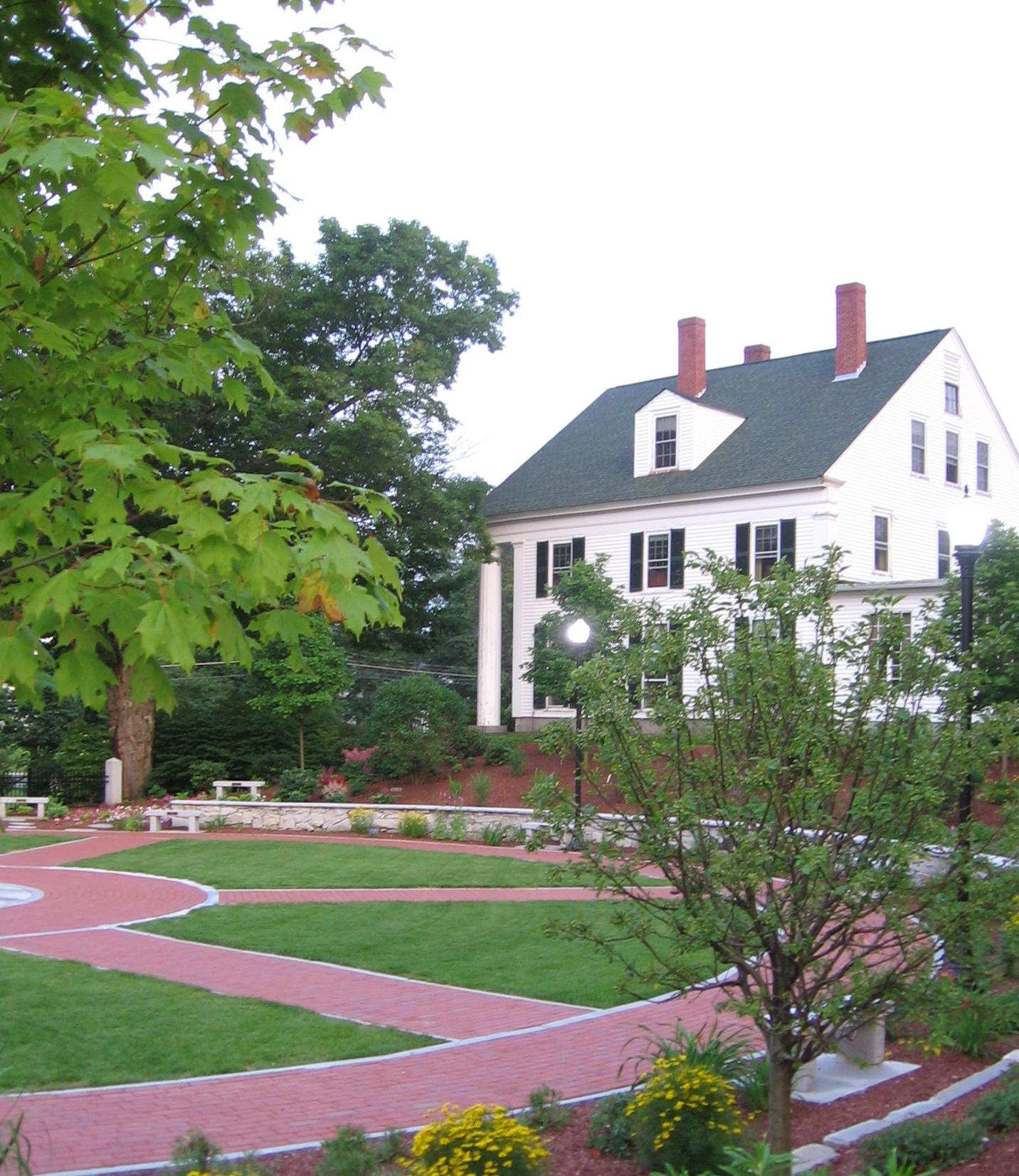
Centennial Park

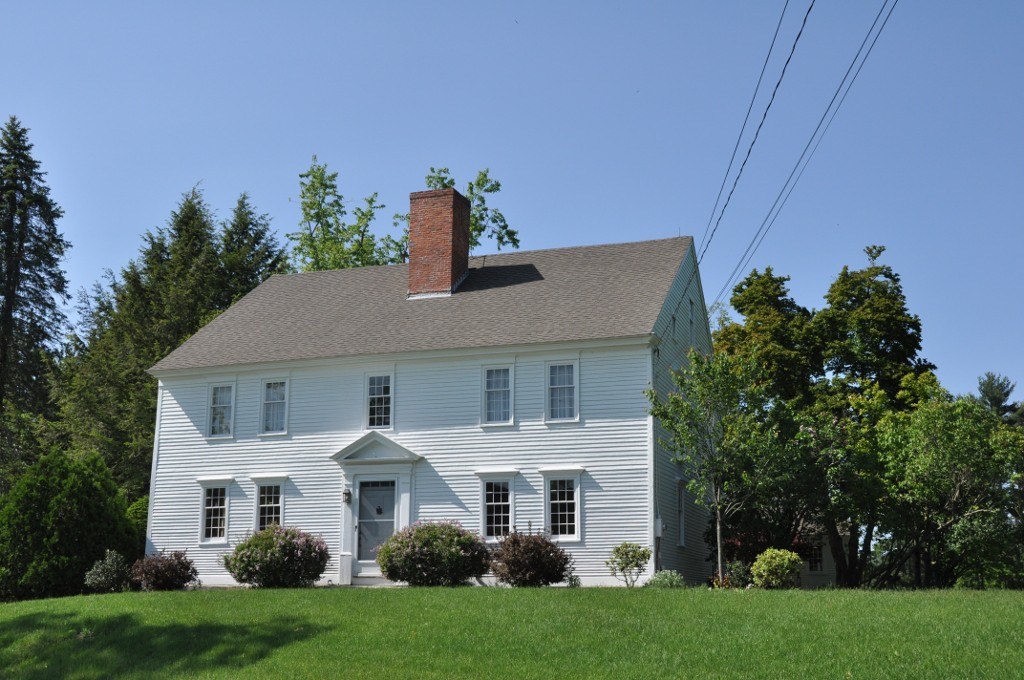
William Peabody House

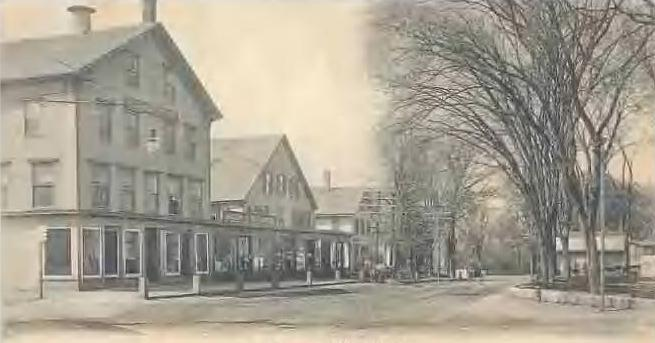
Union Square c. 1905

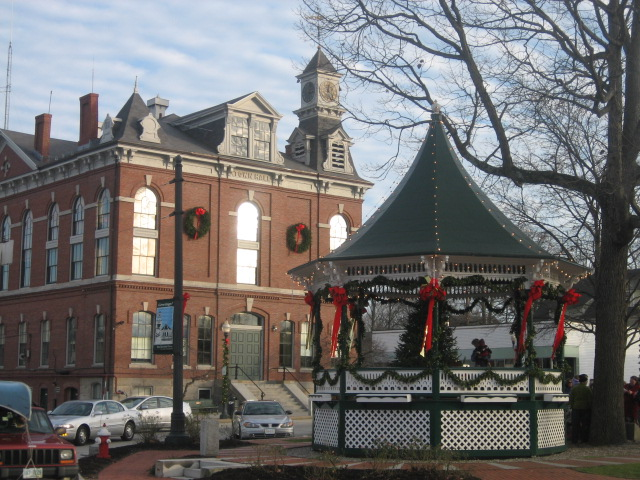
Union Square in 2006

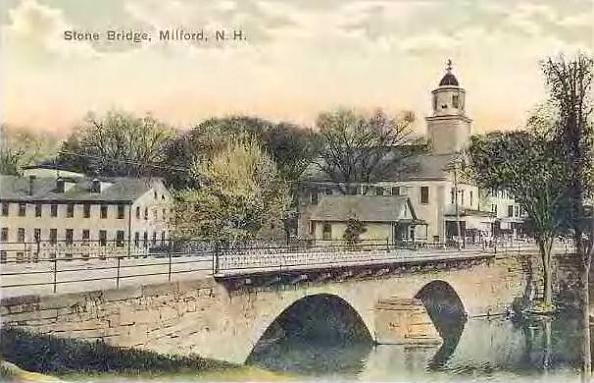
Stone Bridge c. 1905

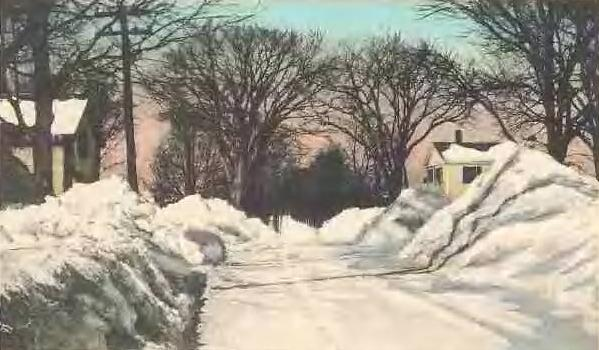
Elm Street c. 1915

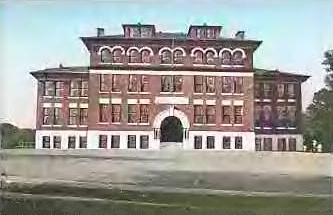
Centennial High School c. 1905

== Geography ==
Milford is in southern New Hampshire and south-central Hillsborough County. It is 20 miles (32 km) southwest of Manchester, the largest city in the state, and 14 miles (23 km) northwest of Nashua.

According to the United States Census Bureau, the town has a total area of 25.5 square miles (66.0 km^{2}), of which 25.4 square miles (65.8 km^{2}) are land and 0.04 square miles (0.1 km^{2}) are water, comprising 0.22% of the town. Milford is drained by the Souhegan River, an eastward-flowing tributary of the Merrimack River. The southwestern part of town is drained by Mitchell Brook and Spaulding Brook, which flow south into Brookline and are part of the Nashua River watershed, another tributary of the Merrimack. The town's highest point is near its western border, on the summit of Boynton Hill; it is 814 feet (248 m) above sea level.

=== Adjacent municipalities ===
- Lyndeborough (north)
- Mont Vernon (north)
- Amherst (east)
- Hollis (southeast)
- Brookline (south)
- Mason (southwest)
- Wilton (west)

=== Climate ===
According to the Köppen Climate Classification system, Milford has a hot-summer humid continental climate, abbreviated "Dfa" on climate maps. The hottest temperature recorded in Milford was 101 °F (38.3 °C) in July 2011, while the coldest temperature recorded was −21 °F (−29.4 °C) in January 1994.

Climate data for Milford, New Hampshire, 1991–2020 normals, extremes 1950–present
Month	Jan	Feb	Mar	Apr	May	Jun	Jul	Aug	Sep	Oct	Nov	Dec	Year
Record high °F (°C)	69 (21)	76 (24)	88 (31)	95 (35)	95 (35)	99 (37)	101 (38)	100 (38)	96 (36)	87 (31)	77 (25)	71 (22)	101 (38)
Mean maximum °F (°C)	54.6 (12.6)	56.2 (13.4)	66.2 (19.0)	80.9 (27.2)	88.3 (31.3)	92.1 (33.4)	93.4 (34.1)	91.7 (33.2)	87.7 (30.9)	77.6 (25.3)	68.0 (20.0)	57.6 (14.2)	95.2 (35.1)
Mean daily maximum °F (°C)	33.2 (0.7)	36.2 (2.3)	44.6 (7.0)	58.3 (14.6)	69.2 (20.7)	77.5 (25.3)	83.4 (28.6)	81.2 (27.3)	72.7 (22.6)	60.4 (15.8)	48.9 (9.4)	38.1 (3.4)	58.6 (14.8)
Daily mean °F (°C)	23.7 (−4.6)	25.6 (−3.6)	34.0 (1.1)	46.3 (7.9)	57.0 (13.9)	66.1 (18.9)	71.8 (22.1)	69.4 (20.8)	61.3 (16.3)	49.0 (9.4)	38.6 (3.7)	29.1 (−1.6)	47.7 (8.7)
Mean daily minimum °F (°C)	14.3 (−9.8)	14.9 (−9.5)	23.5 (−4.7)	34.3 (1.3)	44.9 (7.2)	54.8 (12.7)	60.1 (15.6)	57.6 (14.2)	50.0 (10.0)	37.7 (3.2)	28.4 (−2.0)	20.0 (−6.7)	36.7 (2.6)
Mean minimum °F (°C)	−5.1 (−20.6)	−2.6 (−19.2)	4.4 (−15.3)	22.3 (−5.4)	31.8 (−0.1)	41.9 (5.5)	49.8 (9.9)	46.6 (8.1)	35.0 (1.7)	24.7 (−4.1)	15.0 (−9.4)	3.4 (−15.9)	−8.3 (−22.4)
Record low °F (°C)	−11 (−24)	−16 (−27)	−6 (−21)	11 (−12)	26 (−3)	34 (1)	43 (6)	41 (5)	25 (−4)	17 (−8)	7 (−14)	−9 (−23)	−16 (−27)
Average precipitation inches (mm)	3.03 (77)	2.99 (76)	3.79 (96)	4.15 (105)	3.35 (85)	4.03 (102)	3.73 (95)	3.68 (93)	4.04 (103)	4.88 (124)	3.92 (100)	4.45 (113)	46.04 (1,169)
Average snowfall inches (cm)	15.4 (39)	11.5 (29)	14.4 (37)	2.3 (5.8)	0.0 (0.0)	0.0 (0.0)	0.0 (0.0)	0.0 (0.0)	0.0 (0.0)	0.1 (0.25)	1.1 (2.8)	12.6 (32)	57.4 (145.85)
Average precipitation days (≥ 0.01 in)	11.2	8.8	11.1	11.8	13.6	12.1	11.1	10.9	10.5	10.2	11.4	11.1	133.8
Average snowy days (≥ 0.1 in)	7.1	6.1	5.4	1.0	0.0	0.0	0.0	0.0	0.0	0.1	1.4	5.2	26.3
Source 1: NOAA
Source 2: National Weather Service

== Demographics ==
Historical population
Census	Pop.	Note	%±
1800	939		—
1810	1,117		19.0%
1820	1,243		11.3%
1830	1,303		4.8%
1840	1,455		11.7%
1850	2,159		48.4%
1860	2,223		3.0%
1870	2,606		17.2%
1880	2,308		−11.4%
1890	3,014		30.6%
1900	3,739		24.1%
1910	3,939		5.3%
1920	3,783		−4.0%
1930	4,068		7.5%
1940	3,927		−3.5%
1950	4,159		5.9%
1960	4,863		16.9%
1970	6,622		36.2%
1980	8,685		31.2%
1990	11,795		35.8%
2000	13,535		14.8%
2010	15,115		11.7%
2020	16,131		6.7%
2024 (est.)	16,530		2.5%
U.S. Decennial Census

As of the census of 2010, there were 15,115 people, 5,929 households, and 4,004 families residing in the town. There were 6,295 housing units, of which 366, or 5.8%, were vacant. The racial makeup of the town was 94.8% white, 1.3% African American, 0.2% Native American, 1.3% Asian, 0.01% Native Hawaiian or Pacific Islander, 0.6% some other race, and 1.7% from two or more races. 2.2% of the population were Hispanic or Latino of any race.

Of the 5,929 households, 35.7% had children under the age of 18 living with them, 52.0% were headed by married couples living together, 10.5% had a female householder with no husband present, and 32.5% were non-families. 25.3% of all households were made up of individuals, and 9.4% were someone living alone who was 65 years of age or older. The average household size was 2.53, and the average family size was 3.04.

In the town, 25.0% of the population was under the age of 18, 7.8% was from 18 to 24, 27.0% from 25 to 44, 28.3% from 45 to 64, and 11.9% were 65 years of age or older. The median age was 39.0 years. For every 100 females, there were 95.8 males. For every 100 females aged 18 and over, there were 93.3 males.

For the period 2011–2015, the estimated median annual income for a household was $64,576, and the median income for a family was $80,241. Male full-time workers had a median income of $55,313 versus $38,792 for females. The per capita income for the town was $32,918. 5.8% of the population and 3.7% of families were below the poverty line. 8.2% of the population under the age of 18 and 2.7% of those 65 or older were living in poverty.

== Education ==
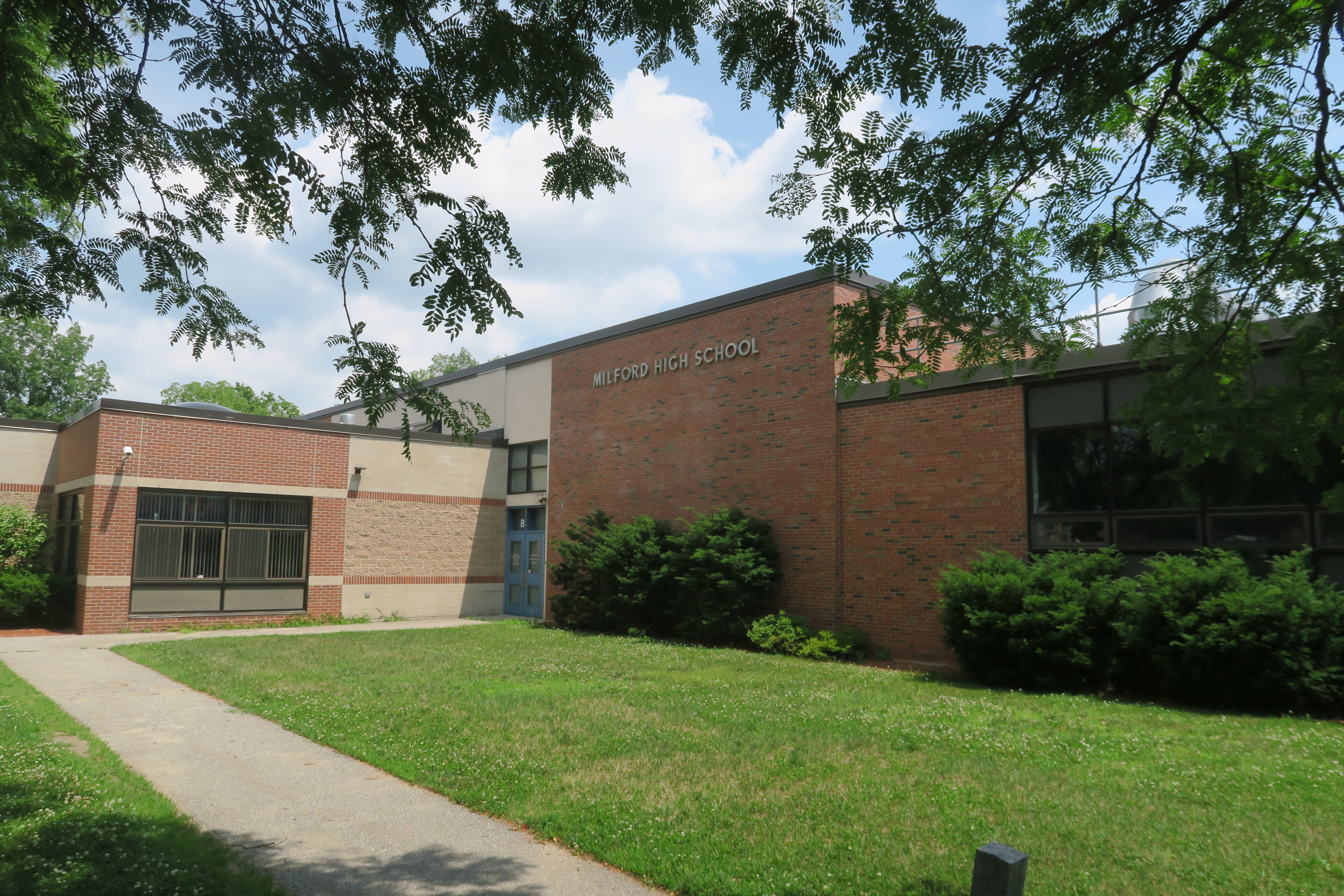
Milford High School & Applied Technology Center

The Milford School District operates Jacques Memorial School (K-1), Heron Pond Elementary School (2–5), Milford Middle School (6–8), and Milford High School & Applied Technology Center (9–12).

== Culture ==
The town is known for its "Pumpkin Festival", which is normally held in early October. It is held over a three-day weekend (Friday-Sunday) and attracts more than 35,000 people. The festival has many attractions including food vendors, music stages, craft fair, carved pumpkin lighting, a haunted trail, a beer and wine tasting and a fireworks display around the Oval.

== Notable people ==
- Linda Kasabian (1949–2023), former Manson Family member
- John McLane (1852–1911), 50th governor of New Hampshire, from 1905 to 1907
- Lizette Emma Orth (1858–1913), composer of children's music and operas
- Abby Hutchinson Patton (1829–1892), 19th-century singer, poet
- Bernice Blake Perry (1905–1996), the first woman in New Hampshire to earn a pilot's license
- George A. Ramsdell (1834–1900), 46th governor of New Hampshire
- Fritz Wetherbee (born 1936), television host and journalist; raised in Milford
- Harriet E. Wilson (1825–1900), considered the first female African-American novelist

== See also ==
- New Hampshire Historical Marker No. 133: Captain Josiah Crosby (1730–1793) Lieutenant Thompson Maxwell (1742–1832)
- New Hampshire Historical Marker No. 268: Bernice Blake Perry (1905–1996)
