= Citizens' Hall =

- U.S. National Register of Historic Places
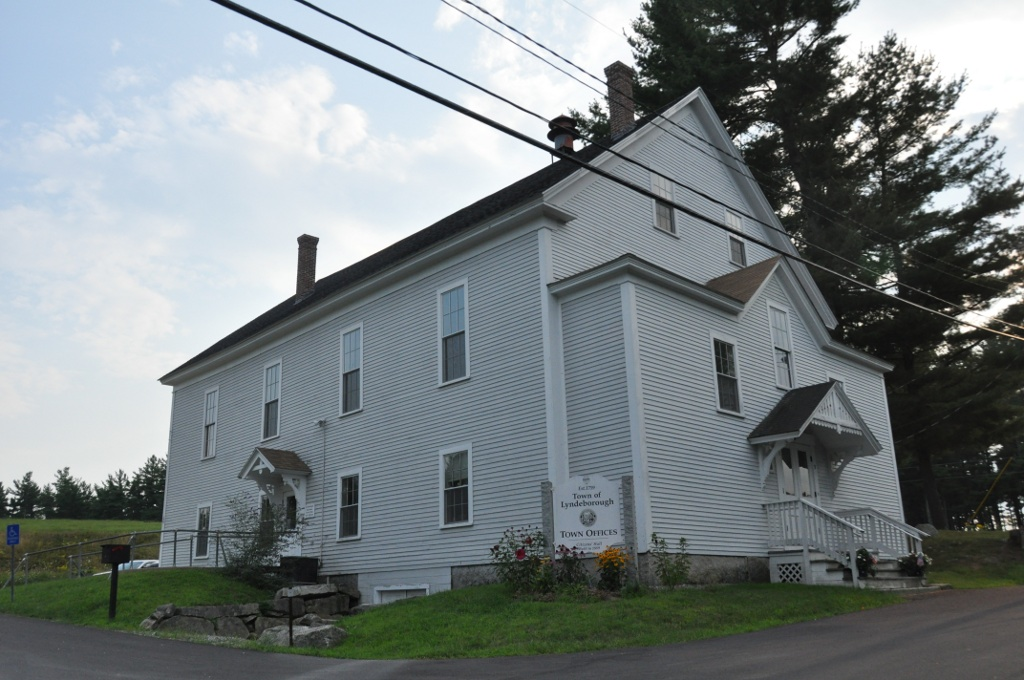

- Location within New Hampshire Location within the United States
- Location: Lyndeborough, New Hampshire
- Coordinates: 42°52′44.35″N 71°47′4.73″W
- Architect: Lafayette Artillery Company
- Architectural style: Stick/Eastlake
- NRHP reference No.: 99001482
- Added to NRHP: December 9, 1999

Citizens' Hall is the government office building and a community meeting place for the town of Lyndeborough, New Hampshire. Built in 1889 in the Stick–Eastlake Style, but one that is also heavily influenced by the Greek Revival, it is listed on the National Register of Historic Places for its importance as a community/social center for the town. It is located on Citizens' Hall Road in the village of South Lyndeborough.

== Origins ==
Citizens' Hall was constructed by the Town of Lyndeborough between September 1888 and January 1889 to house the Lafayette Artillery Company's armory and its annual February 22 Levee and Ball. Started in 1877, the Levee and Ball had become the town's most anticipated event, bringing hundreds of guests into the community. By 1888 the event had grown too large to be hosted by South Lyndeborough's three major events facilities, the Baptist Church, Tarbell's Hall (above Tarbell's Store), and Artillery Hall (above the depot). Therefore, the Lafayette Artillery raised $275 and purchased part of an apple orchard occupying a high point in the village along the road to Temple (now Citizens' Hall Road) with the intention of constructing a new headquarters and social facility.

However, the Artillery was unable to raise the funds to construct a headquarters. Therefore, the group petitioned the town to build the structure for it. At a town meeting in March 1888, after much discussion, the town voted in favor of spending $2,000 on the new building, but only if the structure would serve the community as a whole. The Artillery agreed to rent space in the building for its office and armory, and the town also voted to set aside space for a town library. (For some unknown reason, the library never was housed in Citizens' Hall despite the vote.)

Over the course of the next several months, construction of what would become Citizens' Hall was delayed as a group of townspeople petitioned the Hillsborough County Superior Court to overturn the town's March vote. When their petition was denied, the group was able to call a special town meeting to reconsider the issue. In September, after another lengthy discussion, the town voted to table the articles before them, and within days a granite foundation had been set in place.

== Plan and construction ==
During the summer prior to construction, the Citizens' Hall building committee—composed of Civil War veterans and local politicians Jason Holt, B.G. Herrick, and Fred Richardson, as well as Lafayette Artillery members Andy Holt and Charles Henry Holt—designed a simple structure resembling the nearby Baptist Church. Like the church, the main body was designed in the Classical Revival style, with its pediment facing the road. The facade, however, was designed in the then-current Eastlakes/Stick style, a popular Victorian architectural style which originated in upstate New York. The facade includes a cross-gabled hip roof, and the front porch a decorative truss and diagonal support braces typical of this style.

After the town approved the project in September 1888, work proceeded rapidly on the structure. Artillery member D. C. Grant, through his company D. C. Grant and Sons, headed the construction effort, and the town purchased building materials from Whiting and Sons and other companies in nearby Wilton, New Hampshire. As a result, portions of the structure are vaguely similar to features on a storefront (now used as a restaurant) and an adjacent house on Wilton's Main Street.

People entering the building through the main (north) entrance were met with a floor plan that featured two staircases on either side of the entrance, both of which led to the second-floor grand hall. The first-floor lobby included a ticket window on the east wall, behind which was the Artillery's meeting room; as well as another small pass-through opening to the "clothes room" (or "cloak room") behind the west wall. The pine trim was painted an off-white color, in contrast to the medium-grey plaster walls, and the wainscotting and plank floor were stained brown.

Beyond the front hallway was the banquet hall, the walls of which were lined in horizontal painted wooden boards. In the southwest corner was the armory, where the Artillery kept its munitions and uniforms, while in the southeast corner was the kitchen (although this room remained unfinished until 1890). A passageway between the two rooms led to the connected outhouse, or "backhouse."

In the kitchen was another staircase, this one leading to the stage area in the second floor hall. North of the stage was the ballroom, with its 14-foot ceiling and large windows. Patrons accessed the second floor of the backhouse as well as the attic stairs from the backstage area.

On January 5, 1889, the Artillery held its first meeting in the not-yet-completed building. Ten days later, former Artillery captain Joel Tarbell and his wife, Esther, held the first public event in the hall's history: their golden wedding anniversary. Sixteen days later, the Artillery and the town formally dedicated the building. Although "Union Hall" had been mentioned as a possible name for the structure, "Citizens' Hall" appears to have been chosen to emphasize that the building belonged to the community, not only to the Civil War veterans and Artillery members who asked that it be built. The first February 22 Levee and Ball to be hosted in the building was held on February 22, 1889.

== 1889-1997 ==
In its early years, Citizens' Hall was used as the primary social-gathering site in South Lyndeborough. The Lafayette Artillery held drills in the ballroom and dinners in the dining room, and stored most of its arms on-site. (The group's 1844 brass cannon was kept in a shed adjacent to Citizens' Hall.) The group also hosted public events, including the annual Washington's Birthday Levee and Ball, until after World War II. On the occasion of the annual ball, Artillery members would erect a 50-foot flagpole atop Citizens' Hall, from which they would fly the company flag.

The Town of Lyndeborough appropriated money to complete the interior of the building in the early 1890s, and in 1910 purchased a pressed-tin ceiling for the ballroom. In the 1920s, when South Lyndeborough received electricity, the Artillery paid to have the building wired, and purchased new electric light fixtures to replace the old gas lamps. The original gas lamp above the front entrance to the building was wired and re-used as an electric light. The 1920s electric lights, as well as the lamp above the front doors, are still in use as of December 2009, and are considered essential elements of the building's historic value.

In the late nineteenth and early twentieth centuries, the Artillery shared Citizens' Hall with the Grand Army of the Republic's Harvey Holt Post. The GAR was responsible for introducing Memorial Day celebrations into Lyndeborough, and Citizens' Hall played an important role in the annual occasion. (The Artillery began organizing the event in the 1930s.) The post also procured a cannon which had been used at Fort Constitution in Portsmouth, New Hampshire, during the Civil War. This naval cannon, named the Hartshorn Memorial Cannon for former Artillery member and Civil War casualty John Alonzo Hartshorn (pronounced HARTS-horn), was placed in front of Citizens' Hall in 1902. In 1934, by town vote, it was removed to the South Lyndeborough common, and in 2009, amidst some controversy, it was moved to Lyndeborough Center. Although the cannon remains in Lyndeborough, technically it is on loan from the federal government.

By the 1950s, as interest in the Lafayette Artillery Company ebbed and the Washington's Birthday celebration ceased as an annual event, the condition of Citizens' Hall declined. Occasionally the town would spend money to repair the structure, as in the 1950s when the Board of Selectmen voted to purchase new windows, replace sills, and add a second-floor fire-escape door to the building. Finally, in the mid-1960s the town's population—which had more than doubled since 1930—necessitated the movement of the annual Town Meeting from the old town hall at Lyndeborough Center to Citizens' Hall. Subsequently, the Board of Selectmen, Police Department, and other town agencies also moved into the building. A $20,000 renovation—utilizing volunteer labor—resulted in the construction of bathrooms, the introduction of a heating unit, and moderately better insulation for the building, but much of Citizens' Hall's charm was covered or painted over. Neglect of the building continued into the 1990s, by which time the town was faced with the question of whether to build a new town hall or more properly renovate Citizens' Hall.

== Renovation of 1998-2000 ==
By the 1990s, Citizens’ Hall was in severe disrepair. In 1988 the second-floor hall was closed to public functions because of possible structural and fire hazards. The police department made the space its own for a few years, during which time the ballroom deteriorated further. Rust spots became noticeable on the ceiling, the floor became worn under the desks and chairs of department personnel, and artifacts were screwed, taped, or otherwise affixed to the plaster walls and wood wainscoting. The first floor looked even worse, as the Board of Selectmen made a decision to forego basic maintenance in an effort to persuade the town to vote on the building's future.

Initially, the Selectmen and the town supported a renovation project that included digging out the basement of the building for use as storage space and, perhaps, a police department. That plan was abandoned, however, when workers came upon a natural spring beneath the building. Making matters worse, the Fire Marshal threatened to close the building if Citizens’ Hall was not brought up to code, and a Nashua architect suggested that the town would be better off constructing a new town office building.

In 1998, after several years of disagreement between the Lyndeborough Board of Selectmen and the town's Budget Committee, the town was asked to vote on two plans: one to renovate Citizens’ Hall for $263,885, or build a new town hall on donated land outside the historic district at Lyndeborough Center for $327,500. A third plan, offered by budget committee members Wayne Fullerton and Burton Reynolds, involved the allocation of $186,600 to renovate the first floor of Citizens’ Hall and address the building's major structural problems. In presenting the plan, the budget committee members admitted that the renovation would not address all of the town's immediate needs, but would be “better than what we have.” The plan also assumed that volunteers would step forward to keep the costs of renovation down. After about eight hours of discussion, the town voted for the $186,600 plan.

To oversee the renovation, the Board of Selectmen appointed a building committee consisting of builder Phil Brooks, former selectman Bill Stephenson, and three other local residents. However, as the interest of the three others waned, Brooks brought other members aboard: Lafayette Artillery members Walter Holland and Edna Worcester; historian and lifelong resident Stephanie Abbot Roper; geographer Scott Roper; and carpenter, lifelong resident, and Artillery member Walter Holt. Brooks, who contributed tremendous amounts of time and materials to the project, coordinated volunteer efforts with Worcester, while Holland and Holt initiated the demolition and construction stages of the renovation. Stephanie and Scott Roper researched the building's historic features, determining which features of the building should be preserved or restored, and spent considerable time restoring the foyer wainscoting to its original, stained (not painted) appearance. Scott Roper, who with Phil Brooks served as the group's unofficial media liaison, worked with the New Hampshire Division of Historic Resources to determine the building's historical significance, and eventually wrote the nomination form that led to the building being placed on the National Register of Historic Places in December, 1999.

Over eighteen months, with the help of local architect Ron Ravenscroft and more than eighty volunteers, not including several local contractors who worked voluntarily at below-market wages, the town completed the renovation of Citizens' Hall. The front hallway, stairs, and second-floor hall, as well as the building's façade, were identified as the building's most important historic features, and were restored as best as possible to their 1920s appearance. The former clothes room became the Selectmen's Office, and the former Lafayette Artillery office—later a police department office—was enlarged as the office of the town clerk and tax collector. The former kitchen was expanded and made into the Police Department office, while the former dining hall was made smaller and turned into a meeting room and two offices for the Selectmen. The beaded board formerly on the walls of the dining hall was cut and turned into wainscoting (with a new chair rail to match the original chair rail in the front hallway), and the dining room's original pine floor was refinished and made a key feature of the new meeting room.

The use of volunteers saved so much money that the committee was able to renovate the second floor, so that it could be used for public functions again. On February 22, 2000, the Lafayette Artillery held its first Washington's Birthday celebration in nearly a half-century to celebrate the completion of the renovation, and in March the town held its first Town Meeting in the building since the mid-1980s. A year later, volunteers received citations from then-New Hampshire Governor Jeanne Shaheen for their work.

The renovation also was significant for those who took part in it. Renovation Committee member Walter Holland was elected first to a position on the town Budget Committee, and subsequently to that of Town Moderator. Stephanie Roper became a Budget Committee member and, later, Supervisor of the Checklist. Scott Roper was elected to the Board of Selectmen in 1999 and reelected in 2002. Several others who took part in the renovation also were elected or appointed to positions in town government once the project was completed.

== Since 2000 ==
Since 2000, Citizens' Hall has been more appreciated by local residents. In 2002, the Board of Selectmen voted to paint Citizens' Hall—which previously always had been white—a light grey color to contrast with the building's white trim. The board hoped to convey the building's architectural importance to the town by emphasizing the nineteenth-century stickwork and trim that few who use the building notice.

Today, Citizens' Hall continues to be used for social functions. The Artillery's Washington's Birthday celebration was observed annually each February from 2000 through 2007, and the building occasionally is used for town meetings and other community events. Additionally, the meetings of the town Budget Committee, Emergency Planning Committee, Conservation Commission, Planning Board, Zoning Board of Adjustment, and Selectmen, not to mention the offices of the Town Treasurer, Town Clerk/Tax Collector, Building Inspector, and Police Department, are located in Citizens' Hall.

== Bibliography ==
- D. Donovan; Jacob Woodward (1906). The History of the Town of Lyndeborough, New Hampshire, 1735-1905. H. W. Whittemore and Co.
- Scott C. Roper (2000). Citizens' Hall: A History of Lyndeborough's "Other" Town Hall, 1888-2000. Lyndeborough, NH: Hadley Pond Press.
- Stephanie Abbot Roper; Scott C. Roper (2004). Citizen Soldiers: New Hampshire's Lafayette Artillery Company, 1804-2004. Portsmouth, NH: Peter E. Randall.
