= Hartshorn Memorial Cannon =

American Civil War naval cannon

Coordinates: 42°52′46″N 71°46′59″W

The Hartshorn Cannon and war memorials on the South Lyndeborough village common, April 2010. The blue house on the right is believed to have been J. Alonzo Hartshorn's family home.

The Hartshorn Memorial Cannon is a decommissioned American Civil War naval cannon that forms the centerpiece of the South Lyndeborough Village Common in Lyndeborough, New Hampshire. The cannon is named for John Alonzo Hartshorn, the town's second Civil War casualty and a former member of the town's Lafayette Artillery Company.

== Description ==
Prior to 1900, the Hartshorn Cannon saw service as a naval piece during the Civil War at Fort Constitution in New Castle, New Hampshire, and is believed to have remained there until substantial changes were made to the fort in the late 1890s. The black thirty-pounder Parrott rifle is approximately 102 inches (2,600 mm) long, weighs 3,495 pounds (1,585 kg), and was made at West Point Foundry in New York. Currently it sits on a low granite base which probably dates from about 1902. When in use, it was capable of firing 29-pound (13 kg) shells with a munition charge of 3.25 pounds (1.47 kg) a maximum distance of 6,700 yards (6,100 m), with a flight time of 27 seconds. Typically, nine people were required to operate it. The Hartshorn Cannon's use as a naval gun is suggested by an anchor insignia inscribed near the base of its barrel. Inscribed on the cannon is the letter-number combination "R.P.P. No. 140 3495 LBS," probably indicating the inventor (New Hampshire native Robert Parker Parrott), order of manufacture, and weight of the cannon. Additionally, the year of manufacture (1862) and classification ("30 PDR") are indicated on one side of the gun, and the initial "P" is engraved on the other.

== The cannon and the Grand Army of the Republic ==
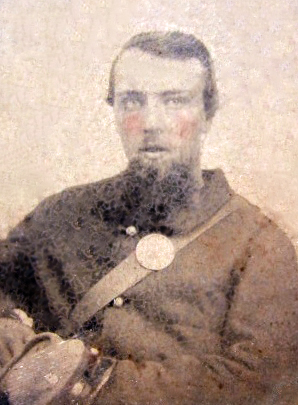
John Alonzo Hartshorn

In 1900, the United States War Department offered Lyndeborough's Harvey Holt Post of the Grand Army of the Republic a cannon to place near its local headquarters, Citizens' Hall, with the stipulation that the gift be considered a loan. The GAR post petitioned the town to allow it to grade a spot on which to place the cannon, and the town granted permission for it to do so on March 14, 1900. The post received the cannon in 1902. That year, at a dinner attended by more than 200 people at Citizens' Hall, the GAR dedicated the artillery piece to the memory of John Alonzo Hartshorn.

Hartshorn (pronounced HARTS-hurn, though New Englanders in this region usually pronounce it "HAHTZ-hun") was born on July 14, 1840, to Susannah Putnam Hartshorn (1816–1903) and her husband, John Hartshorn (1811–1878), a deacon in the Baptist Church. The younger Hartshorn grew up in South Lyndeborough in a house at the corner of what today is Citizens' Hall Road and Forest Road/Route 31. On May 20, 1861, he enlisted in the 2nd New Hampshire Volunteer Regiment, infantry division, and served as part of the Army of the Potomac in Virginia. On May 5, 1862, Hartshorn was killed during the Battle of Williamsburg in Virginia, becoming the second Lyndeborough resident to die in the Civil War. Harvey Holt, the namesake for the GAR post, was the town's—and according to Lyndeborough's official town history, state's—first Civil War fatality, having perished during the First Battle of Bull Run.

== The cannon and the South Lyndeborough Common ==
By 1934, all of Lyndeborough's Civil War veterans had died, and the Harvey Holt Post had ceased to exist. Meanwhile, changes were coming to South Lyndeborough. In 1914, the local improvement society redeveloped a central plot of land near the depot into a village common. By 1933, the state had taken over control of Forest Road and turned it into State Route 31, a move which promised to significantly increase automobile traffic in the small town of 399 people. Yet the paving of Route 31 in 1933 also disrupted the common, tearing up shrubs and grass and bringing about a greater awareness of the common's prominent location among local voters. Therefore, as part of an effort to improve the village green, in 1934 the town voted to move the Hartshorn Memorial Cannon to the common—coincidentally, to a location viewable from both Alonzo Hartshorn's childhood home and his church. In carrying out the voters' wishes, however, the town accidentally placed the cannon within the state's Route 31 right-of-way.

In the early 1980s, Route 31 was widened, as a result of which the Hartshorn Cannon saw increased damage from winter plowing and salt use on the roadways. Therefore, in 2009, amidst some controversy, an unknown person or people moved the cannon to what the Board of Selectmen eventually termed a "temporary location" in the Lyndeborough Center Historic District, some three miles away. With the endorsement of the local newspaper, the Milford Cabinet, the Selectmen appointed a committee of local experts to find a permanent location for the cannon, two additional war monuments, and a new Vietnam Memorial. This committee consisted of seven people who together included the Town Moderator, two Lafayette Artillery members, three Vietnam War-era veterans (including one combat veteran), two former selectmen, two college professors, and three lifelong residents of the town. In April 2010, citing the desire to maintain the historic integrity of the Lyndeborough Center Historic District as well as South Lyndeborough, the group decided to place the memorials on the South Lyndeborough Village Common. The Hartshorn Cannon was moved back to the common (to a new location away from the road) in May 2010, and the cannon was a center of focus in the town's 2010 Memorial Day ceremonies.

On August 21, 2010, the Monuments Committee unveiled a $30,000 plan for the South Lyndeborough common, which includes a redevelopment of the spot with fencing, trees, granite benches, walkways, and a Vietnam monument, as well as a new base for the Hartshorn Cannon. Sale of personalized bricks for the walkway and other fundraising ventures will finance the redevelopment.

== Sources ==
- D. Donovan and J.A. Woodward, The History of Lyndeborough, New Hampshire, 1735-1905 (Boston: Tufts, 1906).
- N. Martin, "Who Moved Lyndeborough Monuments?" Ledger-Transcript (Peterborough NH) November 2009
- "Local Issue, But..." The Cabinet (Milford NH) January 21, 2010,
- Lyndeborough, New Hampshire, town web site
- S.A. Roper and S.C. Roper, Citizen Soldiers: New Hampshire's Lafayette Artillery Company, 1804-2004 (Portsmouth NH: Peter E. Randall, 2004).
- J. Salisbury, "Veterans' Memorials Moved to Temporary Home," The Cabinet (Milford NH) November 4, 2009
- J. Salisbury, "War Memorials Committee Formed," The Cabinet, January 14, 2010
- J. Salisbury, "2 Memorials, Cannon back in Lyndeborough," Nashua Telegraph (Nashua NH) May 4, 2010
- J. Salisbury, "Lyndeborough Common plans being Finalized," The Cabinet, August 19, 2010
- D. Shalhoup, "Memorial Day Around the Souhegan Valley," The Cabinet, June 3, 2010
- "West Point Foundry"
