= Lafayette Artillery Company =

Component of the military in New Hampshire, USA

The Lafayette Artillery Company was founded in Peterborough, New Hampshire, in 1804 as the Artillery Company of the 22nd Regiment. It was part of the State of New Hampshire's artillery system, a forerunner to the National Guard. The group has continued to operate continuously since its founding, and since 1833 it has been headquartered at Lyndeborough, New Hampshire. Since the 1980s, it has been primarily an educational service organization, and participates in Civil War reenactments throughout the northeastern United States.

== History ==
=== Formation and early history ===
In 1804, in the wake of the reorganization of New Hampshire's state militia system, several new artillery companies were founded around New Hampshire. These included units in Somersworth, Walpole, Keene, Fitzwilliam, and Peterborough. Peterborough's artillery unit belonged to the Twenty-Second Regiment, a unit consisting of infantry companies from New Ipswich, Sharon, Mason, Temple, Wilton, and Peterborough. James Wilson, a lawyer and state legislator, served as the group's first captain. At the time, military service was compulsory, and being a member of the artillery was an honor—or at least it was more prestigious than being a member of the infantry. Little else is known about the artillery's early years except that, in response to the British Navy's blockade of New England during the War of 1812, several of its members served in the defense of Portsmouth in 1814.

In the 1820s, the artillery faced a decade of instability and change. Between 1804 and 1820, the organization had been led by only three captains, but from 1820 to 1832, five captains served an average of 28.8 months each. Artillery membership also began to change; as Peterborough industrialized, its residents were less inclined to join the organization, and membership from Wilton and Lyndeborough (which was annexed to the Twenty-Second Regiment some years earlier) increased. By 1833, the organization was headed by Eleazer Putnam of Lyndeborough, most Peterborough members had withdrawn, and the artillery moved to a new headquarters near Putnam's house in South Lyndeborough.

=== Incorporation and the Civil War ===
In 1837, the Artillery Company of the Twenty-Second Regiment petitioned to be incorporated, adopting the name "Lafayette Artillery Company," probably in honor of the French nobleman Gilbert du Motier, marquis de La Fayette, who died in 1834. During this period the group acquired the brass cannon for which it still cares. In the 1820s the artillery may have possessed an iron cannon, but between 1835 and 1844 its cannon was a brass one which, in 1844, inspectors determined to be "unfit for service." In December, 1844, the New Hampshire Legislature passed an act granting the unit a new, 822-pound, six-pounder brass cannon, which the group picked up from Portsmouth. The gun had been cast in 1844 by the Ames Manufacturing Company of Springfield, Massachusetts, and remains in the group's possession today. Of interest to military historians, the group also maintains the original caisson, made at the Watervliet Arsenal (and so marked), complete in all-original condition (except the paint), including the wheels.

The group continued training, and in 1850 finally put its training to use at the regiment's annual muster. That year, the group attended the training muster at Amherst. The crowd of onlookers was considerably more boisterous than usual, however, and the artillery was called out to restore order. Nearly a half-century later, surviving members remembered how they chased a den of gamblers from the muster field and took as their prisoner a blanket, which they used to cover the cannon for many years.

During the Civil War, the Artillery again was called upon to defend Portsmouth from possible attack, and the group served for six weeks at Fort Constitution, seeing no action. The organization's cannon was used for training in Nashua in 1863. However, about twenty of the Artillery's members enlisted in regiments which saw action in the Civil War, among them Harvey Holt, Jr., said to be the first New Hampshire man to die at the First Battle of Bull Run in 1861. Others who died in the Civil War included John Hartshorn (namesake of the town's Hartshorn Memorial Cannon), who died at the Battle of Williamsburg in 1862; John Karr at Vicksburg; and James Boutwell, who fought in the western theater. Other noteworthy artillery members include David Proctor and George Woodward, who led the Thirtieth Regiment of the U.S. Colored Troops at Petersburg, Virginia; and Azro Cram, who was wounded in Louisiana and taken prisoner by the Confederacy before being released in a prisoner exchange.

=== Late 19th century ===
After the Civil War, the Lafayette Artillery was one of the few New Hampshire artillery companies which did not disband. By 1877 it had become a social organization, and that year it initiated the February 22nd Levee and Ball. The celebration was chosen both to honor George Washington and as a date on which to celebrate the group's birthday—though its actual date of inception could not be identified. The levees began with speeches in the morning, usually at the church, above the depot, or above the store in South Lyndeborough. After a midday dinner, the afternoon featured orations, music, and entertainment. The highlight of the day was the evening ball that often lasted until early the following morning, with a turkey or ham supper served at about 10:30 PM.

The celebration proved so successful that in 1888 the group asked the Town of Lyndeborough to help construct a building, to be known as "Union Hall," to house the event. The group invited the Harvey Holt Post of the Grand Army of the Republic to occupy the building with them, and there was talk of placing the community library in the building. The town did eventually construct the building on a hill overlooking the village, and in an effort to emphasize its community nature named it Citizens' Hall. Still, the library never materialized, and a number of townspeople were so disgusted by the use of public funds to support the artillery that they refused to set foot in Citizens' Hall as late as 1906. Citizens' Hall was listed on the National Register of Historic Places in 1999.

=== 1900–1940 ===
The Artillery continued to occupy a social niche in Lyndeborough into the early twentieth century. Its annual levee and ball began to feature oyster stew as one of its featured dinners, and even in the 1930s—when Lyndeborough's population was only 399 people—the ball often attracted 400 people or more to South Lyndeborough. The group's centennial in September, 1904 was, essentially, a February 22 celebration, though lunch and most of the orations during the day were held outdoors at the home of Artillery captain Andy Holt. The organization also held squirrel hunts, produced plays, organized service activities, and sponsored a baseball team. It also became a fixture at parades throughout the region, traveling to New Ipswich, Greenfield, Francestown, Manchester, and elsewhere. With the deaths of the last local GAR members, the artillery took over the planning for the town's Memorial Day activities, which it continues to oversee as of today (2006).

=== 1941–2010 ===
Many of the artillery's members served in World War II. However, after the war, the Lafayette Artillery Company's fortunes declined as it competed with the VFW, television, increased commute times, and family life for the attentions of its members. Citizens' Hall fell into disrepair, and in the 1960s the town moved its town offices into the building. The organization still had its 1844 cannon, but attempts to hold cannon drills were met with complaints from the town's residents. Bylaws continuously were amended so that fewer and fewer members had to be present in order to transact business at meetings. The February 22nd Ball became less and less popular, and in 1953 the annual event was cancelled, not resurfacing again on an annual basis until 2000.

Despite a temporary resurgence in the late 1960s and early 1970s, the artillery continued to decline until the early 1980s, when it began admitting women as full members. The organization also redefined its mission, becoming a Civil War reenactment group by the late 1980s. These changes kept the organization from collapsing, though membership has never totally rebounded, and was hurt more when, in 2004, a splinter group formed its own short-lived artillery in Lyndeborough. A 1999 fire at one member's home destroyed some of the group's valuable mementos, though its records, guns, and cannon remain safely stored. Today, the organization continues to be at the forefront of Lyndeborough's and Wilton's Memorial Day celebrations. It hosted the annual Washington's Birthday Ball from 2000–2007, and is cited for its important role in the renovation of Citizens' Hall in 1997–2000. As of 2010, members also are involved with the cleanup of the South Lyndeborough village common, the relocation of the town's war memorials to that location, and the creation of new war memorials to commemorate the service of Vietnam and other veterans.
