= Stony Brook (Souhegan River tributary) =

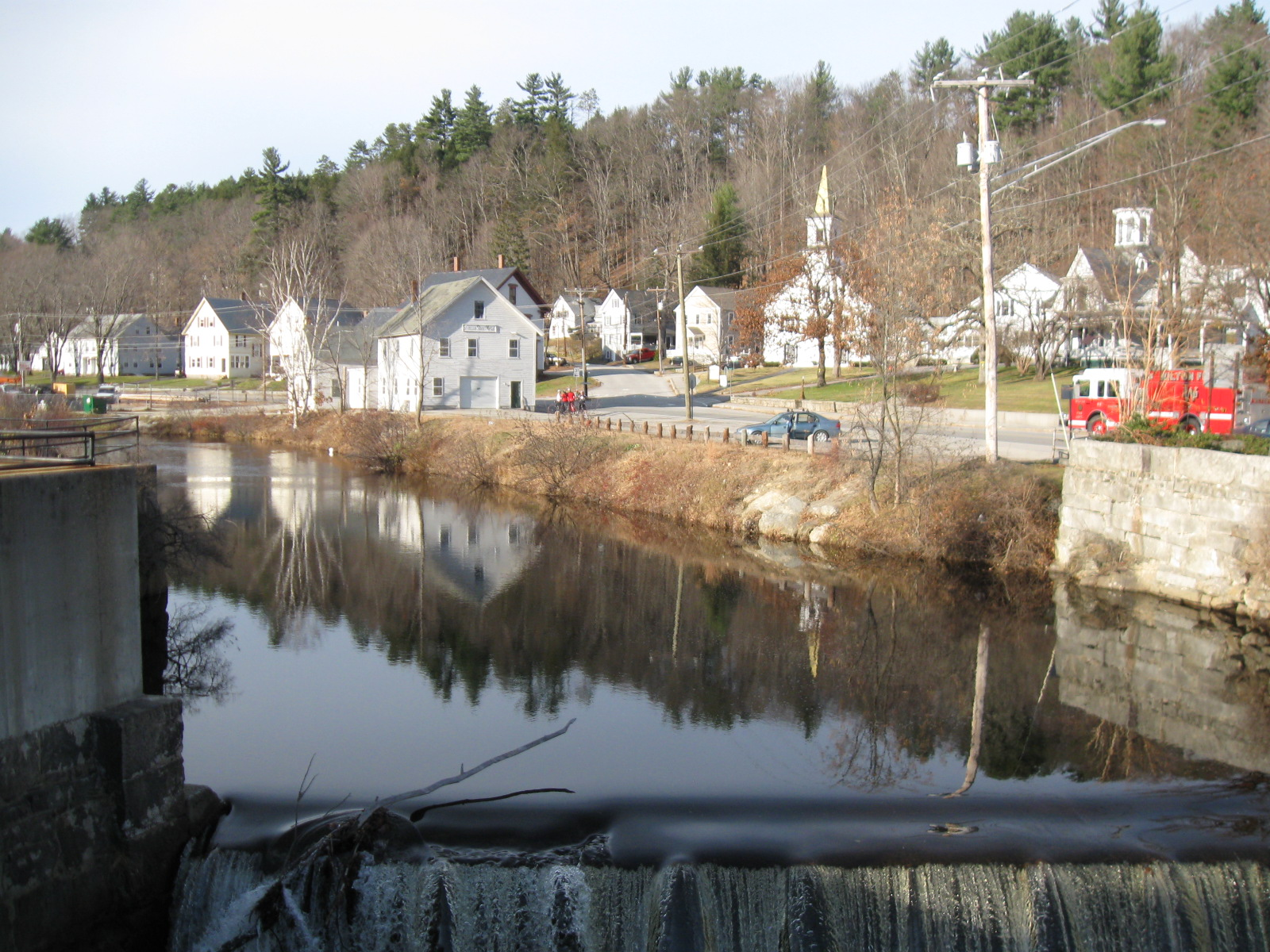
- Stony Brook near its mouth in Wilton, NH

- Location within New Hampshire Location within the United States

Location
- Country: United States
- State: New Hampshire
- County: Hillsborough
- Towns: Greenfield, Lyndeborough, Wilton

Physical characteristics
- Source: Lyndeborough Mountain
  - location: Lyndeborough
  - coordinates: 42°55′14″N 71°48′19″W
  - elevation: 1,270 ft (390 m)
- Mouth: Souhegan River
  - location: Wilton
  - coordinates: 42°50′39″N 71°44′20″W
  - elevation: 338 ft (103 m)
- Length: 10.6 mi (17.1 km)

Stony Brook is a 10.6-mile-long (17.1 km) river located in southern New Hampshire in the United States. It is a tributary of the Souhegan River, which flows to the Merrimack River and ultimately to the Gulf of Maine.

Stony Brook rises in the town of Lyndeborough, New Hampshire, in a valley between Lyndeborough Mountain to the north and Winn Mountain to the south. It flows west into the town of Greenfield, then turns southeast and reenters Lyndeborough, continuing to the Souhegan in the mill town of Wilton.

It is paralleled from Greenfield to Wilton by New Hampshire Route 31 and by the former Hillsboro Branch of the Boston and Maine Railroad.

== See also ==
- List of rivers of New Hampshire
