= Lyndeborough, New Hampshire =

- Town
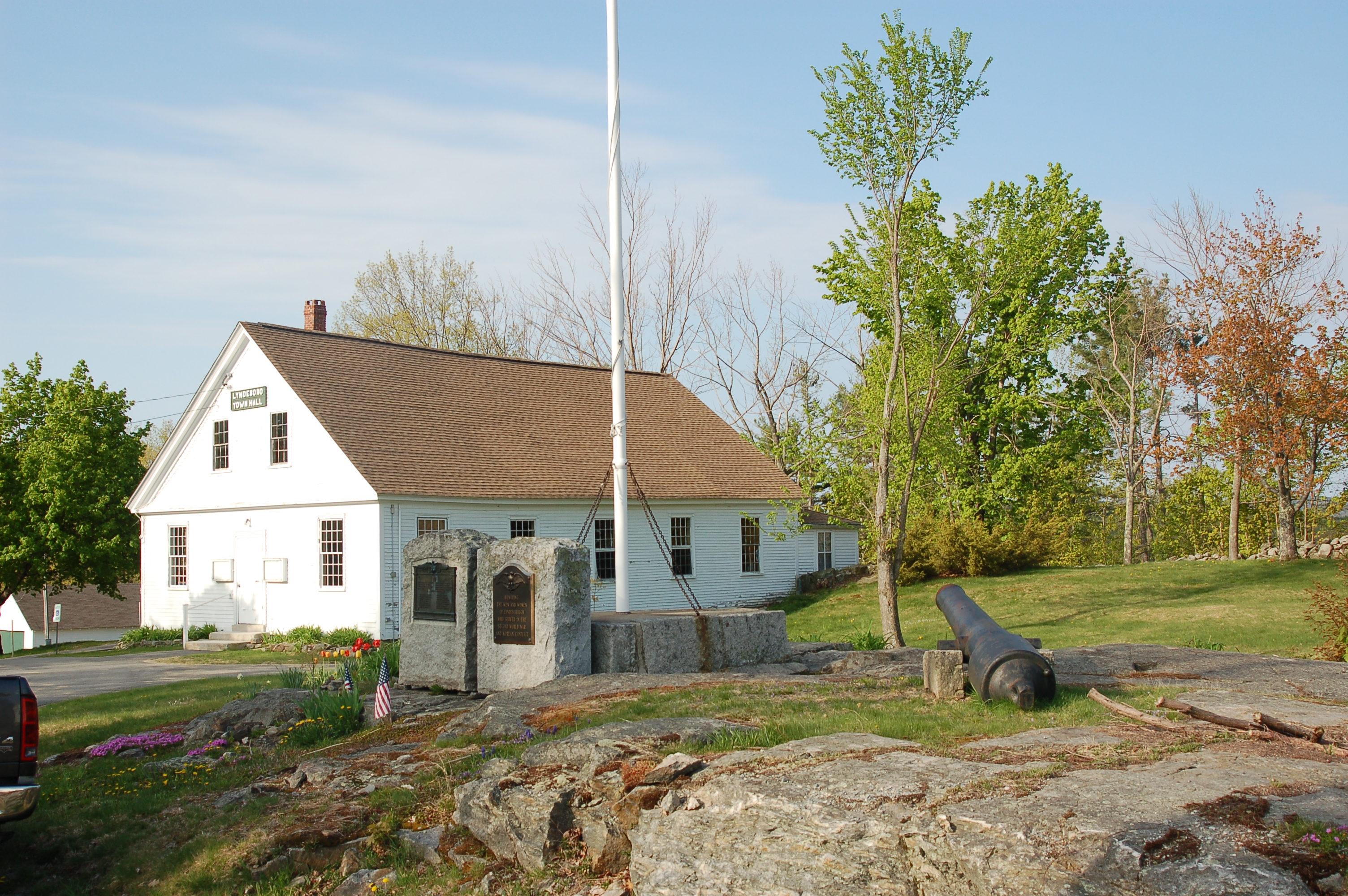
- 1846 Town Hall

- Seal

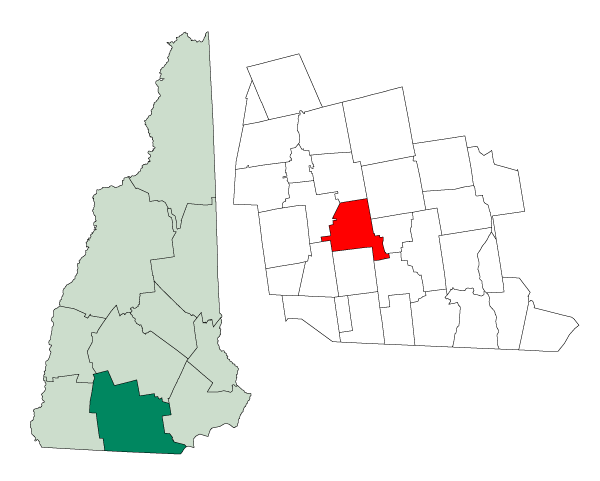
- Location in Hillsborough County, New Hampshire
- Coordinates: 42°54′27″N 71°45′59″W
- Country: United States
- State: New Hampshire
- County: Hillsborough
- Incorporated: 1764
- Villages: Lyndeborough; South Lyndeborough

Government
  - Board of Selectmen: Mark Chamberlain, Chair; Bob H. Howe; Howard Ray
  - Town Administrator: Geoffrey Allen

Area
  - Total: 30.5 sq mi (79.1 km^{2})
  - Land: 30.4 sq mi (78.8 km^{2})
  - Water: 0.12 sq mi (0.3 km^{2}) 0.38%
- Elevation: 883 ft (269 m)

Population (2020)
  - Total: 1,702
  - Density: 56/sq mi (21.6/km^{2})
- Time zone: UTC-5 (Eastern)
  - Summer (DST): UTC-4 (Eastern)
- ZIP code: 03082
- Area code: 603
- FIPS code: 33-44580
- GNIS feature ID: 0873655
- Website: town.lyndeborough.nh.us

Lyndeborough /ˈlaɪndˌbʌroʊ/ is a town in Hillsborough County, New Hampshire, United States. The population was 1,702 at the 2020 census.

== History ==
Originally granted by the Massachusetts General Court to veterans from Salem, Massachusetts, of New England's first war with Canada, the area was known as "Salem-Canada". John Cram and his family were the first settlers and established a sawmill in the community in 1736. The name "Lyndeborough" resulted from a re-grant to a group of people that included Benjamin Lynde, who later became Chief Justice of Massachusetts. This group of proprietors never lived in Lyndeborough and may never have visited the community. For instance, while serving as a proprietor of Lyndeborough, Judge Lynde lived in Massachusetts, where he presided in Suffolk County over the trial stemming from the Boston Massacre.

The town has been home to the Lafayette Artillery Company (founded 1804) since 1833. The town office building, Citizens' Hall (opened 1889), is listed on the National Register of Historic Places, as is the Lyndeborough Center Historic District, which consists of the Congregational church (c. 1836), town hall (1846), and remnants of the town pound (1774).

== Geography ==
According to the United States Census Bureau, the town has a total area of 30.5 square miles (79.1 km^{2}), of which 30.4 square miles (78.8 km^{2}) are land and 0.1 square miles (0.3 km^{2}) are water, comprising 0.38% of the town. The central and southern portions of the town are drained by Stony Brook and Curtis Brook, southeast-flowing tributaries of the Souhegan River, while the northern part is drained by Cold Brook, an east-flowing tributary of the South Branch Piscataquog River. The entire town is part of the Merrimack River watershed.

The highest point in Lyndeborough is just shy of 1,800 feet (550 m) above sea level, where the east ridge of North Pack Monadnock Mountain crosses the town's western border. Notable summits in town include Winn Mountain (1,686 ft or 514 m), Rose Mountain (1,730 ft or 530 m), and The Pinnacle (1,703 ft or 519 m). The town is crossed by New Hampshire Route 31, which leads northwest into Greenfield and southeast into Wilton.

=== Adjacent municipalities ===
- Francestown (north)
- New Boston (northeast)
- Mont Vernon (east)
- Milford (southeast)
- Wilton (south)
- Temple (southwest)
- Greenfield (west)

== Demographics ==
Historical population
Census	Pop.	Note	%±
1790	1,280		—
1800	976		−23.7%
1810	1,074		10.0%
1820	1,168		8.8%
1830	1,147		−1.8%
1840	1,033		−9.9%
1850	968		−6.3%
1860	823		−15.0%
1870	820		−0.4%
1880	818		−0.2%
1890	657		−19.7%
1900	686		4.4%
1910	660		−3.8%
1920	428		−35.2%
1930	399		−6.8%
1940	452		13.3%
1950	552		22.1%
1960	594		7.6%
1970	789		32.8%
1980	1,070		35.6%
1990	1,294		20.9%
2000	1,585		22.5%
2010	1,683		6.2%
2020	1,702		1.1%
2024 (est.)	1,712		0.6%
U.S. Decennial Census

As of the census of 2000, there were 1,585 people, 560 households, and 420 families residing in the town. The population density was 51.0 inhabitants per square mile (19.7/km^{2}). There were 587 housing units at an average density of 18.9 per square mile (7.3/km^{2}). The racial makeup of the town was 98.17% White, 0.19% African American, 0.13% Native American, 0.32% Asian, 0.38% from other races, and 0.82% from two or more races. Hispanic or Latino of any race were 1.64% of the population.

There were 560 households, out of which 37.1% had children under the age of 18 living with them, 67.7% were married couples living together, 4.8% had a female householder with no husband present, and 25.0% were non-families. 16.4% of all households were made up of individuals, and 5.7% had someone living alone who was 65 years of age or older. The average household size was 2.83 and the average family size was 3.20.

In the town, the population was spread out, with 26.9% under the age of 18, 6.3% from 18 to 24, 32.6% from 25 to 44, 27.3% from 45 to 64, and 6.9% who were 65 years of age or older. The median age was 38 years. For every 100 females, there were 102.9 males. For every 100 females age 18 and over, there were 99.8 males.

The median income for a household in the town was $59,688, and the median income for a family was $70,223. Males had a median income of $37,941 versus $29,327 for females. The per capita income for the town was $27,169. About 1.2% of families and 3.3% of the population were below the poverty line, including 3.0% of those under age 18 and 8.4% of those age 65 or over.

== Notable people ==
- William Barron (1787–1872), United States Marshal for the District of Vermont
- Eddie Mottau, guitarist
- Willard Parker (1800–1884), pioneering surgeon

== Sites of interest ==
- Citizens' Hall
- Hartshorn Memorial Cannon
- Lafayette Artillery Company
- Lyndeborough Center Historic District
