= Souhegan Wood Products =

Souhegan Wood Products, or SWP, is a company located in Wilton, New Hampshire, that specializes in the manufacture and distribution of a variety of recycled wood products.

== History ==
Souhegan Wood Products (SWP) was founded in 1941 when C. Randolph "Randy" Myer purchased a sawmill and began running a dressing mill in order to process some of the two billion trees downed by the New England Hurricane of 1938. The name "Souhegan" is derived from the nearby Souhegan River, a tributary of the Merrimack River. During this period, the amount of wood going to waste was overwhelming, and solutions to wood waste were in high demand. Randolph Myer, a 1924 graduate as a mechanical engineer of MIT, became interested in using wood waste from lumbering operations after working for Longbelle Lumber Company, out of Texas, on their operations in Washington state. There he observed the amount of waste remaining after processing. During World War II, SWP manufactured ammunition boxes for the government. The war also created such a sharp demand for lumber that SWP was distributing wood nearly as a fast as it was cut, not allowing the wood time to dry. Myer built a dry kiln, where wood could dry as rapidly as five days. By 1944, the company had developed a particle board called "Plaswood" that they manufactured until 1954, when the company expanded its manufacture of molded products.

== Location ==
Souhegan Wood Products is housed at the Souhegan Mills, located in the town of Wilton in Hillsborough County, New Hampshire. Wilton is located approximately 60 miles (97 km) northwest of Boston and 45 miles (72 km) southwest of Concord, the capital of New Hampshire. The mill was built in 1925 by the Souhegan Apple Packing Association for the sorting, storage, and packing of apples. In 1938 David Whiting and Sons purchased the property and turned it into a dressing mill. C. Randolph Myer purchased the mill in 1941 and installed a dry kiln; both the kiln and the mill burned in a fierce fire in 1944. The mill was rebuilt in the same year, and Souhegan Wood Products returned to the manufacture of ammunition boxes for the army.

== Wood Recycling ==
Souhegan Wood Products acquires all of its waste wood from a variety of woodworking enterprises within 100 miles of its Wilton facility. In its 65-year history, SWP has produced a diverse array of wood products, including bases for brushes, wheel rims for tea carts, and Banjo heads. Currently SWP focuses on the manufacture of Belt-Winding shells, "Corsaver" core-plugs, center-hole core plugs, casket tops, as well as veneered casket tops. The Belt-winding cores are made from graded and softwood particles, combined under heat and pressure. They are extruded cylinders of graded wood particles compounded with high strength resins and square center holes.

== Present ==
Souhegan Wood Products is in its fourth generation of family ownership. Current design developments include paper plugs, as well as a staved extruded core that provides both high beam and compression strength. Today, SWP ships its products nationally and internationally to customers in Mexico, Canada, England, the Netherlands, Taiwan, Malaysia, and South Korea.
