= Wilton, New Hampshire =

- Town
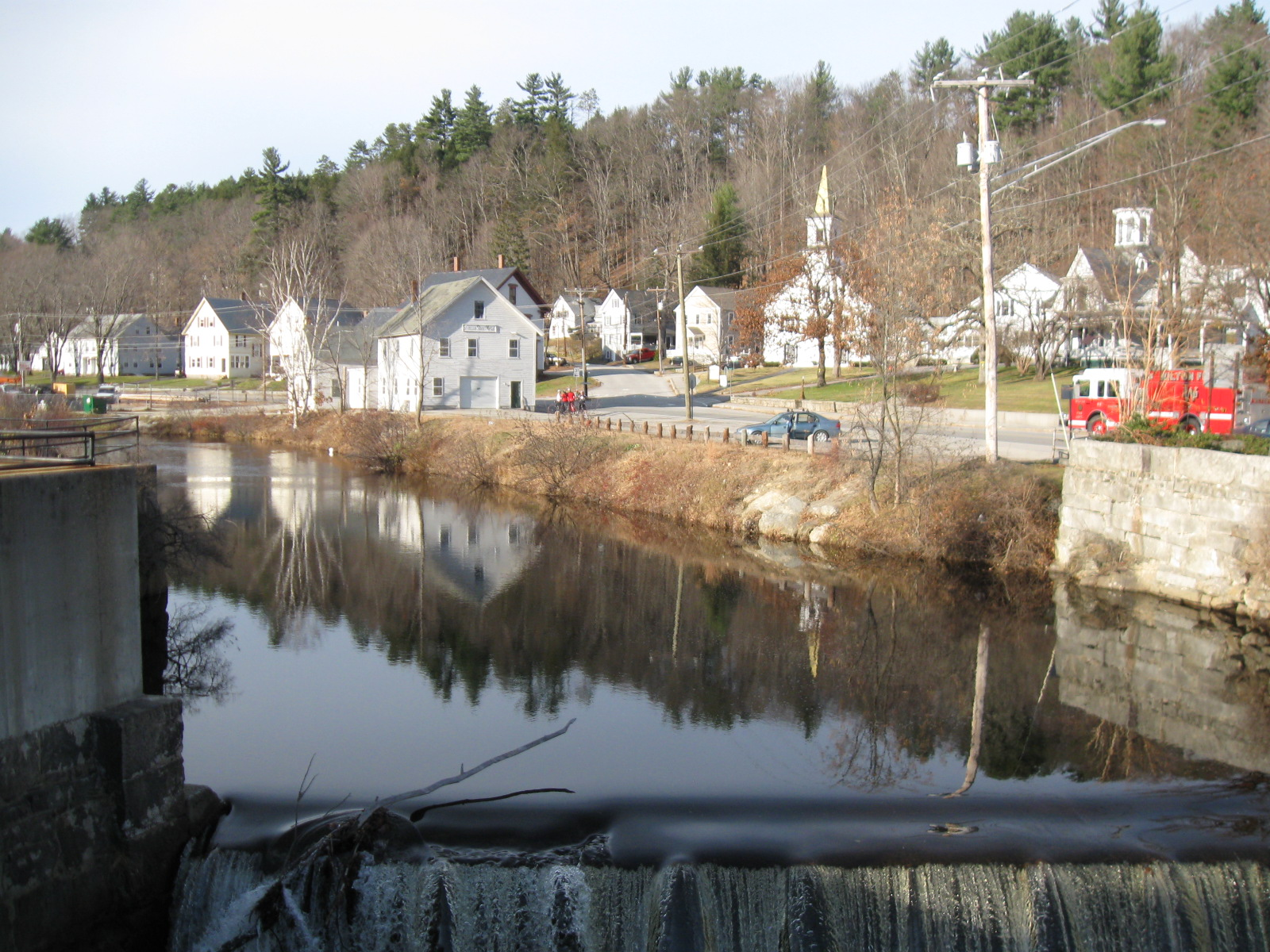
- Stony Brook near the town center

- Seal

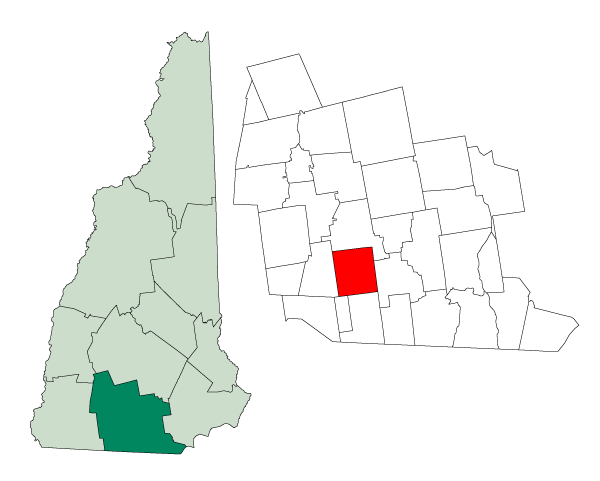
- Location in Hillsborough County, New Hampshire
- Coordinates: 42°50′36″N 71°44′06″W
- Country: United States
- State: New Hampshire
- County: Hillsborough
- Incorporated: 1762
- Villages: Wilton; West Wilton; Wilton Center

Government
  - Select Board: Kermit Williams, Chair; Thomas Schultz; Frank Edelblut
  - Town Administrator: Nick Germain

Area
  - Total: 25.70 sq mi (66.57 km^{2})
  - Land: 25.61 sq mi (66.33 km^{2})
  - Water: 0.089 sq mi (0.23 km^{2}) 0.35%
- Elevation: 384 ft (117 m)

Population (2020)
  - Total: 3,896
  - Density: 152/sq mi (58.7/km^{2})
- Time zone: UTC-5 (Eastern)
  - Summer (DST): UTC-4 (Eastern)
- ZIP code: 03086
- Area code: 603
- FIPS code: 33-85220
- GNIS feature ID: 0873756
- Website: www.wiltonnh.gov

Wilton is a town in Hillsborough County, New Hampshire, United States. The population was 3,896 at the 2020 census. Like many small New England towns, it grew up around water-powered textile mills, but is now a rural bedroom community with some manufacturing and service employment. Wilton is home to the High Mowing School, a private preparatory school.

The main village in town, where 1,324 people resided at the 2020 census, is defined by the U.S. Census Bureau as the Wilton census-designated place and is located near the junction of New Hampshire Routes 31 and 101, at the confluence of Stony Brook with the Souhegan River.

== History ==
The town was first part of a township chartered as "Salem-Canada" in 1735 by Colonial Governor Jonathan Belcher of Massachusetts, which then claimed this area. It was granted to soldiers from Salem, Massachusetts, who had served in 1690 under Sir William Phips in the war against Canada. "Salem-Canada" was one of the towns on the state's borders intended to provide protection against Indian attack.

The area was regranted in 1749 by New Hampshire colonial Governor Benning Wentworth as "Number Two", before being incorporated in 1762 as "Wilton". It was either named for Wilton in England, or for Sir Joseph Wilton, a famous English sculptor. Sir Wilton's coach design for King George III's coronation was later used as a model for the Concord coach. The town of Wilton, Maine, would later be named for Wilton, New Hampshire.

The first Sunday school was established in May 1816, and was connected with the Congregational church of which the Rev. Thomas Beede was pastor. It was held in the Centre schoolhouse. Two women, Phebe Abbot, the mother of Prof. Ezra Abbot of Harvard University, and Sarah White Livermore, the hymnist, were leaders in this enterprise. This school was one of the first, if not the first, in the U.S. to be devoted especially and wholly to religious instruction. Seventy children attended the first season. The only book used was the Bible.

The Souhegan River originally provided water power for mills. Today, Wilton is a rural town with orchards, farms and woodlands.

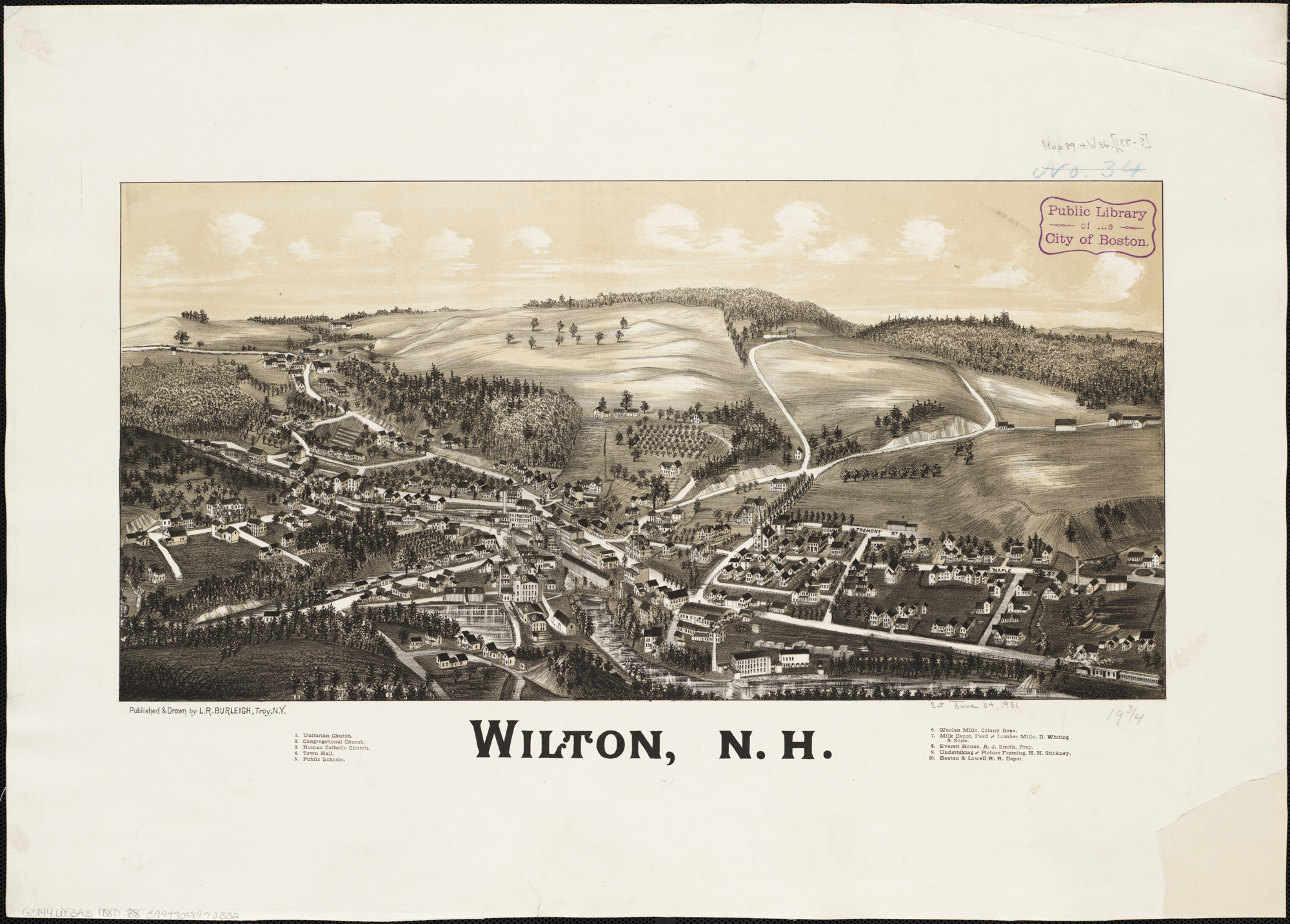
Wilton in 1880

Town Hall

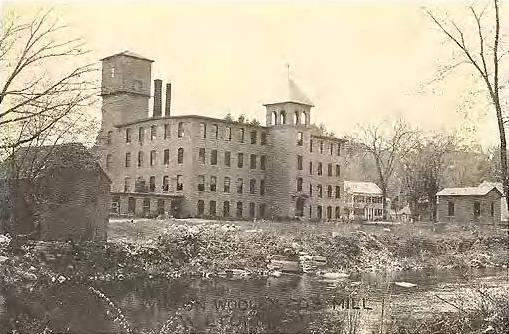
Wilton Woolen Co. mill in 1912

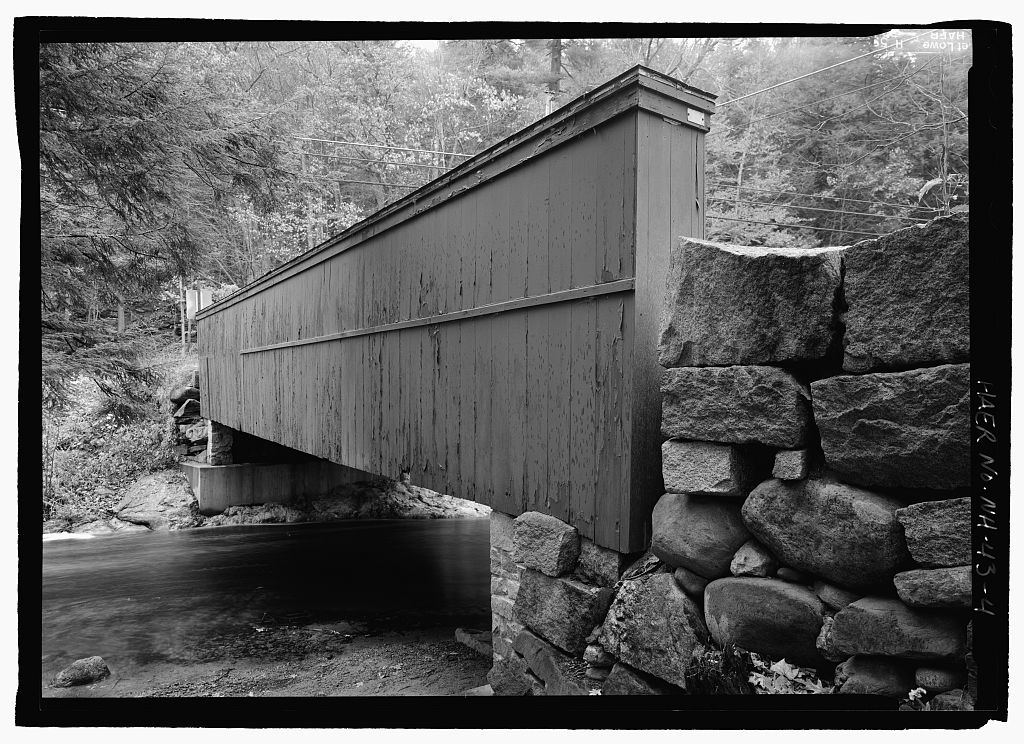
Livermore Bridge over Blood Brook

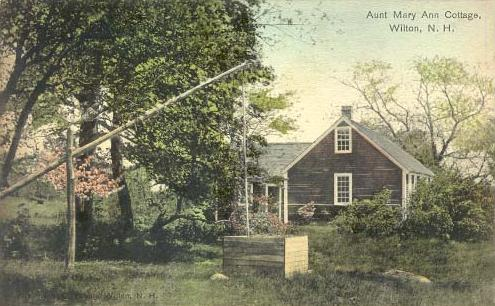
Aunt Mary Ann Cottage c. 1915

== Geography ==
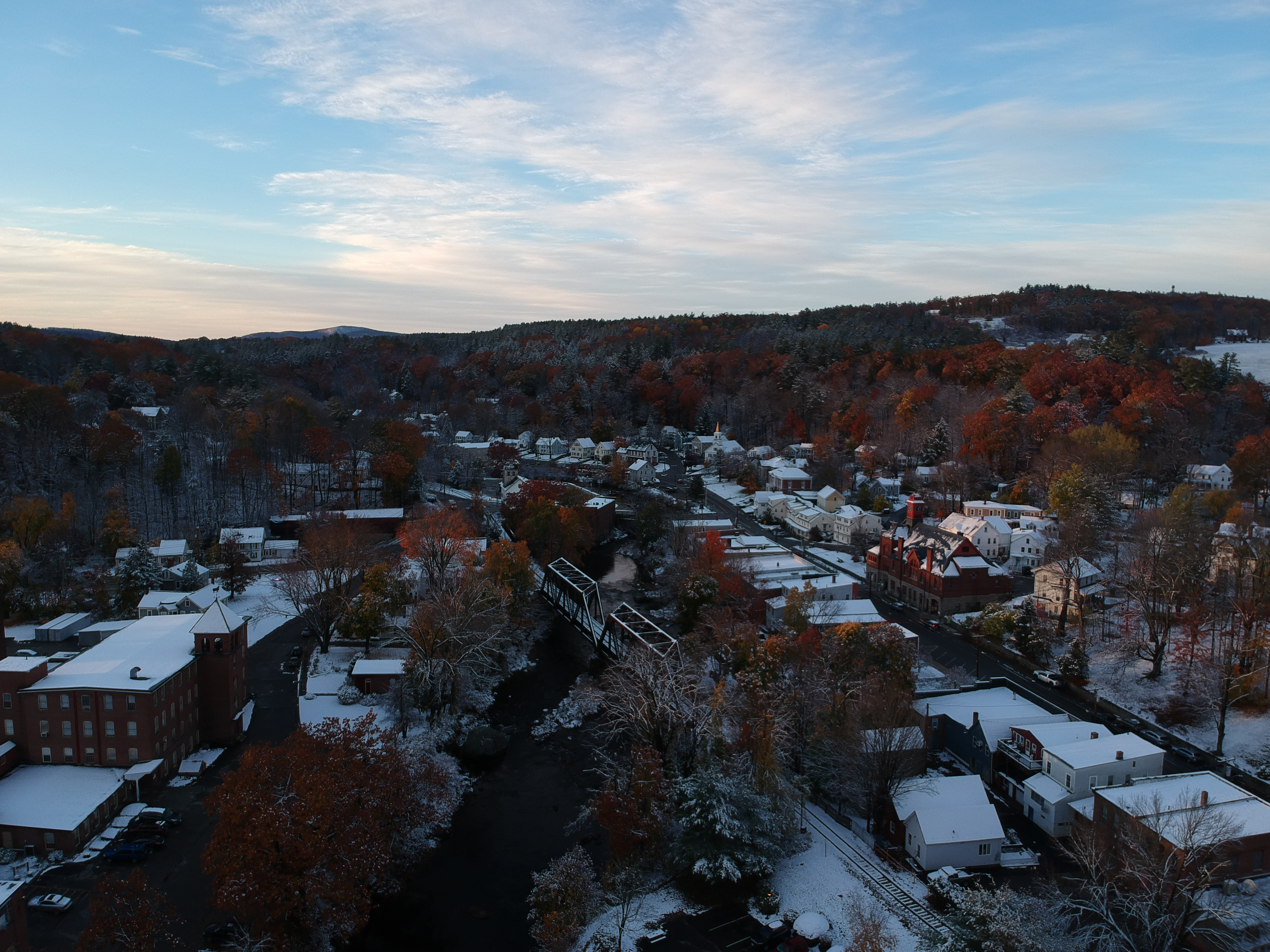
The Souhegan River winds its way through downtown Wilton after a rare October snowfall.

According to the United States Census Bureau, the town has a total area of 25.7 square miles (66.6 km^{2}), of which 25.6 square miles (66.3 km^{2}) are land and 0.1 square miles (0.2 km^{2}), or 0.35%, is water. Wilton is drained by the Souhegan River and its tributaries, Stony Brook and Blood Brook. Via the Souhegan, the entire town is part of the Merrimack River watershed. The town's highest point is 1,140 feet (350 m) above sea level, where the east slope of Fisk Hill touches the town's western border.

=== Adjacent municipalities ===
- Lyndeborough (north)
- Milford (east)
- Mason (south)
- Greenville (southwest)
- Temple (west)

== Demographics ==
Historical population
Census	Pop.	Note	%±
1790	1,105		—
1800	1,010		−8.6%
1810	1,017		0.7%
1820	1,070		5.2%
1830	1,041		−2.7%
1840	1,033		−0.8%
1850	1,161		12.4%
1860	1,369		17.9%
1870	1,974		44.2%
1880	1,747		−11.5%
1890	1,850		5.9%
1900	1,696		−8.3%
1910	1,490		−12.1%
1920	1,546		3.8%
1930	1,724		11.5%
1940	1,855		7.6%
1950	1,952		5.2%
1960	2,025		3.7%
1970	2,276		12.4%
1980	2,669		17.3%
1990	3,122		17.0%
2000	3,743		19.9%
2010	3,677		−1.8%
2020	3,896		6.0%
2024 (est.)	3,985		2.3%
U.S. Decennial Census

As of the census of 2010, there were 3,677 people, 1,418 households, and 1,015 families residing in the town. There were 1,530 housing units, of which 112, or 7.3%, were vacant. The racial makeup of the town was 97.1% White, 0.5% African American, 0.2% Native American, 0.5% Asian, 0.0% Native Hawaiian or Pacific Islander, 0.2% some other race, and 1.5% from two or more races. 1.4% of the population were Hispanic or Latino of any race.

Of the 1,418 households, 33.1% had children under the age of 18 living with them, 56.8% were headed by married couples living together, 9.2% had a female householder with no husband present, and 28.4% were non-families. 22.0% of all households were made up of individuals, and 8.1% were someone living alone who was 65 years of age or older. The average household size was 2.59, and the average family size was 3.02.

In the town, 23.5% of the population were under the age of 18, 6.6% were from 18 to 24, 24.5% from 25 to 44, 33.6% from 45 to 64, and 11.9% were 65 years of age or older. The median age was 42.1 years. For every 100 females, there were 98.5 males. For every 100 females age 18 and over, there were 99.2 males.

For the period 2011–2015, the estimated median annual income for a household was $71,066, and the median income for a family was $90,134. The per capita income for the town was $33,824. 4.3% of the population and 1.0% of families were below the poverty line. 7.1% of the population under the age of 18 and 4.8% of those 65 or older were living in poverty.

== Sites of interest ==
- Wilton is home to part of the Russell-Abbott State Forest, named for two of Wilton's earliest families.
- Andy's Summer Playhouse is a children's theatre that attracts visitors throughout the region.
- Frye's Measure Mill, a historic 150-year-old mill, is three miles west of downtown Wilton, at the junction of Davisville Road and Burton Highway, with tours available.
- The Wilton Town Hall Theatre is a private art-house movie theater which screens films in the Town Hall's auditorium and in a former dressing room for vaudeville troupes which once played the auditorium.
- The Souhegan Mills are an iconic part of the Wilton town center landscape, and have been used alternatively as an apple packing plant, a dressing mill, and an ammunition box factory during World War II. Souhegan Mills is currently the home of Souhegan Wood Products, a manufacturer and distributor of a variety of recycled wood products.
- The Oliver Whiting Homestead is a historic farmstead on Old County Farm Road.

== Notable people ==
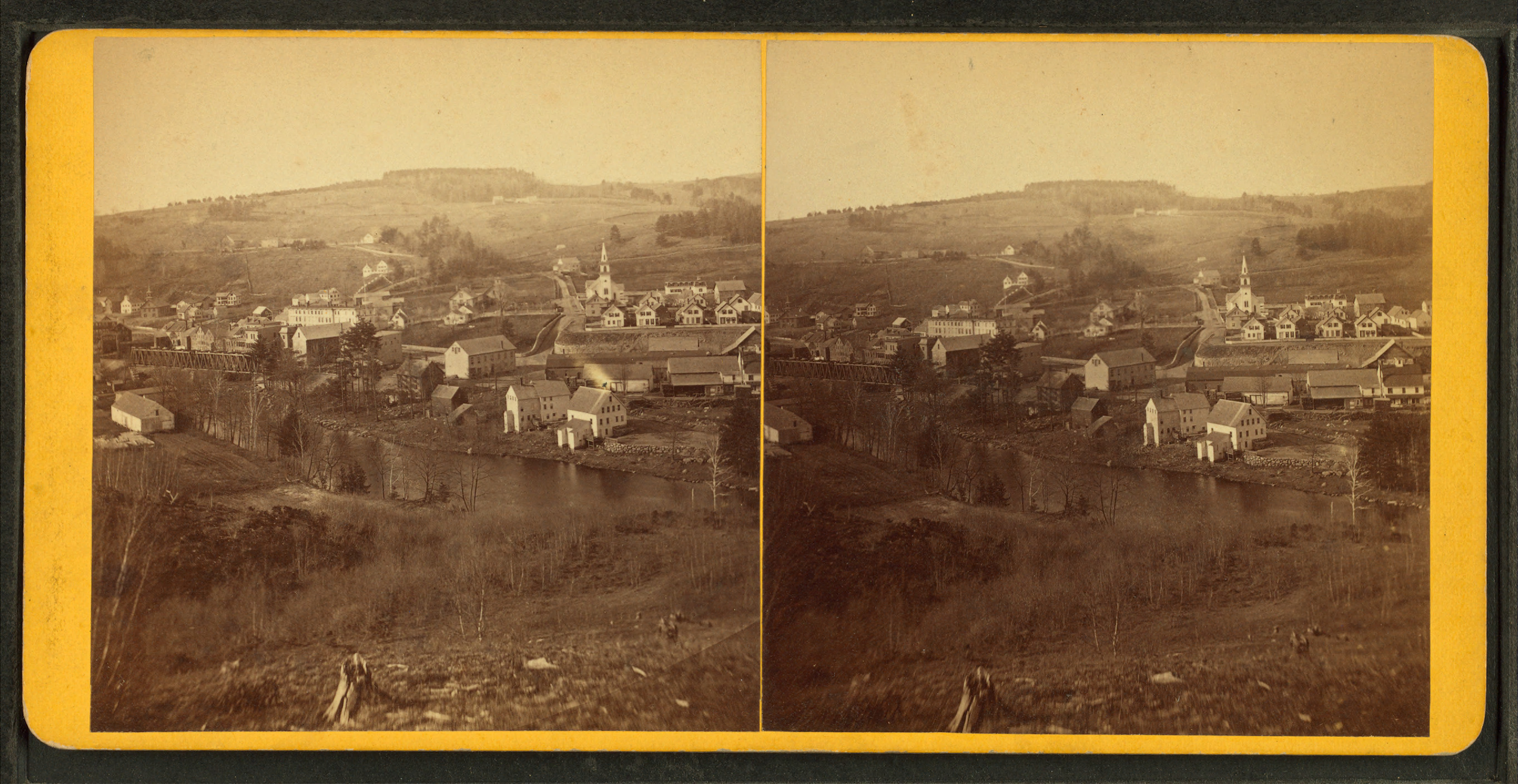
Wilton c. 1870–1880

- Charles Greeley Abbot (1872–1973), astrophysicist
- John Putnam Batchelder (1784–1868), surgeon, anatomist
- Charles A. Burns (1863–1930), businessman, politician
- Frank Gay Clarke (1850–1901), congressman
- Snatam Kaur (1972–), American singer, songwriter and author
- Sarah White Livermore (1789–1874), teacher and writer
- Rod Price (1947–2005), guitarist, recording artist (blues/rock band, "Foghat")
- Annie R. Smith (1828–1855), early American Seventh-day Adventist hymnist, and sister of the Adventist pioneer Uriah Smith
- Uriah Smith (1832–1903), Seventh-day Adventist author, minister, educator; best known as the longest serving editor of the Review and Herald (now the Adventist Review) for over 50 years
- William French Smith (1917–1990), 74th United States Attorney General
