= Monadnock (disambiguation) =

Monadnock may refer to:

A geologic term

- Monadnock or "inselberg", a generic term for isolated mountain

Names of summits

- Mount Monadnock, a well-known summit in southwestern New Hampshire, United States, located in the town of Jaffrey
- Monadnock Mountain (Vermont), a summit in Lemington, Vermont, United States
- Pack Monadnock, a mountain in the Wapack Range of southern New Hampshire
- North Pack Monadnock, a mountain in the Wapack Range of southern New Hampshire
- Little Monadnock Mountain, a mountain located in southern New Hampshire in the towns of Troy and Fitzwilliam

Hiking trails

- Metacomet-Monadnock Trail, a 110 mi (180 km) hiking trail located in western Massachusetts and southern New Hampshire
- Monadnock-Sunapee Greenway, a 50 mi (80 km) hiking trail located in southwestern New Hampshire

Architecture

- The Monadnock Building, a proto-skyscraper located in the city of Chicago, Illinois
- The Monadnock Building (San Francisco)

Business

- Monadnock Lifetime Products, a law enforcement equipment company

Ships

- USS Monadnock, various ships of the United States Navy with this name
