= Wapack National Wildlife Refuge =

Protected area in New Hampshire, United States

- IUCN category IV (habitat/species management area)
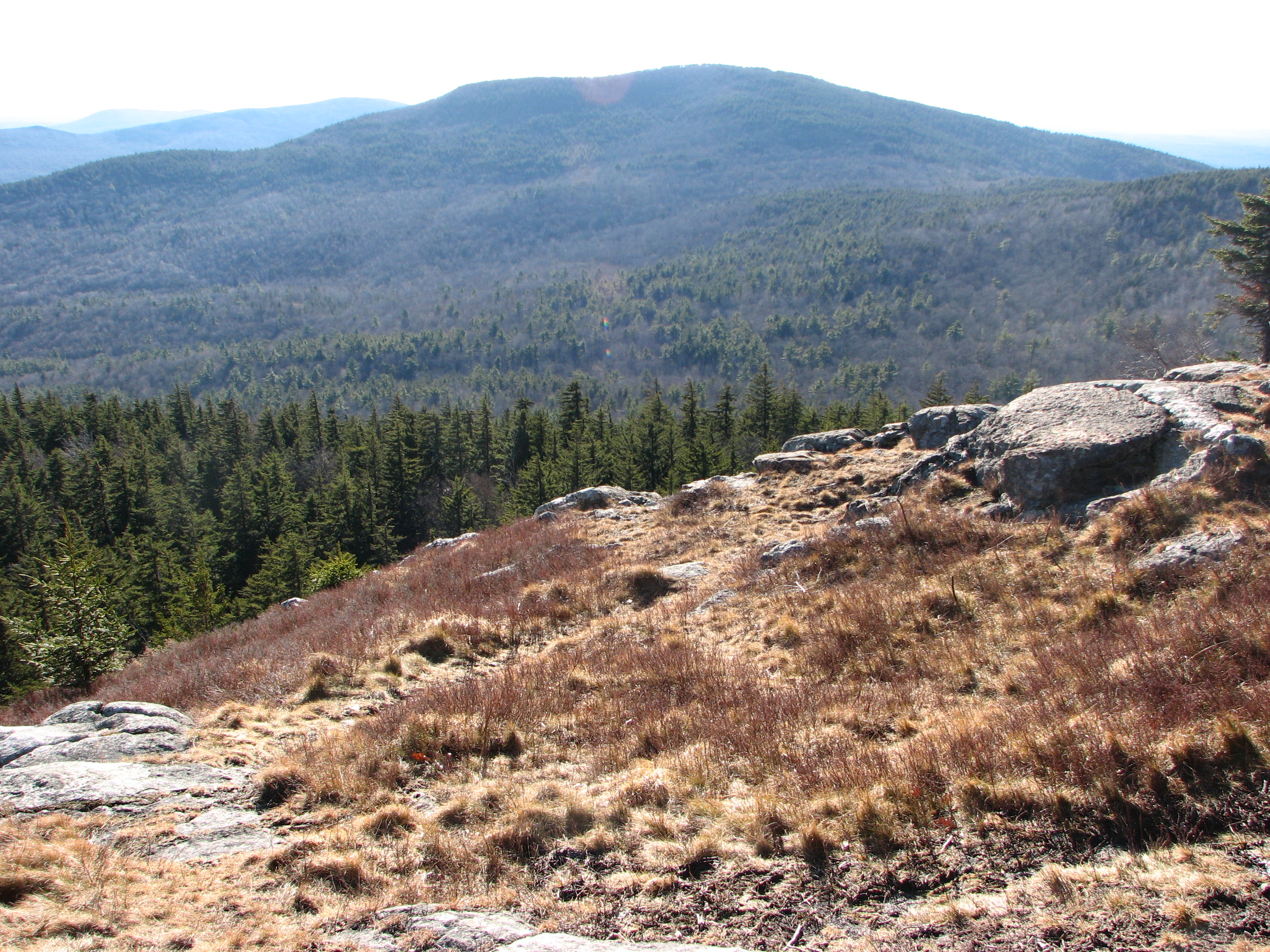

- Location within the United States
- Location: Hillsborough County, New Hampshire, United States
- Nearest city: Peterborough, New Hampshire
- Coordinates: 42.88341°N 71.86618°W
- Area: 1,672 acres (6.77 km^{2})
- Established: 1972
- Governing body: U.S. Fish and Wildlife Service
- Website: Wapack National Wildlife Refuge

Wapack National Wildlife Refuge is a National Wildlife Refuge of the United States located in southern New Hampshire. It was the state's first refuge and was established through a donation by Lawrence and Lorna Marshall in 1972. The 1,672-acre (677 ha) refuge is located about 20 miles (32 km) west of Nashua, New Hampshire and encompasses the 2,278-foot (694 m) North Pack Monadnock Mountain.

A 3-mile (5 km) segment of the 21-mile (34 km) Wapack Trail passes through the refuge and provides wide views of the surrounding mountains.

The refuge lies in the towns of Greenfield, Lyndeborough, and Temple, and is administered by the Parker River National Wildlife Refuge in Newburyport, Massachusetts.

== Nature ==
The refuge protects diverse habitat types, including northern hardwood-conifer, hemlock-hardwood, and spruce-fir forests and woodlands, oldfields, scrub-shrub habitat, and rock ledges with talus.

=== Birds ===
The refuge is a popular hawk migration area and provides nesting habitat for numerous migratory songbirds such as the American tree sparrow, Swainson's thrush, magnolia warbler, crossbills, pine grosbeaks and white-throated sparrow.

Other birds observed on the refuge during a 2002 breeding season survey:

- Ovenbird
- Hermit thrush
- Red-eyed vireo
- Canada warbler
- Blackpoll warbler
- Bay-breasted warbler
- Black-throated blue warbler
- Black-throated green warbler
- Blackburnian warbler
- Golden-crowned kinglet
- Scarlet tanager
- Rose-breasted grosbeak
- Yellow-bellied sapsucker
- Red-tailed hawk
- Sharp-shinned hawk
- Peregrine falcon
- Ruffed grouse

=== Mammals ===
The refuge provides habitat for many mammal species, some of which include:

- Red squirrel
- Gray squirrel
- White-footed mouse
- Deer mouse
- Woodland vole
- Porcupine
- Eastern chipmunk
- White-tailed deer
- Moose
- Snowshoe hare
- Bobcat
- Gray fox
- Red fox
- Coyote
- Black bear

=== Reptiles and amphibians ===
Some amphibian species on the refuge:

- Red back salamander
- Red-spotted newt
- American toad
- Spring peeper
- Pickerel frog
- Bullfrog
- Leopard frog
- Painted turtle
- Wood turtle
- Milk snake
- Garter snake
- Ribbon snake

=== Invertebrates ===
Invertebrates on the refuge are a food source for many other animal species. Insects in the area include butterflies, dragonflies, beetles, wasps, and ants.
