= Kidder Mountain =

Mountain in the American state of New Hampshire

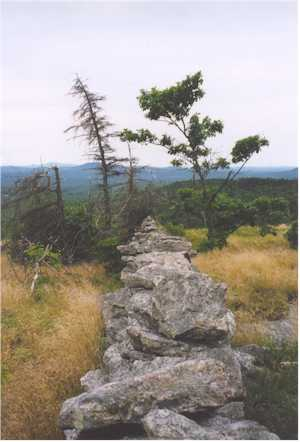
- View from Kidder Mountain

Highest point
- Elevation: 1,805 ft (550 m)
- Prominence: 340 ft (100 m)
- Coordinates: 42°47′03″N 71°52′56″W

Geography
- Location: New Ipswich and Temple, New Hampshire
- Parent range: Wapack Range

Geology
- Rock age: 400 million years
- Mountain type: metamorphic rock

Climbing
- Easiest route: Wapack Trail + Kidder Mountain Trail

Kidder Mountain is a 1,805 feet (550 m) summit located in south-central New Hampshire within the Wapack Range of mountains. It lies within New Ipswich and Temple, New Hampshire just off the 22 mi (35 km) Wapack Trail on a 0.9-mile (1.4 km) side trail. Temple Mountain is located directly to the north along the Wapack ridgeline; Barrett Mountain to the south. The summit of the mountain is mostly open and offers expansive views from old pastures.

The east side of the mountain drains into the Souhegan River watershed, thence into the Merrimack River and Atlantic Ocean; the west side drains into the Gridley River, thence the Contoocook River into the Merrimack River.

The mountain is named in honor of Reuben Kidder, a provincial squire from New Ipswich who represented the local Masonian Proprietors.
