= Barrett Mountain =

Mountain in the American state of New Hampshire

- Location within New Hampshire

Highest point
- Elevation: 1,850 ft (560 m)
- Prominence: 260 ft (79 m)
- Listing: Mountains of New Hampshire
- Coordinates: 42°45′42″N 71°54′55″W

Geography
- Location: New Ipswich, New Hampshire
- Parent range: Wapack Range
- Topo map: USGS Peterborough South

Geology
- Rock age: 400 million years
- Mountain type: metamorphic rock

Climbing
- Easiest route: Wapack Trail

Barrett Mountain is a mountain located in south-central New Hampshire within the Wapack Range of mountains. It lies within the town of New Ipswich and is traversed by the 22-mile (35 km) Wapack Trail. Kidder Mountain is located directly to the north along the Wapack ridgeline; New Ipswich Mountain to the south. The summit of the mountain is mostly wooded. A cross-country ski area occupies the north side of Barrett Mountain.

The east side of the mountain drains into the Souhegan River watershed, to the Merrimack River thence the Atlantic Ocean; the northwest side drains into the Gridley River, to the Contoocook River thence into the Merrimack River; the southwest side drains into the Millers River watershed, to the Connecticut River, thence into Long Island Sound.
