= Crotch (disambiguation) =

Crotch may refer to:

- Crotch, the region of an object where it splits into two or more limbs
- Crotch Blowout, a tear in denim jeans in the crotch area.
- the corner formed by the rails on a carom billiards table
- George Robert Crotch (1842-1874), British entomologist
- William Crotch (1775-1847), English composer, organist and artist
- Crotch Hill, a summit in Maine, United States

== See also ==
- Crotched (disambiguation)
