= Wapack Range =

Mountain range in the northeastern United States

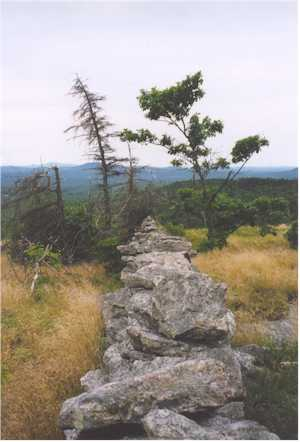
- View from Kidder Mountain

Highest point
- Peak: Pack Monadnock
- Elevation: 2,290 ft (700 m)

Dimensions
- Length: 18 mi (29 km) north-south

Geography
- Country: United States
- States: New Hampshire and Massachusetts
- Range coordinates: 42°48.9′N 71°53.5′W

Geology
- Rock age: Devonian
- Rock type(s): Metamorphic: Littleton Formation

The Wapack Range, sometimes referred to as the Pack Monadnock Range, is a 20-mile-long (32 km) range of mountains in south-central New Hampshire and adjacent Massachusetts, in the northeastern United States. The range is considered very scenic and rugged with many bare summits and ledges ranging from 1,800 to 2,290 feet (550 to 700 m). The 22-mile (35 km) Wapack Trail, one of the oldest interstate hiking trails in the United States, traverses it. The Wapack Range is also the northern terminus of the 90-mile (140 km) Midstate Trail.

The range, composed of heavily metamorphosed schist and quartzite, is oriented north–south and is located in the towns of New Ipswich, Temple, Sharon, Peterborough, and Greenfield, New Hampshire; and in Massachusetts, the towns of Ashburnham and Ashby.

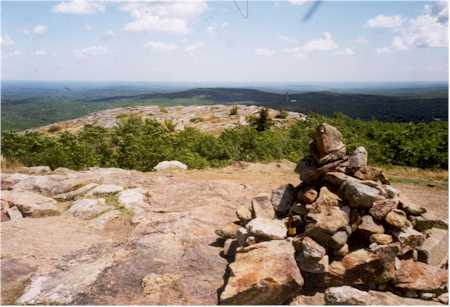
Mount Watatic summit

Notable peaks include, from south to north, Mount Watatic, Pratt Mountain, New Ipswich Mountain, Barrett Mountain, Kidder Mountain, Temple Mountain, Pack Monadnock and North Pack Monadnock.

Significant parcels on the Wapack Range have been conserved as state parks, state forests, or properties managed by non-profit land conservation organizations. Miller State Park, the oldest state park in New Hampshire, is located on Pack Monadnock. A defunct ski area on Temple Mountain was acquired by the state of New Hampshire in 2006 and is also slated for state park status. Windblown Ski Area, on and around Barrett Mountain, was one of the oldest operating cross country ski areas in the United States. Conservation efforts on Mount Watatic have resulted in the protection of the mountain from recent attempts to blast a communications tower road to the summit and open the mountain to housing development on the location of another former ski area. The non-profit Friends of the Wapack have been involved in conservation of the range since 1985.
