= Pratt Mountain =

Mountain in the American state of New Hampshire

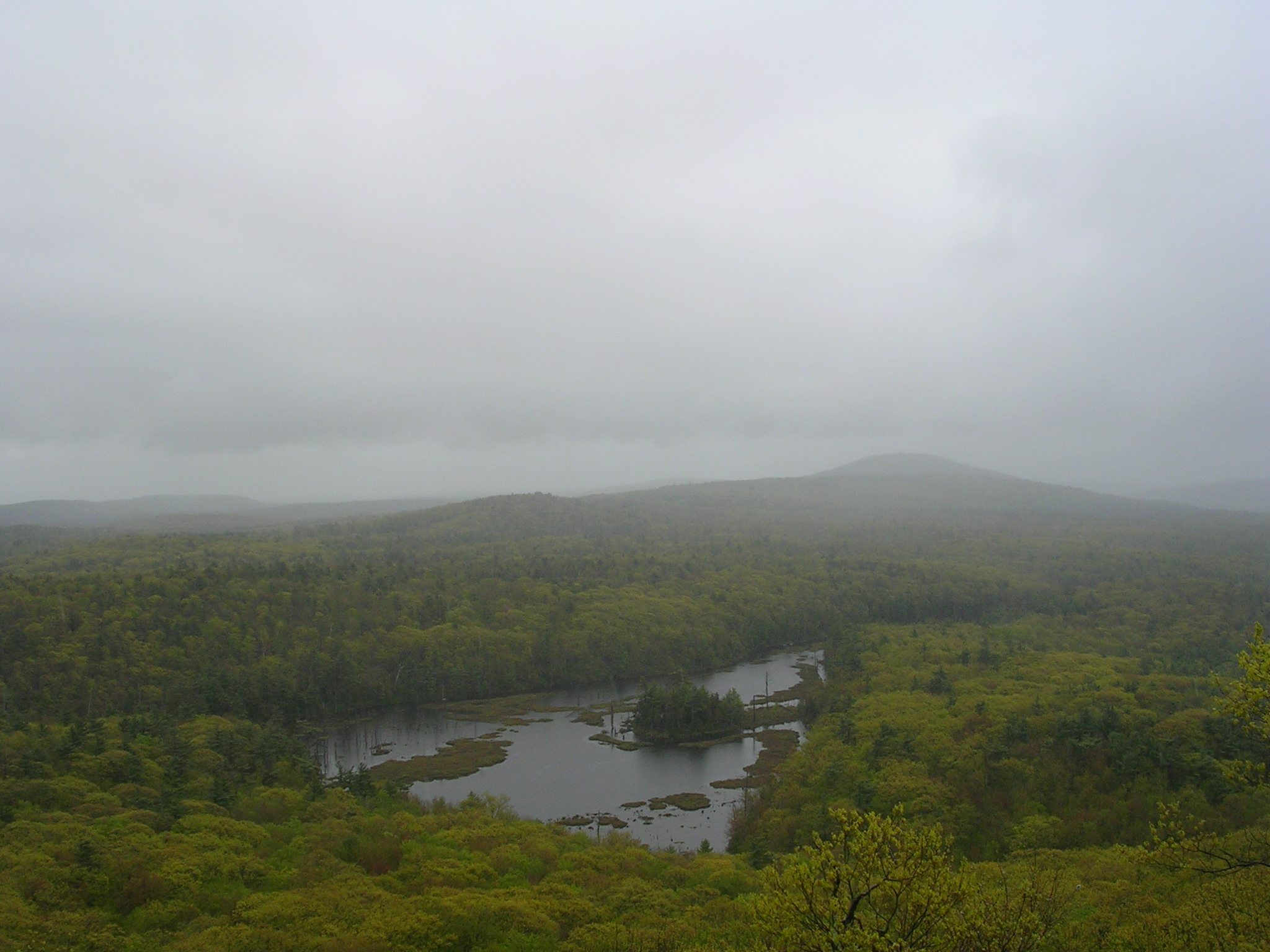
- View of Binney Pond from the top of Pratt Mountain

Highest point
- Elevation: 1,817 ft (554 m)
- Prominence: 167 ft (51 m)
- Coordinates: 42°43′57″N 71°55′10″W

Geography
- Location: New Ipswich, New Hampshire
- Parent range: Wapack Range

Geology
- Rock age: 400 million years
- Mountain type: metamorphic rock

Climbing
- Easiest route: Wapack Trail

Pratt Mountain is a 1,817 feet (554 m) summit within the Wapack Range of mountains in south-central New Hampshire, United States. It is situated within the town of New Ipswich, and is traversed by the 22 mi (35 km) Wapack Trail. The subordinate peak, Stony Top, with an elevation of 1,760 feet (540 m), forms the mountain's northern shoulder. Pratt Mountain offers expansive views which can be enjoyed from rocky ledges along its ridgeline.

New Ipswich Mountain is located directly to the north along the Wapack ridgeline; to the southeast rise Binney Hill 1,441 feet (439 m), Emerson Hill 1,551 feet (473 m), Nutting Hill 1,620 feet (490 m), and Mount Watatic, the southern terminus of the Wapack Range.

The east side of the mountain drains into the Souhegan River watershed, to the Merrimack River thence the Atlantic Ocean; the west and south sides drain into the Millers River watershed, to the Connecticut River, thence into Long Island Sound. Binney Pond, located in Binney Pond State Forest along the Wapack ridgecrest between Pratt Mountain and Binney Hill, is known for a biodiversity of rare plants and salamanders.
