= Gridley River =

- Location within New Hampshire Location within the United States

Location
- Country: United States
- State: New Hampshire
- County: Hillsborough
- Towns: New Ipswich, Sharon, Peterborough

Physical characteristics
- Source: Wapack Range
  - location: New Ipswich
  - coordinates: 42°46′45″N 71°53′28″W
  - elevation: 1,480 ft (450 m)
- Mouth: Contoocook River
  - location: Peterborough
  - coordinates: 42°50′8″N 71°58′36″W
  - elevation: 818 ft (249 m)
- Length: 6.3 mi (10.1 km)

The Gridley River is a 6.3-mile-long (10.1 km) river in southern New Hampshire in the United States. It is a tributary of the Contoocook River, part of the Merrimack River watershed. Most of the river's length is within the town of Sharon.

The Gridley River begins in the northwestern corner of New Ipswich, New Hampshire, on the western slopes of Kidder Mountain in the Wapack Range. The small stream flows west into Tophet Swamp, where it picks up a tributary from the northeast. The river soon enters the town of Sharon and heads north through wetlands and intervening steep patches, reaching the Contoocook River just within the southwestern corner of Peterborough.

== See also ==
- List of rivers of New Hampshire
