= North Pack Monadnock =

Mountain in New Hampshire

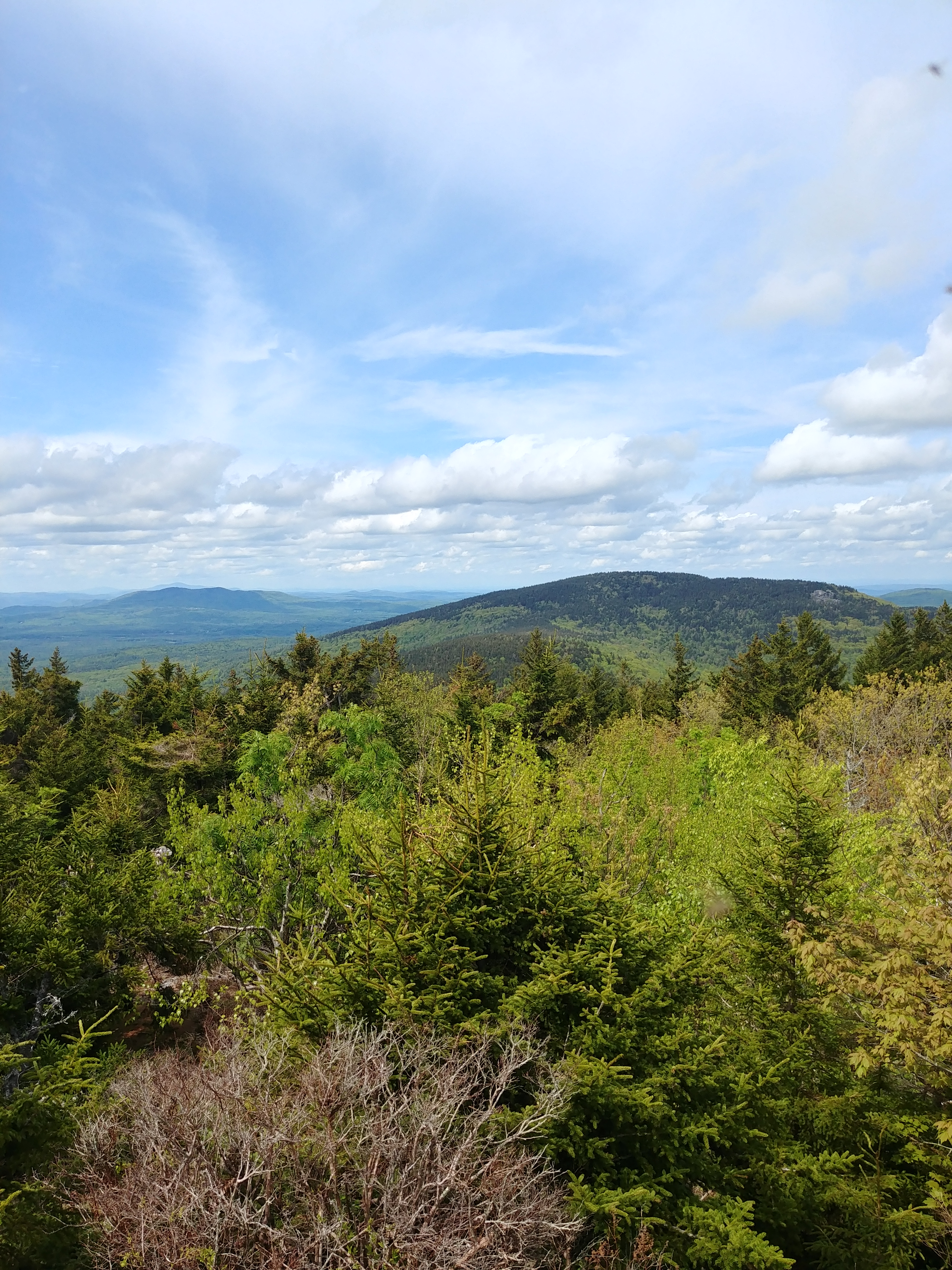
- North Pack Monadnock (on the right) viewed from Pack Monadnock. The mountain in the distance to the left is Crotched Mountain.

Highest point
- Elevation: 2,276 ft (694 m)
- Prominence: 538 ft (164 m)
- Coordinates: 42°53′10″N 71°51′56″W

Geography
- Location: Greenfield, New Hampshire
- Parent range: Wapack Range

Geology
- Rock age: 400 million years
- Mountain type(s): monadnock; metamorphic rock

Climbing
- Easiest route: Wapack Trail

North Pack Monadnock or North Pack Monadnock Mountain is a 2,276-foot (694 m) monadnock in south-central New Hampshire, at the northern end of the Wapack Range of mountains. It lies within Greenfield and Temple, New Hampshire; the 22-mile (35 km) Wapack Trail traverses the mountain. Ledges on the summit offer long views north to the White Mountains and west to Mount Monadnock. Pack Monadnock Mountain is directly to the south along the Wapack ridgeline. The upper elevations of the mountain are within Miller State Park.

The east side of the mountain drains into the Souhegan River watershed, thence into the Merrimack River and Atlantic Ocean; the west side drains into the Contoocook River, thence into the Merrimack River.

== Etymology ==
"Monadnock" is derived from the Abenaki language, and indicates a mountain surrounded by relatively flat terrain. According to local tradition, the word "pack" is an Abenaki word for "little". Thus "Pack Monadnock" (Little Monadnock) refers to its relationship to the higher Mount Monadnock, 3,165 feet (965 m), 11 miles (18 km) to the west. It should not be confused with the similarly named peak Little Monadnock Mountain, 17 miles (27 km) to the west.
