= New Ipswich Mountain =

Mountain in the American state of New Hampshire

- Location within New Hampshire

Highest point
- Elevation: 1880+ ft (573+ m) NGVD 29
- Prominence: 480 ft (150 m)
- Coordinates: 42°44′44″N 71°54′58″W

Geography
- Location: New Ipswich, New Hampshire
- Parent range: Wapack Range
- Topo map: USGS Ashburnham

Geology
- Rock age: 400 million years
- Mountain type: metamorphic rock

Climbing
- Easiest route: Wapack Trail

New Ipswich Mountain is a summit within the Wapack Range of mountains in south-central New Hampshire, United States. It lies within the town of New Ipswich and is traversed by the 22-mile (35 km) Wapack Trail. Barrett Mountain is located directly to the north along the Wapack ridgeline; Stony Top, a subordinate peak of Pratt Mountain, lies to the south. The summit of the mountain is mostly wooded, but a number of rocky ledges below the summit offer views of the surrounding countryside.

The east side of the mountain drains into the Souhegan River watershed, to the Merrimack River thence the Atlantic Ocean; the west side drains into the Millers River watershed, to the Connecticut River, thence into Long Island Sound.
