= Miller State Park =

State park in Hillsborough County, New Hampshire

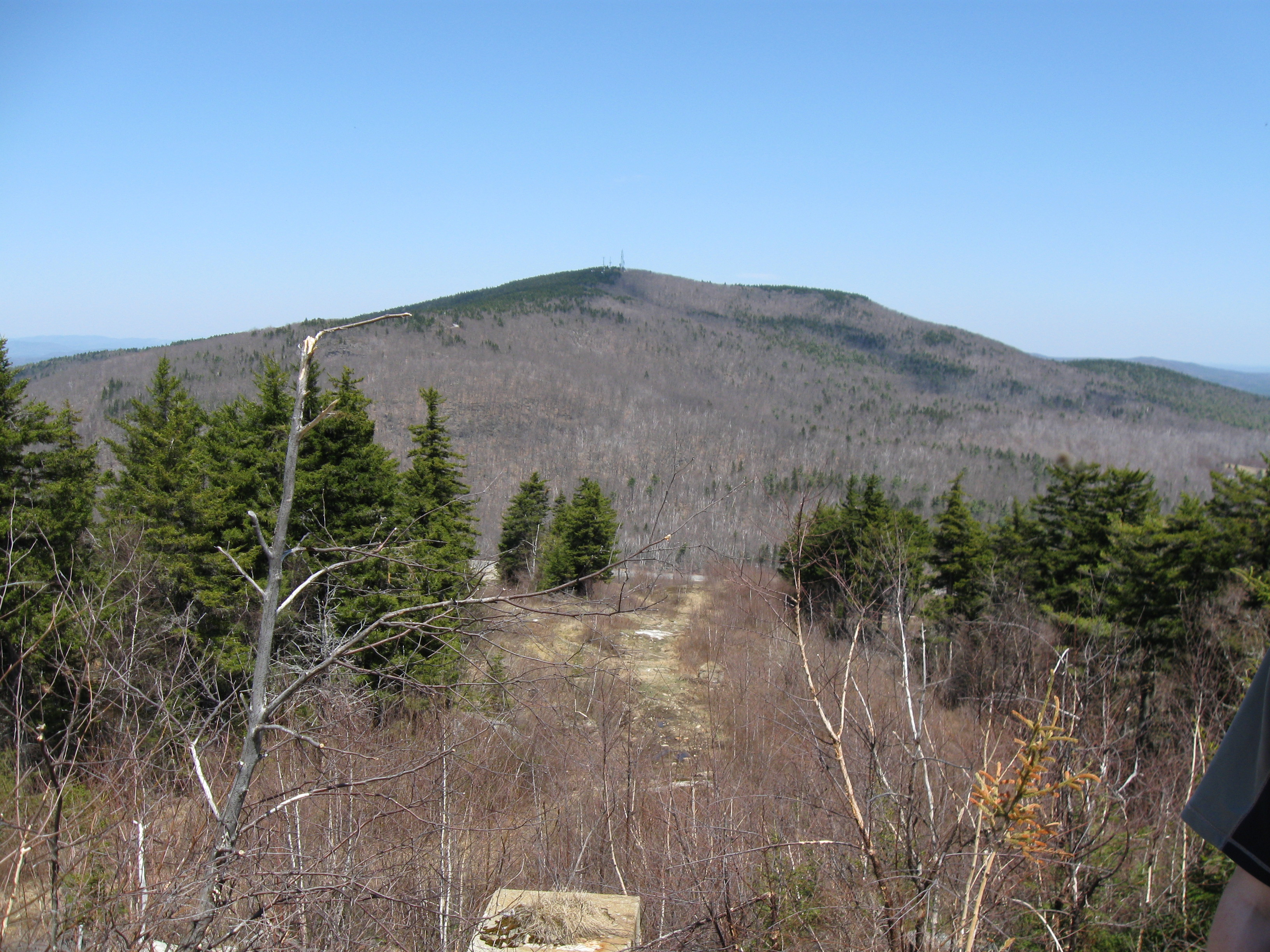
- Pack Monadnock
- Interactive map of Miller State Park
- Location: Peterborough and Temple, New Hampshire, United States
- Coordinates: 42°51′34″N 71°52′59″W
- Area: 533.4 acres (215.9 ha)
- Elevation: 1,932 feet (589 m)
- Established: 1891
- Administrator: New Hampshire Division of Parks and Recreation
- Website: Official website
New Hampshire State Parks
Miller State Park
- Location within New Hampshire

Miller State Park is the oldest state-run park in New Hampshire, a state in the New England region of the United States. It is located in the towns of Peterborough and Temple, and is centered on Pack Monadnock, a 2,290-foot (700 m) mountain.

== Description ==
The 533-acre (216 ha) park was established in 1891 when 3 acres (1.2 ha) atop Pack Monadnock were donated to New Hampshire. The name Pack comes from an Indian word meaning "little" and is used in comparison to nearby Mount Monadnock. Pack Monadnock has a paved auto road to the top and is the former site of two hotels. It has a renovated fire tower at the summit which is staffed seasonally.

The park has expanded over the years with land donations and purchases. Until 1901, cattle were driven by foot from Massachusetts farms for summer grazing on open pasture extending nearly to the summit. Virtually all the pastures are now overgrown with forest, as little farming is done in the region.

The park is named for James Miller, a Peterborough native who was a brigadier general in the United States Army during the War of 1812 and became the first governor of Arkansas Territory.

The area is popular with hikers. The Wapack Trail runs through the park, crossing over Pack Monadnock.

The mountain is the home of the Pack Monadnock Raptor Observatory, which draws regional birdwatchers who observe the autumn hawk migration.

In 2007, the state created Temple Mountain State Reservation on the south side of NH Route 101 across from the Miller State Park entrance, when it bought 325 acres (1.32 km^{2}) around the closed Temple Mountain Ski Area.

== See also ==
- New Hampshire Historical Marker No. 270: Miller State Park, New Hampshire's First State Park
