= Crotched Mountain Rehabilitation Center =

Rehabilitation center in Greenfield, New Hampshire, U.S.

Coordinates: 42°58′20.52″N 71°52′24.33″W

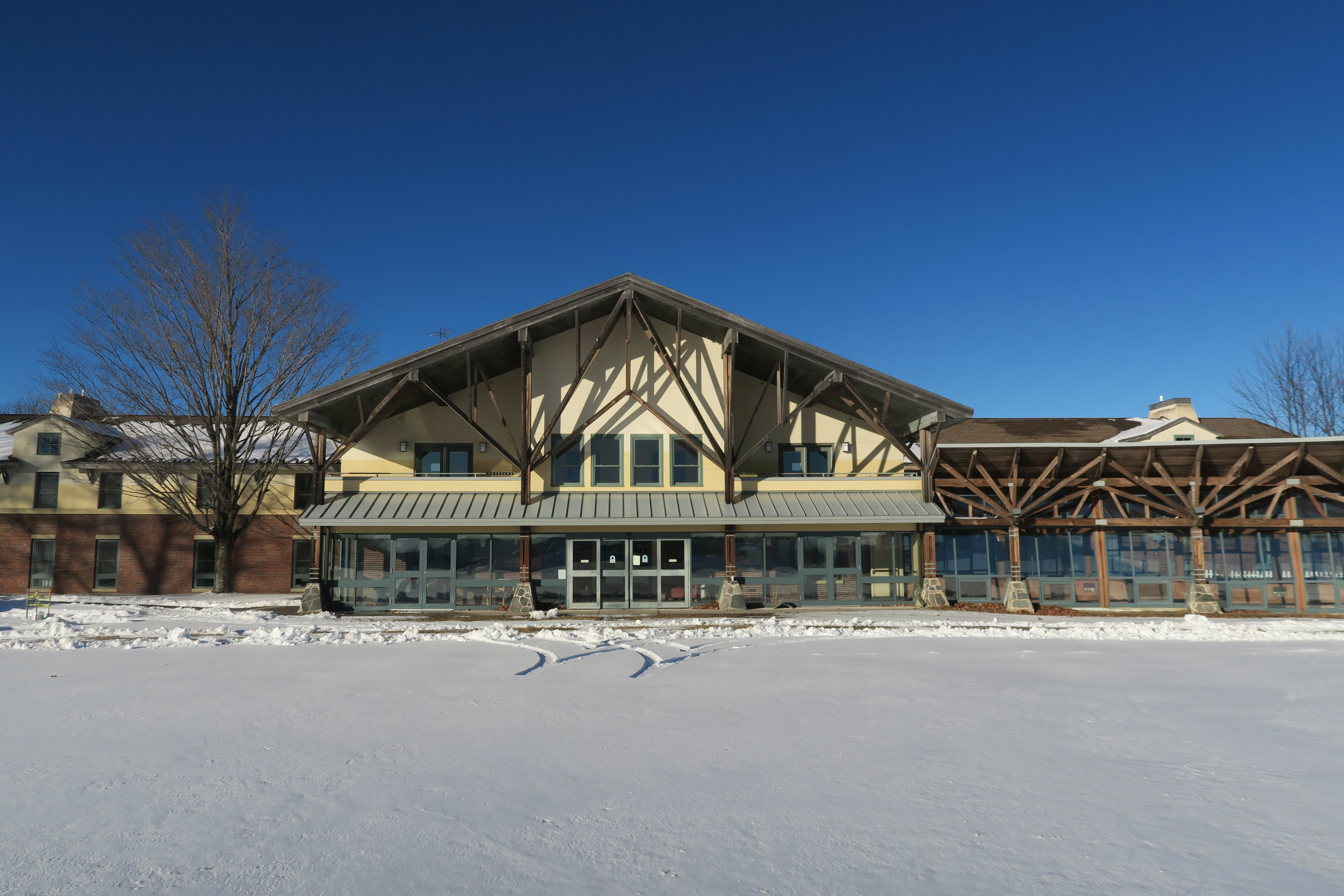
Crotched Mountain Rehabilitation Center

Crotched Mountain Rehabilitation Center was a facility in Greenfield, New Hampshire, United States. It was established as a rehabilitation center for children with polio and later expanded to include a school for the deaf, a residential school for students with complex disabilities, and adult residential programs.

In 2020, the center ceased operations after the Greenfield campus was sold. It is now operated by Seven Hills Foundation as Crotched Mountain School & Village. The Crotched Mountain Foundation, which previously owned the rehabilitation center, shifted its focus to community-based programs and is currently based in Manchester, New Hampshire.

== History ==
=== Foundation ===
The Crotched Mountain Rehabilitation Center was established in 1953 by Harry Gregg, the father of New Hampshire Governor Hugh Gregg and grandfather of U.S. Senator Judd Gregg. The creation of the Crotched Mountain Rehabilitation Center was the result of a project by Harry Gregg and others to build a center for the rehabilitation of children.

Harry Gregg met Dr. Ezra A. Jones, the first orthopedic physician in New Hampshire, around 1920. Jones established clinics in the major cities of New Hampshire as demand for orthopedic specialists increased due to injuries from World War I.

In 1936, Gregg and Jones founded the New Hampshire Society for Crippled Children. Funded primarily by the Easter Seals drive, the society publicized the need for more extensive treatment programs for disabled people and lobbied for favorable legislation. The society made small grants to support the medical and rehabilitation needs of children and adults.

Several years after the establishment of the society, Jones expressed a desire for a hospital for sustained treatment in New Hampshire, using modern methods to address serious conditions. Gregg had a desire to build a "crippled children's camp" in Greenfield, New Hampshire, and these ideas were melded together. Gregg chose Greenfield because he had founded a summer camp for underprivileged children from Nashua on the north shore of Sunset Lake. The camp was called the Nashua Fresh Air Camp, and it eventually served more than 350 children each summer in two-week sessions before it closed in the 1970s. Through his experience with the camp, Gregg had learned of a large parcel of level land on a shoulder of Crotched Mountain, the Russell Dairy Farm. In the fall of 1942, the Society for Crippled Children authorized an expenditure of up to $7,500 to purchase the land at Crotched Mountain for the site of a "crippled children's camp." A little more than two months later, Gregg reported to the society's executive committee that he had completed the purchase using funds from two bequests.

A "dream picture" created by a Boston architect was presented to the 1944 annual meeting and included medical, therapeutic, and educational facilities, as well as a farm with a barn. All buildings would be connected by walks and ramps for residents using wheelchairs, crutches, and braces. The community also included stores, residences, and churches for residents.

In 1944, Gregg described his plan to make this vision a reality to the society's executive committee. He announced that a friend was willing to establish a foundation and contribute $350,000. Gregg recommended a fundraising goal of $250,000 for "a camp and fireproof convalescent hospital." In addition, an endowment of $1 million should be raised to provide operating income.

The choice of the location in remote and rural Greenfield was not without controversy. Many thought it should be located in one of the larger cities in the state, Manchester or Nashua. Gregg consulted with experts in the field, including Dr. Howard A. Rusk, who was the chair of physical rehabilitation medicine established at the New York University Medical Center. Rusk and other experts agreed that an institution serving the entire state would benefit from an independent location not affiliated with any hospital. The society affirmed its choice. Fundraising continued throughout the late 1940s and early 1950s to raise the funds needed for the construction of the campus and the endowment. Gregg was able to generate publicity for his campaign in state, regional, and national newspapers which supported the fundraising. Construction began in 1950, and the center opened in 1953.

The facility originally treated people with polio, cerebral palsy, spina bifida, and other physical and neurological disabilities. A center for adult rehabilitation opened in 1961, and a rehabilitation center for adults with brain injuries opened in 1986. It operated a school for the deaf from 1955 to the early 1970s.

=== 21st century ===
In 2004, the New Hampshire Society for Crippled Children unveiled the first wheelchair-accessible treehouse in New Hampshire.

In 2007, Linda Bevins, one of the center's employees, was accused of embezzling $1.3 million from the Crotched Mountain Foundation. Bevins was accused of creating and paying fictitious employees, and then channeling the money to herself. The theft was discovered during an internal balancing of accounts, when an irregularity was noticed. A federal indictment was handed down in March 2008. A civil suit filed by the foundation resulted in a judgment of more than a million dollars against Bevins and her daughter, Holly Sears.

In November 2022, Seven Hills Foundation announced its acquisition of the Greenfield campus to open Crotched Mountain School & Village. The school is operated as part of Seven Hills New Hampshire.
