= Temple Mountain (New Hampshire) =

Mountain in New Hampshire, United States

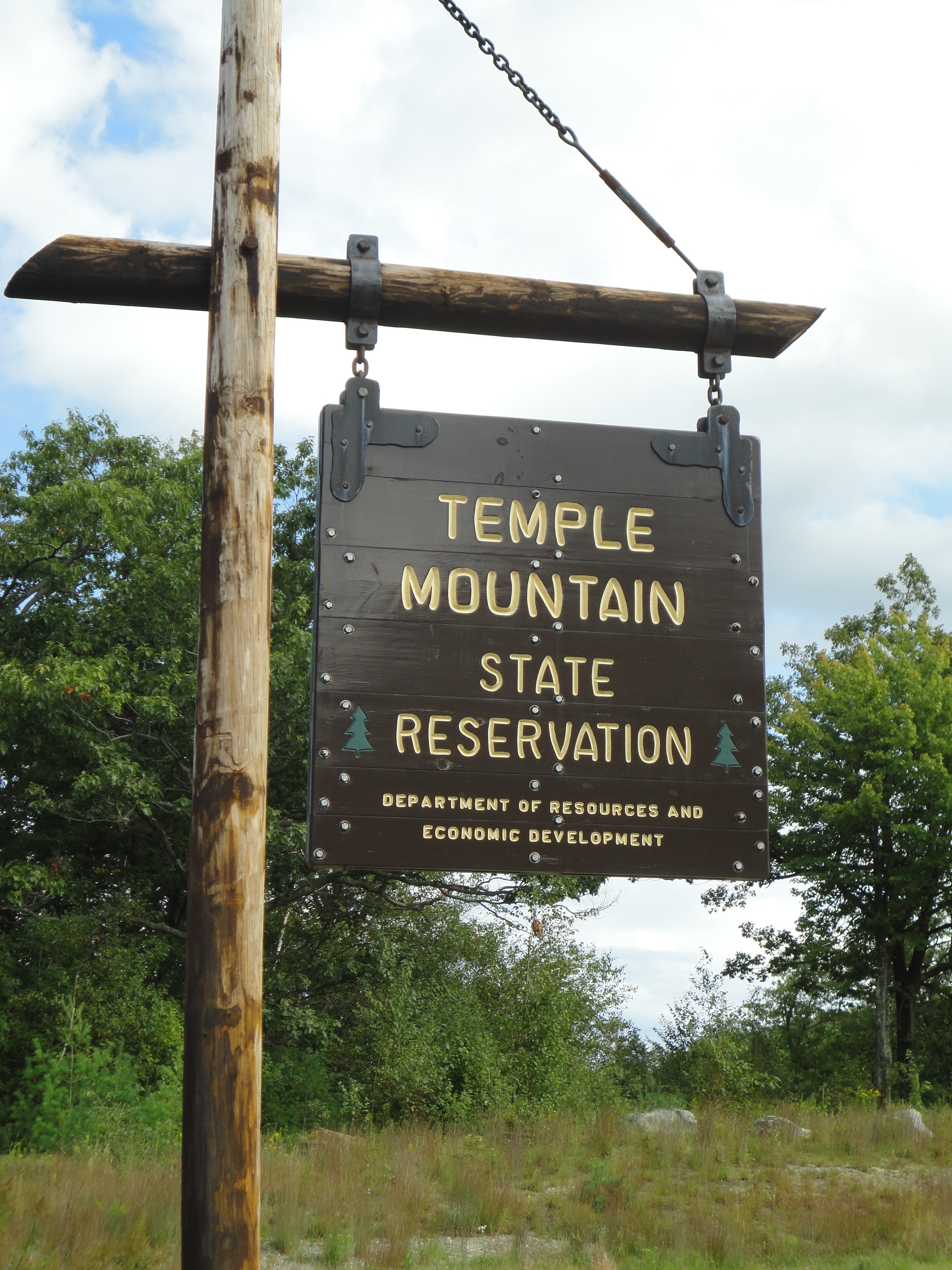
- State reservation area sign on Temple Mountain, September 2012

Highest point
- Elevation: 2,045 ft (623 m)
- Prominence: 568 ft (173 m)
- Coordinates: 42°49′39″N 71°53′07″W

Geography
- Location: Sharon and Temple, New Hampshire
- Parent range: Wapack Range

Geology
- Rock age: 400 million years
- Mountain type(s): ridge; metamorphic rock

Climbing
- Easiest route: Wapack Trail

Temple Mountain is a 2,045-foot (623 m) mountain in the Wapack Range in Hillsborough County, New Hampshire, United States.

The mountain lies within the towns of Sharon, Temple and Peterborough. The 22-mile (35 km) Wapack Trail traverses the mountain. The northern face includes the state-owned 350-acre (1.4 km^{2}) Temple Mountain Reservation Area, formerly Temple Mountain Ski Area. The mountain is 3.5 miles (5.6 km) long and has several summits; three of them are named: Burton Peak 2,010 feet (610 m), Whitcomb Peak 1,710 feet (520 m), and Holt Peak, the high point.

Pack Monadnock Mountain is located directly to the north along the Wapack ridgeline; Kidder Mountain to the south. Scattered ledges along the ridgeline offer long vistas west to Mount Monadnock and south along the spine of the Wapack Range; the abandoned ski area on the north side of the mountain offers 270-degree views.

The east side of the mountain drains into the Souhegan River watershed, thence into the Merrimack River and Atlantic Ocean; the west side drains into the Contoocook River, thence into the Merrimack River.

== See also ==
- List of mountains of New Hampshire
