= Crotched =

Crotched may refer to:

- Crotched Mountain, New Hampshire, United States
- Crotched Lake, Nova Scotia, Canada
