= Pack Monadnock =

Mountain in New Hampshire, United States

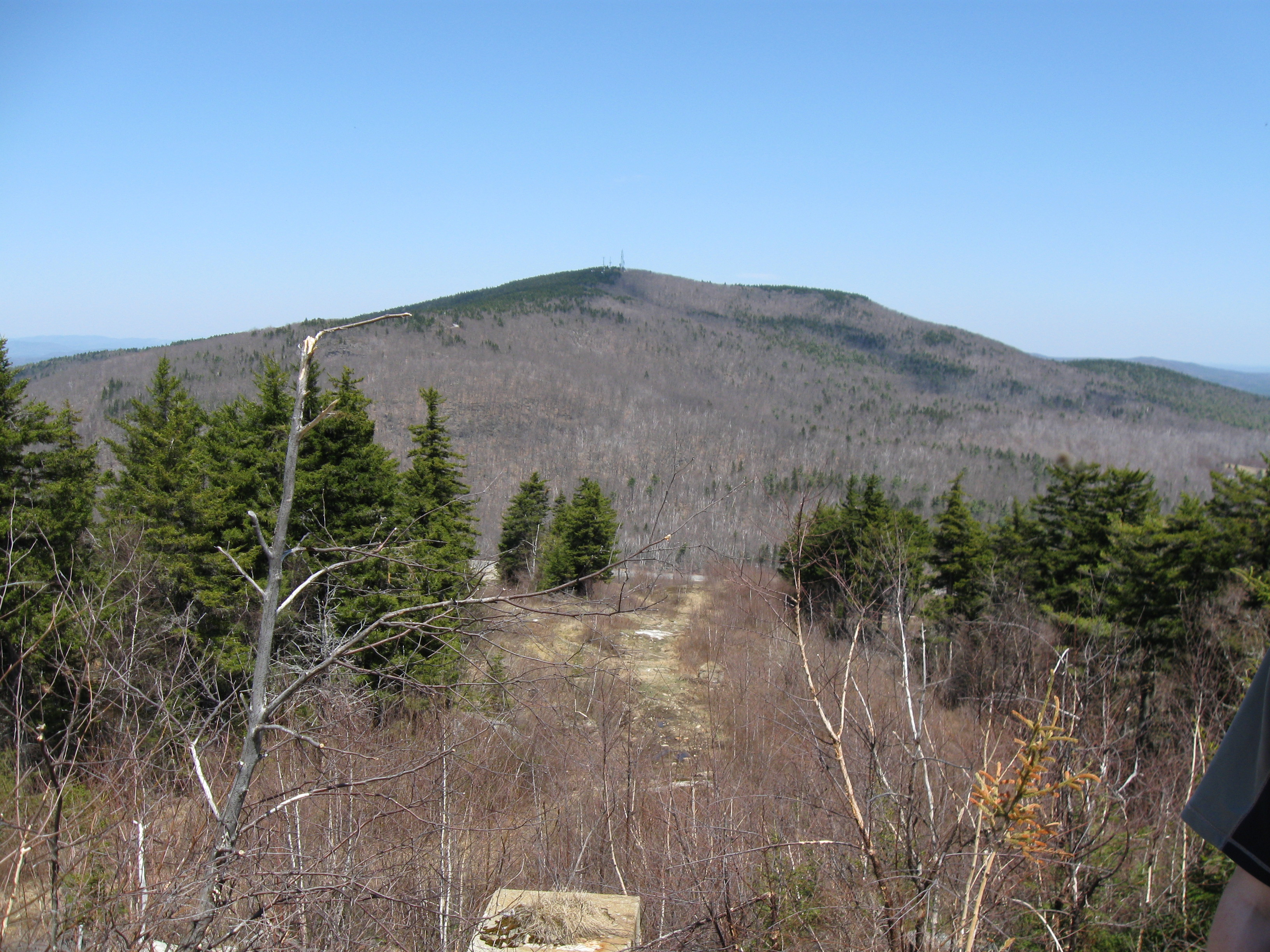
- Pack Monadnock from Temple Mountain

Highest point
- Elevation: 2,290 ft (700 m)
- Prominence: 1,257 ft (383 m)
- Coordinates: 42°51′46″N 71°52′43″W

Geography
- Location: Peterborough and Temple, New Hampshire
- Parent range: Wapack Range

Geology
- Rock age: 400 million years
- Mountain type(s): monadnock; metamorphic rock

Climbing
- Easiest route: auto road (seasonal)

Pack Monadnock or Pack Monadnock Mountain 2,290 feet (700 m), is the highest peak of the Wapack Range of mountains and the highest point in Hillsborough County, New Hampshire. The mountain, a monadnock, is located in south-central New Hampshire within the towns of Peterborough and Temple. The 22 mi (35 km) Wapack Trail and a number of shorter trails traverse the mountain. A firetower and ledges on the summit offer long views north to the White Mountains, west to Mount Monadnock, and south into Massachusetts. North Pack Monadnock Mountain is located directly to the north along the Wapack ridgeline; Temple Mountain to the south.

Much of the mountain is located within Miller State Park. A seasonal automobile road ascends from the south to a picnic area at the summit. The summit also has a staffed air-pollution monitoring station.

The east side of the mountain drains into the Souhegan River watershed, thence into the Merrimack River and Atlantic Ocean; the west side drains into the Contoocook River, thence into the Merrimack River.

The mountain is the home of the Pack Monadnock Raptor Observatory, where birdwatchers from around the region gather for the annual hawk migration. During the peak migration season in September, birdwatchers search the sky for kettles of hundreds of hawks swarming above rising thermals as they migrate south.

The mountain's summit at Peterborough is also home to the transmitter of two Manchester-market radio stations: NOAA Weather Radio station WNG575 and 92.1 WDER-FM, which airs a Christian talk and preaching format.

== Etymology ==
According to local tradition, the word "pack" is a Native American word for "little" and "monadnock" is used to describe an isolated mountain summit; thus "Little Monadnock" refers to its relationship to the higher Mount Monadnock, 3,165 feet (965 m), 11 miles (18 km) to the west. Pack Monadnock should not be confused with Little Monadnock Mountain, located 17 miles (27 km) to the west.
