= Temple Mountain Ski Area =

Former ski area in New Hampshire, United States

Coordinates: 42°50′48″N 71°53′07″W

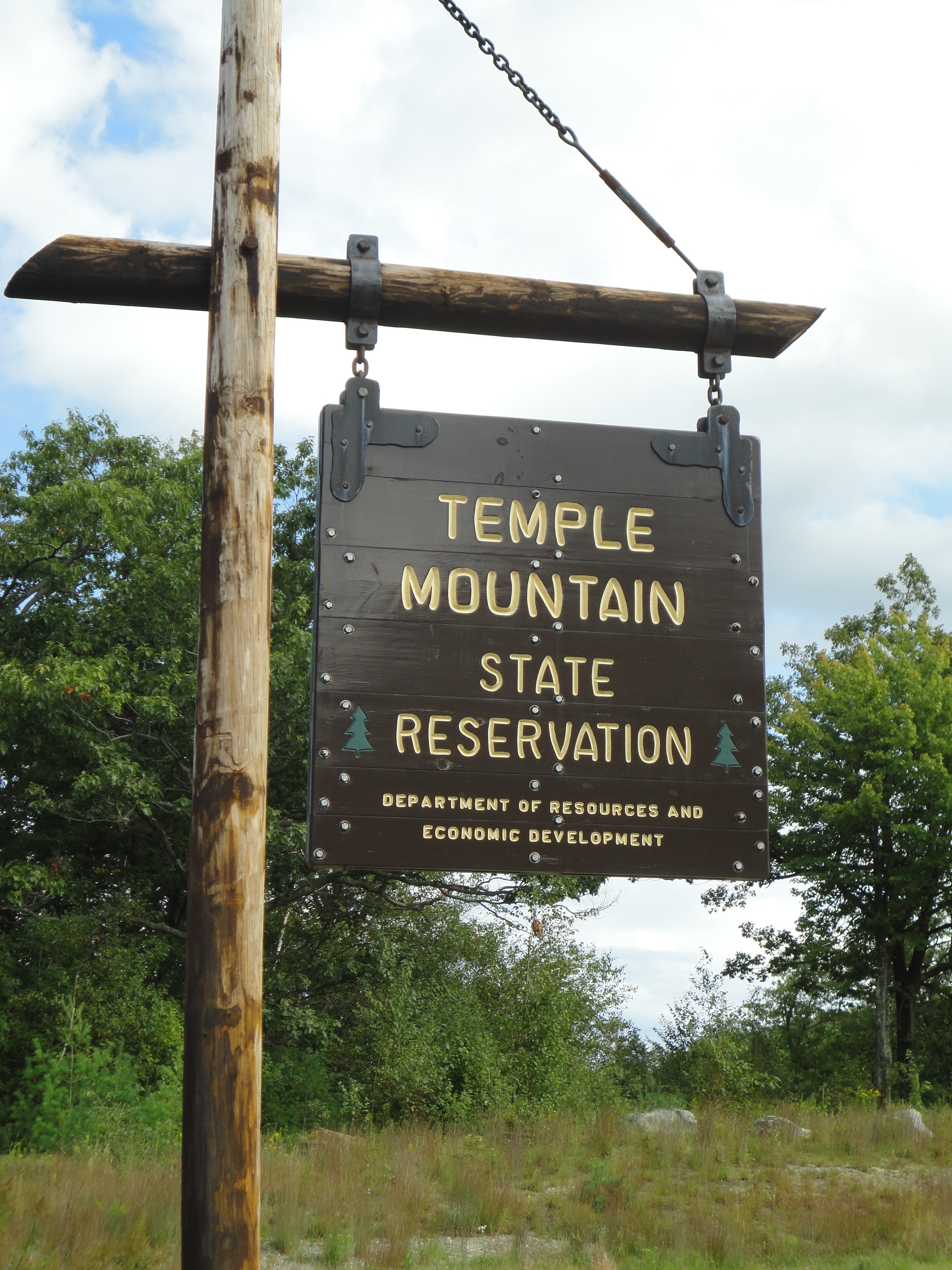
Current sign of state reservation area

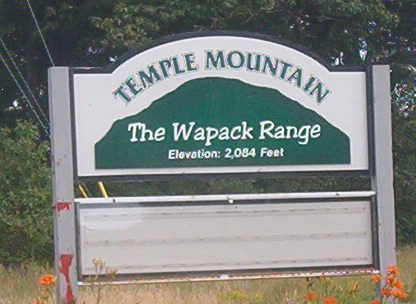
Former sign outside of the former Temple Mountain Ski Area

Temple Mountain Ski Area was a downhill, or alpine, ski area that operated from 1938 until 2001 on Temple Mountain in the U.S. state of New Hampshire. During peak operation, the ski area featured a quad chairlift, a double chairlift, and multiple T-bars and rope tows. Like many other small ski areas in the country, it closed due to poor weather, rising costs, and changing recreational habits.

Its entrance was located on New Hampshire Route 101, straddling the border of the towns of Temple and Peterborough.

Originally begun as Temple Mountain Ski Forest in 1936, it was opened as a ski area with a rope tow in 1938 by Charles Beebe. Beebe installed the first platter lift in 1958 and a T-bar in 1965, but did not install snowmaking. Poor weather and competition led the Beebes to sell the area in 1984, which led to its first chairlift and snowmaking. The 350-acre (1.4 km^{2}) site, of which about 60 acres (240,000 m^{2}) was used for the ski area, struggled under several owners and closed after the 2000–01 season.

John and Connie Kieley of Temple Highlands LLC purchased the ski area in 2003. The quad chairlift was sold to Nashoba Valley Ski Area in Massachusetts, while the double was sold to SkyTrans Manufacturing and was later used as a ride at the Milwaukee Zoo. In December 2007, the State of New Hampshire, with some federal funds, purchased the 352 acres (142 ha) for a reported $1 million, creating the Temple Mountain State Reservation.
