= Mount Watatic =

Mountain in Ashburnham and Ashby, Massachusetts, U.S.

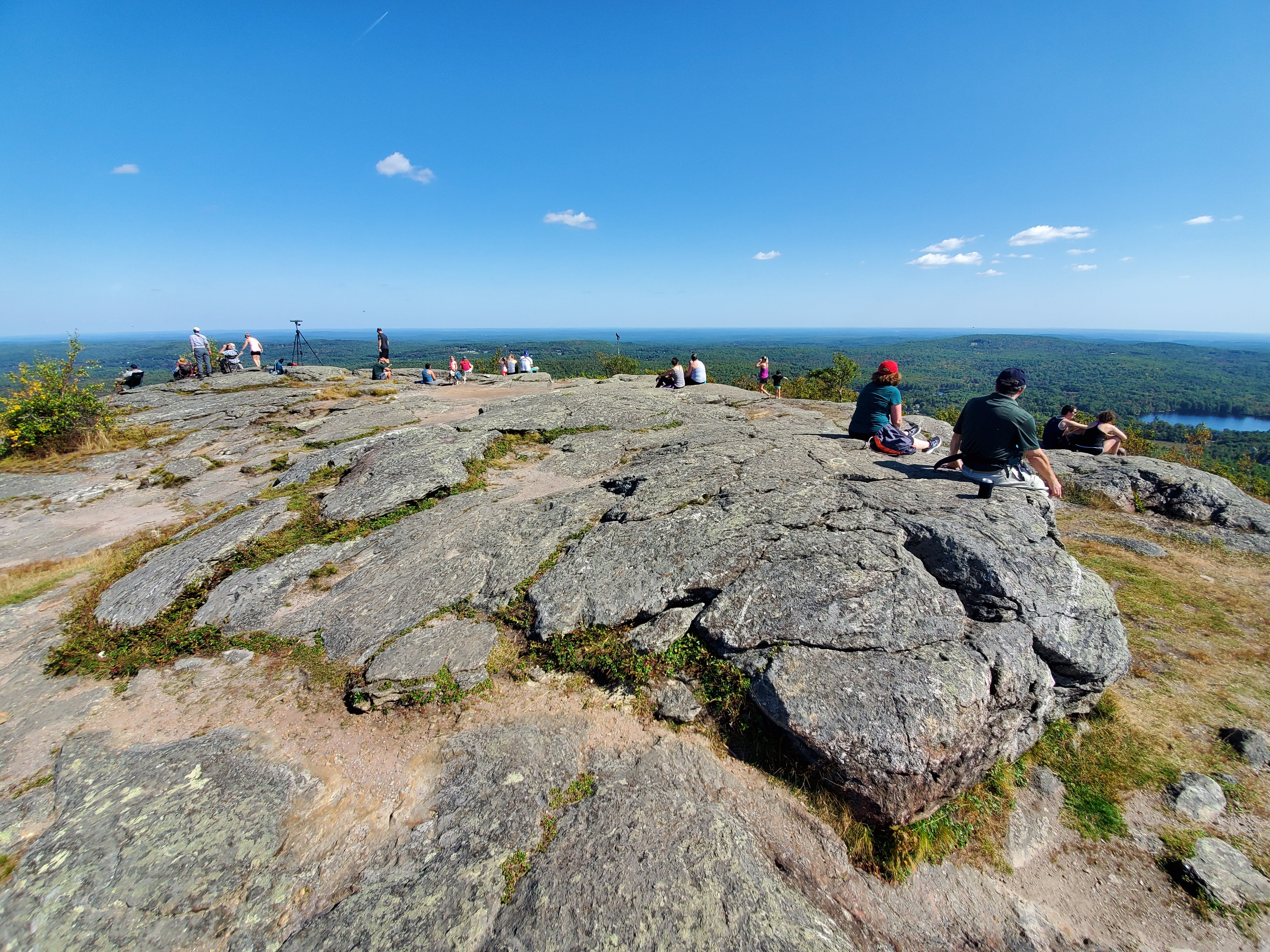
- Summit of Mount Watatic.

Highest point
- Elevation: 1,831 ft (558 m)
- Prominence: 502 ft (153 m)
- Coordinates: 42°41′48″N 71°53′33″W

Geography
- Location: Ashburnham, Massachusetts, United States and Ashby, Massachusetts, United States
- Parent range: The Wapack Range

Geology
- Rock age: 400 million years
- Mountain type(s): monadnock; metamorphic rock

Mount Watatic is a 1,832-foot (558 m) monadnock located just south of the Massachusetts–New Hampshire border, in the United States, at the southern end of the Wapack Range. It lies in Ashburnham, Massachusetts and Ashby, Massachusetts. The 22-mile (35 km) Wapack Trail and the 92-mile (148 km) Midstate Trail both cross the mountain.

The name is probably a corruption of the Native American term Wetu-tick, "wigwam brook", and probably applied first to the nearby large stream and thereafter to the mountain and the pond.

The east and south side of the mountain drains into the Souhegan River watershed, to the Merrimack River thence the Atlantic Ocean; the west and north sides drain into the Millers River watershed, to the Connecticut River, thence into Long Island Sound.

Mount Watatic was the site of a ski area that operated from the 1930s until 1984. An attempt to reopen the ski area in 1988 failed.

Mount Watatic was also once home to state fire tower #31 that looked out over central Massachusetts, until its removal in 1996. Phone lines to the tower ran up the Ashby and Ashburnham sides of the mountain over the years.

== Conservation ==
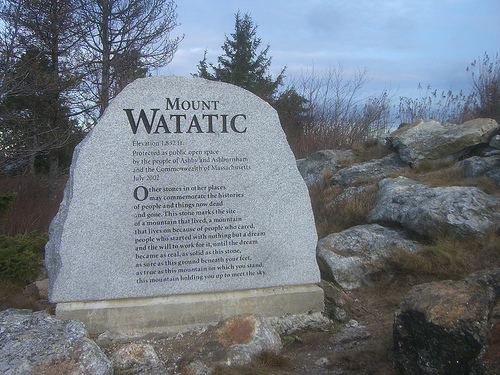
An engraved stone at the summit of Mount Watatic.

In 2000, the summit of the mountain was sold to Industrial Communications and Electronics for the development of a 150-foot (46 m) cellular telephone tower and a road to the summit. In 2002, prior to development of the communications tower, the mountain was purchased for $2,500,000 by the Ashby Land Trust, the Town of Ashby, the Ashburnham Conservation Trust, the Town of Ashburnham, Mass Dept of Fish and Wildlife and Mass Dept of Conservation and Recreation. Unfortunately by this point a road had already been blasted into the ski area (back) side of the mountain, making several of the still maintained ski trails unusable. The purchase resulted in the permanent protection of approximately 281 acres (1.14 km^{2}) of the mountain, including the summit, as conservation land. In July 2010, Mount Watatic was named one of the "1000 Great Places in Massachusetts" by the State Commission of Massachusetts. On September 21, 2022, North County Land Trust acquired 186 acres of the south slope of Watatic. The Division of Fisheries and Wildlife (MassWildlife) then purchased it from them for $995,000 in July 2022.

== Watatic Ski Area ==
Mount Watatic was once home to a small ski area that operated from the 1930s until its closure in 1984. The ski area started with a small rope tow and expanded to the summit some time later thought to be in the 1960s. At its height, the ski area had snow making and night skiing, impressive features at the time. The area also included multiple rope tows, two T-bars and double chairs that eventually replaced the old rope tows and one T-bar. In 1984 the ski area eventually succumbed to competition and its poor location in relation to major roads. There was one attempt to reopen the ski area in 1988 under the name Ski Adventure that was in the end unsuccessful. The land of the former ski area is currently held in conservation and is accessible to the public for hiking. Hikers can find the old grown in trails and remnants of the area's structures still visible on the back side of the mountain.
