= Greenfield, New Hampshire =

Town in New Hampshire, United States

- Town
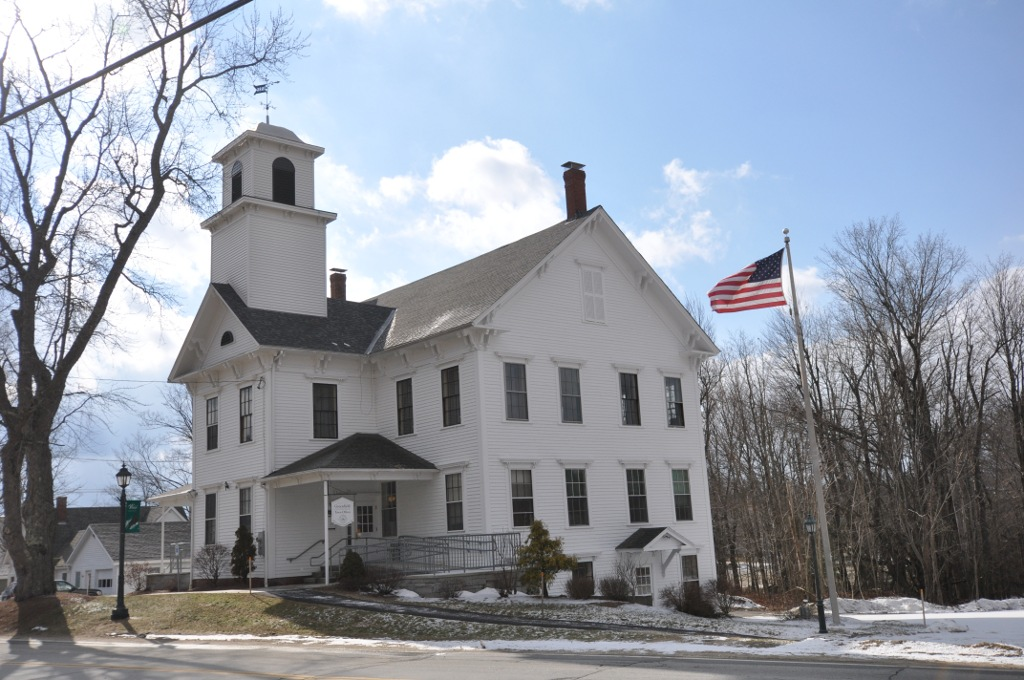
- The former elementary school, listed on the New Hampshire State Register of Historic Places, now serves as the Town Office.

- Seal

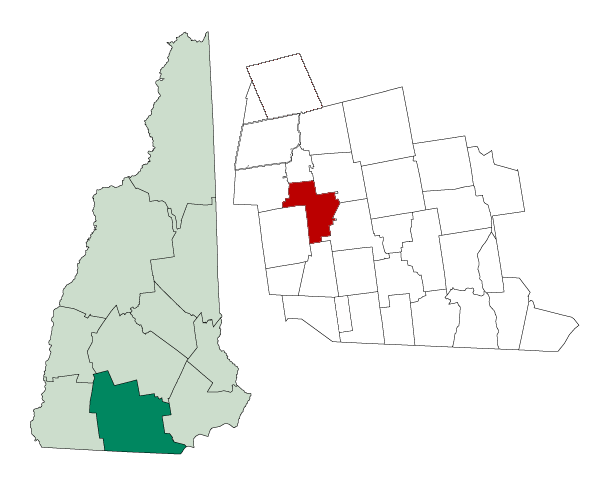
- Location in Hillsborough County, New Hampshire
- Coordinates: 42°56′42″N 71°53′16″W
- Country: United States
- State: New Hampshire
- County: Hillsborough
- Incorporated: 1791

Government
  - Selectboard: Thomas Bascom; Mike Borden; George Rainier
  - Town Administrator: Wendy Drouin (interim)

Area
  - Total: 26.8 sq mi (69.3 km^{2})
  - Land: 26.2 sq mi (67.9 km^{2})
  - Water: 0.54 sq mi (1.4 km^{2}) 2.04%
- Elevation: 827 ft (252 m)

Population (2020)
  - Total: 1,716
  - Density: 66/sq mi (25.3/km^{2})
- Time zone: UTC-5 (Eastern)
  - Summer (DST): UTC-4 (Eastern)
- ZIP code: 03047
- Area code: 603
- FIPS code: 33-31540
- GNIS feature ID: 873611
- Website: www.greenfield-nh.gov

Greenfield is a town in Hillsborough County, New Hampshire, United States. The population was 1,716 at the 2020 census. Greenfield is home to the Crotched Mountain Rehabilitation Center, to Greenfield State Park, and to part of the Wapack Trail.

== History ==
Originally known as "Lyndeborough Addition", the area was first settled by the Lynde family in 1753. Separated from the nearest church and school by the Monadnock hills, the residents successfully petitioned to form a new town in 1791, using the name "Greenfield" to highlight the area's level, fertile ground.

In 1953, the Crotched Mountain Rehabilitation Center began operation in Greenfield. Established by Harry Gregg, the facility on Crotched Mountain originally treated for polio, cerebral palsy, spina bifida and other physical and neurological disabilities. A center for adult rehabilitation opened in 1961, and a rehabilitation center for adults with brain injuries in 1986. The complex today provides service to over 2,000 children and adults. In 2004, it unveiled the first wheelchair-accessible tree house in New Hampshire.

Greenfield is home to the Yankee Siege, considered the most powerful (current) trebuchet in the world, which has participated in the annual World Championship Punkin' Chunkin' Contest in Sussex County, Delaware, since 2004. The farthest official toss is 1,897 feet (578 m) as of 2008, although there are unofficial reports of 2,000-to-2,300-foot (610 to 700 m) throws as of 2009.

== Geography ==
According to the United States Census Bureau, the town has a total area of 26.8 square miles (69.3 km^{2}), of which 26.2 square miles (67.9 km^{2}) are land and 0.54 square miles (1.4 km^{2}) are water, comprising 2.04% of the town. The southeastern part of Greenfield is drained by Stony Brook, flowing southeast to the Souhegan River in Wilton, while the western part, including the town center, is drained by the Contoocook River and its tributary Otter Brook; the Contoocook forms the northwestern border of the town, where it passes through Powder Mill Pond. The northeastern corner of the town is drained by Rand Brook, a tributary of the South Branch of the Piscataquog River. Greenfield lies fully within the Merrimack River watershed. North Pack Monadnock, elevation 2,276 feet (694 m) above sea level, is the northernmost summit of the Wapack Range and the highest point in Greenfield, located in the extreme southern part of the town.

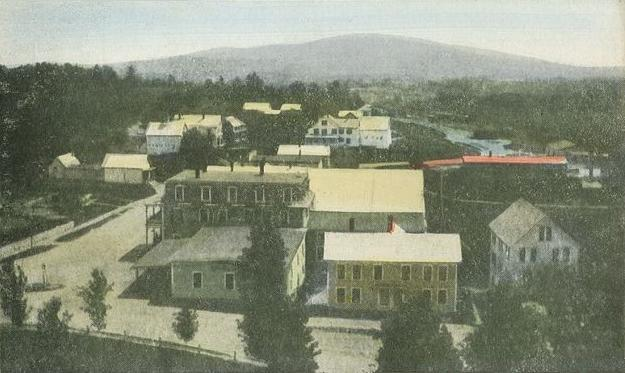
Bird's-eye view in 1907

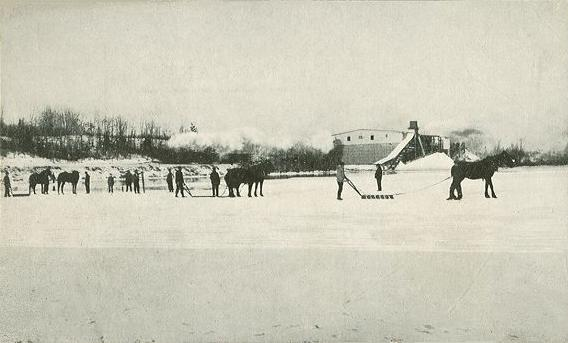
Harvesting ice c. 1907

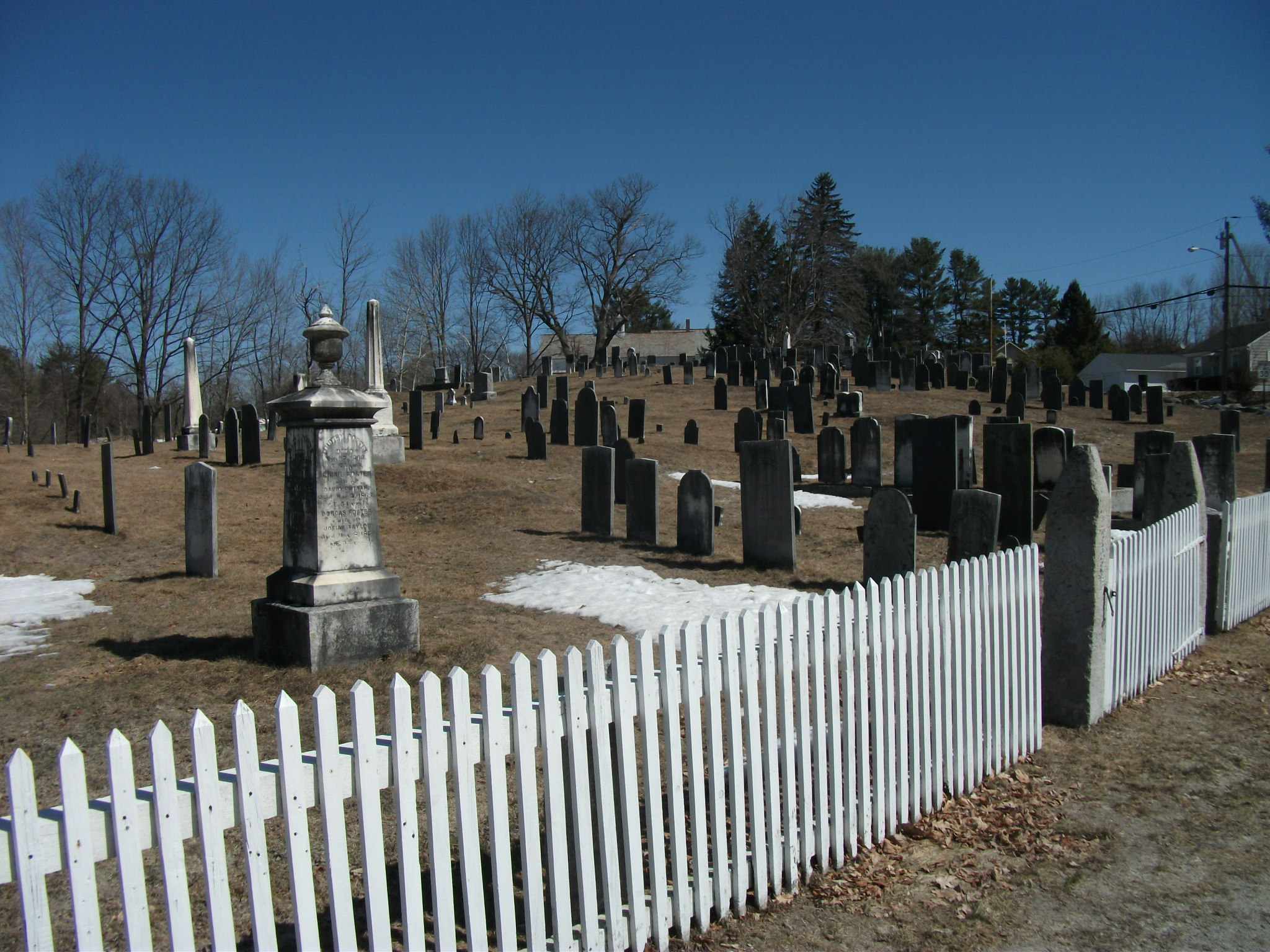
Town graveyard

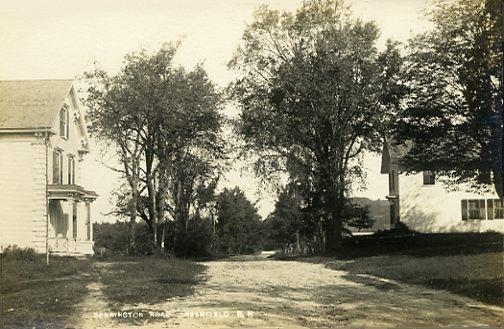
Bennington Road c. 1912

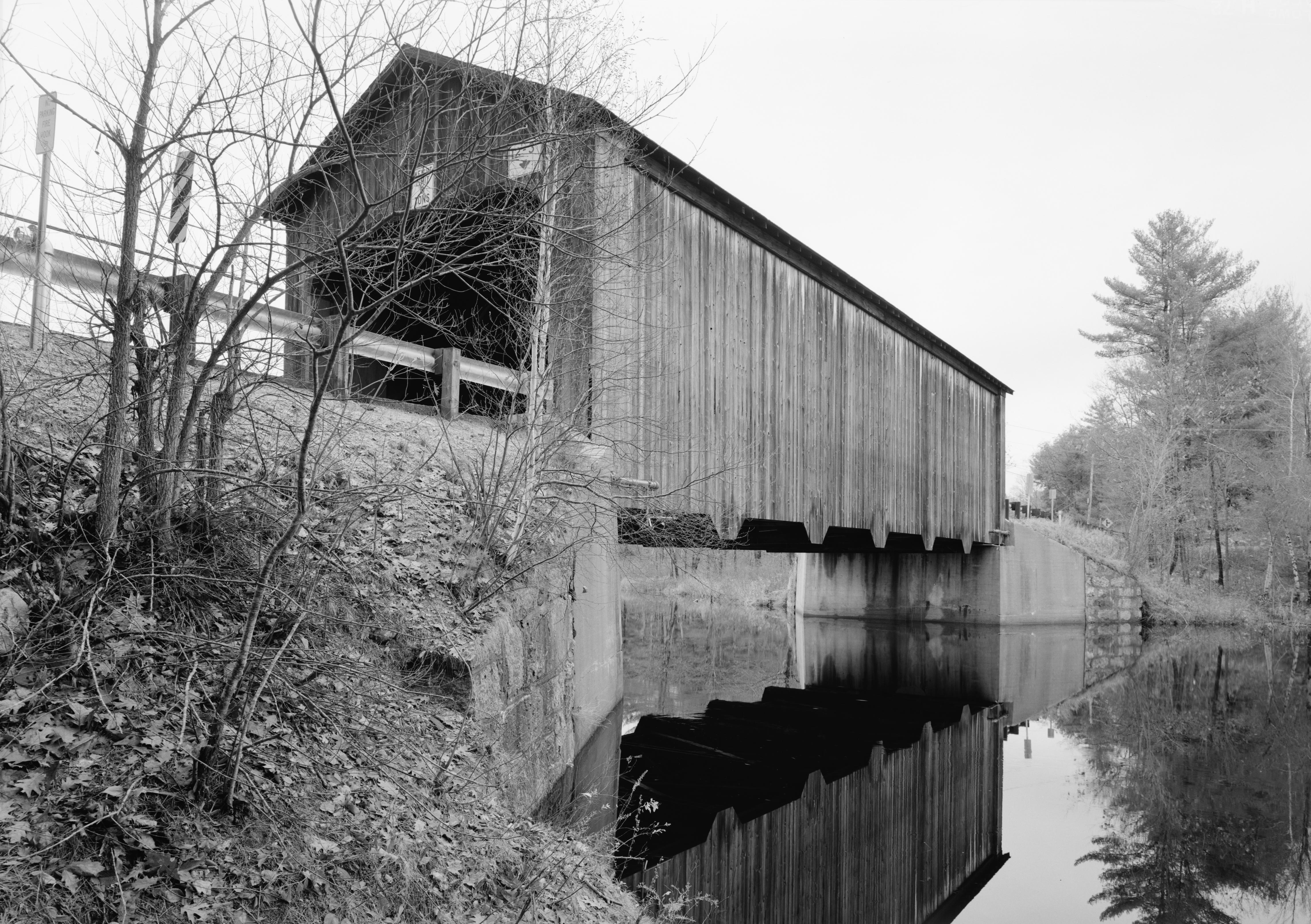
Old Hancock-Greenfield Bridge

=== Adjacent municipalities ===
- Bennington, New Hampshire (north)
- Francestown, New Hampshire (northeast)
- Lyndeborough, New Hampshire (east)
- Temple, New Hampshire (south)
- Peterborough, New Hampshire (southwest)
- Hancock, New Hampshire (west)

== Demographics ==
Historical population
Census	Pop.	Note	%±
1800	934		—
1810	980		4.9%
1820	974		−0.6%
1830	946		−2.9%
1840	834		−11.8%
1850	716		−14.1%
1860	692		−3.4%
1870	527		−23.8%
1880	649		23.1%
1890	607		−6.5%
1900	605		−0.3%
1910	574		−5.1%
1920	417		−27.4%
1930	394		−5.5%
1940	407		3.3%
1950	430		5.7%
1960	538		25.1%
1970	1,058		96.7%
1980	972		−8.1%
1990	1,519		56.3%
2000	1,657		9.1%
2010	1,749		5.6%
2020	1,716		−1.9%
2024 (est.)	1,696		−1.2%
U.S. Decennial Census

As of the census of 2000, there were 1,657 people, 563 households, and 405 families residing in the town. The population density was 65.1 inhabitants per square mile (25.1/km^{2}). There were 640 housing units at an average density of 25.1 per square mile (9.7/km^{2}). The racial makeup of the town was 97.28% White, 0.72% African American, 0.84% Native American, 0.24% Asian, 0.48% from other races, and 0.42% from two or more races. Hispanic or Latino of any race were 0.60% of the population.

There were 563 households, out of which 38.9% had children under the age of 18 living with them, 60.0% were married couples living together, 8.0% had a female householder with no husband present, and 27.9% were non-families. 19.5% of all households were made up of individuals, and 4.3% had someone living alone who was 65 years of age or older. The average household size was 2.69 and the average family size was 3.12.

In the town, the population was spread out, with 30.8% under the age of 18, 7.3% from 18 to 24, 32.1% from 25 to 44, 22.8% from 45 to 64, and 7.1% who were 65 years of age or older. The median age was 34 years. For every 100 females, there were 104.1 males. For every 100 females age 18 and over, there were 105.9 males.

The median income for a household in the town was $48,833, and the median income for a family was $56,250. Males had a median income of $36,250 versus $24,438 for females. The per capita income for the town was $19,895. About 2.4% of families and 5.4% of the population were below the poverty line, including 6.9% of those under age 18 and 8.5% of those age 65 or over.
