= Crotch Hill =

Summit in Hancock County, Maine, US

Coordinates: 44°47′02″N 68°16′19″W

Crotch Hill is a summit in Hancock County, Maine, in the United States. With an elevation of 561 feet (171 m), Crotch Hill is the 1656th tallest mountain in Maine.
