= Crotched Mountain =

Mountain in New Hampshire, United States

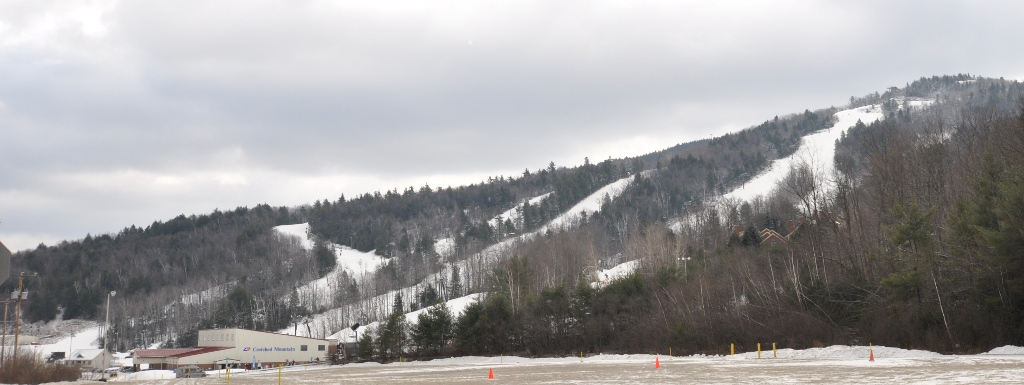

Highest point
- Elevation: 2,063 ft (629 m)
- Coordinates: 42°59′54″N 71°52′25″W

Geography
- Location within New Hampshire
- Location: Hillsborough County, New Hampshire, U.S.
- Topo map(s): USGS Greenfield, Peterborough North, Hillsboro, Deering

Crotched Mountain is a small mountain in western Hillsborough County, New Hampshire, in the United States. The 2,063-foot (629 m) summit of the mountain is in the town of Francestown, while the western slopes of the mountain rise in the town of Bennington, and a long southern ridge of the mountain is in Greenfield. The mountain was named for its appearance. Early settlers thought its V-shaped peaks resembled the fork or "crotch" of a tree.

The Crotched Mountain Ski & Ride occupies the northern slopes of the mountain. It has 25 trails, 5 chairlifts, and 900 feet (270 m) of vertical drop. The Crotched Mountain Rehabilitation Center occupies a portion of the mountain's southern ridge in Greenfield.

The mountain was the site of the world's first wind farm. In 1980, US Windpower installed 20 wind turbines rated at 30 kilowatts each, on the shoulder of Crotched Mountain. The company went out of business and the wind turbines were dismantled years ago.

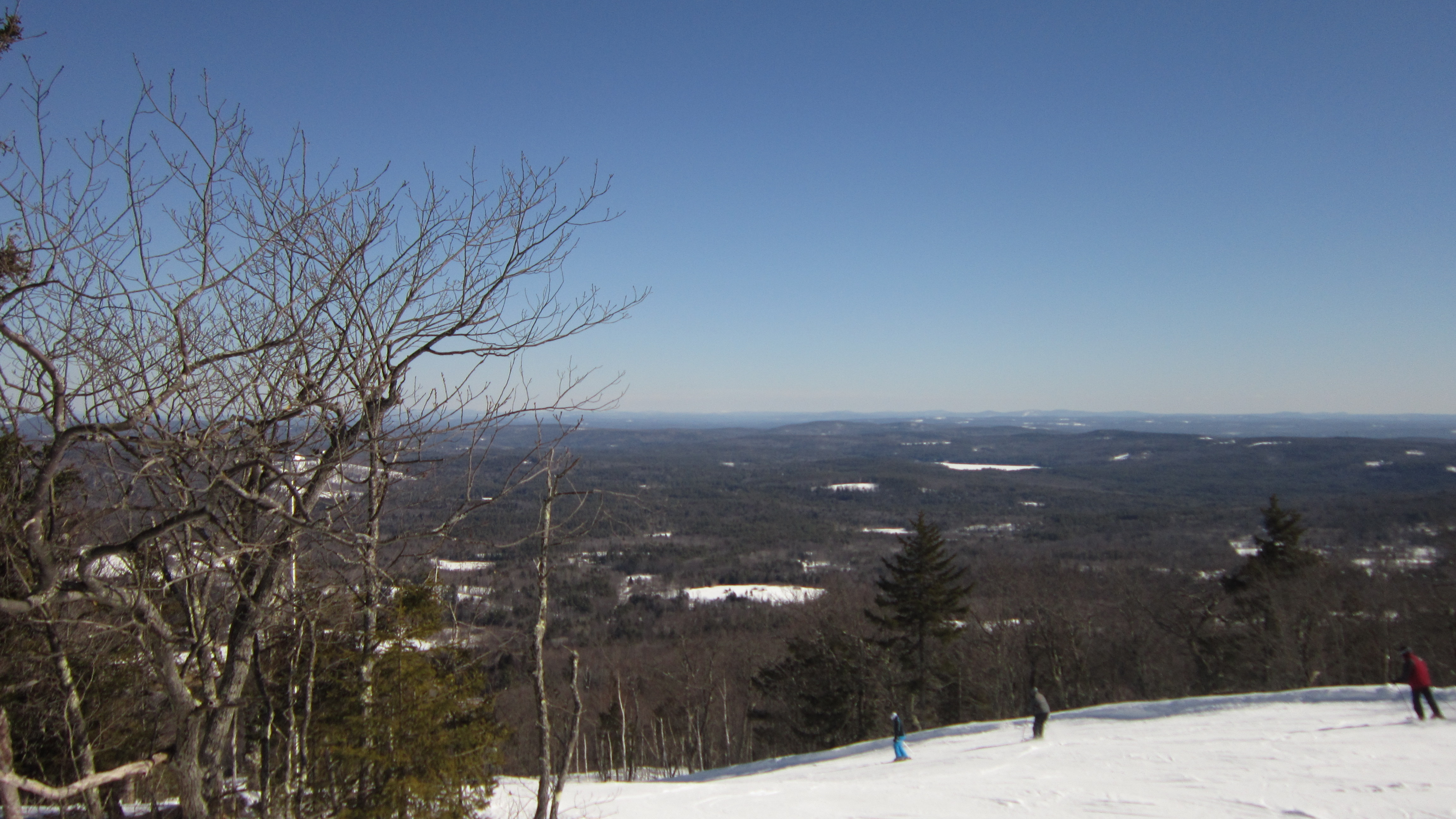
View from near the summit of the mountain, looking southeast
