= Wapack Trail =

Hiking trail in New Hampshire

Coordinates: 42°48′54″N 71°53′30″W

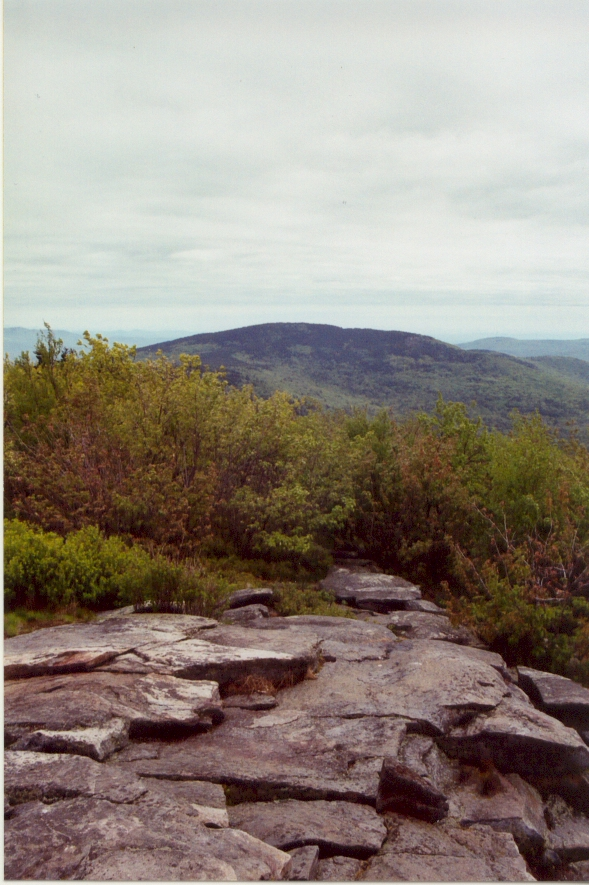
- View from Pack Monadnock on Wapack Trail
- Length: 21 mi (34 km)
- Location: Worcester County, Massachusetts and Hillsborough County, New Hampshire, U.S.
- Use: hiking, snowshoeing, cross-country skiing, other
- Highest point: Pack Monadnock, 2,288 ft (697 m)
- Lowest point: Spofford Gap, 1,226 ft (374 m)
- Difficulty: easy, with moderately difficult sections
- Season: easiest mid-spring to mid-fall
- Hazards: deer ticks, weather, poison ivy

The Wapack Trail is one of the oldest public, interstate hiking trails in the United States. Opened in 1923, it follows the Wapack Range north-south for 21 miles (34 km), between Mount Watatic in Ashburnham, Massachusetts, and North Pack Monadnock mountain in Greenfield, New Hampshire. It is designed primarily for day use by hikers, with minimal camping facilities.

The trail passes through the Massachusetts towns of Ashburnham and Ashby, and the New Hampshire towns of New Ipswich, Temple, Sharon, Peterborough, and Greenfield. It also goes over Temple Mountain, and through Miller State Park, Binney Hill Wilderness Preserve, and the Wapack National Wildlife Refuge, as well as numerous privately owned parcels of land. In New Ipswich it skirts Windblown Cross-Country Ski Area, which operated for four decades until closing in 2020.

The trail is overseen by Friends of the Wapack, a non-profit group. Aside from upgrading and maintaining the trail, the group is trying to have the entire length preserved from development.

The southern part of the Wapack Trail overlaps with the northern part of the Midstate Trail.

Friends of the Wapack patch

== History ==
The trail was born in a conversation in the summer of 1922 at the Shattuck Inn in Jaffrey, New Hampshire between Allen Chamberlain, formerly president of the Appalachian Mountain Club, and Jaffrey farmer Albert Annett while overlooking the Wapack Range, then known as the Boundary Mountains. The two talked about the possibility of a skyline trail along the ridge of the Boundary Mountains from Mt. Watatic to North Pack Monadnock. Later, Albert brought the idea to fellow farmers Frank Robbins and Marion Buck of Rindge, New Hampshire. The three started cutting the trail near the end of the summer using hand tools. The trail was opened in 1923. Buck named it by joining the Wa from Mt. Watatic and Pack from North Pack Monadnock, and soon the Boundary Mountains became known as the Wapack Range.

== Trail running races ==
There are two running races along the trail. A race in May was started in 2007 by Bogie Dumitrescu. It is 21.5 miles (34.6 km) and goes the whole length of the trail beginning at the northern terminus. A longer 50-mile (80 km) out-and-back ultramarathon version starts at the southern terminus and runs all the way to the northern terminus and back. An out and back segment to Binney Pond is added to bring the distance to 50 miles. Slower runners are stopped after 43 miles (69 km).

On Labor Day in early September, a 18-mile (29 km) race coordinated by Paul Funch covers the southern part of the trail. It starts at the Windblown cross-country ski area and proceeds to Mount Watatic and back.
