= Sharon, New Hampshire =

- Town
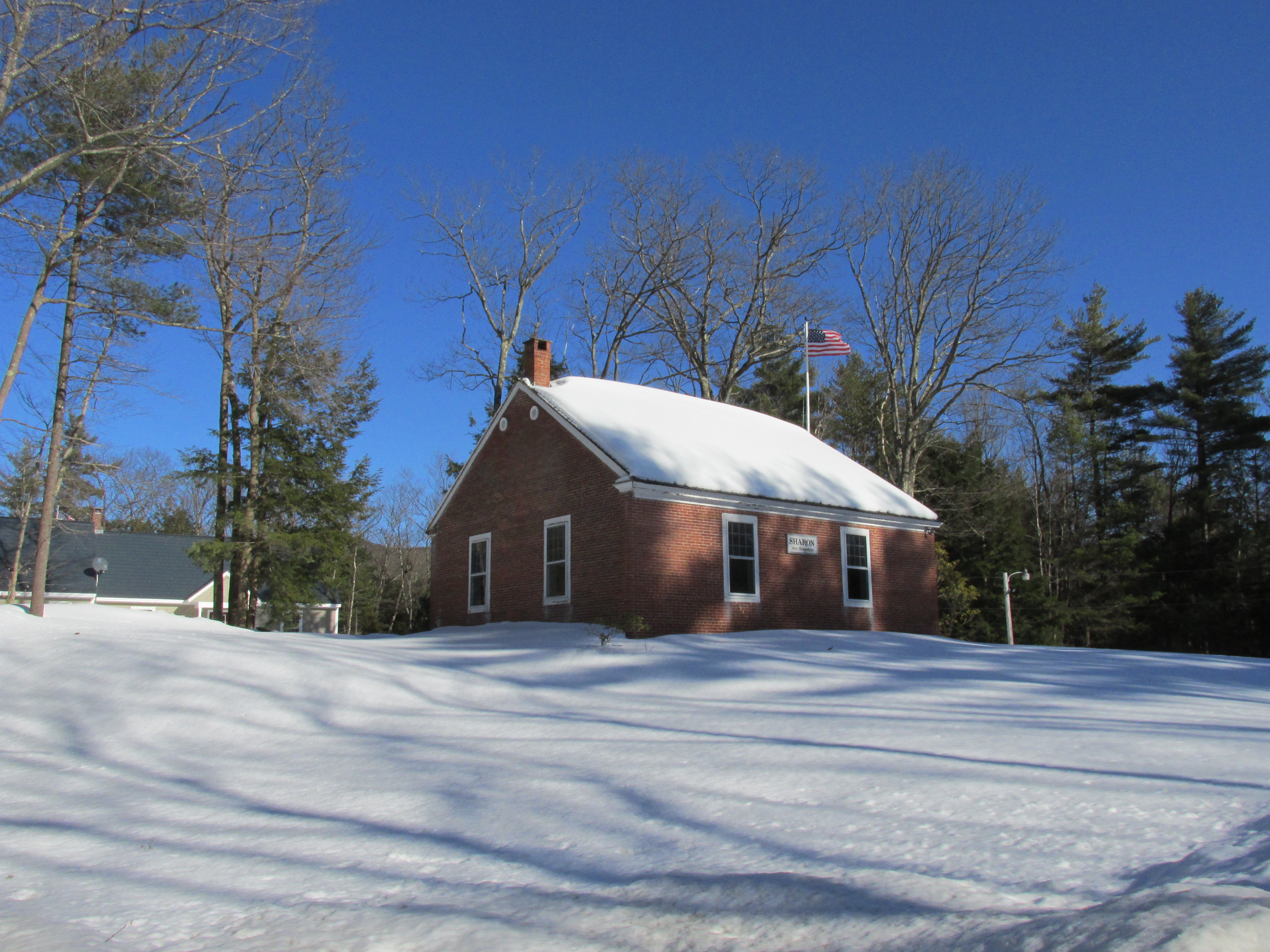
- 1832 one-room brick schoolhouse

- Seal

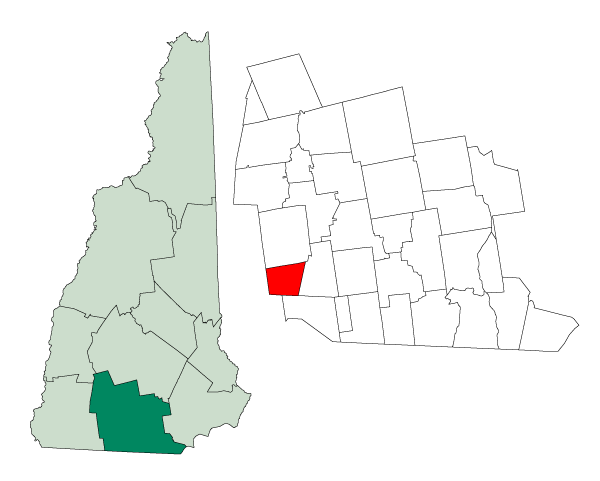
- Location in Hillsborough County, New Hampshire
- Coordinates: 42°48′47″N 71°54′56″W
- Country: United States
- State: New Hampshire
- County: Hillsborough
- Incorporated: 1791

Government
  - Board of Selectmen: Joel Patterson; Richard Dufresne; Jon Shomody
  - Town Administrator: Debra Harling

Area
  - Total: 15.7 sq mi (40.6 km^{2})
  - Land: 15.7 sq mi (40.6 km^{2})
  - Water: 0 sq mi (0.0 km^{2})
- Elevation: 1,179 ft (359 m)

Population (2020)
  - Total: 359
  - Density: 23/sq mi (8.9/km^{2})
- Time zone: UTC−5 (Eastern)
  - Summer (DST): UTC−4 (Eastern)
- ZIP code: 03458
- Area code: 603
- FIPS code: 33-68820
- GNIS feature ID: 0873719
- Website: sharonnh.gov

Sharon is a town in Hillsborough County, New Hampshire, United States. The population was 359 at the 2020 census.

== History ==
Sharon was first settled in 1738 as part of "Peterborough Slip", an area which until 1768 included Temple. In 1777, it petitioned to become part of Peterborough, but was denied. It was called "Sliptown" until 1791, when it was incorporated as Sharon. It took its name from Sharon, Connecticut, from which many settlers originated.

The topography is uneven and, in parts, mountainous. In 1823, the population was 400. By 1859, when the population was 229, the town had three sawmills. The principal occupation, however, was farming.

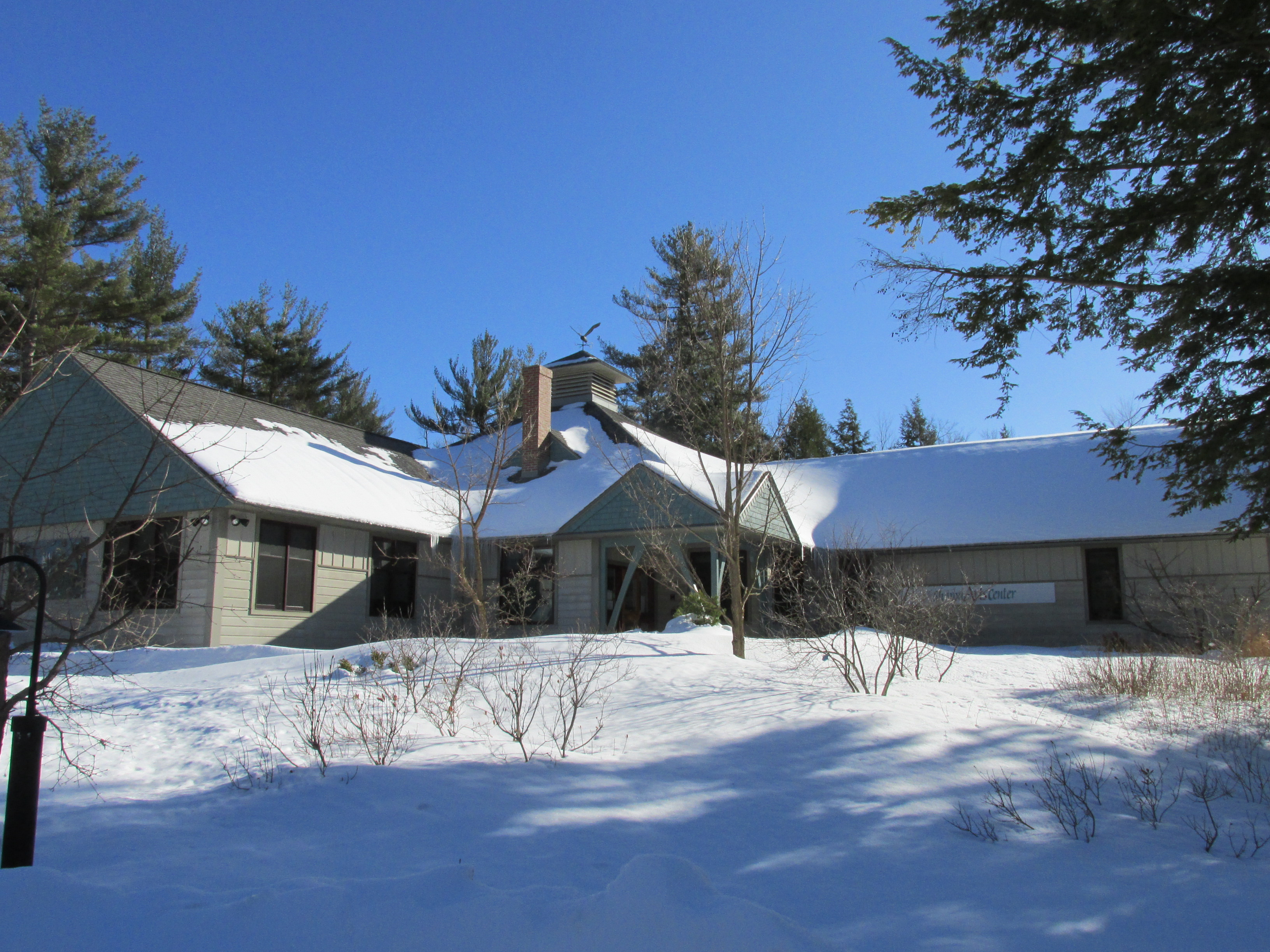
(Closed) Sharon Arts Center

== Geography ==
According to the United States Census Bureau, the town has a total area of 15.7 square miles (40.6 km^{2}), all of it recorded as land. The town is drained by several branches of the Contoocook River, which rise near the southeastern corner of the town. Temple Mountain forms the eastern boundary of Sharon for several miles. Holt Peak on Temple Mountain, at 2,045 feet (623 m) above sea level, is the highest point in Sharon.

=== Adjacent municipalities ===
- Peterborough (north)
- Temple (east)
- New Ipswich (southeast)
- Rindge (southwest)
- Jaffrey (west)

== Demographics ==
Historical population
Census	Pop.	Note	%±
1790	259		—
1800	428		65.3%
1810	446		4.2%
1820	391		−12.3%
1830	271		−30.7%
1840	251		−7.4%
1850	226		−10.0%
1860	250		10.6%
1870	182		−27.2%
1880	203		11.5%
1890	137		−32.5%
1900	122		−10.9%
1910	71		−41.8%
1920	21		−70.4%
1930	38		81.0%
1940	61		60.5%
1950	62		1.6%
1960	78		25.8%
1970	136		74.4%
1980	184		35.3%
1990	299		62.5%
2000	360		20.4%
2010	352		−2.2%
2020	359		2.0%
2024 (est.)	353		−1.7%
U.S. Decennial Census

As of the census of 2000, there were 360 people, 138 households, and 113 families residing in the town. The population density was 24.7 people per square mile (9.5/km^{2}). There were 159 housing units at an average density of 10.9 per square mile (4.2/km^{2}). The racial makeup of the town was 96.94% White, 0.56% African American, 0.56% Native American, 1.11% Asian, and 0.83% from two or more races. Hispanic or Latino of any race were 0.28% of the population. 24.8% were of English, 17.4% Irish, 6.4% French Canadian, 6.0% Italian, 5.7% Finnish, 5.7% French and 5.4% Polish ancestry according to Census 2000.

There were 138 households, out of which 37.0% had children under the age of 18 living with them, 73.2% were married couples living together, 5.8% had a female householder with no husband present, and 18.1% were non-families. 14.5% of all households were made up of individuals, and 3.6% had someone living alone who was 65 years of age or older. The average household size was 2.61 and the average family size was 2.88.

In the town, the population was spread out, with 24.4% under the age of 18, 5.6% from 18 to 24, 27.5% from 25 to 44, 31.4% from 45 to 64, and 11.1% who were 65 years of age or older. The median age was 41 years. For every 100 females, there were 129.3 males. For every 100 females age 18 and over, there were 117.6 males.

The median income for a household in the town was $66,250, and the median income for a family was $75,325. Males had a median income of $51,071 versus $29,375 for females. The per capita income for the town was $29,478. About 1.8% of families and 3.8% of the population were below the poverty line, including none of those under age 18 and 7.3% of those age 65 or over.

== Culture ==
The town was the long-time home of the Sharon Arts Center, a nonprofit which ceased operations in 2019.

== Notable people ==
- P. J. O'Rourke (1947–2022), political satirist and journalist
- Erazim Kohák (1933–2020), educator, philosopher, writer
- Gustavus Swan (1787–1860), politician, jurist, banker
