= Temple, New Hampshire =

- Town
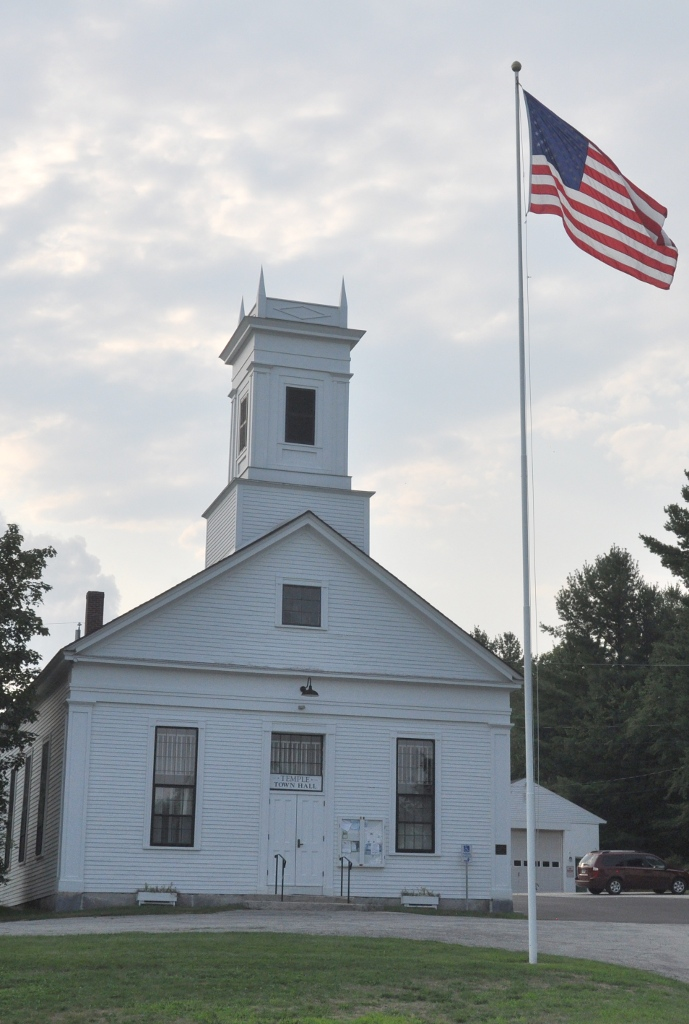
- Town Hall c.1842

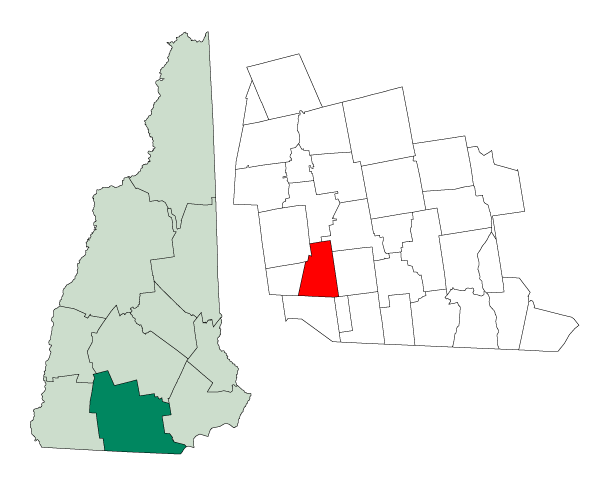
- Location in Hillsborough County, New Hampshire
- Coordinates: 42°49′05″N 71°51′05″W
- Country: United States
- State: New Hampshire
- County: Hillsborough
- Incorporated: 1768
- Named for: John Temple

Government
  - Select Board: Ken Caisse, Chair; Clayton Lennarz; George Willard

Area
  - Total: 22.5 sq mi (58.2 km^{2})
  - Land: 22.2 sq mi (57.6 km^{2})
  - Water: 0.23 sq mi (0.6 km^{2}) 0.98%
- Elevation: 1,024 ft (312 m)

Population (2020)
  - Total: 1,382
  - Density: 62/sq mi (24/km^{2})
- Time zone: UTC-5 (Eastern)
  - Summer (DST): UTC-4 (Eastern)
- ZIP code: 03084
- Area code: 603
- FIPS code: 33-76260
- GNIS feature ID: 0873737
- Website: www.templenh.gov

Temple is a town in Hillsborough County, New Hampshire, United States. Its population was 1,382 at the 2020 census. It is home to Temple Mountain State Reservation, formerly the Temple Mountain Ski Area.

== History ==
The area was first called "Peterborough Slip", which included what is now the town of Sharon. In 1758, Maj. Ephraim Heald and his wife Sarah, along with his brother Deacon Peter Heald and Oliver Heald, a cousin, were among the first settlers. Peter Heald is generally considered to be the founder of Temple, and his child, Peter, was the first male child born in the town. In 1768, it was incorporated by colonial Governor John Wentworth, who named it after his lieutenant governor, John Temple. Peter Felt, from Lynn, Massachusetts, arrived with his wife Lucy Andrews, of Concord, Massachusetts, in 1769. Temple Glassworks was founded in 1780 by Robert Hewes of Boston. Although the company is long defunct, surviving examples of Temple glass are today rare and prized collectibles. By 1859, Temple had a population of 579, with two sawmills, one gristmill, and a tannery. The town of Temple, Maine was named after Temple, NH.

Terrain is generally uneven and rocky. It is also elevated, commanding distant views to the east and south. As John Farmer and Jacob Bailey Moore wrote in 1823, "From the highest point of elevation, twenty meetinghouses may be seen when the atmosphere is clear."

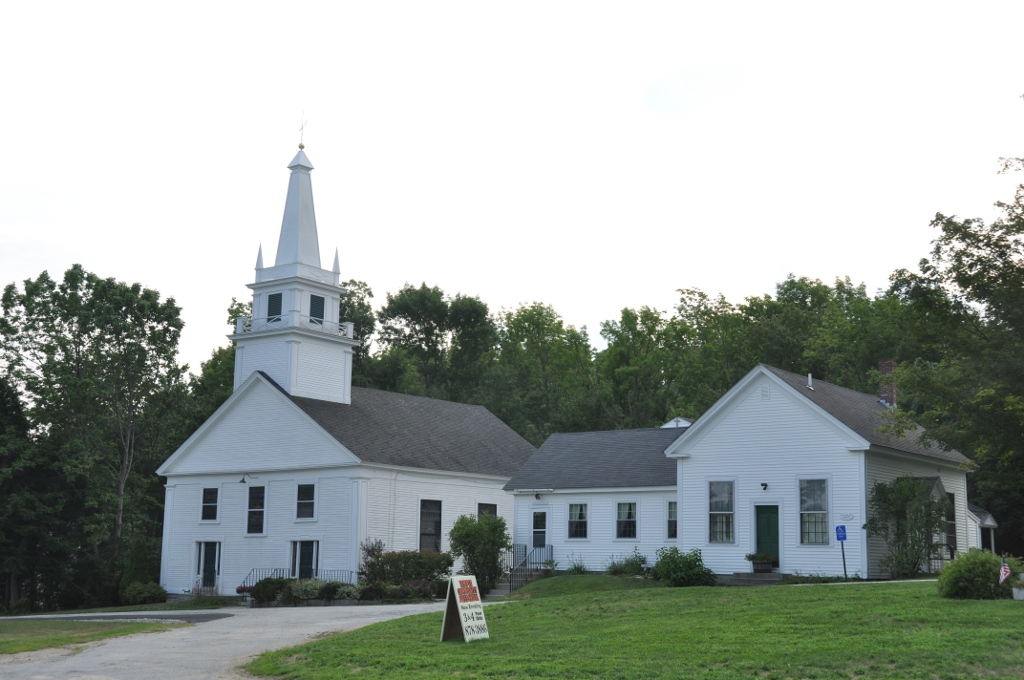
Congregational Church

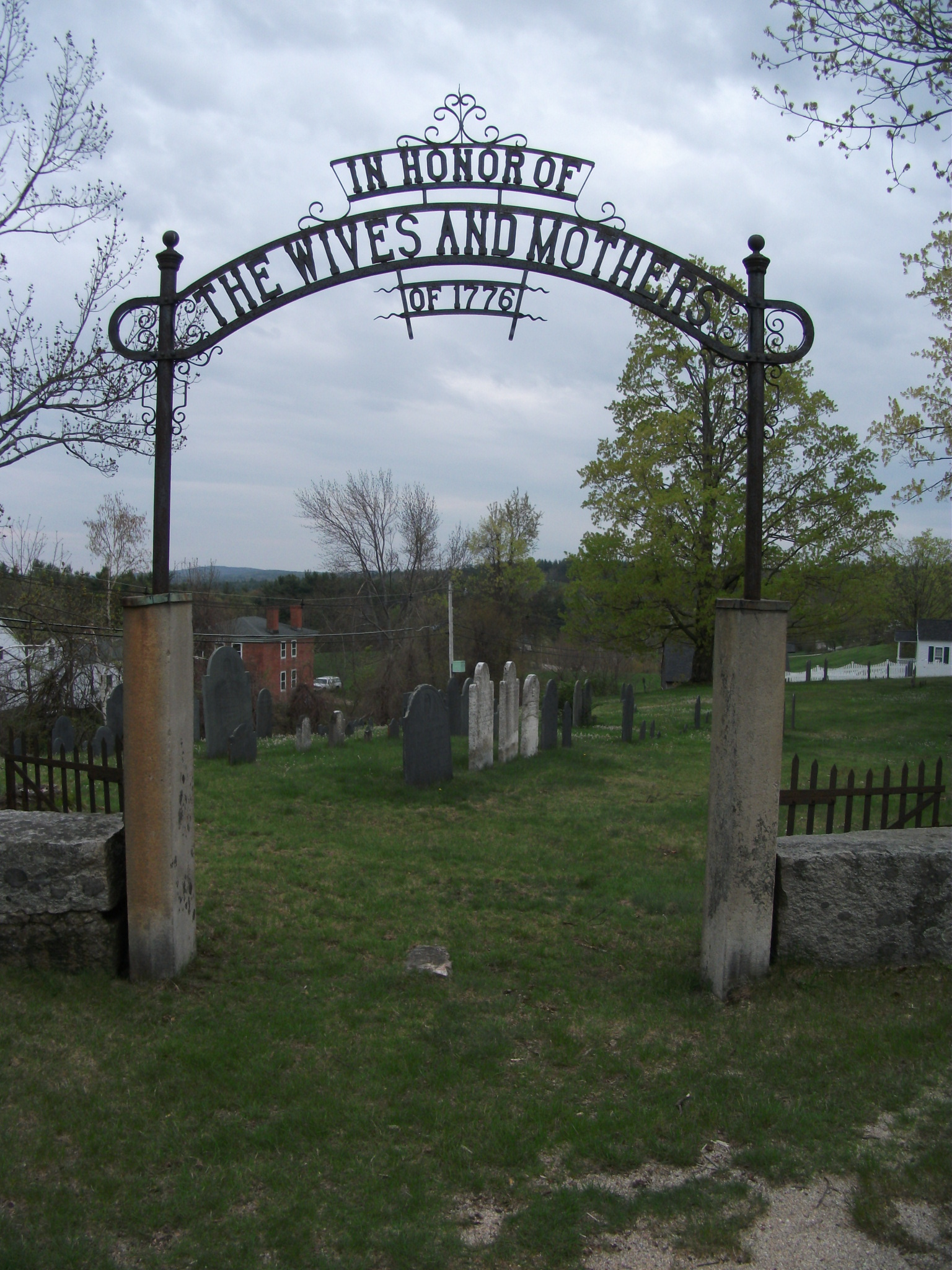
Cemetery gate

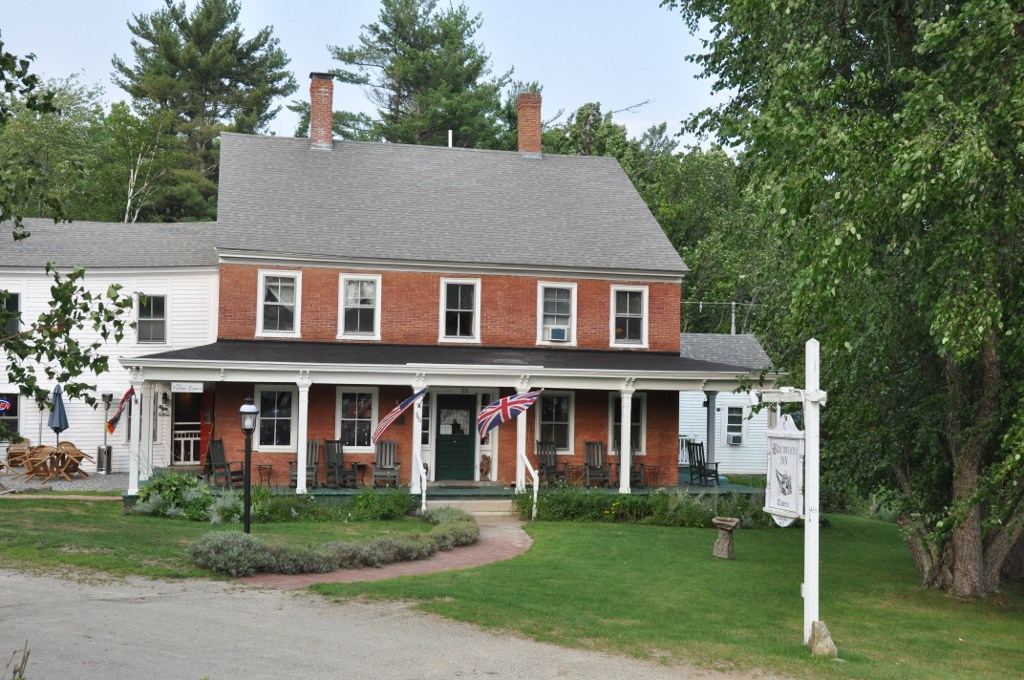
Birchwood Inn

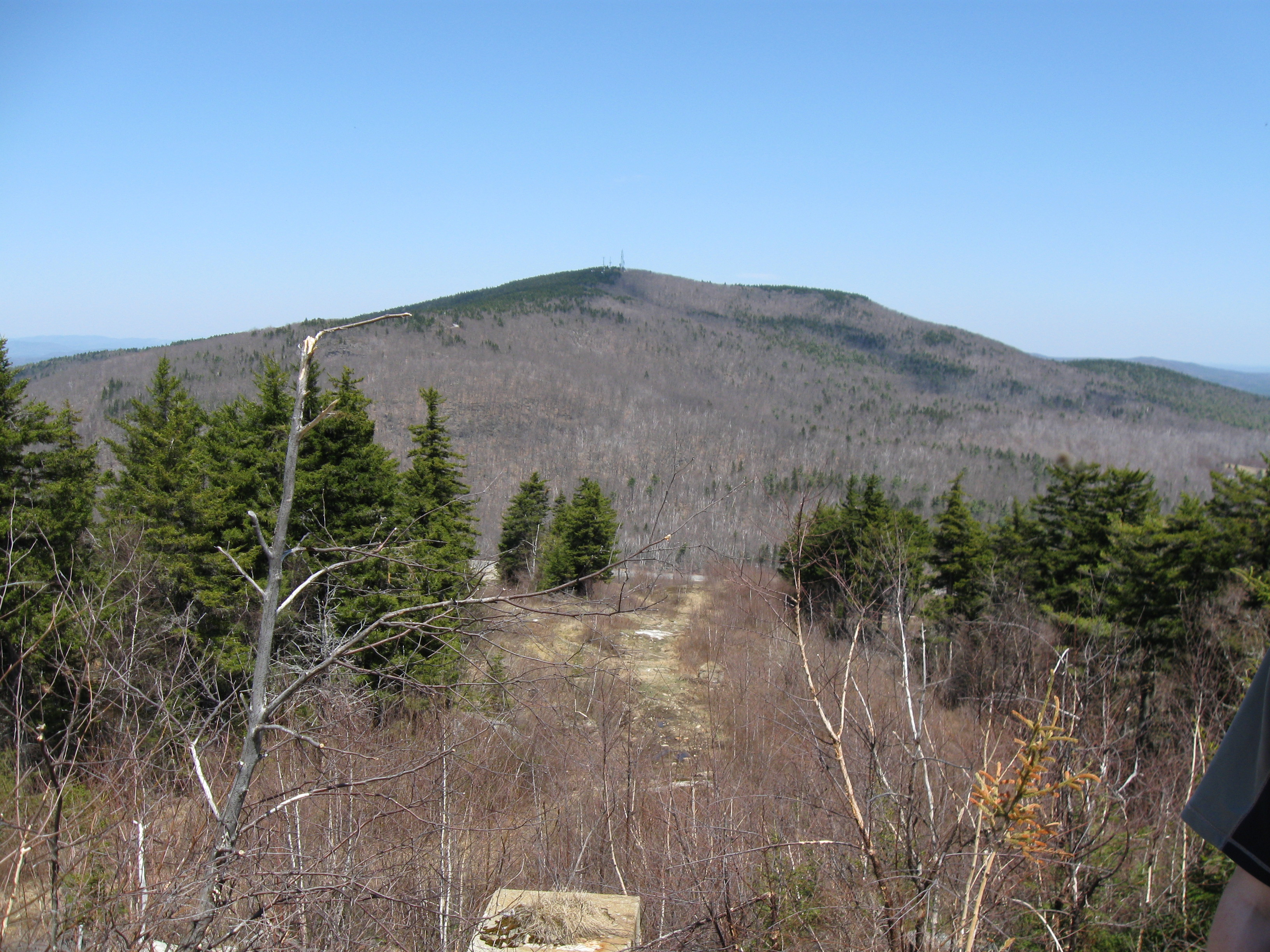
View from Temple Mountain

== Geography ==
According to the United States Census Bureau, the town has a total area of 22.5 square miles (58.2 km^{2}), of which 0.2 sq mi (0.6 km^{2}) is covered by water, comprising 0.98% of the town. The town is drained to the east by Blood Brook and its tributary Temple Brook, part of the Souhegan River watershed. The highest point in Temple is 2,190 feet (670 m) above sea level, on an eastern spur of South Pack Monadnock Mountain. South of Route 101, 2,045-foot (623 m) Temple Mountain forms the town's western boundary for several miles.

=== Adjacent municipalities ===
- Greenfield (north)
- Lyndeborough (northeast)
- Wilton (east)
- Greenville (southeast)
- New Ipswich (south)
- Sharon (west)
- Peterborough (northwest)

== Demographics ==
Historical population
Census	Pop.	Note	%±
1790	747		—
1800	867		16.1%
1810	941		8.5%
1820	752		−20.1%
1830	647		−14.0%
1840	576		−11.0%
1850	579		0.5%
1860	501		−13.5%
1870	421		−16.0%
1880	492		16.9%
1890	342		−30.5%
1900	313		−8.5%
1910	284		−9.3%
1920	263		−7.4%
1930	239		−9.1%
1940	258		7.9%
1950	330		27.9%
1960	361		9.4%
1970	441		22.2%
1980	692		56.9%
1990	1,194		72.5%
2000	1,297		8.6%
2010	1,366		5.3%
2020	1,382		1.2%
2024 (est.)	1,401		1.4%
U.S. Decennial Census

As of the census of 2000, 1,297 people, 440 households, and 347 families resided in the town. The population density was 55.8 inhabitants per square mile (21.5/km^{2}). The 465 housing units had an average density of 20.0 per square mile (7.7/km^{2}). The racial makeup of the town was 98.00% White, 0.31% African American, 0.31% Native American, 0.31% Asian, 0.54% from other races, and 0.54% from two or more races. Hispanics or Latinos of any race were 0.69% of the population.

Of the 440 households, 42.3% had children under 18 living with them, 67.5% were married couples living together, 6.6% had a female householder with no husband present, and 21.1% were not families. About 16.4% of all households were made up of individuals, and 5.2% had someone living alone who was 65 or older. The average household size was 2.91 and the average family size was 3.24.

In the town, the age distribution was 29.8% under 18, 5.8% from 18 to 24, 30.7% from 25 to 44, 25.3% from 45 to 64, and 8.4% who were 65 or older. The median age was 37 years. For every 100 females, there were 102.7 males. For every 100 females 18 and over, there were 106.3 males.

The median income for a household in the town was $56,500, and for a family was $64,297. Males had a median income of $36,563 versus $29,545 for females. The per capita income for the town was $21,897. About 2.8% of families and 6.4% of the population were below the poverty line, including 4.2% of those under age 18 and 4.5% of those age 65 or over.
