= Greenville (CDP), New Hampshire =

Census-designated place in New Hampshire, United States

Greenville, New Hampshire
- Census-designated place
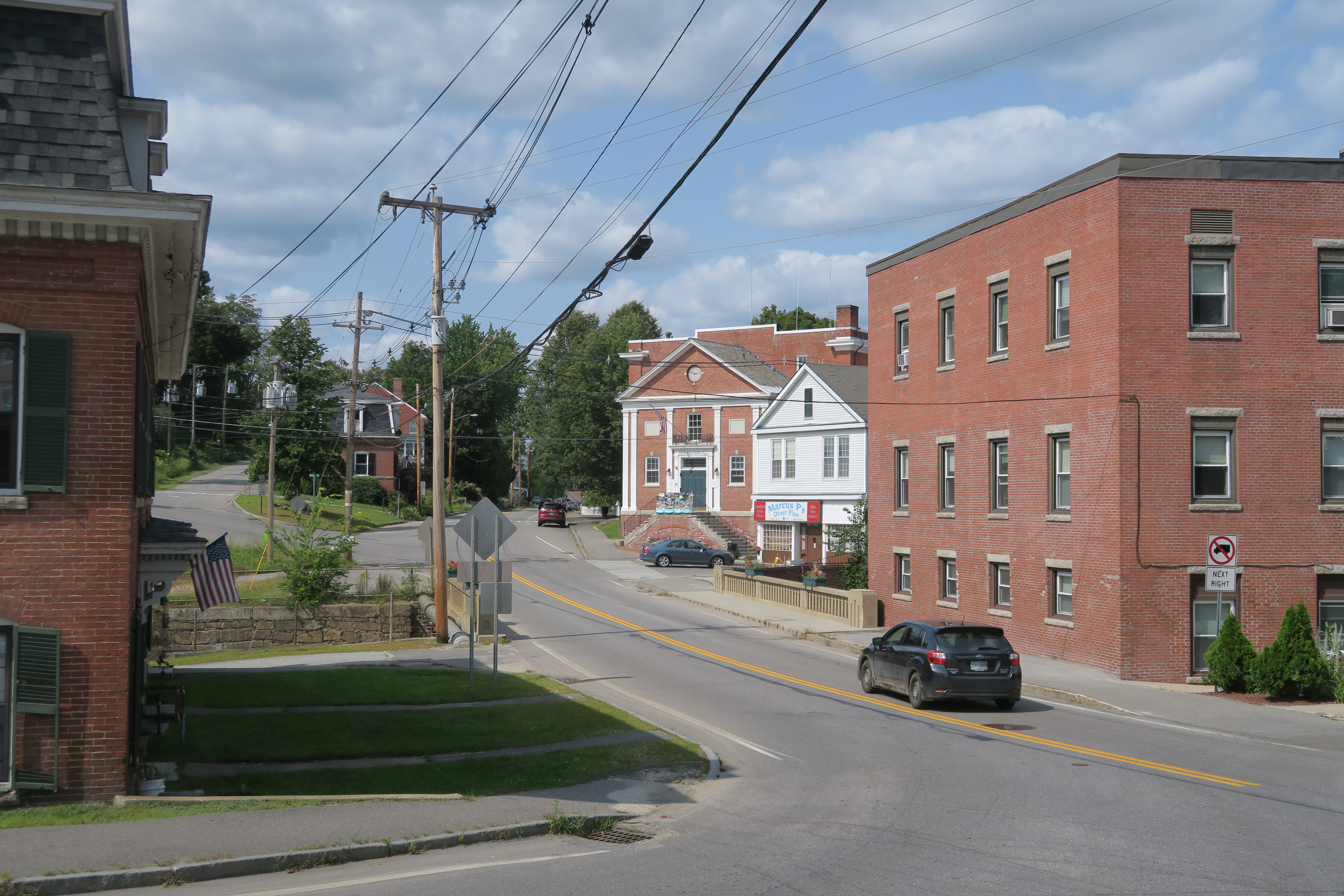
- Main Street

- Location within New Hampshire Location within the United States
- Coordinates: 42°46′2″N 71°48′44″W
- Country: United States
- State: New Hampshire
- County: Hillsborough
- Town: Greenville

Area
  - Total: 3.43 sq mi (8.88 km^{2})
  - Land: 3.43 sq mi (8.88 km^{2})
  - Water: 0 sq mi (0.00 km^{2})
- Elevation: 825 ft (251 m)

Population (2020)
  - Total: 1,074
  - Density: 313.4/sq mi (121.01/km^{2})
- Time zone: UTC-5 (Eastern (EST))
  - Summer (DST): UTC-4 (EDT)
- ZIP code: 03048
- Area code: 603
- FIPS code: 33-31860
- GNIS feature ID: 2378066

Greenville is a census-designated place (CDP) and the main village in the town of Greenville, New Hampshire, United States. The population of the CDP was 1,074 at the 2020 census, out of 1,974 in the entire town.

== Geography ==
The CDP occupies the northern half of the town of Greenville. The village of Greenville is in the western part of the CDP, on both sides of the Souhegan River. The CDP boundary follows the Greenville town line to the north, east, and west. To the south, the CDP border follows New Hampshire Route 123 (River Street, Pleasant Street, and Mason Road) and Darling Hill Road. The portion of the town of Greenville south of these roads is outside the CDP.

New Hampshire Route 31 is the main road through the CDP, passing east of the village center. Route 31 leads northeast 8 miles (13 km) to Wilton and south 13 miles (21 km) to Fitchburg, Massachusetts. Route 123 leads west 4 miles (6 km) to New Ipswich and southeast through Mason 6 miles (10 km) to the Massachusetts border. Route 45 leads northwest from the village center through Temple 6 miles (10 km) to New Hampshire Route 101 at a point 5 miles (8 km) east of Peterborough.

According to the U.S. Census Bureau, the Greenville CDP has a total area of 3.4 square miles (8.9 km^{2}), all land.

== Demographics ==
Historical population
Census	Pop.	Note	%±
1950	1,179		—
1960	1,251		6.1%
1970	1,332		6.5%
1980	1,447		8.6%
1990	1,135		−21.6%
2000	1,131		−0.4%
2010	1,108		−2.0%
2020	1,074		−3.1%
U.S. Decennial Census

As of the census of 2010, there were 1,108 people, 457 households, and 259 families residing in the CDP. There were 500 housing units, of which 43, or 8.6%, were vacant. The racial makeup of the CDP was 97.1% white, 1.0% African American, 0.5% Native American, 0.2% Asian, 0.0% Pacific Islander, 0.4% some other race, and 0.8% from two or more races. 2.4% of the population were Hispanic or Latino of any race.

Of the 457 households in the CDP, 29.8% had children under the age of 18 living with them, 38.5% were headed by married couples living together, 12.5% had a female householder with no husband present, and 43.3% were non-families. 34.8% of all households were made up of individuals, and 14.2% were someone living alone who was 65 years of age or older. The average household size was 2.42, and the average family size was 3.16.

23.6% of residents in the CDP were under the age of 18, 8.1% were from age 18 to 24, 24.7% were from 25 to 44, 30.9% were from 45 to 64, and 12.7% were 65 years of age or older. The median age was 40.1 years. For every 100 females, there were 95.1 males. For every 100 females age 18 and over, there were 95.2 males.

For the period 2011–15, the estimated median annual income for a household was $52,292, and the median income for a family was $64,236. Male full-time workers had a median income of $47,644 versus $31,875 for females. The per capita income for the CDP was $23,252. 18.8% of the population and 14.7% of families were below the poverty line, along with 31.4% of people under the age of 18 and 26.4% of people 65 or older.
