= Mungo Mackay =

Scottish seafarer (1740–1811)

Mungo Mackay (April 1, 1740 – March 29, 1811) was a Scottish seafarer from the Orkney Islands who made a fortune in the Boston shipping trades in Massachusetts. Mungo was a highly regarded ship master, successful privateer owner and bonder, and operated a store on Long Wharf in Boston. He was also active in the politics of the town of Boston and the Masonic Order in Boston. His legacy includes the Alpheus Babcock and Jonas Chickering piano manufacturing establishments.

== Early achievements in Boston ==
Mungo Mackay was born in Holm Paplay parish, near Kirkwall, Orkney Islands, in 1740 to Alexander Mackay, who was married to Elizabeth Keith. Mungo made his way to Boston in about 1755, as a cabin boy, according to family tradition. By about 1760 he was deeply involved in shipping, and became a Master by 1764. He married Ruth Coney in 1763, and their first child, Mungo, Jr. was born in 1765. Ruth was a grandniece of John Coney. The silversmiths Paul Revere I and II made a pair of silver sauce boats for the couple.

Mungo's brother Alexander, born in Holm Paplay parish near Kirkwall in 1747, also came to Boston. Alexander married Ruth Decoster in 1771, and their first child, Alexander Jr., was born in 1772. Both men engaged in business affairs in addition to the maritime trades. Mungo had an imported goods store and counting house on Long Wharf, while Alexander had a beverage store near Faneuil Hall. Mungo owned a distillery and provided rum for the stores. Mungo lived near the Old West Church where he and his family attended and owned pews. The church still stands less than a block from the former location of Mungo's mansion house. Mungo and Ruth Mackay's son-in-law Samuel Wells Hunt also worshiped there with his family.

Mungo was admitted to the Boston Marine Society on April 3, 1764. In 1765 the Brigantine Polley with Captain Mungo Mackay arrived from Newcastle, England, and in 1766 the same ship and Master arrived in Boston from Teneriff, Canary Islands.

Mungo witnessed the beating of James Otis, Jr. by James Robinson inside the British Coffee-House in Boston on September 5, 1769. Mungo was called to testify as to what he saw and heard. Mungo stated in his own words the following description:

I Mungo Mackey, of lawful age testify and say That on the evening of Tuesday 5 September instant, between seven and eight o'clock, being in the street near the front door of the coffeehouse in Boston, hearing an unusual noise in the coffee-room, I went in and saw a crowd of people, in the middle of which I perceived a man hustled back by the crowd towards the door in the entry, but soon saw the same man advance towards the middle of the room, with his arms up, as though he was striking as some person, which person I then knew not, but afterwards heard his name was Robinson. The person who was hustled by the crowd was bare-headed, and I observed a number of sticks at least three, over his head, and the blood running; and as I approached nearer I found it to be James Otis, Esq; I saw two officers of the navy talking together, one of whom said "You have come too late to see your friend Otis have a good drubbing" to which he replied "I am very glad of it, he deserved it" I saw William Burnet Brown in the room with a whip In his hand, who came up to Capt. Bradford who was looking for Mr. Otis's hat and wig, and asked him in a scornful manner what he looked at him for, it appeared to me that he had a desire to pick a quarrel with Capt. Bradford. I further declare that after the confusion was over, I looked around and observed that company in the room were almost all of them officers of the army and navy. Mungo Mackey

Aside from the proof of the affair by his testimony, Mungo's words help to define the 29 year old's personality.

Mungo became a member of St. John's Grand Lodge of the Masonic Order of Freemasons in 1768. On November 23, 1768, he attended the installation of John Rowe as Grand Master. The Marine Society and the Grand Lodge were composed of most of the notable men of Boston at that time. With these memberships Mungo Mackay validated his place in the culture of the town.

== Revolutionary War activities ==
In November 1775 Massachusetts enacted a law which authorized the issuance of commissions for privateers and provided for the establishment of prize courts.

This was the opportunity for Mungo to both support and profit from the war for independence. On September 24, 1776, naval authorities at Boston received a petition for William Brown to become commander of the Massachusetts privateer ship Boston. The proprietors were Paul Dudley Sargent, James Swan, Thomas Adams and Mungo Mackay. The vessel was a frigate of 300 tons, 22 guns and 210 men. It was one of the largest privateers to be commissioned.

Also in November 1776 Mungo's brother Alexander was commissioned a 2nd Lieutenant of the privateer American Tartar. Mungo Mackay was a bonder of this ship which carried 24 guns and 150 men.

In March 1777 Mungo Mackay appeared in prize court on behalf of William Brown, commander of the Boston. Boston had captured the brig Independence and brought it into Boston. This was his first profitable privateer voyage. There were more in 1777, including the ships Revenge, Sturdy Beggar, and Lizard, and in 1778 the Lizard, Hancock, Revenge, and Little Weasel. In 1779 Mungo and his partners outfitted Adventure, Harlequin, Mifflin, Jason, Tartar, Hazard, Revenge, George, General Washington and Sally.

One of Mungo Mackay's business practices was to hire prominent Masters for his privateers. He employed David Porter (father of the commodore of the same name), Joseph Olney, Samuel Dunn, Jr., Samuel Avery, John Grimes, and John Manley, among others.

In 1780 Mungo outfitted and sent out more privateers, including Chance, Hope, and General Mifflin. In 1781 he sent Flora, Aurora, Prospect, Ranger and Peacock to sea. The prize court records are replete with mention of Mungo appearing to claim prize money for himself as owner, on behalf of his partners, or as a bonder and debt holder. This activity was extremely profitable.

In addition, his brother Alexander Mackay received a portion of the profits of captured cargo and vessels as he was a member of the crew of some of Mungo's ships. Alexander bought a house and land on Federal Street in May 1780. In 1786 Alexander ran an advertisement in the Boston papers for his Wine-Cellar and Store at Town Dock where he offered a general assortment of wines in their original purity, both wholesale and retail also Jamica Spirits, Brandy, West-India and New England Rum and all kinds of Groceries, cheap for cash.

In 1781 Mungo commissioned five more ships. Even though Cornwallis had surrendered in late 1781, the privateers continued their efforts to capture and bring British cargo ships into port. Not until 1782 when the peace treaty was signed did the voyages come to a stop.

Mungo became the Master of the Boston Marine Society in November 1782 in a meeting at the Bunch-of-Grapes tavern. In 1783 he bought some of John Rowe's property on Long Wharf, and a mansion house, distill house and land on Cambridge Street from the confiscated estate of Richard Lechmere, a Loyalist who went back to England.

== Post-revolution business development ==
With the end of the revolution and the creation of the United States, business development started to take Mungo Mackay's time. He also became more active in Boston town affairs.

In January 1784 Mungo became one of the merchants of Boston who became the original stockholders of the Massachusetts Bank, now known as the First National Bank of Boston. Also in 1784 he was elected a fire ward, an important position as wards assigned fire insurance proceeds to fire companies. He also bought a store on Long Wharf from Isiah Doane and enlarged his presence there. His brother Alexander was approved as a retailer of rum at another shop in Dock Square.

From 1787 to 1792 he was Master of the Boston Marine Society for the second time. In 1790 he was elected Grand Treasurer of St. John's Lodge. In 1790 he provided three hogsheads of New England rum for the second voyage of the ship Columbia Rediviva to the Northwest, part of Commander Robert Gray's effort to explore trade on the Northwest Coast.

Mungo's brother Alexander Mackay provided 39 hogsheads of water. Mungo and Ruth's daughter Ruth had married Samuel Wells Hunt in 1786, and he was the collector of the excise fees at the Port of Boston when the ship sailed. It was family business at work.

Mungo and Alexander participated in the outfitting of the new American Navy that was ready for duty in response to the Quasi-War with France. On September 3, 1798, Mungo received $627.08 for 1050 pounds of gunpowder that he sold to Henry Jackson, Naval Agent for the United States, for outfitting the USS Constitution. In February 1799 Alexander sold a night glass telescope to Captain C.C. Russell for use on the corvette USS Herald.

In April 1789 George Washington was inaugurated as the country's first president. Afterwards Washington made a tour of the 13 states and came to Boston. Mungo Mackay was part of the welcoming committee. Mungo was one of three Grand Lodge Masons to send a letter to fellow Mason George Washington on December 27, 1792, to congratulate him on his election.

In 1792 a company was formed to build a bridge to Cambridgeport over the Charles River. This became the West Boston Bridge, later the site of the Longfellow Bridge that exists today. Some of the original stockholders included Mungo Mackay, Francis Dana, Oliver Wendell, James Sullivan, Henry Jackson, William Wetmore, Harrison Gray Otis, Perez Morton, Samuel Parkman, Charles Bulfinch, Joseph Blake, Henry Prentiss, John Derby, Caleb Davis, John Winthrop and Jon Austin. The bridge was opened in November 1793.

The town of Boston initiated a tax list in 1798 that included all property. At that time Mungo was one of the wealthiest land and building owners in the town with numerous sites having a total value of over $37,000.

Mungo went with members of the Boston Marine Society to Quincy and met with President John Adams in September 1798 regarding French interference in American shipping, known as the Quasi-War. Mungo had a strong interest in protecting his shipping enterprises, as well as protecting his nephew John Mackay, the son of Alexander Mackay, who was Master of the ship Galen making frequent trips to the Caribbean.

The Galen was captured by the French. Claims were filed by the owners, and eventually, in 1906, some 21 heirs of the owners and Master received about $1000 each.

After the Quasi-War ended there was a period of peace at sea, but in 1806 and 1807 the American merchant fleet became a target of the British, primarily HMS Leopard. Mungo Mackay's ship, the Mendon, was captured by HMS Leopard.

Mungo Mackay was a director of the Middlesex Canal Corporation in 1805. This was a waterway from the Merrimack River to the Medford River to facilitate trade.

Mungo Mackay died at his mansion house on Cambridge Street in Boston on March 29, 1811, age 71. He had been a member of the Boston Marine Society for 47 years. Members were particularly instructed to attend the funeral. He is buried in the Granary Burying Ground. His estate was valued at over $100,000. His legacy to his family enabled them to invest in several musical instrument manufacturing businesses in Boston. His nephew John Mackay financed Jonas Chickering, the piano manufacturer.
