= Alpheus Babcock =

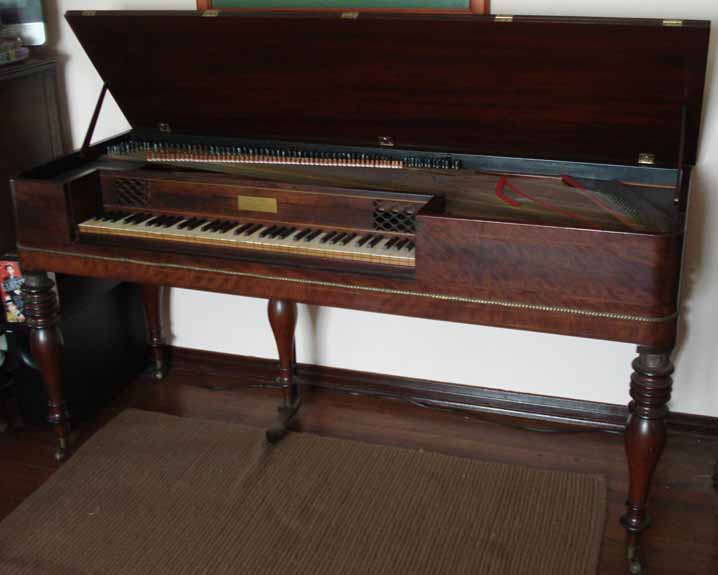
Early Babcock piano with a wooden sound board and iron strings

Alpheus Babcock (September 11, 1785 – April 3, 1842) was a piano and musical instrument maker in Boston, Massachusetts, and Philadelphia, Pennsylvania, during the early 19th century. Babcock is best known for patenting a complete iron frame in a single casting, which better resisted the tension of the strings in square pianos. All modern pianos use this method of a single cast iron frame. He also patented a system of stringing in squares and improvements in piano actions.

== Biography ==
Babcock was born in Dorchester, Massachusetts, and worked for musical instrument maker Benjamin Crehore (d.1828) before 1809. He established a workshop and music warehouse in Boston with brother Lewis at 44½ Newbury Street, but by 1812 they entered a partnership with organ maker Thomas Appleton (1785–1872) with workshops at 6 Milk Street. After Lewis' death in 1814, the surviving partners formed a brief partnership with brothers Charles and Elna Hayt. The business was taken over by Mackay & Co. and added partner William Goodrich (d. 1834), an organ maker and former partner of Crehore. By 1817, it was reorganized as The Franklin Music Warehouse with Joshua Stevens as foreman, continuing at Milk Street under John Rowe Parker through 1823. Babcock may have worked during this period in Philadelphia, but by 1822 worked at the rear of 11 Marlboro Street in Boston and moved the following year to Parkman's Market on Cambridge Street. The Mackays continued an association with Babcock throughout the 1820s, with many of the instruments labelled "for G. D. Mackay" and "for R. Mackay".

Babcock received a silver medal at the 1824 Exhibition of the Franklin Institute in Philadelphia, another in 1825, and in 1827 a silver medal and special mention for a square piano with his patented solid cast-iron frame.

In 1830, he moved to Philadelphia, at the time the largest producer of pianos in the United States, where he patented what he called "cross stringing", and introduced resilient cloth hammer coverings. He was associated with instrument maker and seller John C. Klemm, his former agent, and by late 1832 worked as foreman for piano maker William Swift, at whose warehouse at 142 Chestnut Street, he advertised in The Daily Chronicle in 1833, one could see iron-framed pianos for which he claimed sole manufacturing rights. Babcock won honors at the 1833 Franklin Institute exhibition, along with C. F. L. Albrecht of Philadelphia, and Nunns & Co. of New York.

Babcock returned to Boston in 1837, employed by Chickering & Mackays who had formed a partnership in 1830. Babcock's improvements helped the Chickerings lead the American piano industry through the 1850s.

== Notes ==
1. Ripin and Kuronen indicate "G. D. Mackay" as George Mackay, d. 1824, nephew of John Mackay (Boston Industrialist), and "R. Mackay" as Ruth, (1744–1833) widow of Mungo Mackay, and mother of John Mackay, but Holman writes she died 1820, and that John Mackay was married to her daughter Fanny.
2. For "the best horizontal piano", a square "made for J. Mackay, of Boston" with "the strings of the lower octaves... covered with flattened wire" Spillane, p. 86
3. Not related to over stringing. Babcock's invention involved winding shared wires around the hitch pins.
4. Babcock assigned his 1839 patent to John Mackay, William H. Mackay and Jonas Chickering. John Mackay, like George D. Mackay in 1822, had given Babcock's address in 1825, 1828, and 1829 Boston Directories.
