= John Mackay (industrialist, born 1774) =

John Mackay (1774–1841) was a well known and successful ship master and early industrialist in Boston, Massachusetts. John Mackay was born in Boston and he participated in the Mackay family business of shipping started by his father and uncle. He partnered with and financed Alpheus Babcock and Jonas Chickering in early piano manufacturing by using some of his legacy from his wealthy uncle Mungo Mackay.

== Early life ==
John Mackay was the son of the Scottish immigrant Alexander Mackay (1747–1801) and his Boston born wife Ruth Decoster(1742–1833). John Mackay learned the shipping trades as a young man from his father and his uncle Mungo Mackay. John Mackay became a member of the Boston Marine Society on February 3, 1796. During this early period he sailed ships to foreign ports to obtain cargo for the Boston market. He was aided by the trade contacts his uncle Mungo Mackay had built up, and by some of the sons of Mungo Mackay who were located on islands in the Caribbean as agents. He also had an aunt and several cousins in London.

In November 1798 the Massachusetts Mercury newspaper carried an announcement of the eminent sailing for London of the new ship Galen with John Mackay as Master. John Mackay was described as an "old experienced Master".

John Mackay's father died in 1801, when John was 27. He assumed the responsibility for his father's business and the care of his mother and sister Jennet. There is a scant record of a brother Mungo, but no birth or death record has been found.

== Marriage and children ==
John Mackay married Mungo Mackay's youngest daughter Fanny (1785-1870) in January 1807. They were first cousins. Fanny lived with her mother and father on Cambridge Street in the developing West End of Boston. John lived in his parents' house on Federal Street, and the couple moved to a home on Hancock Street in the West End. John Mackay and his partner Thomas Prince had a store at 66 State Street, near Faneuil Hall.

Their first child was Frances, born in 1807, who died in 1858. Their second child was Caroline, born in 1810, who died in 1888. Their third and final child was William Harvey, born in 1817, and who died in 1850, all in Boston.

With the death of John Mackay's uncle Mungo Mackay in 1811, John Mackay became the executor of his estate, sharing duties with Samuel Parkman and Mungo's widow Ruth. It was a large and complex estate and it took many years to settle all the details. His mother in law, Ruth Coney Mackay, died in 1820, adding to his estate and legacies.

== Mackay Piano Manufacturing ==
During Mungo Mackay and Alexander Mackay's lifetimes a shipping and privateering fortune was accumulated by both families. John Mackay's father Alexander died in December 1801. He left his wife Ruth DeCoster a considerable estate. When Mungo Mackay's widow Ruth Coney died in 1820 at age 77 in the mansion house on Cambridge Street in Boston's West End she left, in addition to her daughter Fanny, a son Samuel who lived in the Barbados, a son Joseph who lived with her and no other direct male descendants other than the members of the family of Samuel Hunt who had married her daughter Ruth and had 12 children.

These two wealthy widows named Ruth Mackay have confused historians to this day as to who was who. Without businessmen in their families other than John Mackay, they relied on him to invest their money, which was comingled in some ventures.

The family apparently invited one young relative to come from London to learn American business. This was George Mackay Dowling (1792–1824), son of Mungo Mackay's sister Nicolap and her husband George Dowling. George Mackay Dowling is listed as a Member of the Boston Sea Fencibles in the August 1814 Signal Roll. To be a member he had to be over the age of 21, and served as first mate or supercargo on a foreign voyage. As an accommodation to his family in America he modified his name to George Dowling Mackay or G. D. Mackay. He lived with Ruth Coney Mackay on Cambridge Street near Parkman's Market.

In 1815, the firm known as "Boston Musical Instrument Manufactory" was opened at 6 Milk Street by the Hayt brothers, Babcock and Appleton.

In October 1815 merchant John Mackay and his partner Thomas J. Prince took in William M. Goodrich, formerly of the Boston Musical Instrument firm, as a third partner, and they started manufacturing church organs. Over the next five years they made at least 12 instruments for South Carolina, North Carolina, Rhode Island and Massachusetts churches including Mr. Young's Church Green on Summer Street in Boston, and one for the Handel and Haydn Society. John Mackay had been an original member of the Society. He loaned the Society the organ, intending to sell it and replace it if necessary. This was his way of advertising the company and its products.

In 1818 Jonas Chickering became a member of the Handel and Haydn Society, the same year they performed Handel's Messiah for the first time in Boston. Members of the Mackay and Hunt families were also members.

By 1820 the Mackay family, including G. D. Mackay, Ruth Mackay, John Mackay, and perhaps others, were manufacturing pianos with Alpheus Babcock. The location was Parkman's Market, in the West End, near Mungo Mackay's mansion house.

Boston newspapers carried an announcement of the loss of Master Mariner G. D. Mackay in the editions of December 16, 1824. At the time of his death he was the Master of the schooner Hayti.

G. D. Mackay's will, which had been written in 1823, and probated in 1825, inventoried many items of interest to piano manufacturing in the United States. John Mackay was the executor of G. D. Mackay's estate. Thomas Dawes, Junior, Alpheus Babcock and Thomas Appleton were the appraisers. Of the several completed instruments in the factory at the time of G. D. Mackay's death several were sold to people in the Boston area including Harrison Gray Otis. Ruth Mackay of Weston, the widow of Alexander Mackay received about $9000 in repayment of loans she had made to the firm. Ruth Mackay died on April 10, 1833, age 90, having lived the latter part of her life in Weston Massachusetts.

John Mackay partnered with Jonas Chickering in a piano manufacturing enterprise in Boston, starting in 1830. In 1837 the firm built a modern factory on Washington Street in Boston.

John Mackay was one of the subscribers to the Boston Athenaeum in 1840. He was also a longtime member of the Massachusetts Charitable Mechanic Association. That organization claimed to have had portraits of John Mackay and his son William in their collection.

== Death and legacy ==
John Mackay died at sea in 1841 while on a voyage to South America, apparently to procure wood for his piano cases that he was manufacturing with Jonas Chickering. His will left his considerable fortune to his daughter Caroline. The relationship of the Mackay family with Jonas Chickering continued, with other members taking some part in the operation of the business until Chickering's death in 1853. From 1841 until 1853 Chickering gradually bought out the remaining members of the Mackay family, although a devastating fire in 1852 cost all partners a large sum of money.

== Bibliography ==
- Dodge, Alfred. Pianos and Their Makers, Volume 1. Covina. 1911.

Crehore who had established a reputation maker of violins cellos and other musical a harpsichord in 1791 and soon thereafter built near Boston In his shop he had John Osborn Lewis Babcock as pupils In 1810 the Babcock to make pianos in Boston The great panic of 1819 business but we hear of Alpheus Babcock again in with John MacKay that commercial genius who so strongly in building up the fame of the Chickering firm. (p. 270)

MacKay had had considerable experience as having traveled to England and other countries and was a commercial genius With sufficient capital at his command and faith in Chickering's excellent pianos MacKay started an aggressive selling campaign making the Chickering piano known in all the cities the United States Chickering freed from all financial and cares devoted his whole time and attention to the development and improvement of his piano and many of his best inventions were perfected during the period of his partnership with which came to an untimely end in 1841 MacKay having gone in a ship of his own to South America to procure fancy for the Chickering factory never returned from that voyage nor was his ship ever heard from again. (p. 271)

- Spillane, Daniel. History of the American Pianoforte. New York. D. Spillane Publisher 1890.

John Mackay of whom I have spoken although reputed to have no practical knowledge of piano or its details took out a patent for a new method of covering and boring the shank holes of hammer heads on August 14, 1828. This was while yet in connection with Babcock. Mackay's patent was reissued in 1839 being evidently regarded of value. John Mackay was originally a ship merchant and bore the title of Captain He acquired some knowledge of and taste for the piano business while trading between and England and Boston in past years, carrying general merchandise after the manner of sea captains referred to in New York chapters and possessed considerable wealth with which he backed up Babcock. His brothers W. H. Mackay and G. D. Mackay were to some degree also in his music trade ventures. (p. 87)

- Palmieri, Robert and Palmieri, Margaret W. Piano, an Encyclopedia. New York. Routledge. 2003.
- Register of the proprietors of the Boston Athenaeum from its foundation to December 31, 1897. Boston. Boston Athenæum. 1898.

John Mackay 1840

- Annals of the Massachusetts Charitable Mechanic Association 1795-1892. Boston. Massachusetts Charitable Mechanic Association. 1892.

We have oil portraits of John Mackay and his son William both members many years since. (p. 587)

- Clinkscale Novak, Martha. Makers of the Piano, 1700–1820. Oxford. Oxford University Press. 1993.
