= Caleb Davis =

American politician

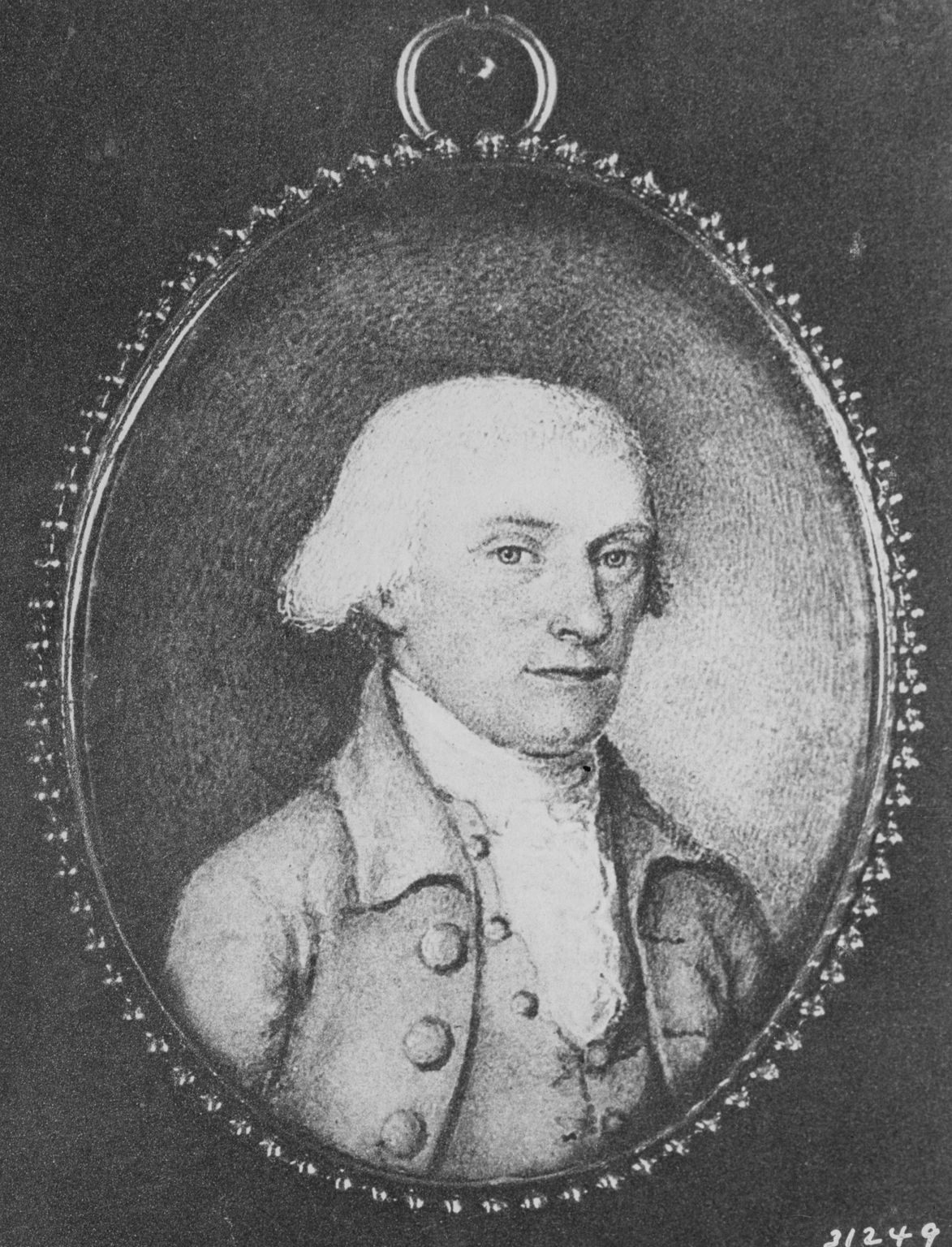

Speaker of the Massachusetts General Court
- In office 1780–1782
- Preceded by: James Warren (as Congress President)
- Succeeded by: Nathaniel Gorham

Personal details
- Died: July 6, 1797
- Spouse: Hannah Ruggles
- Occupation: merchant

Caleb Davis (October 25, 1738 – July 6, 1797) was an American merchant, revolutionary patriot, and public servant in Boston, Massachusetts. He held several positions of public trust, including state legislator (1776–1788), Speaker of the Massachusetts General Court (1780–1782) and Elector for Massachusetts' Suffolk County in the first U.S. presidential election in 1789.

== Biography ==
=== Colonial days ===
Davis was born in 1738 in Woodstock, Connecticut, to Joshua Davis and Sarah Pierpont. Siblings included Amasa Davis, Joshua Davis and Robert Davis. At age 10, Davis and his family moved to Roxbury.

When he came of age, Davis earned his living as a merchant. He kept a shop in Boston. "In 1759 he was a partner with his uncle, Robert Pierpont, in a retail provision and grocery business, soon after setting up a store of his own. ... Considerable purchases of rum from Thomas Amory and others are noted." Around 1760 he married Hannah Ruggles (d. ca.1773). Davis was a deacon of the Hollis Street Church, ca.1769-1797.

=== Revolutionary era ===
Davis participated in the Sons of Liberty. "In 1772-1773, [Davis] was one of the Boston Committee of Correspondence." In 1774, he was appointed to the "Committee of 63 Persons...to carry into Execution in the Town at Boston, the Agreement and Association of the late respectable Continental Congress."

In April 1775, Davis and Paul Revere suspected Benjamin Church of secretly being a loyalist to the British. Revere writes:

I came a Cross Deacon Caleb Davis; —we entred into Conversation about Him [i.e. Benjamin Church]; —He told me, that the morning Church went into Boston, He (Davis) received a Bilet for General Gage —(he then did not know that Church was in Town) —When he got to the General's House, he was told, the General could not be spoke with, that He was in private with a Gentleman; that He waited near half an Hour, —When General Gage and Dr. Church came out of a Room, discoursing together, like persons who had been long acquainted. He appeared to be quite surprised at seeing Deacon Davis there; that he (Church) went where he pleased, while in Boston, only a Major Caine, one of Gage's Aids, went with him.

In 1776, Davis served on the "Boston Committee of Inspection, Correspondence, and Safety. Some months later he was disqualified for further service on this committee by his election to represent Suffolk County in the General Court. He served as Representative from 1776 to 1781, and in October 1780 was elected Speaker. This was the first session after the adoption of the State Constitution. In May 1781 he resigned on account of his many public avocations. In the election of 1779 to 1780 he and John Hancock each received the highest number of votes, 431. ...In 1783 he was again elected to the General Court, both Representative and Senator, but preferred the former seat. He was re-elected annually, and in 1788 resigned. From February 1781 to January 1783 he was State Agent."

=== Early Republic years ===
"During part of and after the Revolution, he was a merchant and ship owner in the coast wise, West India, and European trade. After [1787]... he was active in the management of a sugar refinery." The Boston Directory of 1796 lists Davis as a "sugar refiner". "After the peace of 1783 new trade connections were sought and the operations of Caleb Davis were greatly expanded. In the 1780s and 1790s he traded with Malaga, Lisbon, Cadiz, Amsterdam and Rotterdam, Nantes and Bordeaux, Glasgow, London, Liverpool, Bristol and Newry, and St. Petersburg, ...the West Indies and the Southern States."

In 1783, the widowed Davis married Mary Ann Lewis Bant (d.1787). In 1786, he joined the Ancient and Honorable Artillery Company; his brothers Amasa and Robert joined the same year. On September 3, 1787, the twice-widowed Davis married Eleanor Cheever. Their children included Eliza Cheever Davis.

He cast a "yea" vote in the Convention of Massachusetts that ratified the United States Constitution on February 6, 1788. "He was Presidential Elector for Suffolk in 1789, the first Presidential election. He was Chairman of a committee of three, the other members being William Eustis and Stephen Higginson, to consider and report on the best way to express the respects of the town to President George Washington on his proposed visit; and a member of the Boston Committee of thirteen to arrange for the visit of General Washington." Davis became a director of the First Bank of the United States, Boston branch, in 1793.

In 1792, a company was formed to build a bridge to Cambridgeport over the Charles River. This became the West Boston Bridge, later the site of the Longfellow Bridge that exists today. Some of the original stockholders included Mungo Mackay, Francis Dana, Oliver Wendell, James Sullivan, Henry Jackson, William Wetmore, Harrison Gray Otis, Perez Morton, Samuel Parkman, Charles Bulfinch, Joseph Blake, Henry Prentiss, John Derby, Caleb Davis, John Winthrop and Jon Austin. The bridge was opened in November 1793.

Davis died on July 6, 1797, and is buried in the Central Burying Ground, on the Boston Common.
