= NH 45 =

NH 45 may refer to:

- National Highway 45 (India)
- New Hampshire Route 45, United States
