= Isabella Batchelder James =

American abolitionist (1819–1901)

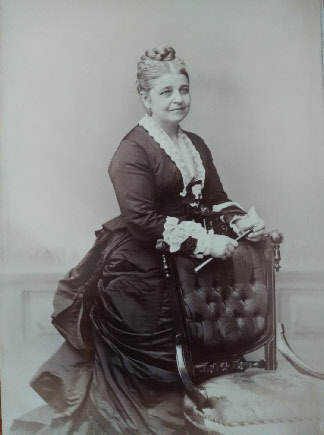
- Born: Isabella Batchelder; 2 September 1819; New Ipswich, New Hampshire, U.S.
- Died: 6 August 1901 (aged 81); Ottery St Mary, Devon, England
- Occupations: Writer, abolitionist
- Organization: Freedmen's Bureau
- Spouse: Thomas Potts James

Isabella Batchelder James (2 September 1819 – 6 August 1901) was a writer, abolitionist, and president of the Pennsylvania Freedmen's Commission.

== Life ==
Isabella Batchelder was born at New Ipswich, New Hampshire, the fifth child of Samuel Batchelder, a cotton manufacturer, and Mary (née Montgomery). She was educated a school run by the Misses Inglis in Boston. During her childhood, the family moved to Lowell, Massachusetts, and later to Saco, Maine. She married botanist Thomas Potts James on 3 December 1851.

On the outbreak of the Civil War she offered her house as a hospital to Massachusetts volunteers and was described as 'unceasing in her labors in the hospitals and in the Sanitary Commission'. At the Great Centennial Fair in Philadelphia in 1864, she was the head of the Department of Relics and Curiosities, which raised money for wounded soldiers. After the war she was head of the Women’s Freedmen’s Commission, which sent teachers to the South, and later of the Episcopal Freedmen’s Commission. In this work, she was tireless, as described by Mary S. Donovan in A Different Call: Women's Ministries in the Episcopal Church, 1850-1920:

she organized local auxiliaries, raised money, recruited teachers, and kept up a steady correspondence with the latter once they were placed. She badgered General Oliver Otis Howard for more assistance from the Freedmen’s Bureau, insisting that the bureau should pay for renting or repairing school buildings and should transport books and supplies to the new schools, and then writing to complain when the supplies did not arrive promptly. She was a relentless fundraiser; even after the Avery estate had given $25,000 to build a normal school in southern Virginia, she pursued the family for additional funds. She recruited both black and white teachers and was even willing to accept a non-Episcopalian “who was an excellent worker” as long as the latter would subscribe to the Episcopal form of worship. Under Mrs. James’s leadership, the Pennsylvania branch was the only organization in the Episcopal Church that provided effective support for freedmen’s programs.

On the death of her mother, in 1869, she returned to Cambridge from Philadelphia to keep house for her father. For the next 17 years, she was active in philanthropic and church work, and was one of the early directors of the Philadelphia School of Design for Women.

James also chaired the Cambridge Ladies’ Centennial Committee that published the historical sketch of Cambridge in 1776, to which she contributed. She also wrote for various magazines, including North American, and Lippincott’s.

Mrs. James was one of the first in this neighborhood to collect antique china. She made a deep study of the manufacture of porcelain and pursued her investigations abroad. She wrote a family history of the Potts family of Pennsylvania that involved much historical research.

== Death and legacy ==
Thomas Potts James died on 22 February 1882. Isabella James went to live in Devon, England, in 1885, with her daughter Frances Batchelder, who had married Lieutenant J. Rose Troup. She died at home, Beaumont House, Ottery St Mary, on 6 August 1901. She was buried on 9 August in Ottery St Mary.

In 1934 James' daughter, Mary Isabella Gozzaldi, presented 'Extracts from the Reminiscences of Isabella Batchelder James' before the Cambridge Historical Society, believing that 'living through the whole Victorian era, her recollections of that period may be of interest'. Also printed were James' recollections of the poet James Russell Lowell, who she had known well.
