= F. Ross Holland Jr. =

American historian (1927–2005)

Francis Ross Holland Jr. (August 24, 1927 – September 16, 2005) was an American historian. He is best known for his books about American lighthouses.

Holland was born in Savannah, Georgia. He graduated from Georgia State University in 1949; in 1958 he received a master's degree in history from the University of Texas at Austin.

He served in the United States Navy during World War II and was recalled to duty in 1950 for the Korean War.

Holland also served for many years with the National Park Service, rising to the rank of park historian at several sites and serving in various administrative positions. He received both the Meritorious Service Award and the Distinguished Service Award from the Department of the Interior. Holland was one of the most important historians of American lighthouses, and spent much of his career championing their preservation.

Holland died of Alzheimer's disease on September 16, 2005, at his home in Mason, New Hampshire.

== Works ==
- America's Lighthouses: Their Illustrated History Since 1716 (1981) ISBN 0-8289-0441-3
- Idealists, Scoundrels, and the Lady (1993)
- Great American Lighthouses (1995) ISBN 0-471-14387-1
- Maryland Lighthouses of the Chesapeake (1997) ISBN 1-878399-70-5
