= New Ipswich Center Village Historic District =

Historic district in New Hampshire, United States

- U.S. National Register of Historic Places
- U.S. Historic district
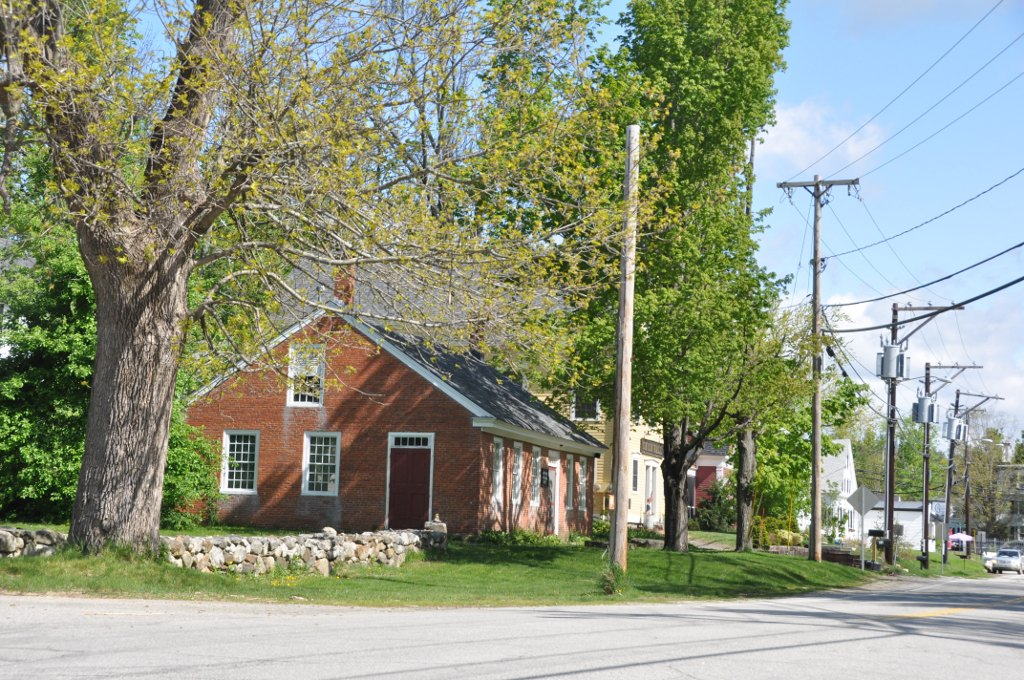

- Location within New Hampshire Location within the United States
- Location: Roughly bounded by Turnpike Rd., Porter Hill Rd., Main St., NH 123A, Preston Hill, Manley and King Rds., New Ipswich, New Hampshire
- Area: 325 acres (132 ha)
- Architectural style: Greek Revival, Georgian, Federal
- NRHP reference No.: 91001173
- Added to NRHP: September 3, 1991

The New Ipswich Center Village Historic District encompasses the historic center of the rural town of New Ipswich, New Hampshire. The center village is the town's most densely populated area, with a history dating to the town's founding in 1735. The district extends along Turnpike Road (New Hampshire Route 124) between King and Porter Roads, and southward in a roughly triangular shape, the southern point of which is at the junction of Main Street (New Hampshire Route 123A) and Willard Road. The village includes a large number of residences, which were mainly agricultural at first, but also include a number of properties built as summer resort houses in the late 19th and early 20th centuries. It also includes most of the town's historic civic buildings, including its historic town hall, and the Barrett House, now a museum property owned by Historic New England. The district was listed on the National Register of Historic Places in 1991.

New Ipswich was settled in the 1730s by settlers from Ipswich, Massachusetts. Their title was uncertain due to land grant claims by the heirs of New Hampshire's original grantee, John Mason, and most of the settlers fled the town during King George's War in the 1740s. New land grants were made after the war ended, and serious settlement began around 1750. The village center area was originally part of two farms, with the town center laid out near the southern end of the historic district, where the first meeting house, cemetery, and parsonage were built in the 1750s and 1760s. A secondary school academy was founded in 1789; its early building, also located near the town center, has been converted into a residence.

== See also ==
- National Register of Historic Places listings in Hillsborough County, New Hampshire
