= Jonas Chickering =

American piano manufacturer

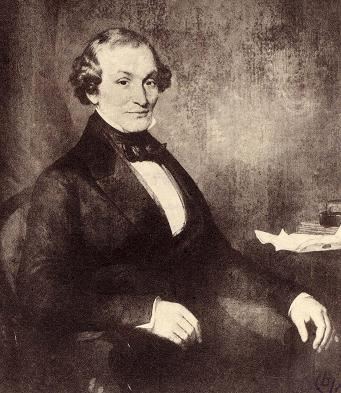
Jonas Chickering

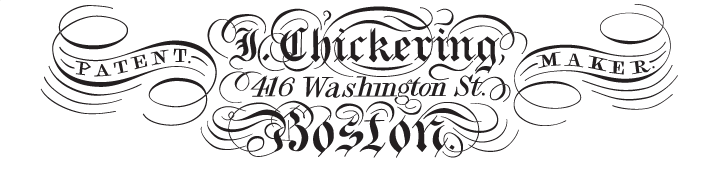

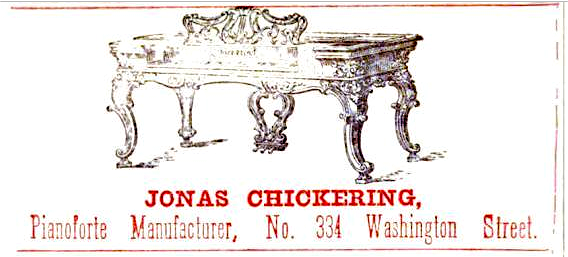
1853 advertisement

Jonas Chickering (April 5, 1798 – December 8, 1854) was a piano manufacturer in Boston, Massachusetts.

Jonas Chickering was born in Mason Village, and raised in nearby New Ipswich, New Hampshire, where his father Abner Chickering kept a farm and worked as a blacksmith. Chickering apprenticed for three years as a cabinetmaker with John Gould. In 1818, Chickering secured Gould's permission to moved to Boston, where he worked for cabinetmaker James Baker for a year, then for pianomaker John Osborn at 12 Orange Street.

In 1823, Chickering formed a partnership with pianomaker James Stewart; they sold their first piano on June 23, 1823, for $275. That first year, they produced 15 pianos at workshops at 20 Common Street. Stewart & Chickering dissolved after four years.

In 1830 Chickering became associated with John Mackay, a merchant and organ- and pianomaker who had worked with Alpheus Babcock. They did business as Chickering & Co. at 416 Washington street. In 1837, Chickering & Mackays (with Mackay's son William H. Mackay) built a five-story factory with warerooms and a small concert hall at 334 Washington Street, and a warehouse at Franklin square.

After John Mackay was lost at sea in February 1841, Chickering mortgaged the factory and bought out the Mackays' shares in installments. The Washington Street factory burned on December 1, 1852, putting out of work more than 200 workmen. The $250,000 loss included tools, patterns, and a nearly completed prototype for a grand piano (later indicated as being overstrung). Chickering organized a temporary factory, and began construction of a new steam-powered factory started at 791 Tremont Street, designed by Edward Payson to Chickering's specifications.

Chickering died before the factory's completion, on December 8, 1853. Over 800 people, including leading piano manufacturers and many of the societies of which Chickering had been a member, marched in his funeral procession and the mayor of Boston ordered the ringing of the city's church bells.

At the time of his death, Chickering's company had built over 12,000 pianos and was producing about 1,500 a year worth $200,000, almost twice the sales of Timothy Gilbert, his largest competitor in Boston. His pianos at the London International Exhibition of 1851 earned a gold medal with special mention for the grand, which was noted for brilliancy and power as well as its great solidity. Chickering patented single piece iron frames combined with wrest plank bridges and damper guides in square pianos, and with massive wrest plank terminations in grands; Chickering & Mackays were assignees of an action patented by Alpheus Babcock, and licensed actions patented by Edwin Brown and George Howe. Chickering pioneered pronounced curved hammer strike lines in squares which permitted larger hammers, and is also credited encouraging Ichabod Washburn to develop the first music wire produced in the United States.

Chickering, with Henry W. Pickering and Edward Frothingborn incorporated a charter to erect the Boston Music Hall, paid for by subscription and built in 1852. He served as president of the Handel and Haydn Society, and of the Massachusetts Charitable Mechanic Association, which he joined in 1829, until his death.

Chickering married Elizabeth Sumner Harraden November 20, 1823. They had four children: Thomas E. Chickering, C. Frank Chickering, George H. Chickering, and Anna Chickering. Chickering's sons worked as pianomakers, and became partners in the company in 1853 forming Chickering and Sons.
