= Greenville Wildlife Park =

Coordinates: 42°44′26.7″N 71°47′58.9″W

- Interactive map of Greenville Wildlife Park
- Date opened: 1998
- Date closed: 2003
- Location: Greenville, New Hampshire
- Owner: Glen Eldridge

The Greenville Wildlife Park was a small zoo that operated in Greenville, New Hampshire for five years, from 1998 - 2003. It closed after the death of its co-founder, Glen Eldridge.

A Sept. 26, 2003, article in The Telegraph newspaper of Nashua described the closure:

"When you come right down to it, it's a dollars issue," said Bob Hayden of Lyndeborough, a member of the board of directors for the region's only zoo.

The nonprofit park will close to the public Nov. 1 after five years in operation.

"We had done OK with gate the first few years, but this year we had a couple of devastating financial things," said Hayden. "We never had the $100,000-a-year endowment that a place like this really needs."

Rainy weather this year cut attendance greatly, said Hayden, but the worst blow was the unexpected death in May of Glen Eldridge, who founded the park with his wife, Kathy. ...

Greenville Wildlife Park was opened by the Eldridges as an outgrowth of when their collection of animals outgrew the Furry Friends Zoo they had established on their Lyndeborough property. They bought a failed condominium project on Blanch Farm Road that had been taken by Greenville for unpaid taxes, and opened the park in September 1998.

In 2002, the park lost a lawsuit over the ownership of two chimpanzees.
