= Henry Richardson (New Hampshire politician) =

American soldier and politician (1917–1981)

Member of the New Hampshire House of Representatives
- In office 1975–1979

Personal details
- Born: April 6, 1917 Johnston, South Carolina
- Died: February 26, 1981 (aged 63) Manchester, New Hampshire
- Party: Republican
- Education: Wilberforce University (BA)
- Occupation: Soldier, politician

Henry B. Richardson (April 6, 1917 – February 26, 1981) was an American soldier and politician who became the first African American to serve in the New Hampshire General Court. Elected to the New Hampshire House of Representatives in 1974, he served two terms from 1975 to 1979.

== Life and career ==
Born in Johnston, South Carolina, on April 6, 1917, Richardson graduated from Wilberforce University with a bachelor's degree in industrial arts in 1943. He served in the United States Army for thirty-one years, serving in World War II, the Korean War, and the Vietnam War and receiving more than twenty-four military honors, including the Legion of Merit, the Bronze Star Medal, the Air Medal, the Meritorious Service Medal, and the Army Commendation Medal. He served as a sergeant major in General Dwight D. Eisenhower's Supreme Allied Command headquarters in Europe after receiving a battlefield commission. Richardson retired from the army at the rank of major. He served on the staff and faculty at the Hampton Institute.

Settling in Greenville, New Hampshire, Richardson served as a member and chair of the town selectmen and president of the local Lions Club and the American Legion post. Winning both the Democratic and Republican party nominations in September 1974, Richardson represented District 5 (Greenville) in the New Hampshire House of Representatives from 1975 to 1979. He chaired the Governor's Advisory Committee for Elderly Affairs and served on the House Education Committee and House Veterans Affairs Committee. He opted not to seek reelection in order to run for a vacancy in the New Hampshire Senate but lost to Arthur Mann.

New Hampshire newspapers characterized Richardson as a political conservative who took office as a Republican aligned with Governor Meldrim Thomson Jr., who unsuccessfully nominated him to serve on the New Hampshire Public Utilities Commission in late 1978.

Richardson died after a brief illness at the Manchester VA Medical Center on February 26, 1981, at the age of 63. He was interred at Arlington National Cemetery. His wife, Katherine I. Richardson, and their three children (G. Renee, Portia and Eric) survived him.
