= Barrett House (New Ipswich, New Hampshire) =

Historic house in New Hampshire, United States

- U.S. Historic district – Contributing property
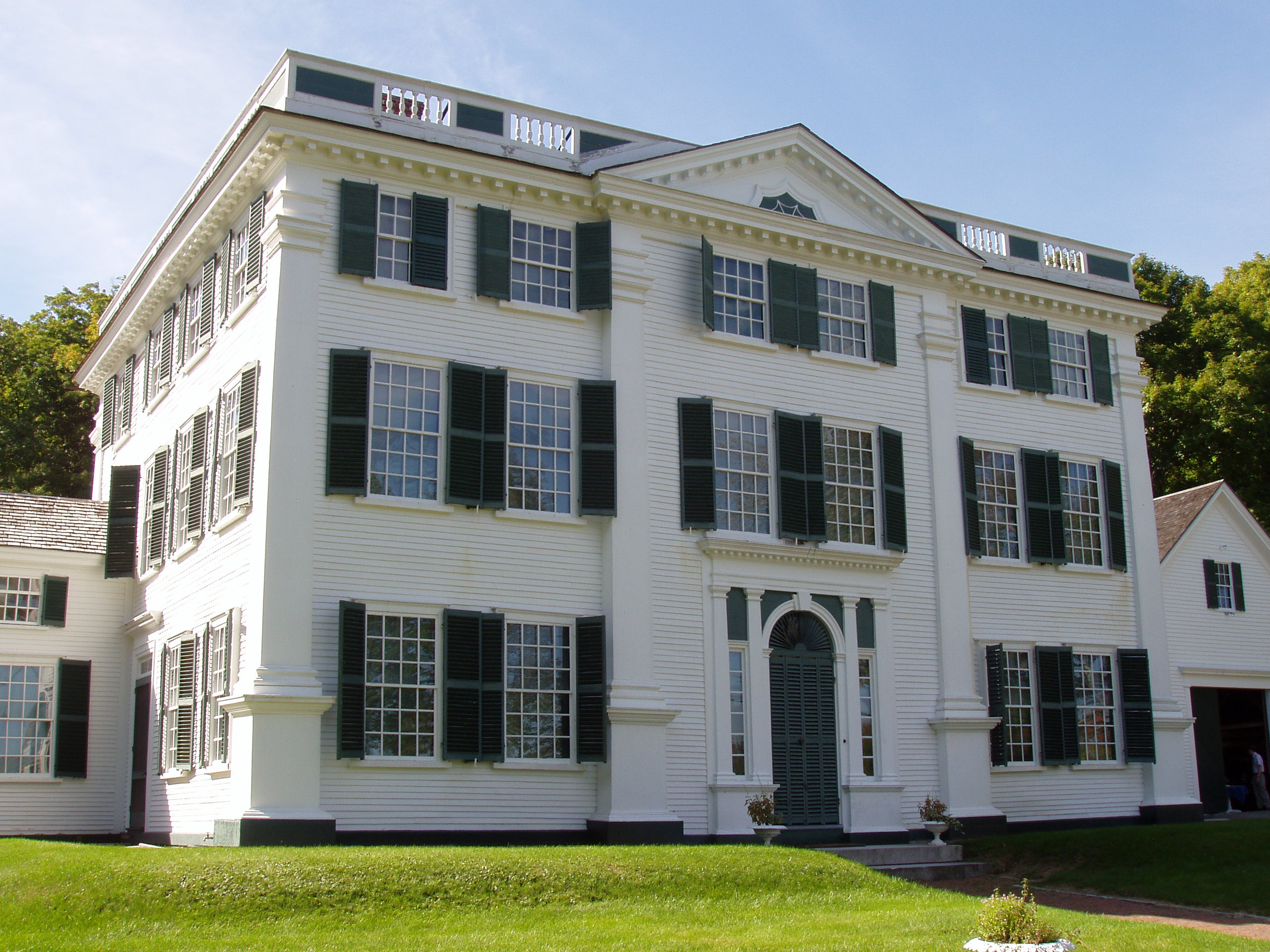
- A front view of Barrett House

- Location within New Hampshire Location within the United States
- Location: New Ipswich, New Hampshire
- Coordinates: 42°45′12″N 71°51′23″W
- Built: c. 1800
- Architectural style: Federal
- Part of: New Ipswich Center Village Historic District (ID91001173)
- Designated CP: September 3, 1991

The Barrett House (circa 1800), also known as Forest Hall, is a Federal style American mansion located in New Ipswich, New Hampshire, part of the New Ipswich Center Village Historic District. It is now a nonprofit museum operated by Historic New England and open to the public several days a year. An admission fee is charged.

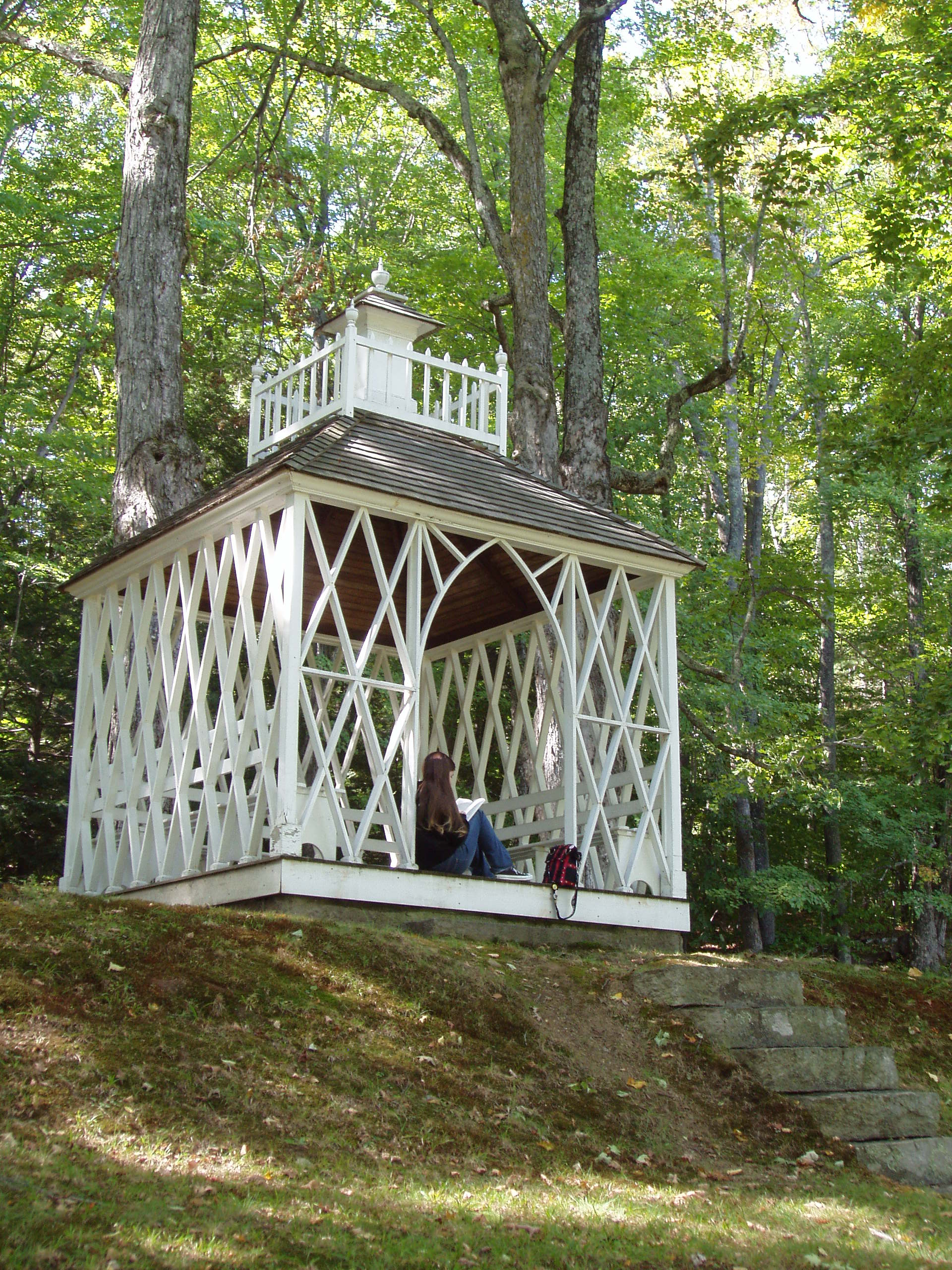
The summerhouse at the top of the allée

== History ==
According to tradition, Forest Hall was built as a wedding gift for Charles Barrett and his bride by his father, a prosperous farmer in town who had invested in a glass factory, a toll road, a canal system, and, most successfully, in New Hampshire's first cotton mill. The interiors are elegantly furnished, and numerous reception rooms were designed for entertaining in a cosmopolitan manner. An elaborate allée was later added to the landscape, with a flight of stone steps flanked by maples rising up the hillside behind the house and leading to an elegant summerhouse.

However, after the railroad bypassed New Ipswich, the town entered into a decline. Charles Barrett's descendants stayed on, but today Forest Hall remains essentially a relic of the Federal era. After 1887, the family used the house only in the summer-time. It was donated to Historic New England in 1948.

Barrett House was one of the filming locations for the 1979 Merchant Ivory Productions film adaptation of the Henry James novel entitled The Europeans.

== See also ==
- New Hampshire Historical Marker No. 137: Barrett House
