= New Ipswich Town Hall =

- U.S. National Register of Historic Places
- U.S. Historic district – Contributing property
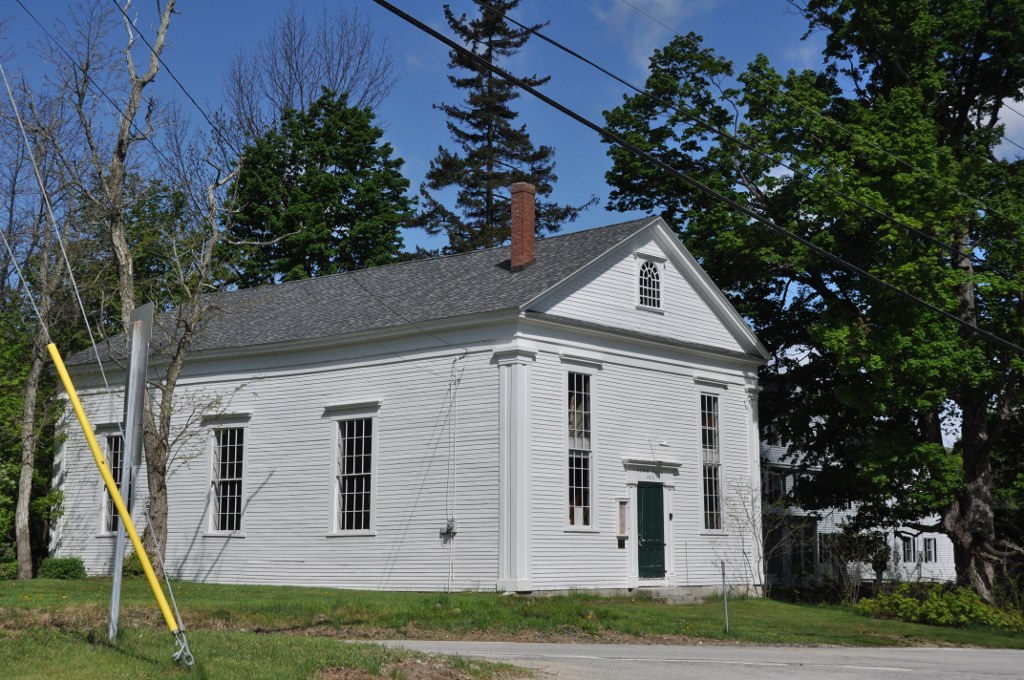

- Location within New Hampshire Location within the United States
- Location: Main St., New Ipswich, New Hampshire
- Coordinates: 42°44′53″N 71°51′17″W
- Area: 0.1 acres (0.040 ha)
- Built: 1817
- Architect: Deacon Nathaniel Gould
- Architectural style: Greek Revival, Federal
- Part of: New Ipswich Center Village Historic District (ID91001173)
- NRHP reference No.: 84000555

Significant dates
- Added to NRHP: December 13, 1984
- Designated CP: September 3, 1991

The New Ipswich Town Hall is a historic academic and civic building on Main Street (New Hampshire Route 123A) in the center village of New Ipswich, New Hampshire. The 1 1/2-story wood-frame structure was built in 1817 to serve the dual purpose of providing a town meeting place, and to provide space for a private academy. The building has been little altered since 1869, when it was substantially reconfigured solely for town use. The building was listed on the National Register of Historic Places in 1984.

== Description and history ==
The New Ipswich Town Hall stands near the southern end of the village center, at the junction of Main and Willard Streets, across from the Congregational church. It is a tall 1 1/2-story wood-frame structure, with a gabled roof and clapboarded exterior. The corners have broad paneled pilasters, which rise to an entablature and pedimented gable. The gable has a round-arch window near its peak. The rest of the facade consists of tall sash windows flanking the main entrance: the windows are topped by projecting cornices, while the entrance is framed by pilasters and a corniced entablature. The interior of the building has a narrow vestibule, which provides access to the main hall, a closet, and stairs rising to a gallery that extends across the eastern side of the hall.

The hall was built in 1817 as a cooperative venture between the town and the local academy, which had been founded in 1787. It was built with two full stories, and a tower with belfry, much in the manner of typical New England churches of the period. The academy eventually moved to another building, and the town made significant alterations in the 1869, enlarging its footprint, removing the tower's cupola, and removing the second floor to provide a single, high-ceilinged auditorium. The exterior also received a number of Greek Revival features at this time, and has seen little alteration since then. The building is still owned by the town, and is used occasionally for civic functions.

== See also ==
- National Register of Historic Places listings in Hillsborough County, New Hampshire
