= Thomas Potts James =

American botanist (1803–1882)

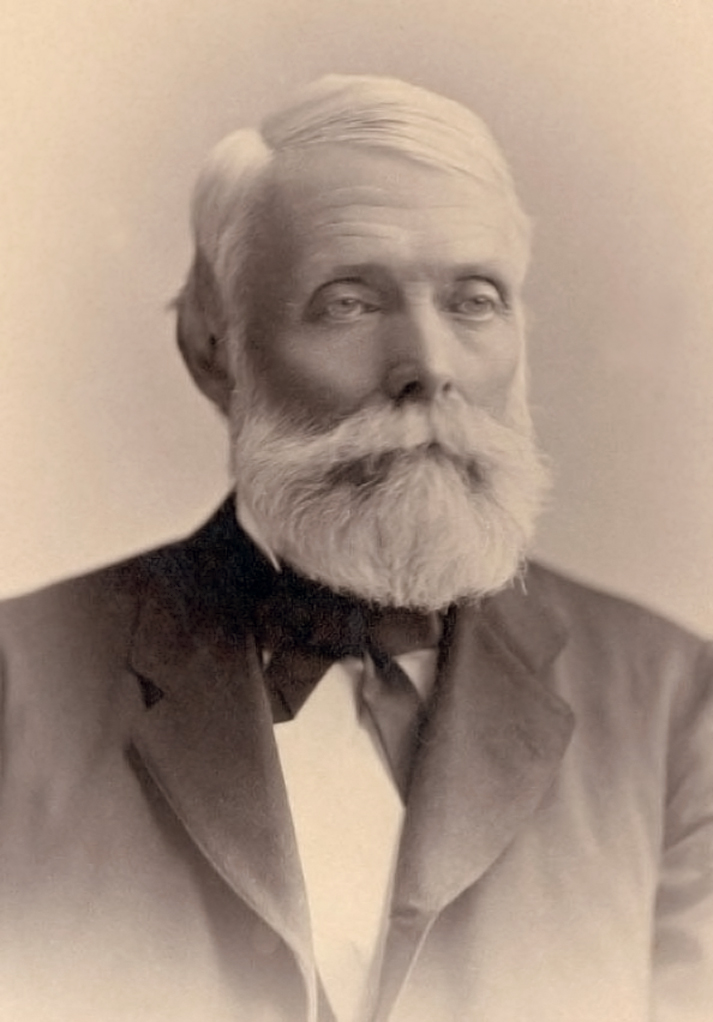

Thomas Potts James (1803–1882) was an American botanist and bryologist. He made important contributions to the study of bryophytes (mosses, liverworts, and hornworts). He wrote the section on mosses and liverworts in William Darlington's Flora Cestrica (1853).

== Family ==
James married Isabella Batchelder on 3 December 1851. Isabella went on to become the president of the Pennsylvania Freedmen's Commission.
