= New Ipswich, New Hampshire =

- Town
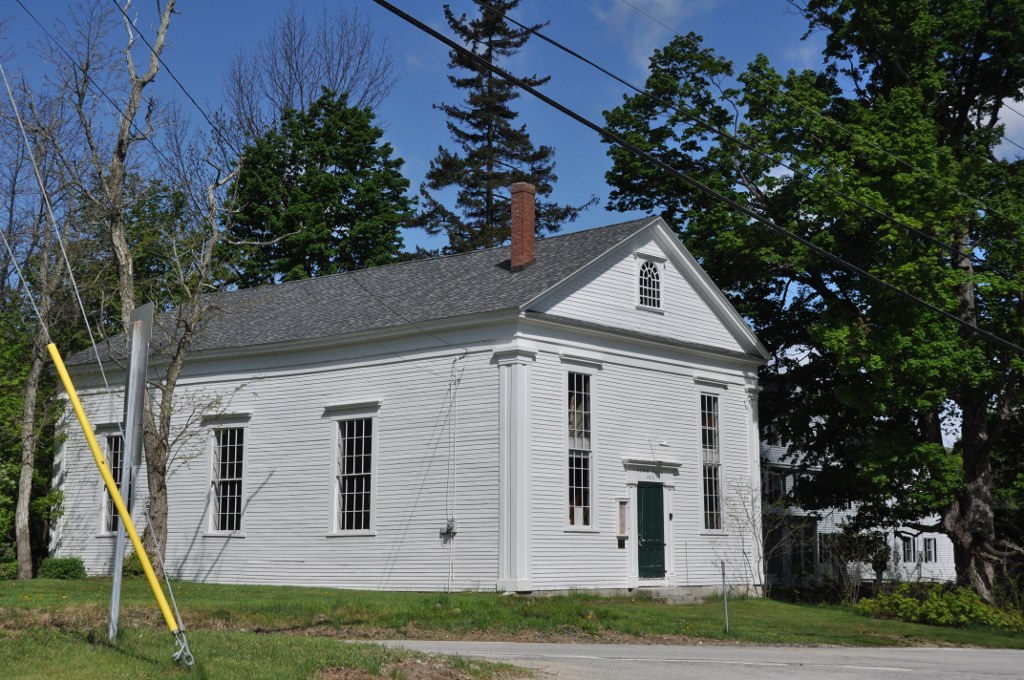
- New Ipswich Town Hall

- Seal

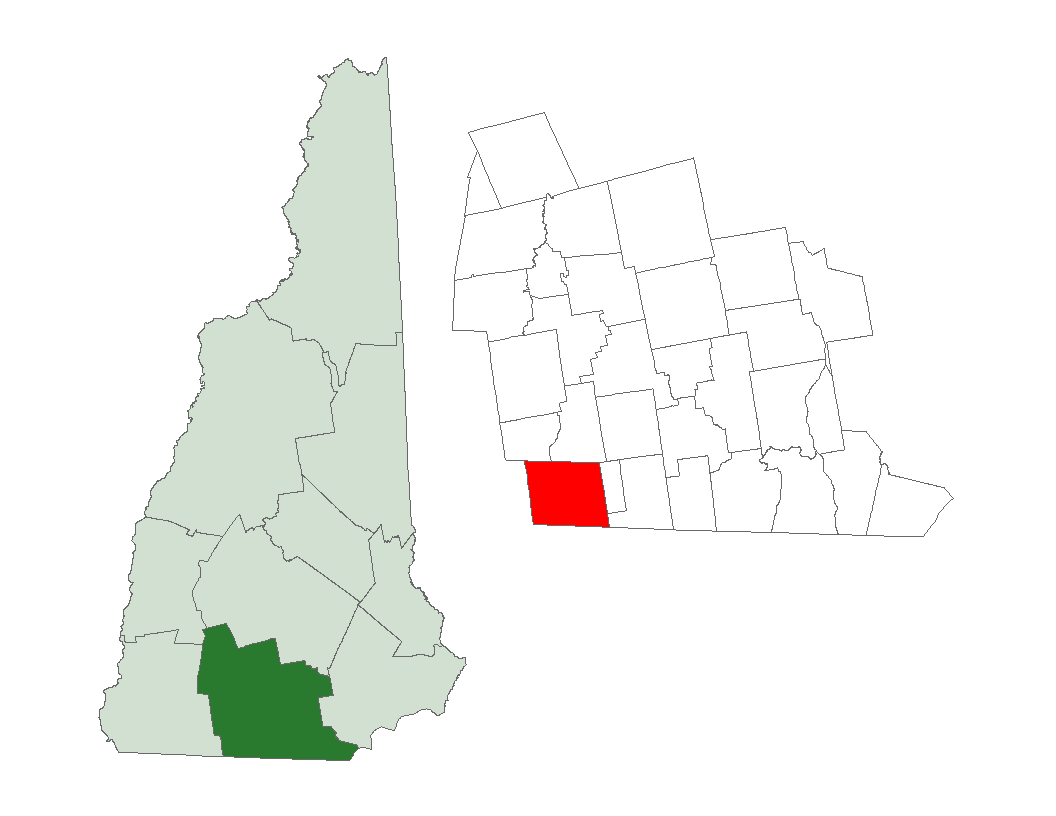
- Location in Hillsborough County, New Hampshire
- Coordinates: 42°44′53″N 71°51′15″W
- Country: United States
- State: New Hampshire
- County: Hillsborough
- Incorporated: 1762
- Villages: New Ipswich; High Bridge; Smithville

Government
  - Board of Selectmen: Jason Somero, Chair; Lou Alvarez; Shawn Talbot
  - Town Administrator: Debbie Deaton

Area
  - Total: 33.1 sq mi (85.6 km^{2})
  - Land: 32.7 sq mi (84.8 km^{2})
  - Water: 0.31 sq mi (0.8 km^{2}) 0.97%
- Elevation: 1,106 ft (337 m)

Population (2020)
  - Total: 5,204
  - Density: 159/sq mi (61.4/km^{2})
- Time zone: UTC-5 (Eastern)
  - Summer (DST): UTC-4 (Eastern)
- ZIP code: 03071
- Area code: 603
- FIPS code: 33-51940
- GNIS feature ID: 0873681
- Website: www.newipswichnh.gov

New Ipswich is a town in Hillsborough County, New Hampshire, United States. The population was 5,204 at the 2020 census. New Ipswich, situated on the Massachusetts border, includes the villages of Bank, Davis, Gibson Four Corners, Highbridge, New Ipswich Center, Smithville, and Wilder, though these village designations no longer hold the importance they did in the past. The Wapack Trail passes through the town.

== History ==
New Ipswich was granted in 1735 to 60 inhabitants of Ipswich, Massachusetts, whence the name is derived, by colonial Governor Jonathan Belcher and the General Court (Assembly) of Massachusetts. Settlement began in 1738, when Abijah Foster arrived with his wife and infant daughter. In 1762, Governor Benning Wentworth incorporated the town as "Ipswich", and then in 1766 as "New Ipswich". New Ipswich Academy, later renamed Appleton Academy after benefactor Samuel Appleton, was chartered in 1789, the second oldest in New Hampshire after Phillips Exeter Academy in Exeter. It would also serve as high school for the nearby communities of Mason and Greenville.

The Souhegan River provided water power for mills, and in 1801, the first woolen mill in the state was established at New Ipswich, followed in 1804 by the first cotton mill. Other early factories produced glass, potash and linseed oil. Cabinet making craftsmen produced elegant furniture. The town's affluence would be expressed in fine architecture, an example of which is the Barrett House, used as a setting for the 1979 Merchant Ivory film The Europeans, based on the novel by Henry James. Bypassed by the railroad, the early mill town was preserved.

In 1836, four families from New Ipswich moved to the Wisconsin Territory to start a mission to the Native Americans, founding the town of Denmark, Iowa.

In 1969, construction of Mascenic Regional High School was completed, rendering high school teaching in Appleton no more, although the building was still used to teach elementary schoolers and middle schoolers. In 1989 Boynton Middle School completed construction, so Appleton was from then to 2012 an elementary school. Appleton Academy closed in 2012, due to the dangerous conditions of occupying it.

In the past half century, a notable influx of peoples of Finnish descent, particularly of the Apostolic Lutheran Church of America, have settled in New Ipswich. Additionally, migrants from neighboring Massachusetts make up a large percentage of new residents.

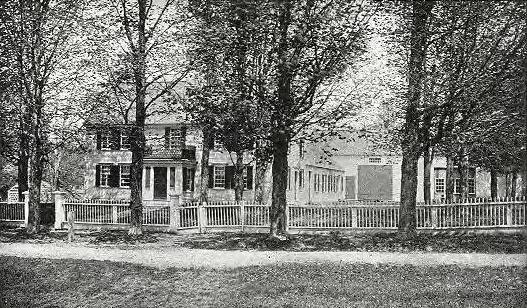
Barr Mansion in 1900

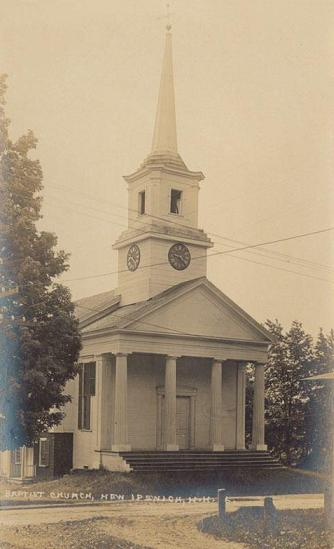
Baptist Church c. 1912

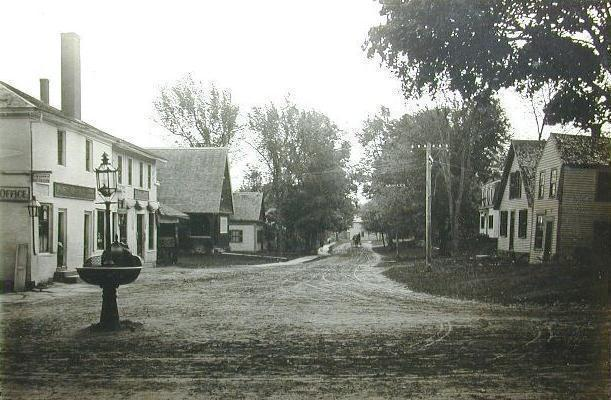
Main Street in 1907

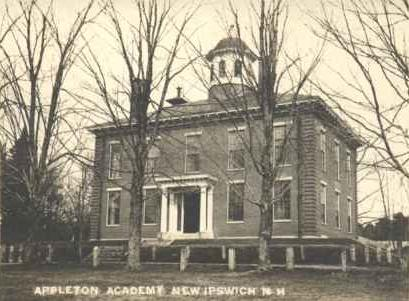
Appleton Academy c. 1910

== Geography ==
According to the United States Census Bureau, the town has a total area of 33.1 square miles (85.6 km^{2}), of which 32.7 square miles (84.8 km^{2}) are land and 0.3 square miles (0.8 km^{2}) are water, comprising 0.97% of the town. The eastern and central parts of New Ipswich are drained by the Souhegan River, a northeastward-flowing tributary of the Merrimack River. New Ipswich Mountain, part of the Wapack Range, is the highest point in the town, with an elevation of 1,881 feet (573 m) above sea level. On the west side of the Wapack Range, the northwestern corner of town is drained by the Gridley River, a northwestward-flowing tributary of the Contoocook River, which continues north to the Merrimack. The southwestern part of town, including Mountain Pond, Island Pond, and Binney Pond, comprise headwaters of the Millers River, which flows southwest into Massachusetts, part of the Connecticut River watershed.

Much of the town is made up of the wooded foothills of the Wapack Range. Secondary growth forests have reclaimed the vast majority of the pasture lands that dominated New Ipswich and much of New England at the beginning of the 20th century.

== Demographics ==
Historical population
Census	Pop.	Note	%±
1790	1,241		—
1800	1,266		2.0%
1810	1,895		49.7%
1820	1,278		−32.6%
1830	1,673		30.9%
1840	1,578		−5.7%
1850	1,877		18.9%
1860	1,701		−9.4%
1870	1,380		−18.9%
1880	1,222		−11.4%
1890	969		−20.7%
1900	911		−6.0%
1910	927		1.8%
1920	869		−6.3%
1930	838		−3.6%
1940	940		12.2%
1950	1,147		22.0%
1960	1,455		26.9%
1970	1,803		23.9%
1980	2,433		34.9%
1990	4,014		65.0%
2000	4,289		6.9%
2010	5,099		18.9%
2020	5,204		2.1%
2024 (est.)	5,405		3.9%
U.S. Decennial Census

As of the census of 2000, there were 4,289 people, 1,350 households, and 1,089 families residing in the town. The population density was 131.0 inhabitants per square mile (50.6/km^{2}). There were 1,449 housing units at an average density of 44.2 per square mile (17.1/km^{2}). The racial makeup of the town was 98.55% White, 0.19% African American, 0.12% Native American, 0.37% Asian, 0.14% from other races, and 0.63% from two or more races. Hispanic or Latino of any race were 0.79% of the population. 19.7% were of Finnish, 13.2% French, 13.0% English, 10.4% Irish, 9.7% French Canadian, 6.5% German and 5.6% American ancestry according to Census 2000.

There were 1,350 households, out of which 45.6% had children under the age of 18 living with them, 69.6% were married couples living together, 7.2% had a female householder with no husband present, and 19.3% were non-families. 15.2% of all households were made up of individuals, and 5.6% had someone living alone who was 65 years of age or older. The average household size was 3.16 and the average family size was 3.55.

In the town, the population was spread out, with 34.5% under the age of 18, 7.7% from 18 to 24, 29.8% from 25 to 44, 20.4% from 45 to 64, and 7.5% who were 65 years of age or older. The median age was 32 years. For every 100 females, there were 104.8 males. For every 100 females age 18 and over, there were 101.7 males.

The median income for a household in the town was $53,939, and the median income for a family was $57,865. Males had a median income of $40,887 versus $26,724 for females. The per capita income for the town was $20,210. About 4.3% of families and 7.1% of the population were below the poverty line, including 10.5% of those under age 18 and 10.1% of those age 65 or over.

New Ipswich has one of the highest population percentages of residents under the age of 18 in New Hampshire.

== Arts and culture ==
Notable sites:

- New Hampshire Historical Marker No. 10: First Textile Mills
- New Hampshire Historical Marker No. 101: Site of Wilder's Chair Factory
- New Hampshire Historical Marker No. 137: Barrett House
- New Ipswich Center Village Historic District, added to the National Register of Historic Places in 1991
  - Includes New Ipswich Town Hall and Barrett House

== Notable people ==
All born in New Ipswich, unless noted otherwise

- Nathan Appleton (1779–1861), merchant and United States Representative from Massachusetts
- Samuel Appleton (1766–1853), merchant and philanthropist; brother of Nathan Appleton
- Cecil Bancroft (1839–1901), educator and eighth principal of Phillips Academy in Andover, Massachusetts
- Benjamin Champney (1817–1907), artist
- Jonas Chickering (1798–1853), piano manufacturer (born in Mason Village, raised in New Ipswich)
- Augustus Addison Gould (1805–1866), Harvard-educated conchologist and malacologist.
- Isabella Batchelder James (1819–1901), writer, abolitionist, and president of the Pennsylvania Freedmen's Commission
- John Taylor Jones (1802–1851), early Protestant missionary to Thailand
- Charles Stetson (1801–1863), United States Representative from Maine
- Rodney Wallace (1823–1903), United States Representative from Massachusetts
