= Mason, New Hampshire =

- Town
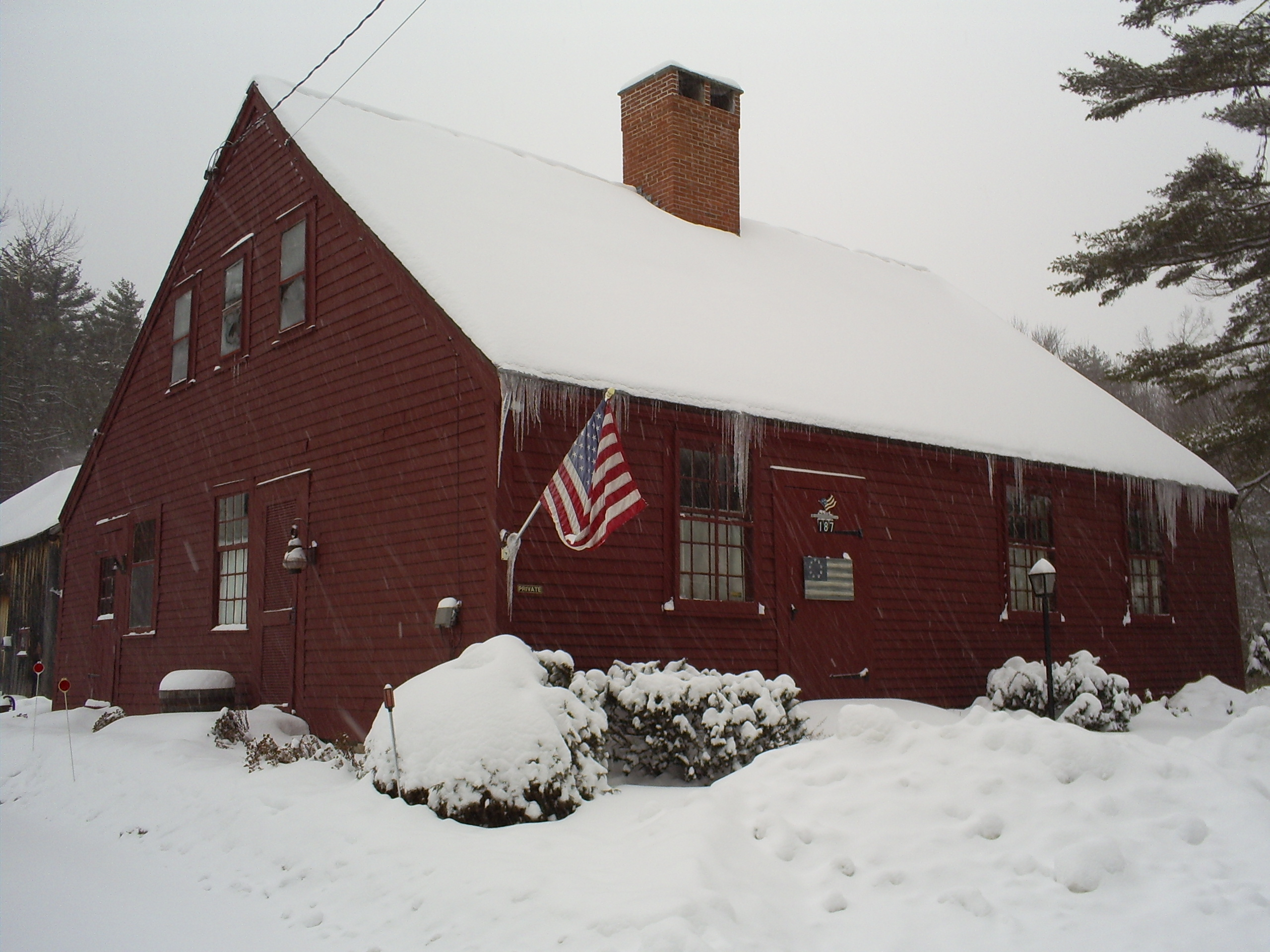
- Uncle Sam's house

- Seal

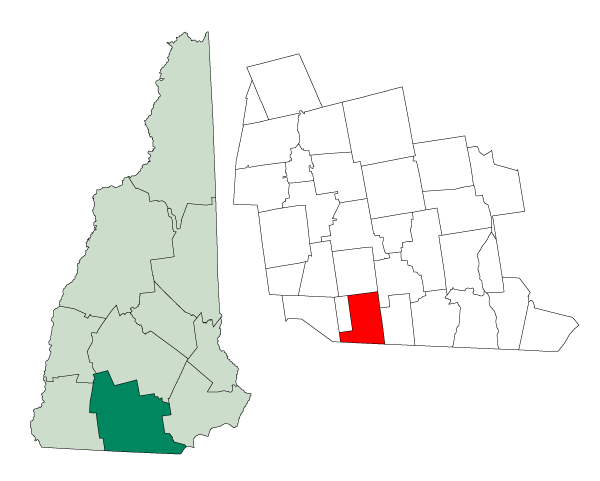
- Location in Hillsborough County, New Hampshire
- Coordinates: 42°45′15″N 71°45′08″W
- Country: United States
- State: New Hampshire
- County: Hillsborough
- Incorporated: 1768

Area
  - Total: 24.0 sq mi (62.1 km^{2})
  - Land: 23.9 sq mi (62.0 km^{2})
  - Water: 0.039 sq mi (0.1 km^{2}) 0.23%
- Elevation: 719 ft (219 m)

Population (2020)
  - Total: 1,448
  - Density: 61/sq mi (23.4/km^{2})
- Time zone: UTC-5 (Eastern)
  - Summer (DST): UTC-4 (Eastern)
- ZIP codes: 03048 (Mason); 03086 (Wilton)
- Area code: 603
- FIPS code: 33-46260
- GNIS feature ID: 873661
- Website: masonnh.us

Mason is a town in Hillsborough County, New Hampshire, United States. The population was 1,448 at the 2020 census. Mason, together with Wilton, is home to Russell-Abbott State Forest.

== History ==
Mason was first known as "Number One", the easternmost in a line of border towns including area allotted to the Province of New Hampshire after its border with neighboring Massachusetts was fixed in 1739. The town was granted its own charter in 1749 by colonial governor Benning Wentworth, and in 1768 his nephew, Governor John Wentworth, named it in honor of New Hampshire's founder, Captain John Mason, who along with Sir Ferdinando Gorges had been granted the territory in 1622 by the Council of New England. In 1629 the land grant was split between the two proprietors, with Gorges retaining the eastern portion of the territory (present-day Maine), and Mason holding the patent with title to the land that became New Hampshire.

Greenville was set off from Mason in 1872.

Near the center of Mason is the boyhood home of Samuel Wilson, the meat supplier who is believed to have inspired the Uncle Sam character. The private house is today identified by a state historical marker. Another prominent local figure was Elizabeth Orton Jones, an author, illustrator and teacher better known as "Twig". Jones is noted for her recording of town history and her dedication to Andy's Summer Playhouse, a renowned youth theater founded in Mason. Pickity Place, a local cottage built in 1759 by Ebenezer Blood, was the model for the grandmother's house in Jones' 1948 illustrated version of "Little Red Riding Hood". Pickity Place was created by David and Judith Walter.

== Geography ==
According to the United States Census Bureau, the town has a total area of 24.0 square miles (62.1 km^{2}), of which 0.04 square miles (0.1 km^{2}) are water, comprising 0.23% of the town. Mason is drained to the east by Spaulding Brook, Gould Mill Brook, and Wallace Brook, tributaries of the Nissitissit River, and to the south by Walker Brook, a tributary of the Squannacook River in Massachusetts. The Nissitissit and Squannacook are both tributaries of the Nashua River, and the entire town is thereby part of the Merrimack River watershed. The town's highest point is 1,100 feet (340 m) above sea level, on an unnamed summit near the border with Greenville.

Mason is bordered by New Ipswich and Greenville to the west, Wilton to the north, Milford to the northeast, Brookline to the east, and Ashby, Massachusetts, and Townsend, Massachusetts, to the south.

The town is served by state routes 31, 123 and 124.

=== Adjacent municipalities ===
- Wilton (north)
- Milford (northeast)
- Brookline (east)
- Townsend, Massachusetts (southeast)
- Ashby, Massachusetts (southwest)
- New Ipswich (west)
- Greenville (west)

== Demographics ==
Historical population
Census	Pop.	Note	%±
1790	922		—
1800	1,179		27.9%
1810	1,077		−8.7%
1820	1,313		21.9%
1830	1,403		6.9%
1840	1,275		−9.1%
1850	1,626		27.5%
1860	1,559		−4.1%
1870	1,364		−12.5%
1880	645		−52.7%
1890	629		−2.5%
1900	459		−27.0%
1910	325		−29.2%
1920	278		−14.5%
1930	254		−8.6%
1940	249		−2.0%
1950	288		15.7%
1960	349		21.2%
1970	518		48.4%
1980	792		52.9%
1990	1,212		53.0%
2000	1,147		−5.4%
2010	1,382		20.5%
2020	1,448		4.8%
2024 (est.)	1,461		0.9%
U.S. Decennial Census

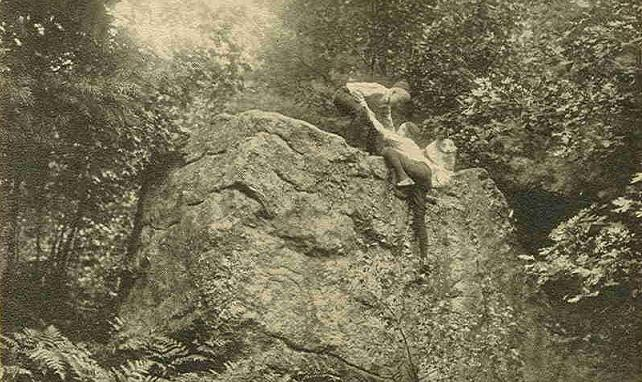
Wolf Rock in 1909

As of the census of 2000, there were 1,147 people, 433 households, and 328 families residing in the town. The population density was 48.0 inhabitants per square mile (18.5/km^{2}). There were 455 housing units at an average density of 19.0 per square mile (7.3/km^{2}). The racial makeup of the town was 98.08% White, 0.17% African American, 0.09% Native American, 0.44% Asian, 0.44% Pacific Islander, and 0.78% from two or more races. Hispanic or Latino of any race were 0.96% of the population.

There were 433 households, out of which 31.9% had children under the age of 18 living with them, 65.8% were married couples living together, 5.5% had a female householder with no husband present, and 24.2% were non-families. 18.0% of all households were made up of individuals, and 6.2% had someone living alone who was 65 years of age or older. The average household size was 2.65 and the average family size was 3.02.

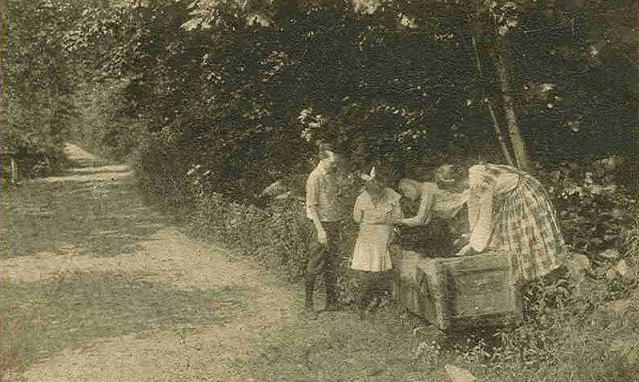
Watering trough in 1909

In the town, the population was spread out, with 24.3% under the age of 18, 5.5% from 18 to 24, 33.0% from 25 to 44, 28.8% from 45 to 64, and 8.5% who were 65 years of age or older. The median age was 40 years. For every 100 females, there were 106.3 males. For every 100 females age 18 and over, there were 106.7 males.

The median income for a household in the town was $60,433, and the median income for a family was $61,908. Males had a median income of $43,558 versus $26,042 for females. The per capita income for the town was $28,503. About 3.6% of families and 3.4% of the population were below the poverty line, including 3.3% of those under age 18 and 4.9% of those age 65 or over.

== Town facilities ==
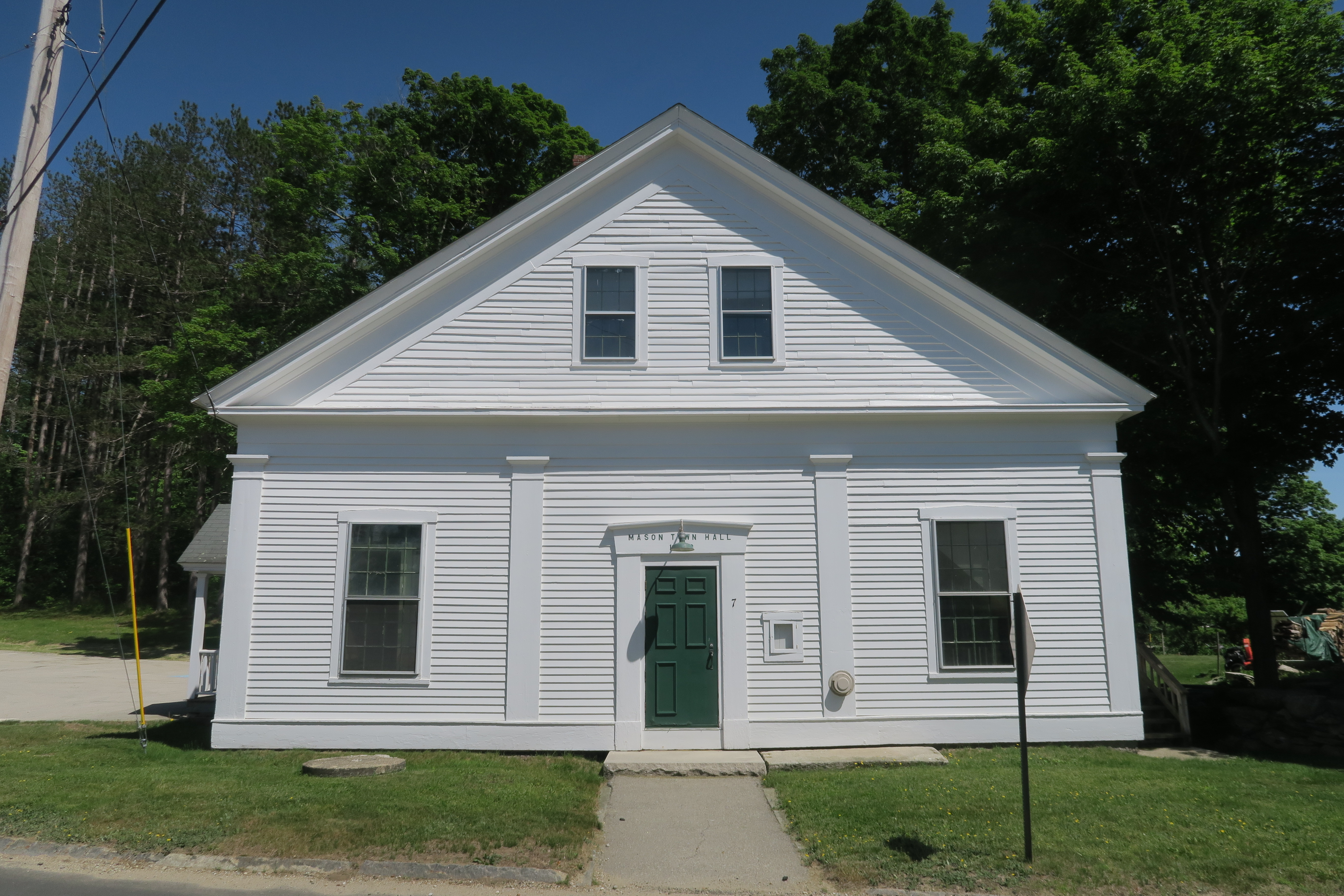
Mason Town Hall

Mason is immediately north of the Massachusetts border, with the center of town about 3 miles (5 km) from the state line. At the center of town are five public buildings: the library, elementary school, meetinghouse, church, and police station, all situated where Darling Hill, Old Ashby, Merriam Hill, Meetinghouse Hill and Valley roads meet. The students at the public middle and high school are tuitioned to Milford, which is northeast of Mason. To the west is Greenville, location of the shared post office. On Depot Road, less than a mile down the hill from town center, is the Volunteer Fire and EMS Department and Town Highway Department.

== Notable people ==
- C. W. Anderson (1891–1971), author, illustrator
- John Boynton (1791–1868), founder of Worcester Polytechnic Institute
- F. Ross Holland, Jr. (1927–2005), historian; best known for his books about American lighthouses
- Elizabeth Orton Jones (1910–2005), children's book author and illustrator
- Elizabeth Augusta Russell (1832–1911), philanthropist, reformer, and restaurateur
- Samuel Wilson (1766–1854), meat-packer, legendary potential origin of "Uncle Sam"
- Walter A. Wood (1815–1892), US congressman
