= Greenville, New Hampshire =

Town in New Hampshire, United States

- Town
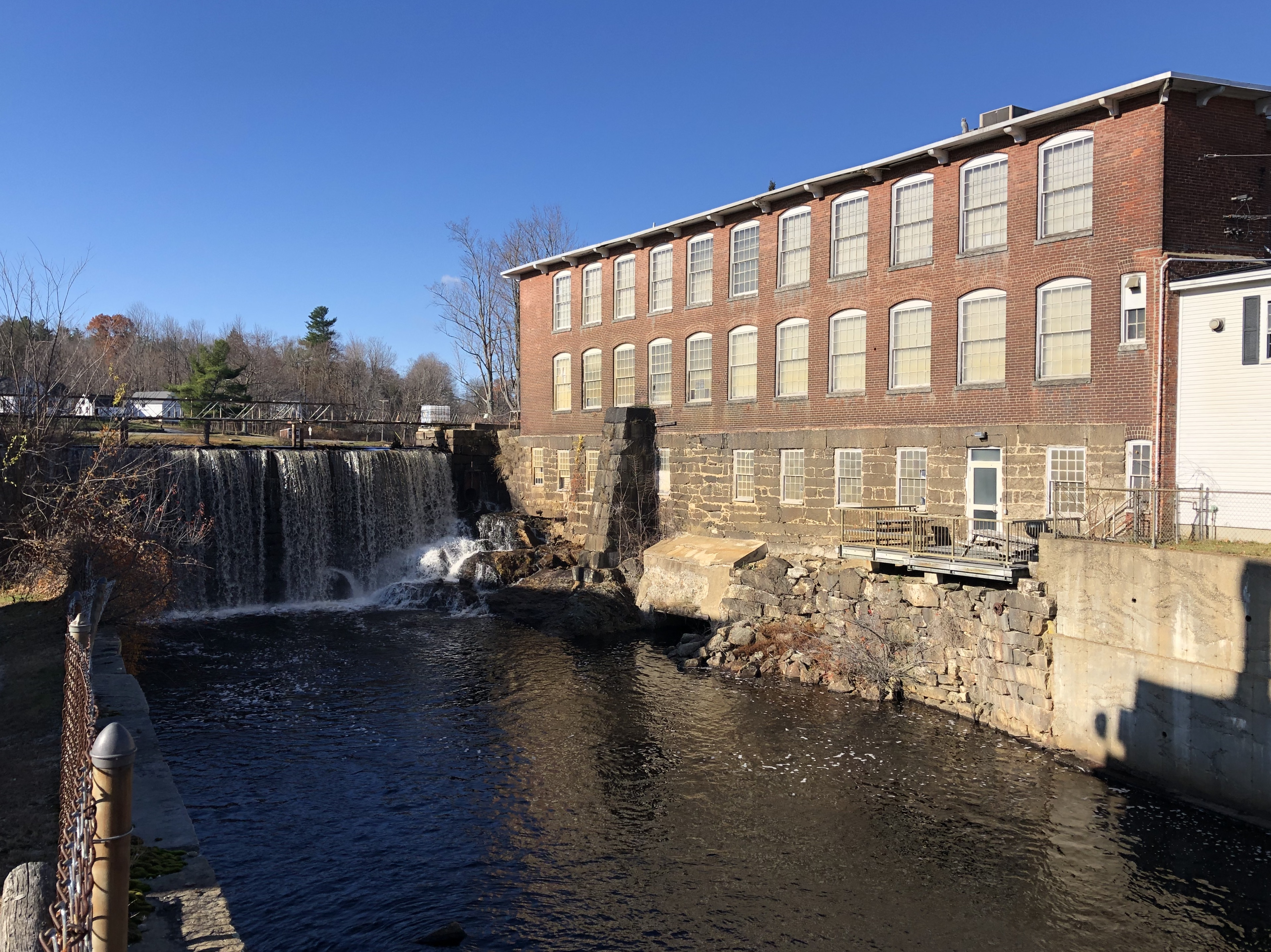
- The Souhegan River in the center of Greenville

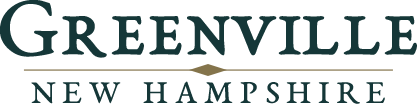
- Logo

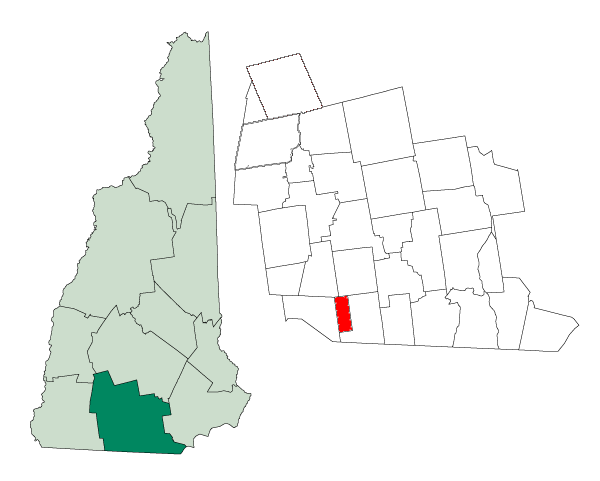
- Location in Hillsborough County, New Hampshire
- Coordinates: 42°44′58″N 71°47′52″W
- Country: United States
- State: New Hampshire
- County: Hillsborough
- Incorporated: 1872

Government
  - Board of selectmen: Kathleen McNamara, Chair; Charles Buttrick; Daniel Sadkowski
  - Town Administrator: Tara Sousa

Area
  - Total: 6.9 sq mi (17.8 km^{2})
  - Land: 6.9 sq mi (17.8 km^{2})
  - Water: 0 sq mi (0.0 km^{2})
- Elevation: 909 ft (277 m)

Population (2020)
  - Total: 1,974
  - Density: 287/sq mi (110.8/km^{2})
- Time zone: UTC-5 (Eastern)
  - Summer (DST): UTC-4 (Eastern)
- ZIP code: 03048
- Area code: 603
- FIPS code: 33-31940
- GNIS feature ID: 873613
- Website: www.greenvillenh.org

Greenville is a town in Hillsborough County, New Hampshire, United States. The population was 1,974 at the 2020 census, down from 2,105 at the 2010 census. It is located at the junctions of New Hampshire routes 31, 45, and 123. It contains the census-designated place of the same name.

== History ==
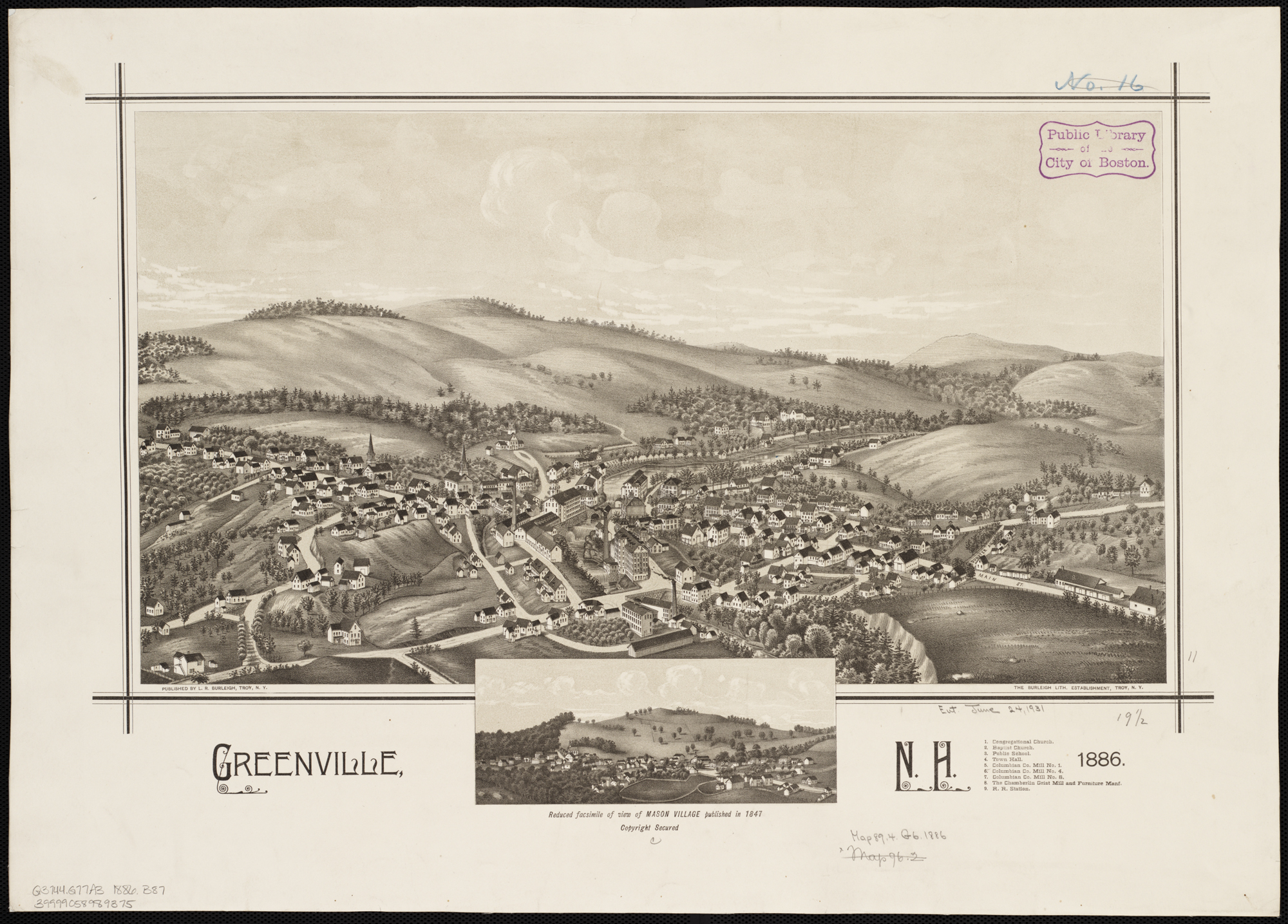
Print of Greenville from 1886 by L.R. Burleigh with a list of landmarks as well as an inset facsimile of an 1847 rendering of Mason Village

Once a part of Mason called "Mason Village", Greenville is one of the state's newest and smallest towns, incorporated in 1872. It is located at the High Falls on the Souhegan River, whose plentiful water power provided the mill town with the state's first industries, making cotton and woolen goods. Because of the falls, Greenville was always a manufacturing center. The Columbian Manufacturing Company was established in 1826 to make textiles in both Greenville and neighboring New Ipswich. The Columbian is long gone, but its fine brick buildings still dominate the village, kept company by Queen Anne style houses on side streets. The mills are now used for other businesses and storage, and one has been converted into housing for the elderly.

Greenville once had a Boston & Maine Railroad trestle. Before it was dismantled for safety reasons, local residents turned out one sunny afternoon to watch Bronson Potter, Mason resident and inventor, fly a private airplane underneath the span on a wager. The railroad depot, which still stands, was once an important landmark that put the tiny towns of Mason and Greenville "on the map". It has since been turned into a Chinese restaurant and lounge.

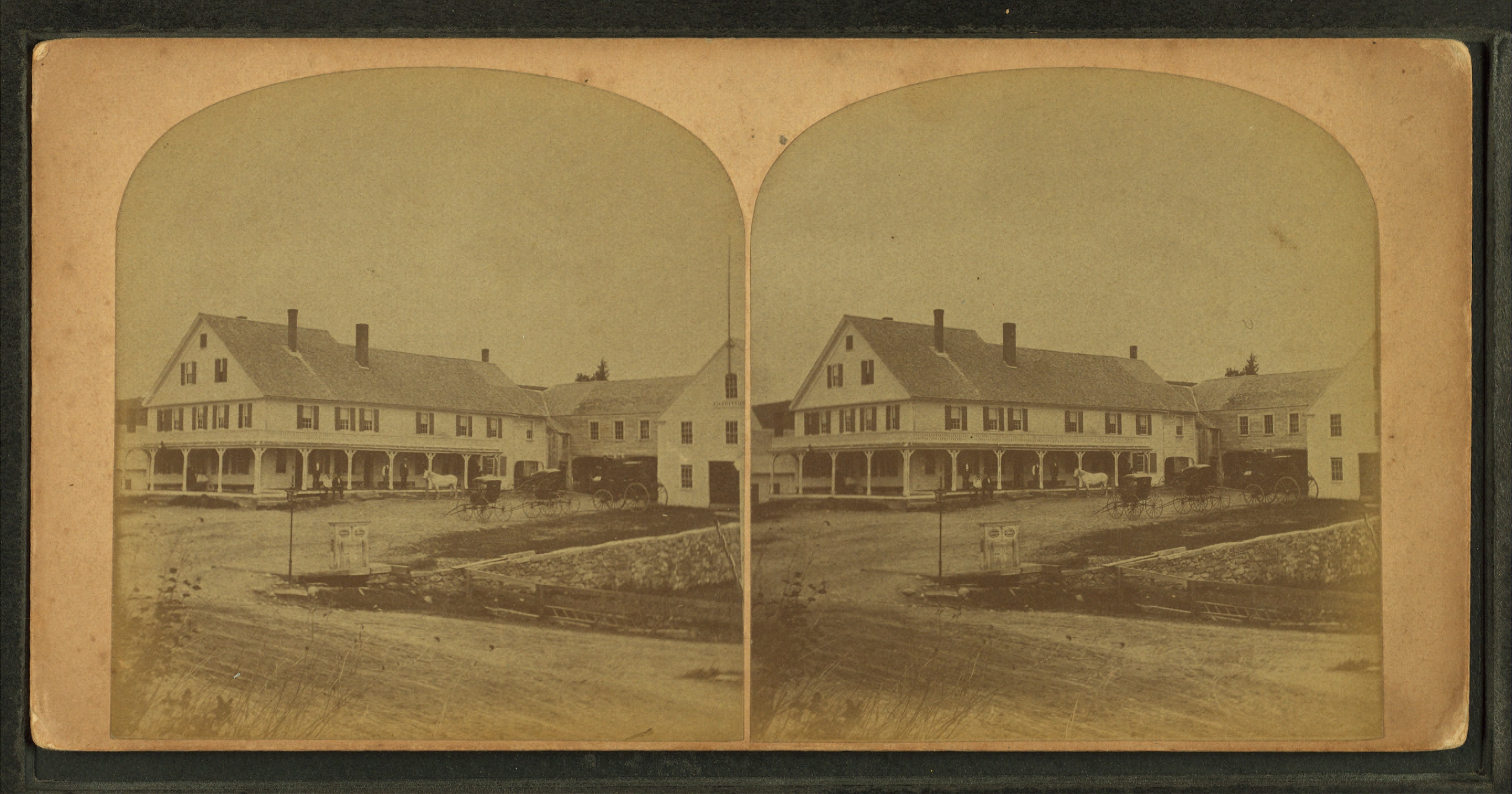
Columbian Hotel c. 1880

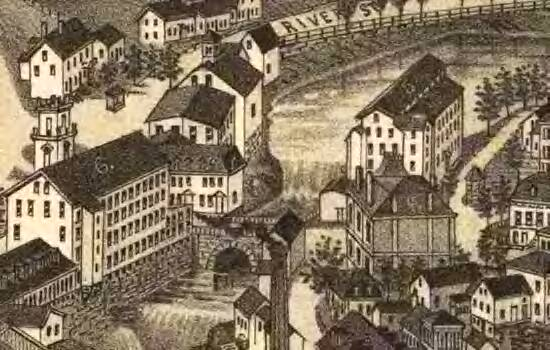
View of the mills in 1886

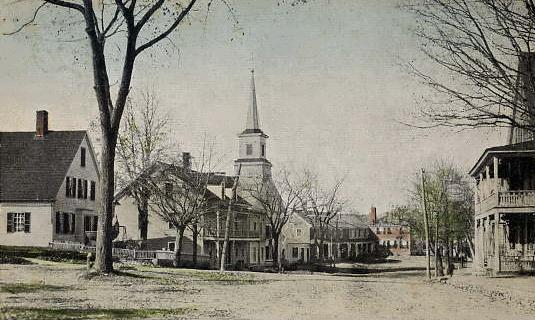
East Main Street in 1919

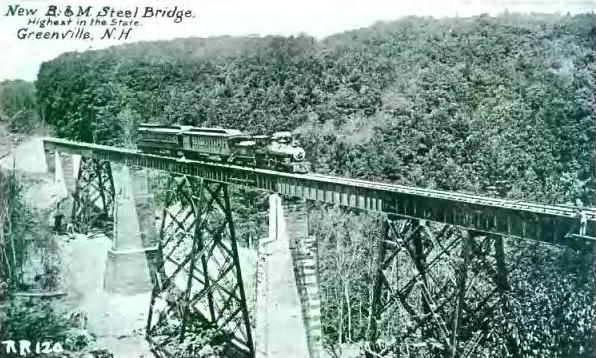
B. & M. trestle c. 1915

== Geography ==
According to the United States Census Bureau, the town has a total area of 6.9 square miles (17.8 km^{2}), all of it recorded as land. The Greenville CDP, which includes the town center, occupies the northern part of the town and has an area of 3.4 sq mi (8.8 km^{2}). The Souhegan River passes through the town center.

Greenville's highest point is Barrett Hill, near the western border of the town, with an elevation of 1,270 feet (390 m) above sea level. The northern half of the town is drained by the Souhegan River, while the southern half is drained by tributaries of Walker Brook and Mason Brook, which flow south to the Squannacook River, a tributary of the Nashua River in Massachusetts. The entire town is within the Merrimack River watershed.

=== Adjacent municipalities ===
- Wilton (north)
- Mason (east and south)
- New Ipswich (west)
- Temple (northwest)

=== Roadways ===
Four state highways traverse Greenville. NH Route 31 enters the state in Mason from Ashby, Massachusetts, on MA Route 31. NH 31 intersects NH 124 before entering Greenville. NH 31 runs north–south for the entire length of the town before entering Wilton to the north. The highway shares a right-of-way with NH Route 123 which intersects it and runs north to Pleasant Street. Pleasant Street is the main access road to downtown Greenville from NH 31 in the south. NH 123 continues on a left turn in downtown Greenville and runs south to New Ipswich and NH 124. Further down Main Street in Greenville is the beginning of NH Route 45, which runs northwest to Temple, ending at NH Route 101. NH Route 124 crosses the southwest corner of Greenville but intersects no other highways within the town limits.

=== Climate ===
According to the Köppen Climate Classification system, Greenville has a warm-summer humid continental climate, abbreviated "Dfb" on climate maps.

Climate data for Greenville, New Hampshire, 1991–2020 normals, extremes 2000–present
Month	Jan	Feb	Mar	Apr	May	Jun	Jul	Aug	Sep	Oct	Nov	Dec	Year
Record high °F (°C)	65 (18)	70 (21)	79 (26)	92 (33)	92 (33)	100 (38)	104 (40)	104 (40)	100 (38)	94 (34)	80 (27)	76 (24)	104 (40)
Mean maximum °F (°C)	54.7 (12.6)	54.5 (12.5)	62.7 (17.1)	76.5 (24.7)	86.6 (30.3)	89.5 (31.9)	91.1 (32.8)	87.7 (30.9)	85.7 (29.8)	74.9 (23.8)	67.3 (19.6)	56.1 (13.4)	92.9 (33.8)
Mean daily maximum °F (°C)	30.2 (−1.0)	34.2 (1.2)	41.5 (5.3)	54.7 (12.6)	66.3 (19.1)	74.1 (23.4)	79.4 (26.3)	77.8 (25.4)	70.4 (21.3)	57.9 (14.4)	46.3 (7.9)	35.5 (1.9)	55.7 (13.2)
Daily mean °F (°C)	22.3 (−5.4)	24.5 (−4.2)	31.9 (−0.1)	43.8 (6.6)	54.3 (12.4)	62.9 (17.2)	68.8 (20.4)	66.7 (19.3)	59.7 (15.4)	47.8 (8.8)	37.9 (3.3)	27.5 (−2.5)	45.7 (7.6)
Mean daily minimum °F (°C)	14.4 (−9.8)	14.8 (−9.6)	22.3 (−5.4)	32.8 (0.4)	42.4 (5.8)	51.7 (10.9)	58.2 (14.6)	55.7 (13.2)	48.9 (9.4)	37.7 (3.2)	29.5 (−1.4)	19.6 (−6.9)	35.7 (2.0)
Mean minimum °F (°C)	−4.1 (−20.1)	−1.1 (−18.4)	6.3 (−14.3)	22.1 (−5.5)	31.0 (−0.6)	41.1 (5.1)	48.7 (9.3)	46.4 (8.0)	34.9 (1.6)	25.3 (−3.7)	14.9 (−9.5)	3.3 (−15.9)	−7.0 (−21.7)
Record low °F (°C)	−20 (−29)	−16 (−27)	−10 (−23)	10 (−12)	24 (−4)	32 (0)	38 (3)	38 (3)	22 (−6)	10 (−12)	0 (−18)	−10 (−23)	−20 (−29)
Average precipitation inches (mm)	3.42 (87)	3.28 (83)	4.25 (108)	4.35 (110)	3.73 (95)	4.26 (108)	3.64 (92)	3.84 (98)	4.25 (108)	5.42 (138)	4.11 (104)	4.96 (126)	49.51 (1,257)
Average snowfall inches (cm)	19.2 (49)	19.2 (49)	15.7 (40)	2.9 (7.4)	0.0 (0.0)	0.0 (0.0)	0.0 (0.0)	0.0 (0.0)	0.0 (0.0)	0.4 (1.0)	1.9 (4.8)	16.1 (41)	75.4 (192.2)
Average precipitation days (≥ 0.01 in)	9.0	7.2	8.6	9.3	10.9	10.5	9.0	8.4	7.9	9.4	8.7	9.2	108.1
Average snowy days (≥ 0.1 in)	6.1	5.4	4.2	1.2	0.0	0.0	0.0	0.0	0.0	0.2	1.2	4.0	22.3
Source 1: NOAA
Source 2: National Weather Service (mean maxima and minima 2006–2020)

== Demographics ==
Historical population
Census	Pop.	Note	%±
1880	1,072		—
1890	1,255		17.1%
1900	1,608		28.1%
1910	1,374		−14.6%
1920	1,346		−2.0%
1930	1,319		−2.0%
1940	1,236		−6.3%
1950	1,280		3.6%
1960	1,385		8.2%
1970	1,587		14.6%
1980	1,988		25.3%
1990	2,231		12.2%
2000	2,224		−0.3%
2010	2,105		−5.4%
2020	1,974		−6.2%
2024 (est.)	2,005		1.6%
U.S. Decennial Census

As of the census of 2010, there were 2,105 people, 861 households, and 537 families residing in the town. There were 933 housing units, of which 72, or 7.7%, were vacant. The racial makeup of the town was 97.0% white, 0.6% African American, 0.5% Native American, 0.1% Asian, 0.2% Native Hawaiian or Pacific Islander, 0.2% some other race, and 1.4% from two or more races. 2.2% of the population were Hispanic or Latino of any race.

Of the 861 households, 30.1% had children under the age of 18 living with them, 42.9% were headed by married couples living together, 13.8% had a female householder with no husband present, and 37.6% were non-families. 29.3% of all households were made up of individuals, and 10.2% were someone living alone who was 65 years of age or older. The average household size was 2.44, and the average family size was 3.02.

In the town, 23.2% of the population were under the age of 18, 8.0% were from 18 to 24, 23.3% from 25 to 44, 32.7% from 45 to 64, and 12.6% were 65 years of age or older. The median age was 41.6 years. For every 100 females, there were 98.6 males. For every 100 females age 18 and over, there were 96.7 males.

For the period 2011–2015, the estimated median annual income for a household was $52,602, and the median income for a family was $63,850. The per capita income for the town was $24,457. 13.8% of the population and 8.6% of families were below the poverty line. 24.9% of the population under the age of 18 and 11.7% of those 65 or older were living in poverty.

== Notable people ==
- Henry Richardson (1917–1981), New Hampshire's first African American state legislator
- Brian Viglione (born 1979), drummer for The Dresden Dolls

== See also ==
- Greenville Wildlife Park, a small zoo that closed in 2003
