= 2022 New Hampshire House of Representatives election =

- November 8, 2022

All 400 seats in the New Hampshire House of Representatives 201 seats needed for a majority
	Majority party	Minority party
Leader	Sherman Packard	David Cote
Party	Republican	Democratic
Leader's seat	Rockingham 16	Hillsborough 3
Last election	213	187
Seats after	201	199
Seat change	▼12	▲12
Popular vote	1,049,787	1,097,393
Percentage	48.63%	50.84%
Swing	▼2.26%	▲1.93%
- Results: Republican hold Republican gain Democratic hold Democratic gain
Speaker before election
Sherman Packard
Republican
Elected Speaker
Sherman Packard
Republican

The 2022 New Hampshire House of Representatives election was held in the U.S. state of New Hampshire on November 8, 2022, to elect all 400 members of the House of Representatives of the 168th New Hampshire General Court.

A primary election was held in many districts on September 13, 2022. The election coincided with the election of the other house of the General Court, the New Hampshire Senate, and other elections.

Democrats gained 12 seats, decreasing the Republican majority to a narrow 201 out of 400 seats. Results showed a near-tied House, with the deciding seat coming down to Manchester Ward 6, initially reported to have been won by Republican Larry Gagne by 23 votes. Due to the extraordinarily close margin of the victory, a series of recounts and legal challenges have followed, leaving the state of the race uncertain. Democrat Maxine Mosley was elected by 1 vote after a recount. This cut the GOP majority to four seats. This individual race gained national attention, due to both its close nature and its pivotal role in deciding control of the state House.

== Predictions ==
Source	Ranking	As of
Sabato's Crystal Ball	Lean R	October 28, 2022

== Results summary ==
=== Election ===
2022 New Hampshire House of Representatives election General election — November 8, 2022
New Hampshire House of Representatives 2022
Party	Votes	Percentage	Seats	+/–
Republican	1,049,787	48.63	201	▼12
Democratic	1,097,393	50.84	199	▲12
Independents	9,026	0.42	0	
Libertarian	323	0.01	0	
Write-in	1,998	0.09	0	
Totals	2,158,527	100	400	—

== Results ==
District		Incumbent	Party	District		Elected representative	Party
Belknap	1	Tom Ploszaj	Rep	Belknap	1	Tom Ploszaj	Rep
Belknap	2	Glen Aldrich	Rep	Belknap	2	Matthew Coker	Dem
Belknap	2	Harry Bean	Rep	Belknap	2	Lisa Smart	Rep
Belknap	2	Jonathan Mackie	Rep	Belknap	3	Juliet Harvey-Bolia	Rep
Belknap	2	Norm Silber	Rep	Belknap	4	Travis O'Hara	Rep
Belknap	3	Mike Bordes	Rep	Belknap	5	Mike Bordes	Rep
Belknap	3	Gregg Hough	Rep	Belknap	5	Steven Bogert	Rep
Belknap	3	Dawn Johnson	Rep	Belknap	5	David Huot	Dem
Belknap	3	Richard Littlefield	Rep	Belknap	5	Charlie St. Clair	Dem
Belknap	4	Juliet Harvey-Bolia	Rep	Belknap	6	Harry Bean	Rep
Belknap	4	Timothy P. Lang	Rep	Belknap	6	Richard Beaudoin	Rep
Belknap	5	Paul Terry	Rep	Belknap	6	Russell Dumais	Rep
Belknap	5	Peter Varney	Rep	Belknap	6	David Nagel	Rep
Belknap	6	Douglas Trottier	Rep	Belknap	7	Barbara Comtois	Rep
Belknap	6	Michael Sylvia	Rep	Belknap	7	Paul Terry	Rep
Belknap	7	Barbara Comtois	Rep	Belknap	7	Peter Varney	Rep
Belknap	8	Vacant (Note: Republican Raymond Howard resigned July 18, 2022.)		Belknap	8	Nikki McCarter	Rep
Belknap	9	Travis O'Hara	Rep	Belknap	8	Douglas Trottier	Rep
Carroll	1	Anita Burroughs	Dem	Carroll	1	Thomas Buco	Dem
Carroll	2	Thomas Buco	Dem	Carroll	1	David Paige	Dem
Carroll	2	Karen Umberger	Rep	Carroll	1	Stephen Woodcock	Dem
Carroll	2	Stephen Woodcock	Dem	Carroll	2	Anita Burroughs	Dem
Carroll	3	Jerry Knirk	Dem	Carroll	2	Chris McAleer	Dem
Carroll	3	Mark McConkey	Rep	Carroll	3	Richard Brown	Rep
Carroll	4	Glenn Cordelli	Rep	Carroll	3	Karel Crawford	Rep
Carroll	4	Karel Crawford	Rep	Carroll	4	Lino Avellani	Rep
Carroll	5	Lino Avellani	Rep	Carroll	4	Mike Belcher	Rep
Carroll	5	Jonathan Smith	Rep	Carroll	5	Jonathan Smith	Rep
Carroll	5	Bill Nelson	Rep	Carroll	6	John MacDonald	Rep
Carroll	6	Brodie Deshaies	Rep	Carroll	6	Katy Peternel	Rep
Carroll	6	John MacDonald	Rep	Carroll	7	Glenn Cordelli	Rep
Carroll	7	Chris McAleer	Dem	Carroll	8	Mark McConkey	Rep
Carroll	8	William Marsh	Dem (Note: Elected as a Republican in 2020.)	Carroll	8	Michael Costable	Rep
Cheshire	1	Michael Abbott	Dem	Cheshire	1	Nicholas Germana	Dem
Cheshire	1	Paul Berch	Dem	Cheshire	2	Dru Fox	Dem
Cheshire	1	Cathryn Harvey	Dem	Cheshire	3	Philip Jones	Dem
Cheshire	1	Lucy Weber	Dem	Cheshire	4	Jodi Newell	Dem
Cheshire	2	John Mann	Dem	Cheshire	5	Lucy Weber	Dem
Cheshire	3	Dan Eaton	Dem	Cheshire	6	Michael Abbott	Dem
Cheshire	4	Lawrence Welkowitz	Dem	Cheshire	6	Cathryn Harvey	Dem
Cheshire	5	John Bordenet	Dem	Cheshire	7	Shaun Filiault	Dem
Cheshire	6	Dru Fox	Dem	Cheshire	8	Lucius Parshal	Dem
Cheshire	7	Sparky Von Plinsky	Dem	Cheshire	9	Dan Eaton	Dem
Cheshire	8	Donovan Fenton	Dem	Cheshire	10	Barrett Faulkner	Dem
Cheshire	9	Richard Ames	Dem	Cheshire	10	Bruce Tatro	Dem
Cheshire	9	Andrew Maneval	Dem	Cheshire	11	Zachary Nutting	Rep
Cheshire	10	Lucius Parshall	Dem	Cheshire	12	Dick Thackston	Rep
Cheshire	11	John B. Hunt	Rep	Cheshire	13	Richard Ames	Dem
Cheshire	11	Jim Qualey	Rep	Cheshire	14	John B. Hunt	Rep
Cheshire	12	Barrett Faulkner	Dem	Cheshire	15	Renee Monteil	Dem
Cheshire	12	Jennie Gomarlo	Dem	Cheshire	15	Amanda Toll	Dem
Cheshire	13	Ben Kilanski	Rep	Cheshire	16	Joe Schapiro	Dem
Cheshire	14	Matthew Santonastaso	Rep	Cheshire	17	Jennifer Rhodes	Rep
Cheshire	15	Jennifer Rhodes	Rep	Cheshire	18	Jim Qualey	Rep
Cheshire	16	Joe Schapiro	Dem	Cheshire	18	Matthew Santonastaso	Rep
Cheshire	16	Amanda Toll	Dem	Seat abolished			
Coös	1	Vacant (Note: Republican Donald Dostie resigned October 27, 2021.)		Coos	1	Troy Merner	Rep
Coös	1	Dennis Thompson	Rep	Coos	1	James W. Tierney Jr.	Rep
Coös	2	Arnold Davis	Rep	Coos	2	Arnold Davis	Rep
Coös	3	Larry Laflamme	Dem	Coos	3	Mike Ouellet	Rep
Coös	3	Eamon Kelley	Dem	Coos	4	Seth King	Rep
Coös	3	Robert Theberge	Rep	Coos	5	Corinne Cascadden	Dem
Coös	4	Kevin Craig	Rep	Coos	5	Henry King	Dem
Coös	5	Edith Tucker	Dem	Coos	6	William Hatch	Dem
Coös	6	William Hatch	Dem	Coos	7	Eamon Kelley	Dem
Coös	7	Troy Merner	Rep	Seat abolished			
Grafton	1	Joseph DePalma	Rep	Grafton	1	Linda Massimilla	Dem
Grafton	1	Linda Massimilla	Dem	Grafton	1	David Rochefort	Rep
Grafton	2	Timothy Egan	Dem	Grafton	1	Matthew Simon	Rep
Grafton	3	Vacant (Note: Democrat Dennis Ruprecht resigned December 17, 2021.)		Grafton	2	Jared Sullivan	Dem
Grafton	4	Rick Ladd	Rep	Grafton	3	Jerry Stringham	Dem
Grafton	5	Bonnie Ham	Rep	Grafton	4	Heather Baldwin	Dem
Grafton	6	Gail Sanborn	Rep	Grafton	5	Rick Ladd	Rep
Grafton	7	Mark Alliegro	Rep	Grafton	5	Matt Coulon	Rep
Grafton	8	Sallie Fellows	Dem	Grafton	6	Jeffrey Greeson	Rep
Grafton	8	Suzanne Smith	Dem	Grafton	7	Tommy Hoyt	Dem
Grafton	8	Joyce Weston	Dem	Grafton	8	Bill Bolton	Dem
Grafton	9	Ned Gordon	Rep	Grafton	8	Sallie Fellows	Dem
Grafton	9	Lex Berezhny	Rep	Grafton	8	Peter Lovett	Dem
Grafton	10	Roger Dontonville	Dem	Grafton	9	Corinne Morse	Dem
Grafton	11	Beth Folsom	Rep	Grafton	10	Carroll M. Brown Jr.	Rep
Grafton	12	Mary Hakken-Phillips	Dem	Grafton	11	Lex Berezhny	Rep
Grafton	12	Russell Muirhead	Dem	Grafton	12	Mary Hakken-Phillips	Dem
Grafton	12	James M. Murphy	Dem	Grafton	12	Russell Muirhead	Dem
Grafton	12	Sharon Nordgren	Dem	Grafton	12	James M. Murphy	Dem
Grafton	13	Richard Abel	Dem	Grafton	12	Sharon Nordgren	Dem
Grafton	13	Susan Almy	Dem	Grafton	13	Laurel Stavis	Dem
Grafton	13	Laurel Stavis	Dem	Grafton	14	George Sykes	Dem
Grafton	13	George Sykes	Dem	Grafton	15	Thomas H. Cormen	Dem
Grafton	14	Matthew Simon	Rep	Grafton	16	Joshua Adjutant	Dem
Grafton	15	David Binford	Rep	Grafton	17	Susan Almy	Dem
Grafton	16	Jeffrey Greeson	Rep	Grafton	18	John Sellers	Rep
Grafton	17	Joshua Adjutant	Dem	Seat abolished			
Hillsborough	1	Jim Fedolfi	Rep	Hillsborough	1	Kimberly Abare	Rep
Hillsborough	1	Marjorie Porter	Dem	Hillsborough	1	Tom Mannion	Rep
Hillsborough	2	Keith Erf	Rep	Hillsborough	1	Sandra Panek	Rep
Hillsborough	2	Gary Hopper	Rep	Hillsborough	1	Jeffrey Tenczar	Rep
Hillsborough	2	Leah Cushman	Rep	Hillsborough	2	Loren Foxx	Dem
Hillsborough	3	Vacant (Note: Democrat Dan Pickering resigned November 12, 2021.)		Hillsborough	2	Ted Gorski	Rep
Hillsborough	4	Linda Gould	Rep	Hillsborough	2	Linda Gould	Rep
Hillsborough	4	Lisa Post	Rep	Hillsborough	2	Dan Hynes	Rep
Hillsborough	5	William Foster	Rep	Hillsborough	2	Kristin Noble	Rep
Hillsborough	5	Gerald Griffin	Rep	Hillsborough	2	Catherine Rombeau	Dem
Hillsborough	6	Joe Alexander	Rep	Hillsborough	2	Laurie Sanborn	Rep
Hillsborough	6	Barbara Griffin	Rep	Hillsborough	3	David Cote	Dem
Hillsborough	6	Vacant (Note: Republican Michael Gunski resigned July 27, 2021.)		Hillsborough	3	Stacie-Marie Laughton	Dem
Hillsborough	6	Fred Plett	Rep	Hillsborough	3	Fred E. Davis Jr.	Dem
Hillsborough	6	Claire Rouillard	Rep	Hillsborough	4	Ray Newman	Dem
Hillsborough	7	Catherine Rombeau	Dem	Hillsborough	4	Sue Newman	Dem
Hillsborough	7	Ted Gorski	Rep	Hillsborough	4	Linda Ryan	Dem
Hillsborough	7	Linda Gould	Rep	Hillsborough	5	Shelley Devine	Dem
Hillsborough	7	John Graham	Rep	Hillsborough	5	Susan Elberger	Dem
Hillsborough	7	Sue Mullen	Dem	Hillsborough	5	Heather Raymond	Dem
Hillsborough	7	Niki Kelsey	Rep	Hillsborough	6	Sherry Dutzy	Dem
Hillsborough	8	Jeffrey Goley	Dem	Hillsborough	6	Suzanne Vail	Dem
Hillsborough	8	Diane Langley	Dem	Hillsborough	6	Carry Spier	Dem
Hillsborough	9	Linda DiSilvestro	Dem	Hillsborough	7	Alicia Gregg	Dem
Hillsborough	9	Iz Piedra	Dem	Hillsborough	7	Louis Juris	Dem
Hillsborough	10	Jean Jeudy	Dem	Hillsborough	7	Catherine Sofikitis	Dem
Hillsborough	10	Patrick Long	Dem	Hillsborough	8	Efstathia Booras	Dem
Hillsborough	11	Donald Bouchard	Dem	Hillsborough	8	Christal Lloyd	Dem
Hillsborough	11	Nicole Klein-Knight	Dem	Hillsborough	8	Fran Nutter-Upham	Dem
Hillsborough	12	Amanda Bouldin	Dem	Hillsborough	9	William Dolan	Dem
Hillsborough	12	Vacant (Note: Democrat Andrew Bouldin resigned August 10, 2022.)		Hillsborough	9	Allison Nutting-Wong	Dem
Hillsborough	13	Larry Gagne	Rep	Hillsborough	9	Michael Pedersen	Dem
Hillsborough	13	William Infantine	Rep	Hillsborough	10	Linda Harriott-Gathright	Dem
Hillsborough	14	Mary Freitas	Dem	Hillsborough	10	Martin Jack	Dem
Hillsborough	14	Mary Heath	Dem	Hillsborough	10	Michael O'Brien	Dem
Hillsborough	15	Erika Conners	Dem	Hillsborough	11	Latha Mangipudi	Dem
Hillsborough	15	Mark Warden	Rep	Hillsborough	11	Laura Telerski	Dem
Hillsborough	16	Vacant (Note: Democrat Barbara Shaw died December 22, 2021.)		Hillsborough	11	William Darby	Dem
Hillsborough	16	Joshua Query	Dem	Hillsborough	12	William W. Boyd III	Rep
Hillsborough	17	Heidi Hamer	Dem	Hillsborough	12	Robert Healey	Rep
Hillsborough	17	Timothy Smith	Dem	Hillsborough	12	Tim McGough	Rep
Hillsborough	18	Patricia Cornell	Dem	Hillsborough	12	Maureen Mooney	Rep
Hillsborough	18	Willis Griffith	Dem	Hillsborough	12	Nancy Murphy	Dem
Hillsborough	19	Dick Marston	Rep	Hillsborough	12	Jeanine Notter	Rep
Hillsborough	19	Kendall Snow	Dem	Hillsborough	12	Rosemarie Rung	Dem
Hillsborough	20	Ralph Boehm	Rep	Hillsborough	12	Wendy Thomas	Dem
Hillsborough	20	Richard Lascelles	Rep	Hillsborough	13	Stephen Kennedy	Rep
Hillsborough	21	Melissa Blasek	Rep	Hillsborough	13	Cathy Kenny	Rep
Hillsborough	21	William W. Boyd III	Rep	Hillsborough	13	Andrew Prout	Rep
Hillsborough	21	Robert Healey	Rep	Hillsborough	13	Andrew Renzullo	Rep
Hillsborough	21	Mary Mayville	Rep	Hillsborough	13	Jordan Ulery	Rep
Hillsborough	21	Rosemarie Rung	Dem	Hillsborough	13	Robert Wherry	Rep
Hillsborough	21	Jeanine Notter	Rep	Hillsborough	14	Ralph Boehm	Rep
Hillsborough	21	Maureen Mooney	Rep	Hillsborough	14	Richard Lascelles	Rep
Hillsborough	21	Vacant (Note: Republican Lindsay Tausch resigned February 15, 2022.)		Hillsborough	15	Mark McLean	Rep
Hillsborough	22	Megan Murray	Dem	Hillsborough	15	Mark Proulx	Rep
Hillsborough	22	Daniel Veilleux	Dem	Hillsborough	16	Larry Gagne	Rep
Hillsborough	22	Vacant (Note: Independent Tony Labranche (elected as a Democrat in 2020) resigned August 8, 2022.)		Hillsborough	16	William Infantine	Rep
Hillsborough	23	Bill King	Rep	Hillsborough	17	Linda DiSilvestro	Dem
Hillsborough	23	Vanessa Sheehan	Rep	Hillsborough	17	David Preece	Dem
Hillsborough	23	María Pérez	Dem	Hillsborough	18	Jessica Grill	Dem
Hillsborough	23	Peter Petrigno	Dem	Hillsborough	18	Juliet Smith	Dem
Hillsborough	24	Peter Leishman	Dem	Hillsborough	19	Jane Beaulieu	Dem
Hillsborough	24	Ivy Vann	Dem	Hillsborough	19	Heidi Hamer	Dem
Hillsborough	25	Diane Kelley	Rep	Hillsborough	20	Candace Moulton	Dem
Hillsborough	25	Paul Somero	Rep	Hillsborough	20	Alissandra Murray	Dem
Hillsborough	26	John Lewicke	Rep	Hillsborough	21	Jeffrey Goley	Dem
Hillsborough	26	Diane Pauer	Rep	Hillsborough	21	Christine Seibert	Dem
Hillsborough	27	Susan Homola	Rep	Hillsborough	22	Patricia Cornell	Dem
Hillsborough	27	Kat McGhee	Dem	Hillsborough	22	Nicole Leapley	Dem
Hillsborough	28	Bruce Cohen	Dem	Hillsborough	23	Jean Jeudy	Dem
Hillsborough	28	Tom Lanzara	Rep	Hillsborough	23	Patrick Long	Dem
Hillsborough	28	Janice Schmidt	Dem	Hillsborough	24	Donald Bouchard	Dem
Hillsborough	29	Paul Bergeron	Dem	Hillsborough	24	Christopher Herbert	Dem
Hillsborough	29	Ray Newman	Dem	Hillsborough	25	Amanda Bouldin	Dem
Hillsborough	29	Sue Newman	Dem	Hillsborough	25	Kathy Staub	Dem
Hillsborough	30	Patricia Klee	Dem	Hillsborough	26	Brian Cole	Rep
Hillsborough	30	Sherry Dutzy	Dem	Hillsborough	26	Mary Freitas	Dem
Hillsborough	30	Suzanne Vail	Dem	Hillsborough	27	Karen Reid	Rep
Hillsborough	31	David Cote	Dem	Hillsborough	28	Leah Cushman	Rep
Hillsborough	31	Manny Espitia	Dem	Hillsborough	28	Keith Erf	Rep
Hillsborough	31	Stacie-Marie Laughton	Dem	Hillsborough	29	Joe Alexander	Rep
Hillsborough	32	Allison Nutting-Wong	Dem	Hillsborough	29	Judi Lanza	Dem
Hillsborough	32	Michael Pedersen	Dem	Hillsborough	29	Fred Plett	Rep
Hillsborough	32	Dan Toomey	Dem	Hillsborough	29	Sheila Seidel	Rep
Hillsborough	33	Efstathia Booras	Dem	Hillsborough	30	Riche Colcombe	Rep
Hillsborough	33	Mark King	Dem	Hillsborough	30	Jim Creighton	Rep
Hillsborough	33	Fran Nutter-Upham	Dem	Hillsborough	30	Jim Fedolfi	Rep
Hillsborough	34	Melbourne Moran	Dem	Hillsborough	31	Molly Howard	Dem
Hillsborough	34	Catherine Sofikitis	Dem	Hillsborough	32	Diane Kelley	Rep
Hillsborough	34	Deb Stevens	Dem	Hillsborough	32	Jim Kofalt	Rep
Hillsborough	35	Vacant (Note: Democrat Skip Cleaver resigned June 1, 2022.)		Hillsborough	32	Shane Sirois	Rep
Hillsborough	35	Latha Mangipudi	Dem	Hillsborough	33	Peter Leishman	Dem
Hillsborough	35	Laura Telerski	Dem	Hillsborough	33	Jonah Wheeler	Dem
Hillsborough	36	Linda Harriott-Gathright	Dem	Hillsborough	34	Daniel Veilleux	Dem
Hillsborough	36	Marty Jack	Dem	Hillsborough	34	Daniel LeClerc	Dem
Hillsborough	36	Michael O'Brien	Dem	Hillsborough	34	Jennifer Morton	Dem
Hillsborough	37	Vacant (Note: Republican Bob Greene resigned May 27, 2022.)		Hillsborough	35	Kat McGhee	Dem
Hillsborough	37	Alicia Lekas	Rep	Hillsborough	35	Ben Ming	Dem
Hillsborough	37	Tony Lekas	Rep	Hillsborough	36	John Lewicke	Rep
Hillsborough	37	Vacant (Note: Republican Hershel Nunez resigned August 30, 2022.)		Hillsborough	36	Diane Pauer	Rep
Hillsborough	37	Vacant (Note: Republican Lynne Ober resigned July 27, 2021.)		Hillsborough	37	Megan Murray	Dem
Hillsborough	37	Vacant (Note: Republican Russell Ober resigned July 27, 2021.)		Hillsborough	38	Alicia Lekas	Rep
Hillsborough	37	Andrew Prout	Rep	Hillsborough	38	Tony Lekas	Rep
Hillsborough	37	Andrew Renzullo	Rep	Hillsborough	39	Benjamin Baroody	Dem
Hillsborough	37	Kimberly Rice	Rep	Hillsborough	39	Ross Berry	Rep
Hillsborough	37	Denise Smith	Rep	Hillsborough	40	Matthew Wilhelm	Dem
Hillsborough	37	Jordan Ulery	Rep	Hillsborough	40	Damond Ford	Dem
Hillsborough	38	Jim Creighton	Rep	Hillsborough	40	Mark MacKenzie	Dem
Hillsborough	38	Vacant (Note: Democrat Stephanie Hyland resigned January 24, 2022.)		Hillsborough	40	Trinidad Tellez	Dem
Hillsborough	39	John Burt	Rep	Hillsborough	41	Amy Bradley	Dem
Hillsborough	40	Keith Ammon	Rep	Hillsborough	41	Jacqueline Chretien	Dem
Hillsborough	41	Laurie Sanborn	Rep	Hillsborough	41	Mary Heath	Dem
Hillsborough	42	Jacqueline Chretien	Dem	Hillsborough	42	Keith Ammon	Rep
Hillsborough	42	Matthew Wilhelm	Dem	Hillsborough	42	Gerald Griffin	Rep
Hillsborough	43	Benjamin Baroody	Dem	Hillsborough	42	Lisa Post	Rep
Hillsborough	43	Christopher Herbert	Dem	Hillsborough	43	Bill King	Rep
Hillsborough	43	Amy Bradley	Dem	Hillsborough	43	María Pérez	Dem
Hillsborough	44	Mark McLean	Rep	Hillsborough	43	Peter Petrigno	Dem
Hillsborough	44	Ross Berry	Rep	Hillsborough	43	Vanessa Sheehan	Rep
Hillsborough	45	Jane Beaulieu	Dem	Hillsborough	44	Travis Corcoran	Rep
Hillsborough	45	Connie Van Houten	Dem	Hillsborough	44	Lisa Mazur	Rep
Hillsborough	New seat			Hillsborough	45	Karen Calabro	Dem
Merrimack	1	Louise Andrus	Rep	Merrimack	1	Lorrie Carey	Dem
Merrimack	2	James Mason	Rep	Merrimack	2	Joyce Fulweiler	Rep
Merrimack	2	Dave Testerman	Rep	Merrimack	3	James Mason	Rep
Merrimack	3	Greg Hill	Rep	Merrimack	3	Dave Testerman	Rep
Merrimack	3	Kenna Cross	Rep	Merrimack	4	Jose Cambrils	Rep
Merrimack	4	Tom Schamberg	Dem	Merrimack	4	Michael Moffett	Rep
Merrimack	5	Karen Ebel	Dem	Merrimack	5	Louise Andrus	Rep
Merrimack	5	Dan Wolf	Rep	Merrimack	5	Deborah Aylward	Rep
Merrimack	6	Tony Caplan	Dem	Merrimack	6	Tom Schamberg	Dem
Merrimack	6	Rod Pimentel	Dem	Merrimack	7	Karen Ebel	Dem
Merrimack	7	Margaret Kennedy	Rep	Merrimack	7	Dan Wolf	Rep
Merrimack	8	Carolette Alicea	Dem	Merrimack	8	Tony Caplan	Dem
Merrimack	9	Jose Cambrils	Rep	Merrimack	8	Sherry Gould	Dem
Merrimack	9	Michael Moffett	Rep	Merrimack	8	Stephanie Payeur	Dem
Merrimack	10	David Luneau	Dem	Merrimack	9	Muriel Hall	Dem
Merrimack	10	Mel Myler	Dem	Merrimack	9	David Luneau	Dem
Merrimack	10	Mary Jane Wallner	Dem	Merrimack	9	Mel Myler	Dem
Merrimack	11	Steve Shurtleff	Dem	Merrimack	9	Angela Brennan	Dem
Merrimack	12	Connie Lane	Dem	Merrimack	10	Stephen Boyd	Rep
Merrimack	13	Beth Richards	Dem	Merrimack	10	John Leavitt	Rep
Merrimack	14	James MacKay	Dem	Merrimack	10	Yury Polozov	Rep
Merrimack	15	Eric Gallager	Dem	Merrimack	10	Thomas Walsh	Rep
Merrimack	16	Timothy Soucy	Dem	Merrimack	11	Alan Turcotte	Dem
Merrimack	17	Safiya Wazir	Dem	Merrimack	12	Dianne Schuett	Dem
Merrimack	18	Kris Schultz	Dem	Merrimack	12	Brian Seaworth	Rep
Merrimack	19	Christy Bartlett	Dem	Merrimack	13	Cyril Aures	Rep
Merrimack	20	Nick White	Rep	Merrimack	13	Clayton Wood	Rep
Merrimack	20	Dianne Schuett	Dem	Merrimack	14	Dan McGuire	Rep
Merrimack	20	Brian Seaworth	Rep	Merrimack	15	Stephen Shurtleff	Dem
Merrimack	21	James Allard	Rep	Merrimack	16	Connie Lane	Dem
Merrimack	21	John Klose	Rep	Merrimack	17	Beth Richards	Dem
Merrimack	22	Matthew Pitaro	Rep	Merrimack	18	James MacKay	Dem
Merrimack	23	Samantha Fox	Dem	Merrimack	19	Mary Jane Wallner	Dem
Merrimack	23	Mary Beth Walz	Dem	Merrimack	20	Eric Gallager	Dem
Merrimack	23	Gary Woods	Dem	Merrimack	21	Timothy Soucy	Dem
Merrimack	24	Stephen Boyd	Rep	Merrimack	22	James Roesener	Dem
Merrimack	24	John Leavitt	Rep	Merrimack	23	Merryl Gibbs	Dem
Merrimack	24	Thomas Walsh	Rep	Merrimack	24	Matthew Hicks	Dem
Merrimack	24	Michael Yakubovich	Rep	Merrimack	25	Jason Gerhard	Rep
Merrimack	25	Natalie Wells	Rep	Merrimack	26	Alvin See	Rep
Merrimack	26	Howard Pearl	Rep	Merrimack	27	J.R. Hoell	Rep
Merrimack	27	Art Ellison	Dem	Merrimack	27	Carol McGuire	Rep
Merrimack	27	Rebecca McWilliams	Dem	Merrimack	28	Art Ellison	Dem
Merrimack	28	Vacant (Note: Democrat Katherine Rogers died April 10, 2022.)		Merrimack	29	Kris Schultz	Dem
Merrimack	29	Carol McGuire	Rep	Merrimack	30	Rebecca McWilliams	Dem
Rockingham	1	Paul Tudor	Rep	Rockingham	1	Benjamin Bartlett	Rep
Rockingham	2	Alan Bershtein	Rep	Rockingham	1	Jacob Brouillard	Rep
Rockingham	2	James Spillane	Rep	Rockingham	1	Paul Tudor	Rep
Rockingham	2	Kevin Verville	Rep	Rockingham	2	Jason Osborne	Rep
Rockingham	3	Paul Ayer	Rep	Rockingham	2	James Spillane	Rep
Rockingham	3	Dustin Dodge	Rep	Rockingham	2	Kevin Verville	Rep
Rockingham	3	Kevin Pratt	Rep	Rockingham	3	Oliver Ford	Rep
Rockingham	4	Jess Edwards	Rep	Rockingham	4	Kevin Pratt	Rep
Rockingham	4	Oliver Ford	Rep	Rockingham	4	Tim Cahill	Rep
Rockingham	4	Jason Osborne	Rep	Rockingham	4	Mike Drago	Rep
Rockingham	4	Chris True	Rep	Rockingham	5	Mark Vallone	Dem
Rockingham	4	Tony Piemonte	Rep	Rockingham	5	Michael Vose	Rep
Rockingham	5	Al Baldasaro	Rep	Rockingham	6	Eric Turer	Dem
Rockingham	5	Tom Dolan	Rep	Rockingham	7	Emily Phillips	Rep
Rockingham	5	David Lundgren	Rep	Rockingham	8	Scott Wallace	Rep
Rockingham	5	Betsy McKinney	Rep	Rockingham	9	Tony Piemonte	Rep
Rockingham	5	Sherman Packard	Rep	Rockingham	9	Chris True	Rep
Rockingham	5	Wayne MacDonald	Rep	Rockingham	10	Michael Cahill	Dem
Rockingham	5	Douglas Thomas	Rep	Rockingham	10	Charlotte DiLorenzo	Dem
Rockingham	6	Jodi Nelson	Rep	Rockingham	10	Ellen Read	Dem
Rockingham	6	Erica Layon	Rep	Rockingham	11	Julie Gilman	Dem
Rockingham	6	David Love	Rep	Rockingham	11	Gaby Grossman	Dem
Rockingham	6	Phyllis Katsakiores	Rep	Rockingham	11	Mark Paige	Dem
Rockingham	6	David Milz	Rep	Rockingham	11	Linda Haskins	Dem
Rockingham	6	Mary Ann Kimball	Rep	Rockingham	12	Allison Knab	Dem
Rockingham	6	Katherine Prudhomme O'Brien	Rep	Rockingham	12	Zoe Manos	Dem
Rockingham	6	Stephen Pearson	Rep	Rockingham	13	Charles Foote	Rep
Rockingham	6	John Potucek	Rep	Rockingham	13	Phyllis Katsakiores	Rep
Rockingham	6	Richard Tripp	Rep	Rockingham	13	Erica Layon	Rep
Rockingham	7	Bob Lynn	Rep	Rockingham	13	David Love	Rep
Rockingham	7	Vacant (Note: Republican Mary Griffin died June 15, 2022.)		Rockingham	13	David Milz	Rep
Rockingham	7	Julius Soti	Rep	Rockingham	13	Jodi Nelson	Rep
Rockingham	7	Charles McMahon	Rep	Rockingham	13	Stephen Pearson	Rep
Rockingham	8	Daryl Abbas	Rep	Rockingham	13	John Potucek	Rep
Rockingham	8	Joe Sweeney	Rep	Rockingham	13	Katherine Prudhomme O'Brien	Rep
Rockingham	8	Susan Vandecasteele	Rep	Rockingham	13	Richard Tripp	Rep
Rockingham	8	Fred Doucette	Rep	Rockingham	14	Deborah Hobson	Rep
Rockingham	8	Robert Elliott	Rep	Rockingham	14	Kenneth Weyler	Rep
Rockingham	8	Betty Gay	Rep	Rockingham	15	Joseph Guthrie	Rep
Rockingham	8	John Janigian	Rep	Rockingham	15	Lilli Walsh	Rep
Rockingham	8	Everett McBride	Rep	Rockingham	16	Tom Dolan	Rep
Rockingham	8	John Sytek	Rep	Rockingham	16	Ron Dunn	Rep
Rockingham	9	Sean Morrison	Rep	Rockingham	16	David Lundgren	Rep
Rockingham	9	Cody Belanger	Rep	Rockingham	16	Wayne MacDonald	Rep
Rockingham	10	Dennis Acton	Rep	Rockingham	16	Sherman Packard	Rep
Rockingham	11	Melissa Litchfield	Rep	Rockingham	16	Kristine Perez	Rep
Rockingham	12	Scott Wallace	Rep	Rockingham	16	Douglas Thomas	Rep
Rockingham	13	Dennis Green	Rep	Rockingham	17	Katelyn Kuttab	Rep
Rockingham	13	Joseph Guthrie	Rep	Rockingham	17	Bob Lynn	Rep
Rockingham	13	David Welch	Rep	Rockingham	17	Charles McMahon	Rep
Rockingham	13	Kenneth Weyler	Rep	Rockingham	17	Daniel Popovici-Muller	Rep
Rockingham	14	Debra DeSimone	Rep	Rockingham	18	Debra DeSimone	Rep
Rockingham	14	Robert Harb	Rep	Rockingham	18	Arlene Quaratiello	Rep
Rockingham	14	Norman Major	Rep	Rockingham	19	Susan Porcelli	Rep
Rockingham	14	Peter Torosian	Rep	Rockingham	20	Robert Harb	Rep
Rockingham	15	Charles Melvin	Rep	Rockingham	20	Charles Melvin	Rep
Rockingham	16	JD Bernardy	Rep	Rockingham	20	James Summers	Rep
Rockingham	17	Michael Cahill	Dem	Rockingham	21	Robin Vogt	Dem
Rockingham	17	Charlotte DiLorenzo	Dem	Rockingham	22	Kate Murray	Dem
Rockingham	17	Ellen Read	Ind (Note: Elected as a Democrat in 2020)	Rockingham	23	Jim Maggiore	Dem
Rockingham	18	Mark Paige	Dem	Rockingham	24	Jaci Grote	Dem
Rockingham	18	Vacant (Note: Democrat Lisa Bunker resigned September 11, 2022.)		Rockingham	24	Dennis Malloy	Dem
Rockingham	18	Gaby Grossman	Dem	Rockingham	25	Fred Doucette	Rep
Rockingham	18	Julie Gilman	Dem	Rockingham	25	John Janigian	Rep
Rockingham	19	Patrick Abrami	Rep	Rockingham	25	Joseph Sweeney	Rep
Rockingham	19	Debra Altschiller	Dem	Rockingham	25	John Sytek	Rep
Rockingham	20	Tim Baxter	Rep	Rockingham	25	Susan Vandecasteele	Rep
Rockingham	20	Tina Harley	Rep	Rockingham	25	Lorie Ball	Rep
Rockingham	20	Aboul Khan	Rep	Rockingham	25	Tanya Donnelly	Rep
Rockingham	21	Tracy Emerick	Rep	Rockingham	25	Dennis Mannion	Rep
Rockingham	21	Vacant (Note: Democrat Renny Cushing died March 7, 2022.)		Rockingham	25	Valerie McDonnell	Rep
Rockingham	21	Mike Edgar	Dem	Rockingham	26	Joan Hamblet	Dem
Rockingham	21	Tom Loughman	Dem	Rockingham	27	Gerry Ward	Dem
Rockingham	22	Jim Maggiore	Dem	Rockingham	28	Rebecca McBeath	Dem
Rockingham	23	Dennis Malloy	Dem	Rockingham	29	Mike Edgar	Dem
Rockingham	24	Jaci Grote	Dem	Rockingham	29	Tracy Emerick	Rep
Rockingham	24	Kate Murray	Dem	Rockingham	29	Chris Muns	Dem
Rockingham	25	Laura Pantelakos	Dem	Rockingham	29	Candice O'Neil	Dem
Rockingham	26	Rebecca McBeath	Dem	Rockingham	30	Tina Harley	Rep
Rockingham	27	Peter Somssich	Dem	Rockingham	30	Aboul Khan	Rep
Rockingham	28	Gerry Ward	Dem	Rockingham	31	Jess Edwards	Rep
Rockingham	29	David Meuse	Dem	Rockingham	31	Terry Roy	Rep
Rockingham	30	Jacqueline Cali-Pitts	Dem	Rockingham	32	Josh Yokela	Rep
Rockingham	31	Joan Hamblet	Dem	Rockingham	33	Alexis Simpson	Dem
Rockingham	32	Terry Roy	Rep	Rockingham	34	Mark Pearson	Rep
Rockingham	33	Josh Yokela	Rep	Rockingham	35	Julius Soti	Rep
Rockingham	34	Mark Pearson	Rep	Rockingham	36	JD Bernardy	Rep
Rockingham	35	Deborah Hobson	Rep	Rockingham	37	David Meuse	Dem
Rockingham	36	Alexis Simpson	Dem	Rockingham	38	Peggy Balboni	Dem
Rockingham	37	Max Abramson	Rep	Rockingham	39	Ned Raynolds	Dem
Rockingham	New seat			Rockingham	40	Jason Janvrin	Rep
Strafford	1	Peter Hayward	Rep	Strafford	1	James Horgan	Rep
Strafford	1	Glenn Bailey	Rep	Strafford	1	Joseph Pitre	Rep
Strafford	2	James Horgan	Rep	Strafford	2	Glenn Bailey	Rep
Strafford	2	Joseph Pitre	Rep	Strafford	2	Claudine Burnham	Rep
Strafford	3	Michael Harrington	Rep	Strafford	2	Michael Granger	Rep
Strafford	3	Kurt Wuelper	Rep	Strafford	3	David Bickford	Rep
Strafford	4	Cassandra Levesque	Dem	Strafford	4	Cassandra Levesque	Dem
Strafford	4	Len Turcotte	Rep	Strafford	4	Heath Howard	Dem
Strafford	5	Jeffrey Salloway	Dem	Strafford	4	Len Turcotte	Rep
Strafford	6	Timothy Horrigan	Dem	Strafford	5	Thomas L. Kaczynski Jr.	Rep
Strafford	6	Cam Kenney	Dem	Strafford	6	Clifford Newton	Rep
Strafford	6	Marjorie Smith	Dem	Strafford	7	Aidan Ankarberg	Rep
Strafford	6	Judith Spang	Dem	Strafford	8	Chuck Grassie	Dem
Strafford	6	Janet Wall	Dem	Strafford	9	Brandon Phinney	Rep
Strafford	7	Timothy Fontneau	Dem	Strafford	10	Timothy Horrigan	Dem
Strafford	8	Donna Ellis	Dem	Strafford	10	Cam Kenney	Dem
Strafford	9	Clifford Newton	Rep	Strafford	10	Marjorie Smith	Dem
Strafford	10	Aidan Ankarberg	Rep	Strafford	10	Loren Selig	Dem
Strafford	11	Chuck Grassie	Dem	Strafford	11	Thomas Southworth	Dem
Strafford	12	Mac Kittredge	Rep	Strafford	11	Janet Wall	Dem
Strafford	13	Casey Conley	Dem	Strafford	11	Hoy Menear	Dem
Strafford	14	Kristina Fargo	Dem	Strafford	12	Gerri Cannon	Dem
Strafford	15	Ariel Oxaal	Dem	Strafford	12	Cecilia Rich	Dem
Strafford	16	Sherry Frost	Dem	Strafford	12	Jeffrey Rich	Dem
Strafford	17	Peter Bixby	Dem	Strafford	12	Kenneth Vincent	Dem
Strafford	17	Susan Treleaven	Dem	Strafford	13	Peter Bixby	Dem
Strafford	17	Kenneth Vincent	Dem	Strafford	14	Peter B. Schmidt	Dem
Strafford	18	Gerri Cannon	Dem	Strafford	15	Bill Conlin	Dem
Strafford	18	Wendy Chase	Dem	Strafford	16	Gail Pare	Dem
Strafford	18	Cecilia Rich	Dem	Strafford	17	Jessica LaMontagne	Dem
Strafford	19	Peter B. Schmidt	Dem	Strafford	18	Michael Harrington	Rep
Strafford	20	Thomas Southworth	Dem	Strafford	19	James Connor	Rep
Strafford	21	Catt Sandler	Dem	Strafford	19	Daniel Fitzpatrick	Dem
Strafford	22	Thomas L. Kaczynski Jr.	Rep	Strafford	19	Kelley Potenza	Rep
Strafford	23	Fenton Groen	Rep	Strafford	20	Allan Howland	Dem
Strafford	24	Susan DeLemus	Rep	Strafford	21	Susan Treleaven	Dem
Strafford	25	Amanda Gourgue	Dem	Strafford	21	Luz Bay	Dem
Strafford	New seat			Strafford	21	Geoffrey Smith	Dem
Sullivan	1	Lee Oxenham	Dem	Sullivan	1	Brian Sullivan	Dem
Sullivan	1	Brian Sullivan	Dem	Sullivan	2	William Palmer	Dem
Sullivan	2	Sue Gottling	Dem	Sullivan	3	Skip Rollins	Rep
Sullivan	3	Andrew O'Hearne	Dem	Sullivan	3	Steven D. Smith	Rep
Sullivan	4	Gary Merchant	Dem	Sullivan	3	Walter Spilsbury	Rep
Sullivan	5	Walter Stapleton	Rep	Sullivan	4	Judy Aron	Rep
Sullivan	6	John Callum	Rep	Sullivan	5	Linda Tanner	Dem
Sullivan	6	Skip Rollins	Rep	Sullivan	6	John Cloutier	Dem
Sullivan	7	Judy Aron	Rep	Sullivan	6	Gary Merchant	Dem
Sullivan	8	Walter Spilsbury	Rep	Sullivan	6	Walter Stapleton	Rep
Sullivan	9	Linda Tanner	Dem	Sullivan	7	Margaret Drye	Rep
Sullivan	10	John Cloutier	Dem	Sullivan	8	Hope Damon	Dem
Sullivan	11	Steven D. Smith	Rep	Sullivan	8	Jonathan Stone	Rep

== Retiring incumbents ==
94 incumbent Representatives (58 Democrats, 35 Republicans and one independent) did not seek reelection in 2022:

- Note: Districts shown are pre-redistricting
1. Belknap 2: Jonathan Mackie (R)
2. Belknap 2: Timothy Lang Sr. (R) (running for State Senate)
3. Carroll 8: William Marsh (D) (running for State Senate)
4. Cheshire 2: John Mann (D)
5. Cheshire 4: Lawrence Welkowitz (D)
6. Cheshire 7: Sparky Von Plinsky (D)
7. Cheshire 8: Donovan Fenton (D) (running for State Senate)
8. Cheshire 9: Andrew Maneval (D)
9. Cheshire 12: Jennie Gomarlo (D)
10. Cheshire 13: Ben Kilanski (R)
11. Cheshire 16: William Pearson (D)
12. Coös 1: Dennis Thompson (D)
13. Coös 3: Larry Laflamme (D)
14. Coös 3: Robert Theberge (R) (running for County Commissioner)
15. Coös 4: Kevin Craig (R)
16. Coös 5: Edith Tucker (D) (running for State Senate)
17. Grafton 1: Joseph DePalma (R)
18. Grafton 8: Suzanne Smith (D)
19. Grafton 8: Joyce Weston (D)
20. Grafton 9: Ned Gordon (R)
21. Grafton 10: Roger Dontonville (D)
22. Grafton 11: Beth Folsom (R)
23. Grafton 12: Richard Abel (D)
24. Grafton 15: David Binford (R)
25. Hillsborough 1: Marjorie Porter (D)
26. Hillsborough 7: Barbara Griffin (R) (running for State Senate)
27. Hillsborough 7: John Graham (R)
28. Hillsborough 7: Sue Mullen (D)
29. Hillsborough 7: Niki Kelsey (R)
30. Hillsborough 9: Iz Piedra (D)
31. Hillsborough 11: Nicole Klein-Knight (D)
32. Hillsborough 15: Erika Connors (D)
33. Hillsborough 17: Timothy Smith (D)
34. Hillsborough 18: Willis Griffith (D)
35. Hillsborough 19: Kendall Snow (D)
36. Hillsborough 25: Paul Somero (R)
37. Hillsborough 28: Bruce Cohen (D)
38. Hillsborough 28: Janice Schmidt (D)
39. Hillsborough 29: Paul Bergeron (D)
40. Hillsborough 30: Patricia Klee (D)
41. Hillsborough 31: Manny Espitia (D)
42. Hillsborough 32: Dan Toomey (D)
43. Hillsborough 33: Mark King (D)
44. Hillsborough 34: Melbourne Moran (D)
45. Hillsborough 34: Deb Stevens (D)
46. Hillsborough 37: Andrew Renzullo (R)
47. Hillsborough 37: Kim Rice (R)
48. Hillsborough 37: Denise Smith (R)
49. Hillsborough 39: John Burt (R)
50. Hillsborough 45: Connie Van Houten (D)
51. Merrimack 6: Rod Pimentel (D)
52. Merrimack 8: Caroletta Alicea (D)
53. Merrimack 17: Safiya Wazir (D)
54. Merrimack 19: Christy Bartlett (D)
55. Merrimack 23: Samantha Fox (D)
56. Merrimack 23: Mary Beth Walz (D)
57. Merrimack 23: Gary Woods (D)
58. Merrimack 24: Michael Yakubovich (R) (running for State Senate)
59. Merrimack 26: Howard Pearl (R) (running for State Senate)
60. Rockingham 2: Alan Bershtein (R)
61. Rockingham 3: Paul Ayer (R)
62. Rockingham 3: Dustin Dodge (R)
63. Rockingham 5: Al Baldasaro (R)
64. Rockingham 5: Betsy McKinney (R)
65. Rockingham 6: Mary Ann Kimball (R)
66. Rockingham 8: Daryl Abbas (R) (running for State Senate)
67. Rockingham 8: Robert Elliott (R)
68. Rockingham 8: Everett McBride (R)
69. Rockingham 9: Sean Morrison (R)
70. Rockingham 13: David Welch (R)
71. Rockingham 14: Norman Major (R)
72. Rockingham 14: Peter Torosian (R) (running for State Senate)
73. Rockingham 17: Ellen Read (I)
74. Rockingham 19: Debra Altschiller (D) (running for State Senate)
75. Rockingham 21: Tom Loughman (D)
76. Rockingham 25: Laura Pantelakos (D)
77. Rockingham 27: Peter Somssich (D)
78. Strafford 1: Peter Hayward (R)
79. Strafford 5: Jeffrey Salloway (D)
80. Strafford 6: Judith Spang (D)
81. Strafford 7: Timothy Fontneau (D)
82. Strafford 8: Donna Ellis (D)
83. Strafford 13: Casey Conley (D)
84. Strafford 14: Kristina Fargo (D)
85. Strafford 15: Ariel Oxaal (D)
86. Strafford 16: Sherry Frost (D)
87. Strafford 18: Wendy Chase (D)
88. Strafford 21: Catt Sandler (D)
89. Strafford 24: Susan DeLemus (R) (running for County Commissioner)
90. Strafford 25: Amanda Gourgue (D)
91. Sullivan 1: Lee Oxenham (D)
92. Sullivan 2: Sue Gottling (D)
93. Sullivan 6: John Callum (R)

== Defeated incumbents ==
=== In the primary ===
1. Belknap 4: Mike Sylvia (R)
2. Belknap 6: Glen Aldrich (R)
3. Belknap 6: Gregg Hough (R)
4. Belknap 6: Norm Silber (R)
5. Carroll 6: Brodie Deshaies (R)
6. Cheshire 7: John Bordenet (D)
7. Cheshire 15: Paul Berch (D)

=== In the general election ===
1. Belknap 5: Dawn Johnson (R)
2. Belknap 5: Richard Littlefield (R)
3. Carroll 1: Karen Umberger (R)
4. Carroll 8: Jerry Knirk (D)
5. Grafton 1: Timothy Egan (D)
6. Grafton 3: Bonnie Ham (R)
7. Grafton 7: Mark Alliegro (R)

== See also ==
- List of New Hampshire General Courts
