= Peter Torosian =

American politician

Peter E. Torosian

Member of the New Hampshire House of Representatives from the 14th Rockingham district
- In office December 7, 2016 – December 7, 2022 Serving with Norman Major, Debra L. DeSimone, William G. Friel, Robert D. Harb
- Preceded by: Shem Kellogg
- Succeeded by: Kenneth Weyler; Deborah L. Hobson

Personal details
- Party: Republican
- Children: 2
- Education: Northeastern University (BS)

Peter E. Torosian is an American politician from the state of New Hampshire. A Republican, Torosian has represented the 14th Rockingham district in the New Hampshire House of Representatives since 2016. In the State House, he represents the towns of Atkinson and Plaistow.

He has a BS in Business Administration from Northeastern University. He has been married to his wife for 39 years. He has two sons and two granddaughters.

In 2022, Representative Torosian sponsored a bill for New Hampshire to secede from the union and to create a "sovereign nation." He also sponsored a bill to dissolve all cooperative and regional school districts.

As of 2022, Torosian is running for the New Hampshire Senate in the 22nd district. He is seeking to replace Chuck Morse who is running for the United States Senate. He lost the primary to Daryl Abbas.

New Hampshire House of Representatives
Preceded by Shem Kellogg	Member of the New Hampshire House of Representatives from the 14th Rockingham district 2016–2022; Served alongside: Norman Major, Debra L. DeSimone, William G. Friel, Robert D. Harb	Succeeded by Kenneth Weyler; Deborah L. Hobson
