= Tracy Emerick =

American politician

Member of the New Hampshire House of Representatives from the Rockingham 29th district
- In office December 7, 2022 – December 4, 2024
- Preceded by: David Meuse
- Succeeded by: Nicholas Bridle; Erica de Vries

Member of the New Hampshire House of Representatives from the Rockingham 21st district
- In office December 2, 2020 – December 7, 2022
- Preceded by: Patricia J. Bushway
- Succeeded by: Robin Vogt
- In office December 5, 2012 – December 5, 2018
- Preceded by: District created
- Succeeded by: Tom Loughman; Patricia J. Bushway

Personal details
- Party: Republican
- Education: College of William and Mary (BS); Northeastern University (MBA); California Coast University (PhD)

Tracy Emerick is an American politician. He serves as a Republican member for the Rockingham 29th district of the New Hampshire House of Representatives. He currently is the chair of the Finance Division II Committee.

== Personal life ==
Emerick resides in Hampton, New Hampshire. Emerick is married and has two children and five grandchildren. Emerick graduated from Ayer Senior High School in 1965. Emerick earned a B.S. in philosophy from the College of William and Mary in 1969, an M.B.A. from Northeastern University in 1974, and a Ph.D. in business administration from California Coast University.

== Political career ==
Emerick serves as a Republican member for the Rockingham 29th district of the New Hampshire House of Representatives, having previously served for Rockingham's 29th district since 2012 before the 2020 redistricting. He currently is the chair of the Finance Division II Committee.

Emerick currently serves as a member of the Town of Hampton Planning Board.
