= Linda Massimilla =

American politician

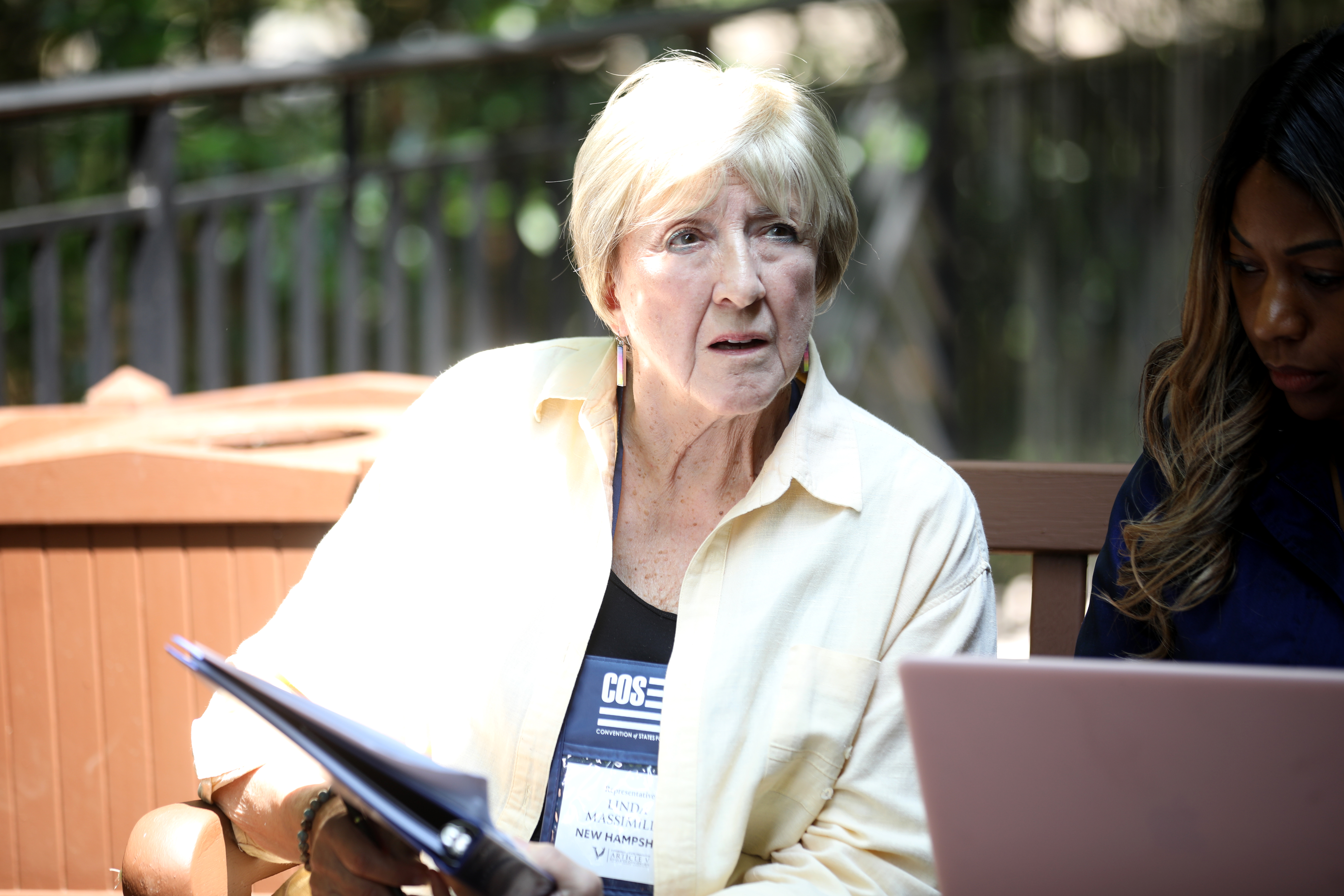

Member of the New Hampshire House of Representatives from the Grafton 1st district
- In office December 5, 2012 – December 4, 2024 Serving with Ralph Doolan, Jr.(2012–2014), Erin Hennessey (2014–2020), Joseph DePalma (2020–2022), David Rochefort (2022–2024), Matthew Simon (2022–2024)
- Preceded by: Rusty Bulis; Stephanie Eaton
- Succeeded by: Joseph Barton; Darrell Louis; Calvin Beaulier

Personal details
- Party: Democratic

Linda Massimilla is an American politician. She served as a Democratic member for the Grafton 1st district of the New Hampshire House of Representatives. She lost reelection in 2024.
