= Brouillard =

Brouillard is a French surname. Notable people with the surname include:

- André Léon Brouillard (1900–1985), French writer, spy and resistance member
- Jacob Brouillard, American politician
- Joseph Ovide Brouillard (1859–1940), Canadian politician
- Lou Brouillard (1911–1984), Canadian boxer
- Louis Brouillard (1921–2018), American Catholic priest
- Chad P. Brouillard (1975–Present), American Lawyer, Medical Malpractice Defense Trial Attorney, former President of Massachusetts Society for Healthcare Risk Management (MSHRM).

== See also ==
- Brouillards, piano piece by Claude Debussy
- Mont Brouillard, mountain in Italy
