= Douglas Thomas =

Douglas Thomas may refer to:

- Douglas Thomas (academic) (born 1966), American scholar, researcher, and journalist
- Douglas Thomas (Maine politician), member of the Maine Senate
- Douglas Thomas (New Hampshire politician), member of the New Hampshire House of Representatives
- Doug Thomas (basketball) (born 1983), American basketball player
- Doug Thomas (American football) (1969–2014), American football player and sprinter
