= Arnold Davis =

Arnold Davis may refer to:

- Arnold Davis (American football)
- Arnold Davis (politician)
