= Zachary Nutting =

American politician

Member of the New Hampshire House of Representatives from the Cheshire 11th district
- In office December 7, 2022 – September 11, 2024

Personal details
- Party: Republican

Zachary Nutting is an American politician. He served as a Republican member for the Cheshire 11th district of the New Hampshire House of Representatives.

== Life and career ==
Nutting was a service manager.

In September 2022, Nutting defeated Max Santonastaso in the Republican primary election for the Cheshire 11th district of the New Hampshire House of Representatives. In November 2022, he defeated Natalie Quevedo in the general election, winning 53 percent of the votes. He assumed office in December 2022. He resigned in September 2024.
