= Lucy Weber =

American politician

Speaker pro tempore of the New Hampshire House of Representatives
- In office December 5, 2018 – December 2, 2020
- Leader: Steve Shurtleff
- Preceded by: Barbara Griffin
- Succeeded by: Kimberly Rice

Member of the New Hampshire House of Representatives from the Cheshire 1st district
- Incumbent
- Assumed office December 2006

Personal details
- Born: August 5, 1952 (age 73) New York City, New York, U.S
- Party: Democratic
- Education: Tufts University (BA); Vermont Law School (MA, JD)

Lucy McVitty Weber (born August 5, 1952) is a Democratic member of the New Hampshire House of Representatives, representing the Cheshire 1st District since 2006.

Weber went to the Vermont Law School and practices law in Vermont.

New Hampshire House of Representatives
Preceded by Barbara Griffin	Speaker pro tempore of the New Hampshire House of Representatives; 2018–2020	Succeeded by Kimberly Rice
