= Nicholas Bridle =

American politician

Representative Nicholas D. Bridle
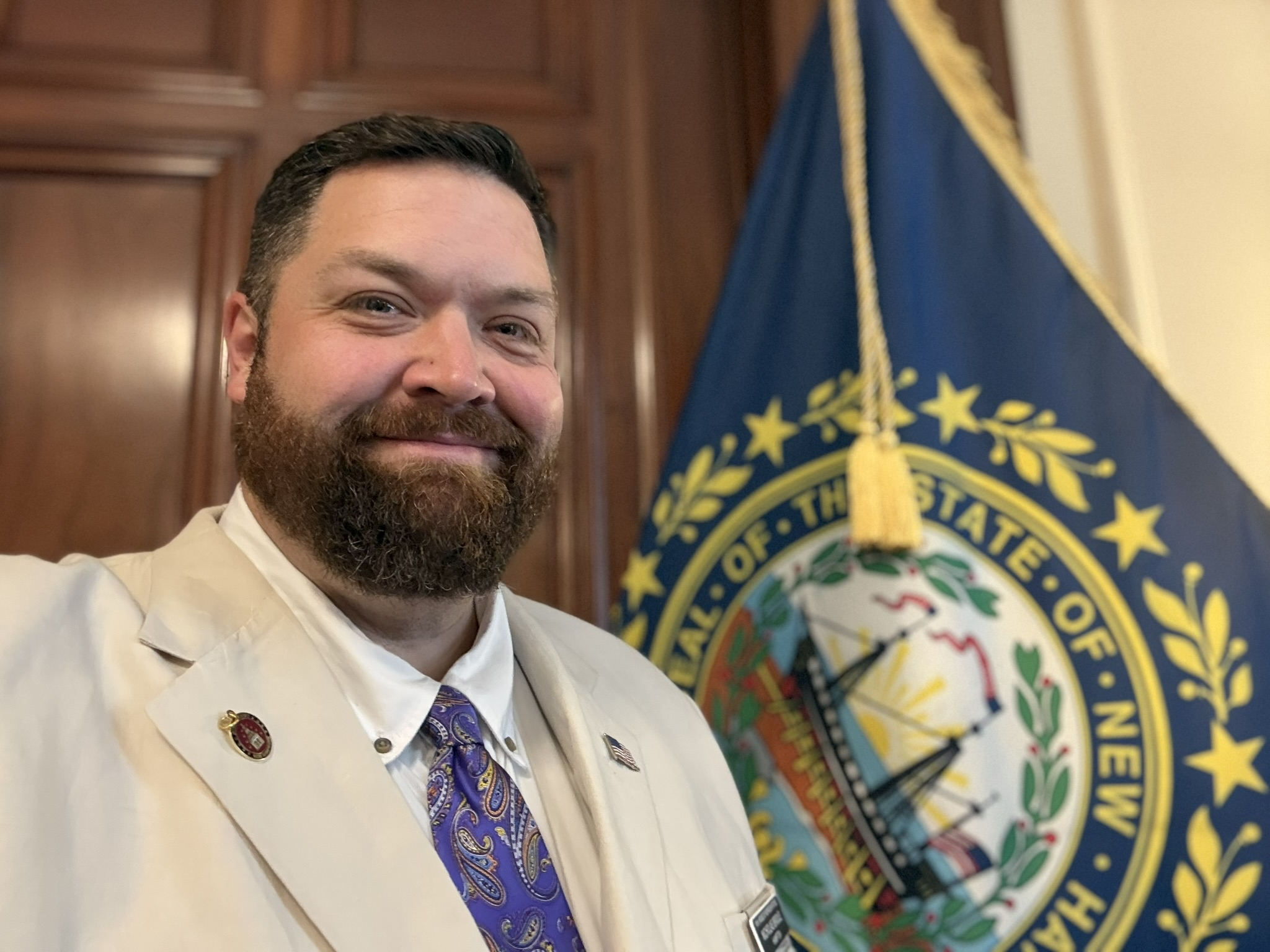

Member of New Hampshire House of Representatives for Rockingham County's 29th district
- Incumbent
- Assumed office December 4, 2024

Personal details
- Born: November 7, 1983 (age 42) Exeter, New Hampshire
- Party: Republican
- Education: ECPI University
- Website: www.bridleforNH.com

Nicholas D. Bridle (born November 7, 1983) is an American politician serving as a member of the New Hampshire House of Representatives. from the Rockingham 29 district. He was first elected in 2024 and assumed office on December 4, 2024. Bridle is a member of the Republican Party and represents the town of Hampton.

== Early life and education ==
Bridle was born in Exeter, New Hampshire, and raised in the Seacoast region. Bridle grew up in Hampton Beach. He attended Winnacunnet High School, graduating in 2002 and later earned a Bachelor of Science degree in criminal justice from ECPI University in Raleigh, North Carolina. During his undergraduate studies, he completed internships with Wake County Probation and the Wake County Clerk of Courts.

== Career ==
=== Public safety and early work ===
Before entering elected office, Bridle worked in public safety. He has served as a fire and emergency medical services dispatcher since September 2016, working in communications for multiple communities in southern New Hampshire. Bridle began his public service career in 2012 as a probation/parole officer in Wake County, North Carolina.

Bridle has held leadership roles including past president of the New Hampshire Emergency Dispatchers Association and founder of the Derry Fire Fighters Charitable Organization.

Bridle is also involved locally as an event director for community events such as the Hampton Beach Seafood Festival and the Annual Hampton Holiday Parade.

=== Civic involvement ===
Bridle has been active in community organizations including serving on the Hampton Municipal Budget Committee beginning in 2015. He has also served in leadership and promotional roles with Experience Hampton, Inc., a nonprofit focused on community events and economic development in Hampton.

== New Hampshire House of Representatives ==
Bridle was elected to the New Hampshire House of Representatives in the 2024 general election to represent Rockingham District 29. He assumed office on December 4, 2024. Official records list him as a member of the Resources, Recreation and Development Committee.

=== Legislative work ===
In the 2025–2026 legislative term, Bridle sponsored and co-sponsored bills related to coastal resilience, state-park operations, veterans’ access, energy infrastructure, and outdoor recreation. Notable legislation includes:

==== 2025 Session (First Year of Term) ====
- HB607 relative to funding the Hampton Beach area commission and making appropriations therefor. (Co-Sponsor)
- SB181 relative to workers' compensation for firefighters with cancer. (Co-Sponsor)

==== 2026 Session (Second Year of Term) ====
- LSR 2026-2926 relative to free day-use admission and metered parking at state parks for all honorably discharged state resident veterans. (Prime Sponsor)
- LSR 2026-2928 relative to a start park public safety parking surcharge. (Prime Sponsor)
- LSR 2026-2886 creating a special license for non-resident vessel operators participating in tuna tournaments. (Prime Sponsor)
- HB1594 establishing a weight-based tiered registration fee schedule for electric and plug-in hybrid vehicles. (Prime Sponsor)
- HR23 affirming the importance of digital literacy and access for older Americans. (Co-Sponsor)
- SB403 requiring all schools to start the school year after Labor Day. (Co-Sponsor)
- HB1095 increasing the maximum weight of a utility terrain vehicle to 3,000 pounds, (Co-Sponsor)
- HB1482 authorizing the department of motor vehicles to adopt seasonal tourism-themed license plates. (Co-Sponsor)
- HB1273 enabling municipal support and incentives for residential flood resilience improvements.(Co-Sponsor)
- HB1285 establishing an interagency task force to determine if New Hampshire may implement an R-PACER program. (Co-Sponsor)
- HB1577 relative to the disclosure of utility customer data to municipalities for emergency response planning. (Co-Sponsor)
- HB1330 allowing all registered voters to vote in state and presidential primaries regardless of declared party affiliation.(Co-Sponsor)
- HB1320 establishing a study committee to analyze past, present, and potential funding sources for the New Hampshire state council on the arts. (Co-Sponsor)

In April 2026, Bridle was among a group of Republican state representatives who signed a letter calling for the reprimand of Rep. Travis Corcoran (R-Weare) over controversial social media posts directed at colleagues. The letter, penned by Rep. Bill Boyd (R-Merrimack) also signed by Reps. Mike Bordes (R-Laconia) and Rep. Matthew Coker (R-Meredith), was read into the record at a House Legislative Administration Committee hearing. The signatories stated that a reprimand was "a necessary step to ensure our focus remains on governing."

== Personal life ==
Bridle resides in Hampton, New Hampshire, with his wife and daughter. He is an avid golfer.
