= John Mann (New Hampshire politician) =

American politician

Member of the New Hampshire House of Representatives from the Cheshire 2nd district
- In office December 5, 2012 – December 7, 2022
- Preceded by: Anne Cartwright
- Succeeded by: Dru Fox

Personal details
- Party: Democratic
- Education: Brookline High School; Harvard College

Military service
- Branch/service: United States Navy
- Years of service: 1961-1965
- Rank: Lieutenant

John E. Mann is an American politician in New Hampshire.

== Education and early career ==
Mann graduated from Brookline High School. Mann earned a A.B. from Harvard College in 1961. Mann served in the United States Navy from 1961 to 1965. He later worked in the technology industry, taught high school mathematics, and earned at Master of Arts in Teaching at Harvard.

== Political career ==
On November 6, 2012, Mann was elected to the New Hampshire House of Representatives, representing the Cheshire 2 district. He assumed office on December 5, 2012. Mann is a Democrat.

== Personal life ==
Mann resides in Alstead, New Hampshire. He is married and has three children.
