= Mary Beth Walz =

American politician

Member of the New Hampshire House of Representatives
- In office 2016 – December 7, 2022
- Constituency: Merrimack 23

Member of the New Hampshire House of Representatives
- In office 2012–2014
- Constituency: Merrimack 23

Member of the New Hampshire House of Representatives
- In office 2004–2010
- Constituency: Merrimack 13

Personal details
- Party: Democratic

Mary Beth Walz is an American politician from New Hampshire. She served in the New Hampshire House of Representatives.

In 2022, she was awarded the Jack Lightfoot Voice for Children Award alongside Pat Long and Kim Rice.
