= Judith Spang =

American politician from New Hampshire (born 1946)

Member of the New Hampshire House of Representatives from the Strafford 6th district
- In office 1998 – December 7, 2022

Personal details
- Born: April 24, 1946 (age 80) Providence, Rhode Island
- Party: Democratic
- Education: Bryn Mawr College; University of New Hampshire
- Occupation: Land Use Planner, Corporate Strategic Planner

Judith Spang (born April 24, 1946) is an American politician in the state of New Hampshire. She was a member of the New Hampshire House of Representatives, sitting as a Democrat from the Strafford 6 district, having been first elected in 1998. She left office in 2022.

After traveling to Italy during the coronavirus outbreak, she went to the State House to work with her committee and was told not to return to the complex for two weeks and to observe U.S. Center for Disease Control guidelines to self-quarantine.
