= Dawn Johnson (politician) =

American politician

Member of the New Hampshire House of Representatives
- In office December 2, 2020 – December 7, 2022
- Succeeded by: Juliet Harvey-Bolia
- Constituency: Belknap 3

Personal details
- Party: Republican

Dawn M. Johnson is an American politician from New Hampshire. She served in the New Hampshire House of Representatives.
