= Robin Vogt =

American politician

Member of the New Hampshire House of Representatives from the Rockingham 21st district
- In office December 7, 2022 – December 1, 2023

Personal details
- Party: Democratic
- Education: Granite State College

Robin Warren Vogt is an American politician. He served as a Democratic member for the Rockingham 21st district of the New Hampshire House of Representatives from 2022 to 2023.

== Life and career ==
Vogt attended Granite State College.

In September 2022, Vogt defeated Jacqueline Cali-Pitts in the Democratic primary election for the Rockingham 21st district of the New Hampshire House of Representatives. No candidate was nominated to challenge him in the general election. He assumed office in December 2022.

In the 2024 presidential election, Vogt endorsed author Marianne Williamson's presidential bid and served as her campaign's national volunteer coordinator.

Vogt resigned from his position as State Representative on December 1, 2023, before moving out of Rockingham District 21 to Durham, NH. Vogt ran for Durham Town Council in the March 2025 elections, returning to local politics.
