= Aidan Ankarberg =

American politician

Member of the New Hampshire House of Representatives from the Strafford 10th district
- In office 2020 – December 7, 2022

Member of the New Hampshire House of Representatives from the Strafford 7th district
- Incumbent
- Assumed office December 7, 2022

Personal details
- Party: Republican (until 2024); Independent (2024–present)

Aidan Ankarberg is an American politician. He serves as a member for the Strafford 7th district of the New Hampshire House of Representatives.
