= Casey Conley =

American politician

Member of the New Hampshire House of Representatives
- In office November 8, 2017 – December 7, 2022
- Succeeded by: Peter Bixby
- Constituency: Strafford 13

Personal details
- Party: Democratic

Casey M. Conley is an American politician from New Hampshire. He served in the New Hampshire House of Representatives.

He introduced legislation on childcare.
