= Thomas Southworth =

American politician

Member of the New Hampshire House of Representatives from the Strafford 20th district
- In office 2014 – December 7, 2022

Member of the New Hampshire House of Representatives from the Strafford 11th district
- Incumbent
- Assumed office December 7, 2022

Personal details
- Party: Democratic

Thomas Southworth is an American politician. He serves as a Democratic member for the Strafford 11th district of the New Hampshire House of Representatives.
