= Richard Littlefield =

American politician

Member of the New Hampshire House of Representatives from the Belknap 3rd district
- In office December 2, 2020 – December 7, 2022

Personal details
- Party: Republican

Richard Littlefield is an American politician. He served as a Republican member for the Belknap 3rd district of the New Hampshire House of Representatives.

== Life and career ==
Littlefield attended Laconia High School.

Littlefield served in the New Hampshire House of Representatives from 2020 to 2022.
