= Mark Pearson (American politician) =

American politician (born 1949)

State Representative

Member of the New Hampshire House of Representatives

Personal details
- Born: June 5, 1949 (age 77) Leominster, Massachusetts, U.S.
- Party: Republican
- Education: Williams College (BA); Oxford University (MA); Boston University (DMin)

Mark Pearson is an American politician. He serves as a Republican member for the Rockingham 34th district of the New Hampshire House of Representatives.

== Early life and education ==
Pearson completed his undergraduate degree at Williams College, during which he also spent a year abroad at Durham University (1969–70). He earned his Master of Arts degree from the University of Oxford and Doctor of Ministry from Boston University.

== Personal life ==
Pearson resides in Hampstead, New Hampshire.

== Political career ==
Pearson serves as the Chairman of the Children and Family Law Committee. In 2023, Pearson supported Ron DeSantis' campaign to be re-elected as the Governor of Florida.
