= Clifford Newton =

American politician

Member of the New Hampshire House of Representatives from the Strafford 67th district
- In office 2002–2004

Member of the New Hampshire House of Representatives from the Strafford 1st district
- In office 2004–2006
- In office 2010–2012

Member of the New Hampshire House of Representatives from the Strafford 9th district
- In office 2020 – December 7, 2022

Member of the New Hampshire House of Representatives from the Strafford 6th district
- Incumbent
- Assumed office December 7, 2022

Personal details
- Party: Republican

Clifford Newton is an American politician. He serves as a Republican member for the Strafford 6th district of the New Hampshire House of Representatives.
