= Renee Monteil =

American politician

Member of the New Hampshire House of Representatives from the Cheshire 15th district
- In office December 7, 2022 – December 4, 2024

Personal details
- Party: Democratic

Renee Monteil is an American politician. She served as a Democratic member for the Cheshire 15th district of the New Hampshire House of Representatives from 2022 to 2024.
