= Leah Cushman =

American politician from New Hampshire

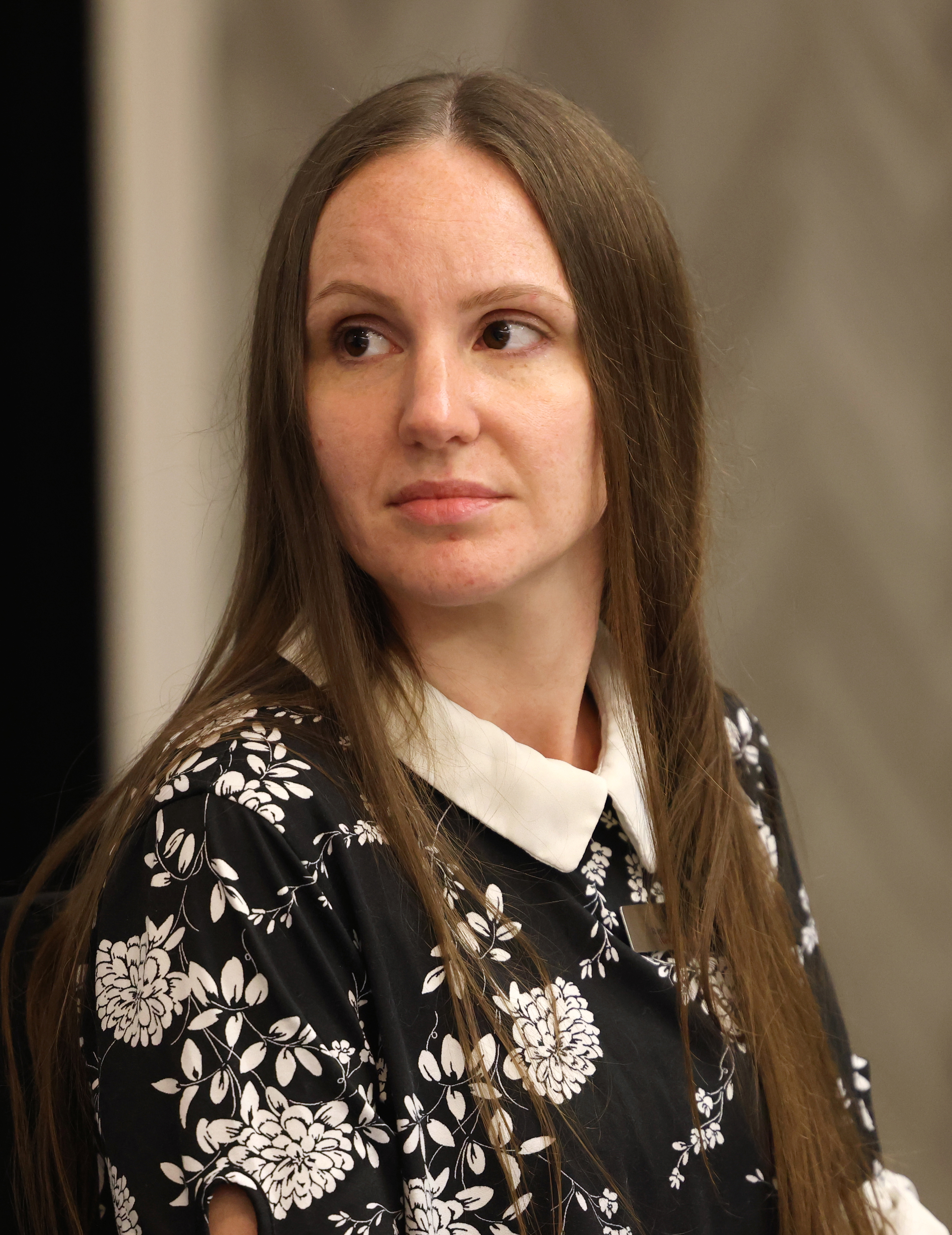
- Cushman in 2024

Member of the New Hampshire House of Representatives from the Hillsborough 2nd district

Personal details
- Party: Republican

Leah Cushman is an American politician from New Hampshire. She was a member of the New Hampshire House of Representatives from 2022-2024, as a member of the New Hampshire Republican Party. She represented District 2. Cushman was a member of the Health, Human Services and Elderly Affairs Committee.

== Biography ==
In 2014, Cushman earned an associate's degree from Middlesex Community College. She later earned a B.S. in nursing from the University of Massachusetts. Cushman is a registered nurse. In 2017, Cushman and her family moved from Massachusetts to Weare, New Hampshire.

== Political positions ==
=== Vaccination ===
Cushman opposes COVID-19 vaccine mandates for religious reasons.

=== Ivermectin ===
In 2021, Cushman sponsored a bill that would have allowed over-the-counter sale of ivermectin.
