= Joseph DePalma =

American politician

Member of New Hampshire House of Representatives for Grafton 1
- In office December 2, 2020 – December 7, 2022
- Preceded by: Erin Hennessey
- Succeeded by: David Rochefort

Personal details
- Party: Republican

Joseph DePalma IV is an American politician. He was a member of the New Hampshire House of Representatives and represented Grafton's 1st district.
