= James Mason (New Hampshire politician) =

American politician

Member of the New Hampshire House of Representatives from the Merrimack 2nd district
- In office 2020 – December 7, 2022

Member of the New Hampshire House of Representatives from the Merrimack 3rd district
- Incumbent
- Assumed office December 7, 2022

Personal details
- Party: Republican

James Mason is an American politician. He serves as a Republican member for the Merrimack 3rd district of the New Hampshire House of Representatives.
