= Andrew Maneval =

American politician

Member of New Hampshire House of Representatives for Cheshire 9
- In office November 10, 2021 – December 7, 2022

Personal details
- Party: Democratic

Andrew Maneval is an American politician. He was a member of the New Hampshire House of Representatives and represented Cheshire 9th district.
