= David Binford =

American politician

Member of New Hampshire House of Representatives for Grafton 15
- In office December 2, 2020 – December 7, 2022

Personal details
- Party: Republican

David W. Binford is an American politician. He was a member of the New Hampshire House of Representatives and represented Grafton's 15th district.
