= Ellen Read =

American politician

Member of the New Hampshire House of Representatives from the Rockingham 10 district
- Incumbent
- Assumed office December 2016

Personal details
- Party: Democratic (2016-2021) (2022-Present)
- Other political affiliations: Independent (2021-2022)
- Education: University of New Hampshire (MA) Vanderbilt University (BS)
- Website: https://www.ellen4nh.com/

Ellen Read is a New Hampshire politician. She is a Democratic member of the New Hampshire House of Representatives.

== Career ==
On November 8, 2016, Read was elected to the New Hampshire House of Representatives where she represents the Rockingham 17 district. Read is a Democrat. Read serves on the Fish and Game and Marine Resources Committee. Read endorsed Bernie Sanders in the 2020 Democratic Party presidential primaries. She is the founder of the New Hampshire Progressive Caucus. She has served on the Special Committee on Housing since its formation in 2022.

In 2021, Read left the Democratic party to sit as an independent. She cited issues with Democratic Party leadership, specifically with alleged corruption by Representative Cathryn Harvey. She caucused with fellow independent Tony Labranche for the remainder of the term. In 2022, Read re-joined the Democratic Party and won another term as State Representative. She was re-elected again in 2024.

== Personal life ==
Read grew up the eldest of five in south Memphis, Tennessee. Read holds a master’s degree in liberal studies – environmental and socioeconomic ethics and policy from the UNH (2011), as well as a BS in molecular and cellular biology from Vanderbilt University (2003), with a double minor in religious studies and Japanese. She has worked as a high school teacher in Japan (2003-2006) as well as an adjunct professor of American government at Great Bay Community College. Read has resided in Newmarket, New Hampshire, since 2009.

== Political positions ==
Read is considered a progressive representative.

Read is a leading advocate for ranked choice voting. Read has repeatedly introduced bills to implement ranked choice voting in New Hampshire.
