= Andrew Renzullo =

American politician (born 1944)

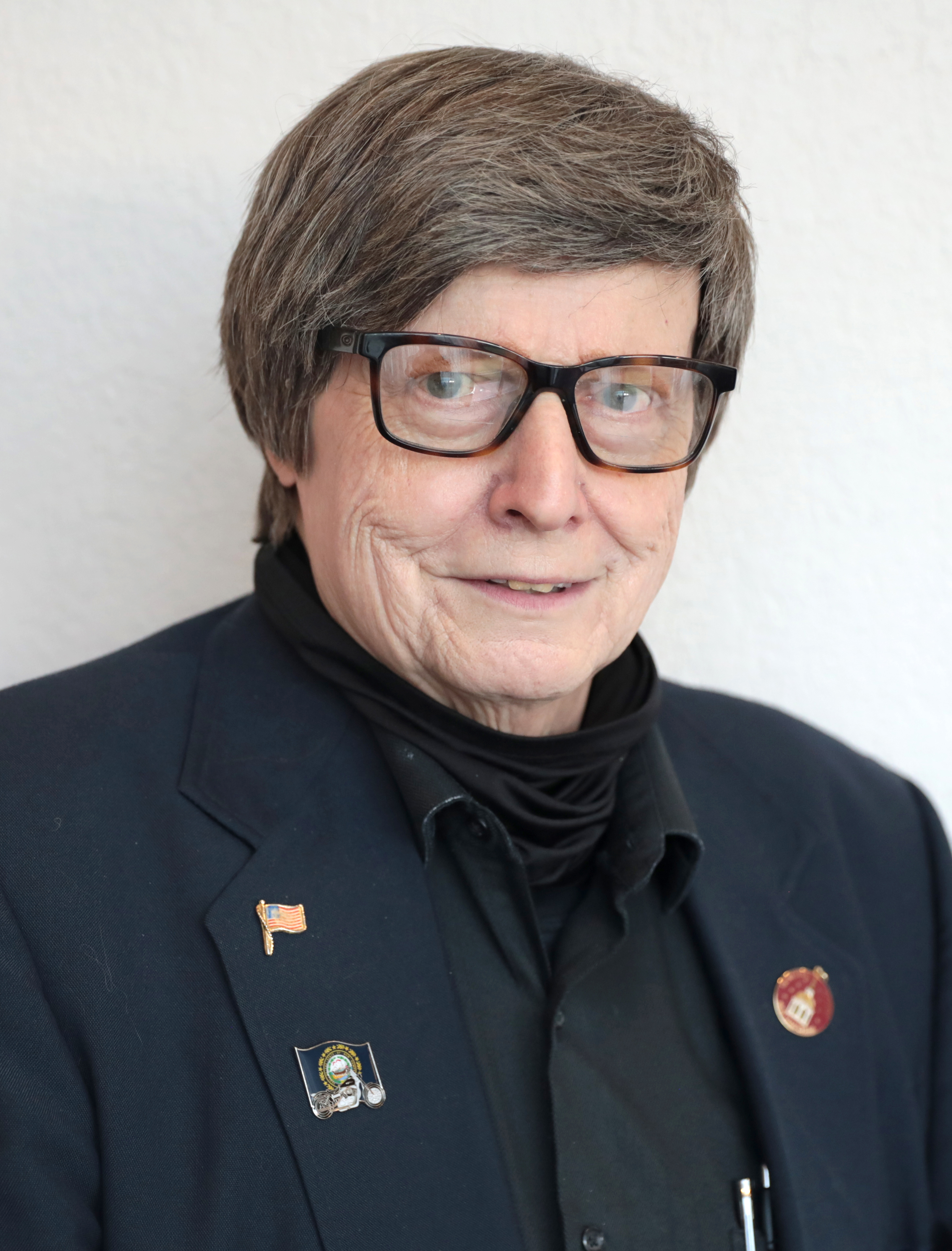
- Renzullo at the 2022 Hazlitt Summit hosted by Young Americans for Liberty Foundation

Member of the New Hampshire House of Representatives from the Hillsborough 37th district
- Incumbent
- Assumed office December 2016
- In office 2004 – December 2014

Personal details
- Born: October 25, 1944 (age 81)
- Party: Republican

Andrew Renzullo (born October 25, 1944) is an American politician in the state of New Hampshire. He is a member of the New Hampshire House of Representatives, sitting as a Republican from the Hillsborough 37 district, having been first elected in 2016, and previously serving from 2004 to 2014.
