= Timothy Horrigan =

New Hampshire politician

Tim Horrigan

Member of the New Hampshire House of Representatives

Member of the New Hampshire House of Representatives Strafford 6th
- Incumbent
- Assumed office December 2010
- In office December 2008 – December 2010
- Constituency: Strafford 7th

Personal details
- Born: October 3, 1956 (age 69) South Bend, Indiana, U.S.
- Party: Democratic
- Education: Columbia University (BA, MA); University of Southern California (MBA)

Timothy Horrigan (born October 3, 1956) is a New Hampshire politician.

== Education ==
Horrigan graduated from Northfield Mount Hermon School in 1975. He earned his B.A. in English from Columbia University in 1979, a M.A. in English and Comparative Literature from Columbia in 1982, and his MBA in Marketing Management from the University of Southern California in 1984.

== Electoral history ==
Horrigan ran for election to the New Hampshire House of Representatives to represent the Strafford 7 district in 2008 and won the election. He resigned in 2010 over his remarks on Facebook against Sarah Palin. He later ran and won the election in 2010 to represent Strafford 6 and has served in the position since.

== Personal life ==
Horrigan was born in South Bend, Indiana. His father was an accounting and finance professor at the University of New Hampshire and served as a state representative during the 1980s.
