= Mark Paige =

American politician

Member of the New Hampshire House of Representatives from the Rockingham 11th district
- Incumbent
- Assumed office December 7, 2022

Member of the New Hampshire House of Representatives from the Rockingham 18th district
- In office December 2, 2020 – December 7, 2022

Personal details
- Party: Democratic

Mark Paige is an American politician. He serves as a Democratic member for the Rockingham 11th district of the New Hampshire House of Representatives.
