= Suzanne Smith (politician) =

American politician (1948–2024)

Member of the New Hampshire House of Representatives
- In office 2008–2022

Personal details
- Born: 19 July 1948 Green Bay, Wisconsin
- Died: 6 January 2024 (aged 75) New Hampshire
- Party: Democratic

Suzanne Jane Smith (July 19, 1948 – January 6, 2024) was an American politician from New Hampshire. A Democrat, she served in the New Hampshire House of Representatives from 2008 to 2022 representing Plymouth, Holderness and Hebron. In 2020, she endorsed the Elizabeth Warren 2020 presidential campaign.

Smith was strongly committed to environmental causes and sponsored many bills to protect the state's natural resources.

Smith was born in Green Bay, Wisconsin. She owned a natural food market for 20 years.
