= Jean Jeudy =

American politician

Jean Leniol Jeudy (born 1958) is a member of the New Hampshire House of Representatives, representing Hillsborough 10, which includes Ward 3 in Manchester, New Hampshire.

== Early life ==
Jeudy was born in Jérémie, Haiti, in 1958. In 1981, he went on vacation to the United States. He admired the political freedom of that country so much that he emigrated two years later, moving to New Hampshire. He gained his American citizenship in 1995.

== Entry Into Politics ==
After a debilitating back injury in 1993, Jeudy became inspired to give back to his adopted community. He created the Manchester Haitian Community Center and served on the Board of Directors for the local United Way, as well as for the Manchester Public-access television station.

In 2004, he decided to run for State Representative and finished 5th in the Democratic Primary, 53 votes short of Manchester Firefighters Union president William Clayton. However, after the resignation of Clayton in 2005, Jeudy ran again, defeating Republican opponent, Robert Fremeau, 508 to 322. Jeudy become the first Haitian-American legislator in New Hampshire history.
