= Michael Harrington (New Hampshire politician) =

American politician (born 1953)

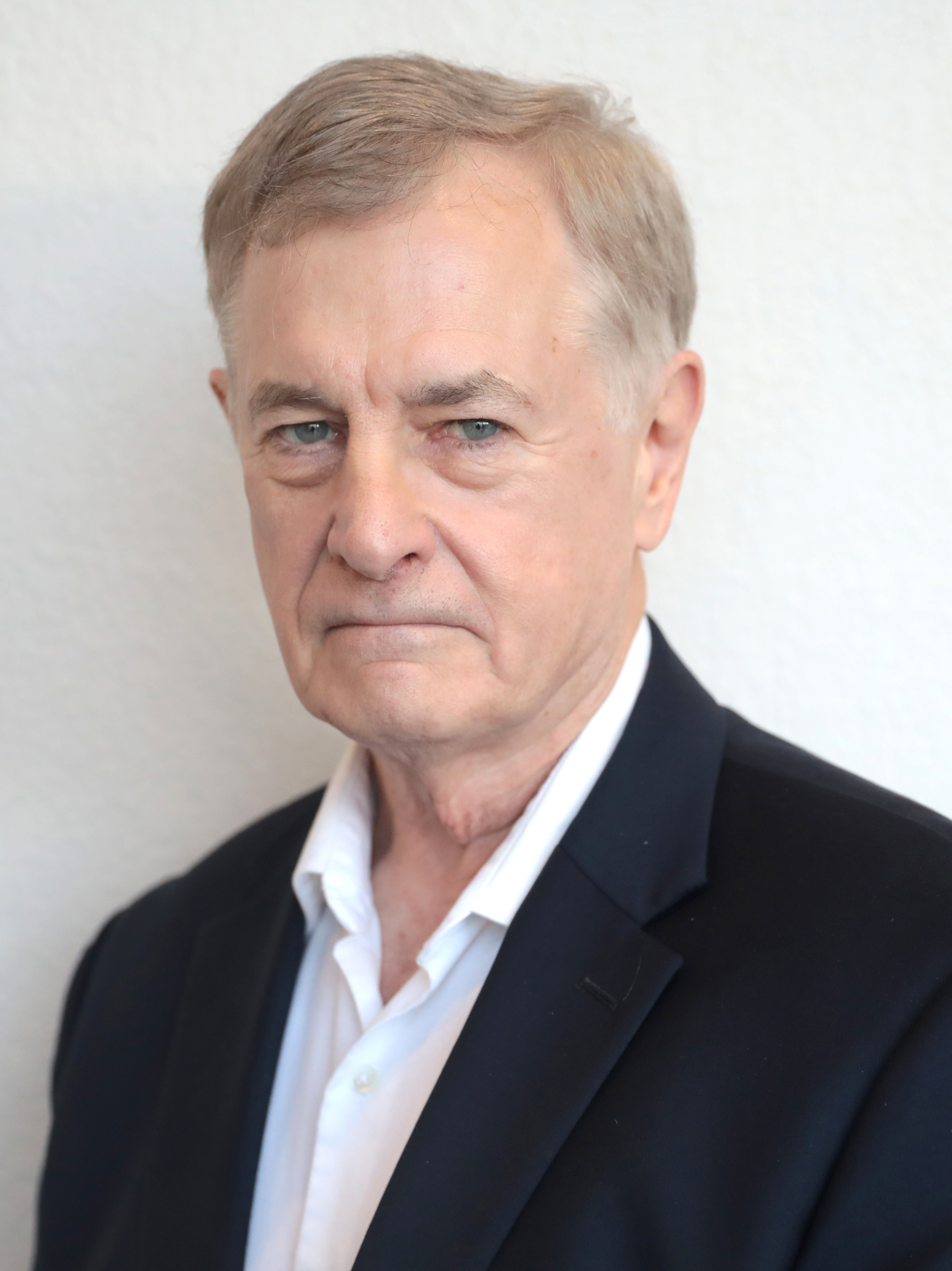
- Harrington at the 2022 Hazlitt Summit hosted by Young Americans for Liberty Foundation

Member of the New Hampshire House of Representatives from the Strafford 3 district
- Incumbent
- Assumed office 2016
- In office 2000–2004

Member of the New Hampshire Public Utilities Commission
- In office 2012–2013
- Succeeded by: Martin Honigberg

Personal details
- Born: October 24, 1953 (age 72) Medford, Massachusetts, U.S.
- Party: Republican
- Children: 2
- Education: University of Massachusetts Lowell (BS)

Michael D. Harrington (born October 24, 1953) is an American engineer and politician serving as a member of the New Hampshire House of Representatives for the Strafford 3 district. He previously served in the House from 2000 to 2004.

== Early life and education ==
Harrington was born in Medford, Massachusetts. He earned a Bachelor of Science degree in nuclear engineering from the University of Massachusetts Lowell in 1976.

== Career ==
Harrington worked as an engineer at the Norfolk Naval Shipyard from 1978 to 1980 and the Marble Hill Nuclear Power Plant from 1980 to 1983. From 1983 to 2004, Harrington worked as an engineering supervisor at the Seabrook Station Nuclear Power Plant. Harrington has also worked as an independent consultant and civilian engineer for the United States Navy. Harrington was appointed to the New Hampshire Public Utilities Commission in 2012 and served until 2013.

Harrington served as a member of the New Hampshire House of Representatives from 2000 to 2004 and was again elected in 2016.
