= Peter Bixby =

American politician

Member of the New Hampshire House of Representatives from the Strafford 13th district
- Incumbent
- Assumed office December 7, 2022
- Preceded by: Casey Conley

Member of the New Hampshire House of Representatives from the Strafford 17th district
- In office December 5, 2012 – December 7, 2022
- Succeeded by: Jessica LaMontagne

Personal details
- Party: Democratic
- Education: Attleboro High School; Yale University; Indiana University Bloomington

Peter Bixby is a New Hampshire politician.

== Education ==
Bixby graduated from Attleboro High School. Bixby earned a B.A. from Yale University in 1984 and a Ph.D. in comparative literature from Indiana University Bloomington in 1999.

== Political career ==
On November 6, 2012, Bixby was elected to the New Hampshire House of Representatives where he represents the Strafford 17 district. Bixby assumed office on December 5, 2012. Bixby is a Democrat. He now represents the Strafford 13 district.

== Personal life ==
Bixby resides in Dover, New Hampshire. Bixby is married and has two children.
