= Robert Healey (politician) =

American politician

Member of the New Hampshire House of Representatives from the Hillsborough 12th district
- In office December 7, 2022 – July 17, 2024

Personal details
- Born: Robert Vincent Healey
- Party: Republican

Robert Vincent Healey is an American politician. He was a member of the New Hampshire House of Representatives from the Hillsborough 12th district from 2022 to 2024. He resigned his seat in the House on July 17, 2024. A Republican, he endorsed Ron DeSantis in the 2024 Republican Party presidential primaries.

Healey is the son of Robert Elliot Healey and Ellen Patricia Kershaw. He was a resident of Bloomfield, Connecticut, before he became a resident of Merrimack, New Hampshire. Healey graduated from New Bedford High School in New Bedford, Massachusetts, in 1980. He participated in a virtual press conference with town and state politicians from Merrimack which called for the Saint Gobain Performance Plastics plant in the town to be closed after a report was released that found that air emissions from the plant had contaminated local groundwater with per- and polyfluoroalkyl substances, also known as "forever chemicals". In 2023, he cosponsored a bill to rename a bridge in Merrimack in honor of Dick Hinch.
