= Vanessa Sheehan =

American politician

Member of the New Hampshire House of Representatives from the Hillsborough 23rd district
- In office 2020 – December 7, 2022

Member of the New Hampshire House of Representatives from the Hillsborough 43rd district
- Incumbent
- Assumed office December 7, 2022

Personal details
- Born: October 16, 1973 (age 52)
- Party: Republican

Vanessa Sheehan is an American politician. Born on October 16, 1973, she is a New Hampshire native. She serves as a Republican member for the Hillsborough 43rd district (Milford NH) of the New Hampshire House of Representatives.
