= Michael Moffett (politician) =

American politician

Member of the New Hampshire House of Representatives from the Merrimack 4th district
- Incumbent
- Assumed office December 7, 2022
- Preceded by: Tom Schamberg

Member of the New Hampshire House of Representatives from the Merrimack 9th district
- In office December 2, 2020 – December 7, 2022
- Preceded by: George Saunderson
- Succeeded by: Murlel Hall; Angela Brennan; David Luneau; Mel Myler
- In office December 7, 2016 – December 5, 2018
- Preceded by: George Saunderson
- Succeeded by: George Saunderson

Personal details
- Party: Republican
- Profession: Educator

Michael Moffett is an American politician serving as a Republican member of the New Hampshire House of Representatives, and represents the Merrimack 4th district.

== Early life, education and military service ==
Moffett studied at the Plymouth State College, University of New Hampshire and the University of San Diego. Following his studies, he taught in public schools, parochial schools, military schools, and also post-secondary educational institutions.

Moffett served as a reserve Marine Corps infantry officer and retired as a Lieutenant colonel. He was deployed to the Persian Gulf and Afghanistan.

He was a Jeopardy! contestant where he wore his Marine Corps dress blue uniform.
