= Jeanine Notter =

American politician

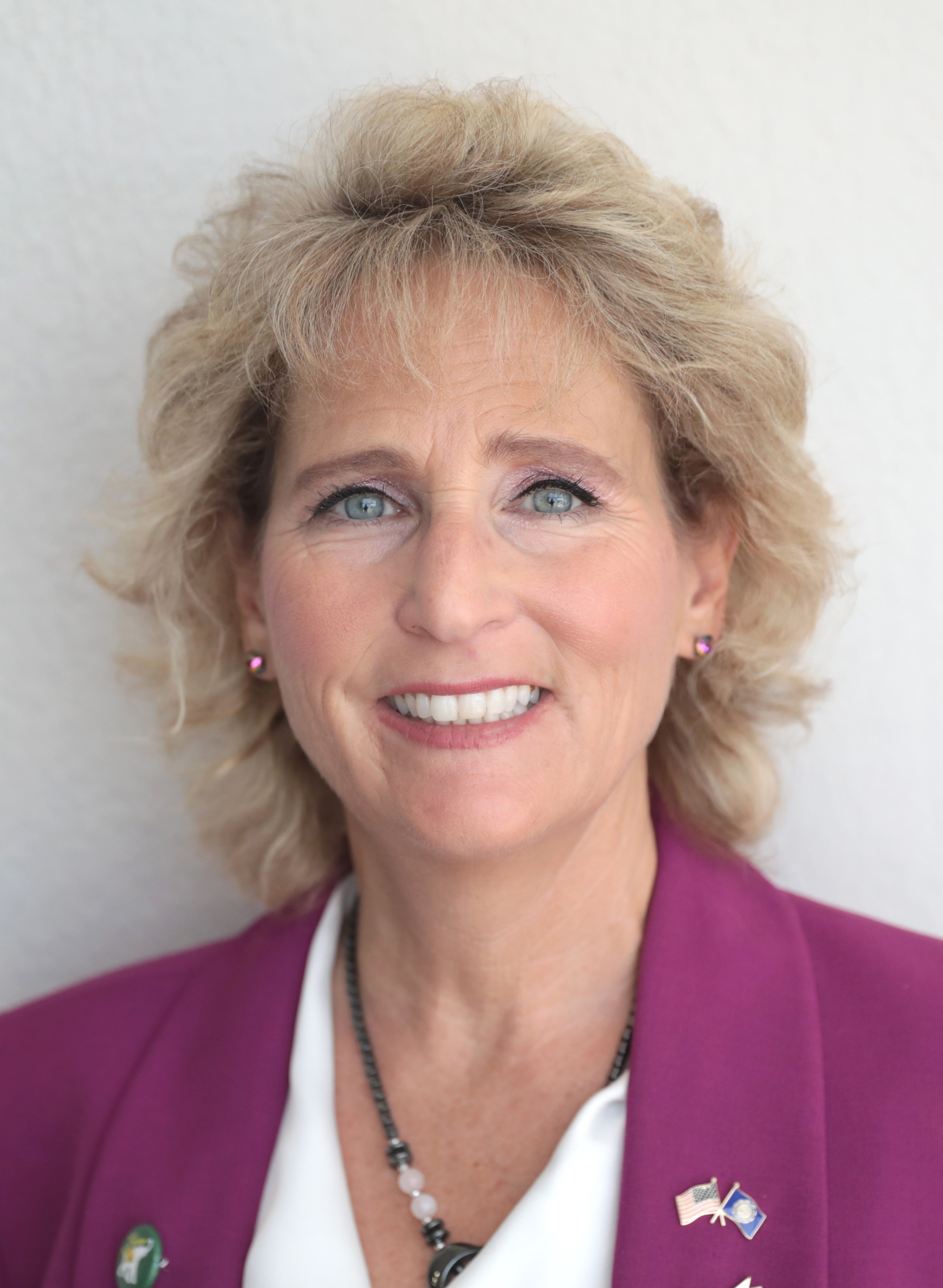
- Notter at the 2022 Hazlitt Summit hosted by Young Americans for Liberty Foundation

Member of the New Hampshire House of Representatives from the Hillsborough 12th district
- Incumbent
- Assumed office December 2010

Personal details
- Party: Republican
- Spouse: Stephan
- Children: 6

Jeanine M. Notter is an American politician serving as a member of the New Hampshire House of Representatives from the Hillsborough 12th district. She assumed office in 2010.

Notter was first elected to the New Hampshire House of Representatives in 2010 and was chosen as House majority whip in 2021. Before going into politics Notter was a fitness trainer. Notter is a Republican.

== Career ==
Notter was first elected to the New Hampshire House of Representatives in 2010 and was chosen as House majority whip in 2021. Notter is a Republican. She is a member of the House Science, Technology and Energy Committee. Since 2006, Notter has also hosted a public access television show called Chattin' with Jeanine.
