= Gail Pare =

American politician

Member of the New Hampshire House of Representatives from the Strafford 16th district
- In office December 7, 2022 – December 4, 2024
- Preceded by: Sherry Frost
- Succeeded by: Gary Gilmore

Member of the New Hampshire House of Representatives

Personal details
- Party: Democratic

Gail Pare is an American politician. She served as a Democratic member for the Strafford 16th district of the New Hampshire House of Representatives.
