= Janet Wall =

American politician (born 1949)

Member of the New Hampshire House of Representatives from the Strafford 6th district
- Incumbent
- Assumed office 1986

Personal details
- Born: November 21, 1949 (age 76) Portsmouth, New Hampshire
- Party: Democratic
- Education: University of New Hampshire
- Occupation: former consultant, teacher

Janet Wall (born November 21, 1949) is an American politician in the state of New Hampshire. She is a member of the New Hampshire House of Representatives, sitting as a Democrat from the Strafford 6 district, having been first elected in 1986.

== See also ==
- New Hampshire House of Representatives
- New Hampshire Democratic Party
