= Arlene Quaratiello =

American politician

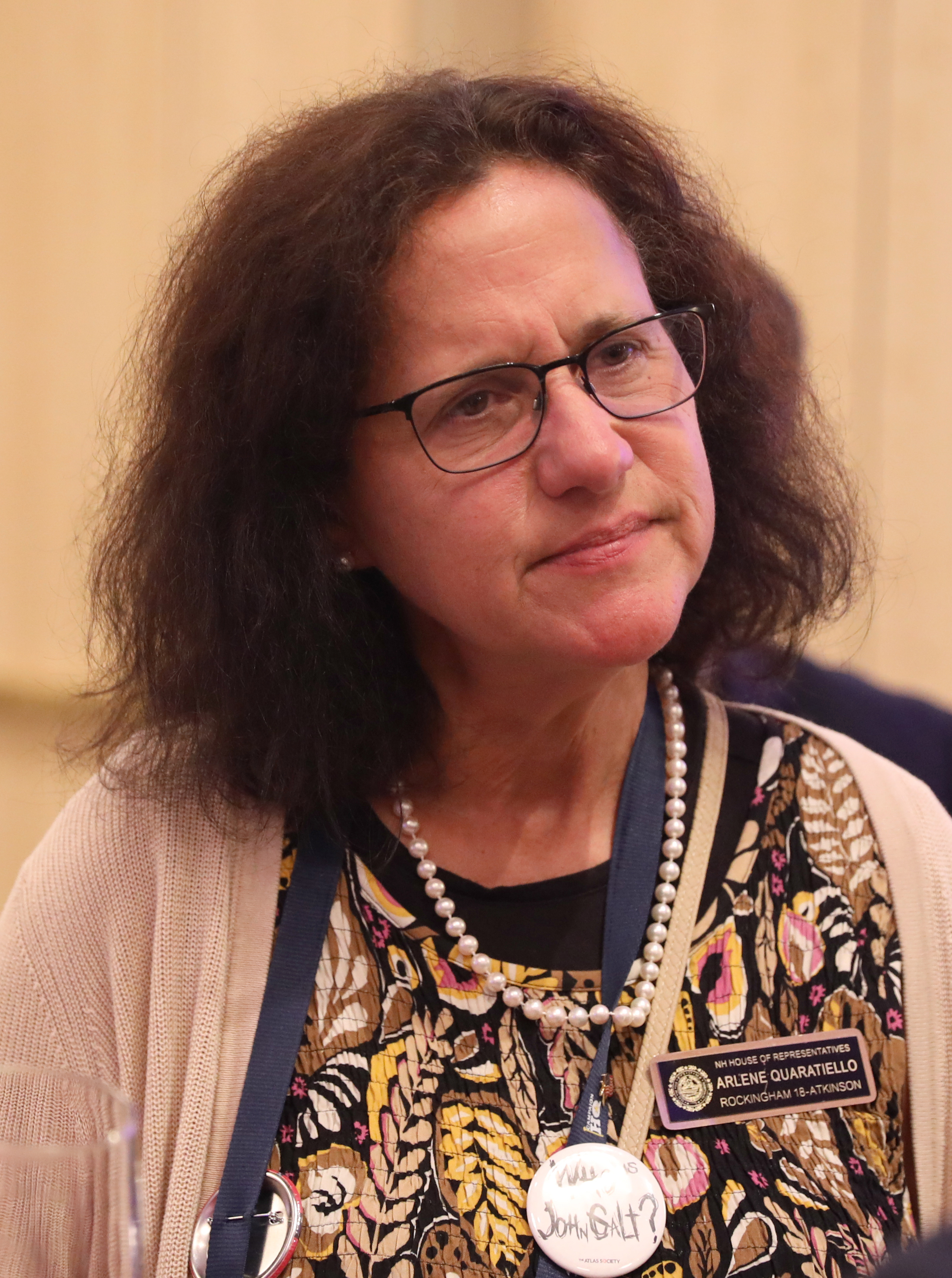

Member of the New Hampshire House of Representatives from the Rockingham 18th district
- Incumbent
- Assumed office December 7, 2022

Personal details
- Party: Republican

Arlene Quaratiello is an American politician. She served as a Republican member for the Rockingham 18th district of the New Hampshire House of Representatives.
