= Damond Ford =

American politician

Member of the New Hampshire House of Representatives from the Hillsborough 40th district
- In office December 7, 2022 – August 30, 2024

Personal details
- Party: Democratic

Damond Ford is an American politician. He served as a Democratic member for the Hillsborough 40th district of the New Hampshire House of Representatives.

Ford resigned from the House on August 30, 2024.
