= Peter B. Schmidt =

American politician

Member of the New Hampshire House of Representatives from the Strafford 19th district
- Incumbent
- Assumed office December 4, 2002

Personal details
- Party: Democratic
- Education: Northern Illinois University (B.A.); Northwestern University (M.A., A.B.D.)
- Profession: University Instructor (retired)

Military service
- Allegiance: United States
- Branch/service: United States Marine Corps
- Years of service: 1956-1958

Peter B. Schmidt is a Democratic member of the New Hampshire House of Representatives for Strafford County's 19th district. The 19th district includes wards one and two in Dover.
