= Paul Ayer (politician) =

American politician

Member of New Hampshire House of Representatives for Hillsborough 34
- In office December 2, 2020 – December 7, 2022
- Preceded by: Kathleen Hoelzel

Personal details
- Party: Republican

Paul F. Ayer is an American politician. He was a member of the New Hampshire House of Representatives and represented Hillsborough 34th district.
