= James M. Murphy (New Hampshire politician) =

American politician

Member of the New Hampshire House of Representatives from the Grafton 12th district
- Incumbent
- Assumed office December 2, 2020

Personal details
- Party: Democratic

James M. Murphy is an American politician. He serves as a Democratic member for the Grafton 12th district of the New Hampshire House of Representatives.
