= Joseph Pitre =

American politician

Joseph Pitre (born January 23, 1946) is an American politician. He serves as a Republican member of the New Hampshire House of Representatives, representing the town of Farmington.

Pitre attended the Community College of the Air Force, Southern New Hampshire University, and Golden Gate University.
