= Glenn Bailey =

American politician

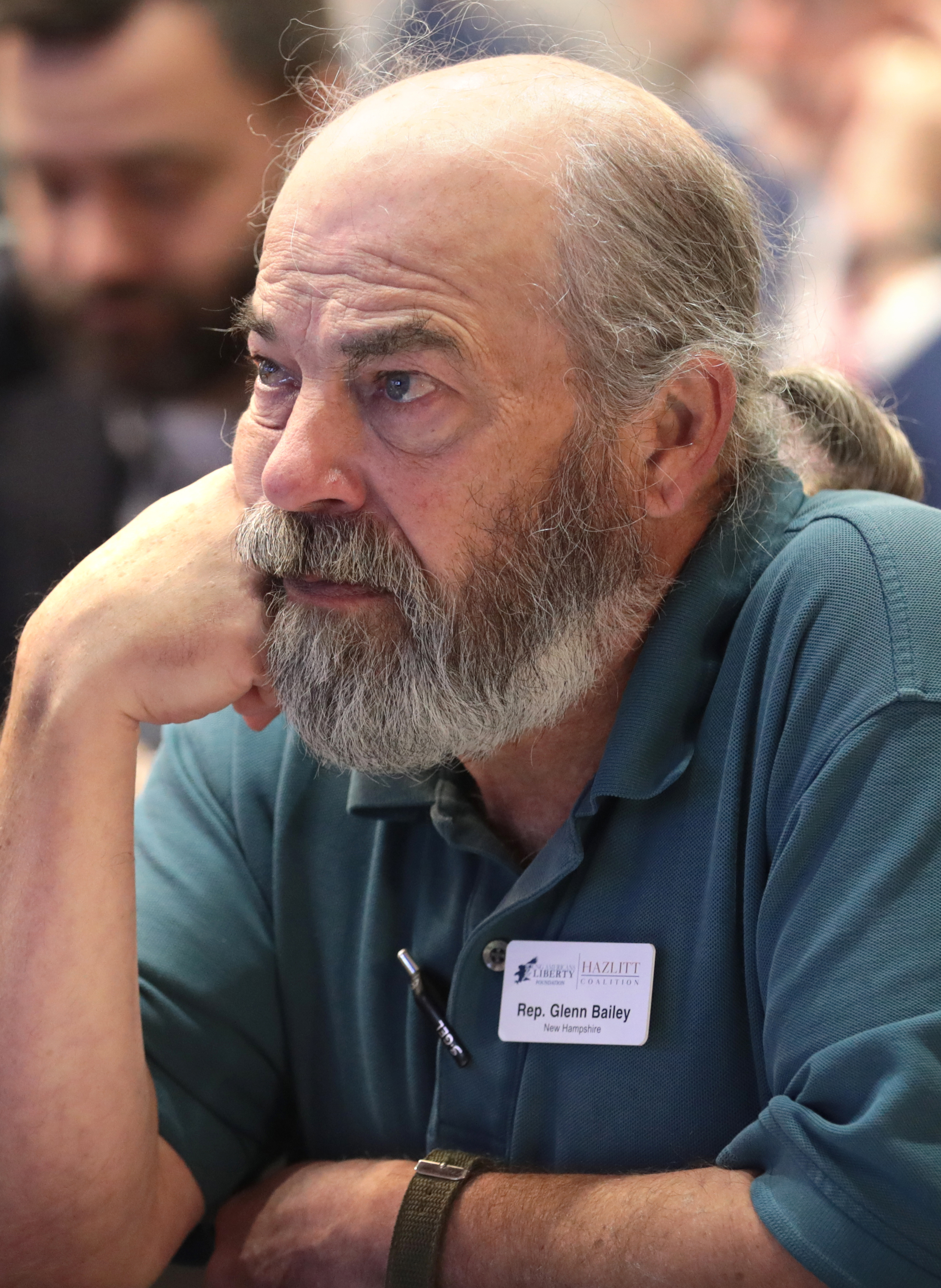
- Bailey in 2022

Member of the New Hampshire House of Representatives from the Strafford 2nd district
- Incumbent
- Assumed office December 7, 2022

Member of the New Hampshire House of Representatives from the Strafford 1st district
- In office December 2, 2020 – December 7, 2022

Personal details
- Party: Republican

Glenn Bailey is an American politician. He serves as a Republican member for the Strafford 2nd district of the New Hampshire House of Representatives.
