= Jodi Nelson =

American politician

Member of the New Hampshire House of Representatives from the Rockingham 6th district
- In office 2021 – December 7, 2022

Member of the New Hampshire House of Representatives from the Rockingham 13th district
- In office December 7, 2022 – present

Personal details
- Party: Republican

Jodi Nelson is an American politician. She serves as a Republican member for the Rockingham 13th district of the New Hampshire House of Representatives.
