= Bill King (New Hampshire politician) =

American politician

Member of the New Hampshire House of Representatives from the Hillsborough 23rd district
- Incumbent
- Assumed office December 2, 2020

Personal details
- Born: Queensbury, New York
- Party: Republican
- Website: King 4 NH

Bill King is an American politician from New Hampshire.

== Early life and education ==
King was born in Queensbury, New York. After graduating high school, King joined the United States Navy, and served there for four years. There, he was trained to be an aviation electrician's mate.

== Career ==
King worked for General Motors for 35 years as an engineer and in management positions. He is currently semi-retired. On November 3, 2020, King was elected to the New Hampshire House of Representatives where he represents the Hillsborough 23 district. He assumed office on December 2, 2020. He is a Republican.

== Personal life ==
King resides in Milford, New Hampshire. King married in 1985. With his wife, he had four children. In 2016, his wife died of sarcoma.
