= Skip Rollins =

American politician

Member of the New Hampshire House of Representatives from the Sullivan 6th district
- Incumbent
- Assumed office December 5, 2012

Personal details
- Party: Republican

Skip Rollins is a New Hampshire politician.

== Career ==
On November 6, 2012, Rollins was elected to the New Hampshire House of Representatives where he represents the Sullivan 6 district. Rollins assumed office on December 5, 2012. Rollins is a Republican.

== Personal life ==
Rollins resides in Newport, New Hampshire.
