= Rebecca McWilliams =

American attorney, architect, and politician

Member of the New Hampshire House of Representatives from the Merrimack 27 district
- In office December 5, 2018 – December 4, 2024

Personal details
- Born: September 9, 1982 (age 43)
- Party: Democratic
- Education: Roger Williams University (BArch); Suffolk University (JD)

Rebecca McWilliams (born September 9, 1982) is an American attorney, architect, and politician serving as a member of the New Hampshire House of Representatives from the Merrimack 27 district. She assumed office on December 5, 2018.

== Education ==
McWilliams earned a Bachelor of Architecture degree from Roger Williams University in 2004 and a Juris Doctor in construction and contracts law from the Suffolk University Law School in 2012.

== Career ==
From 2002 to 2004, McWilliams worked as a construction liaison and CAD drafter for Roger Williams University. She later worked as a designer for Pinnacle Partners and KFP Architects. From 2006 to 2011, she was an architect and BIM manager for Symmes Maini and McKee Associates. During law school, she worked in a law office and as policy director for Massachusetts State Rep. Chris Walsh. From 2011 to 2013, she was a software application engineer for myCADD. In 2013 and 2014, she worked as an associate attorney at Donovan Hatem, where she specialized in claims and risk management for design professionals. She founded McWilliams Law in 2014. Since 2015, she has worked as a director of MINDS-i Robotics and adjunct professor of contracts law at Boston Architectural College. She is also the co-founder of Policyholder Pros. She was elected to the New Hampshire House of Representatives in 2018.
