= David Rochefort =

American politician

Member of the New Hampshire Senate from the 1st district
- Incumbent
- Assumed office December 4, 2024
- Preceded by: Carrie Gendreau

Member of the New Hampshire House of Representatives from the Grafton 1st district
- In office December 7, 2022 – December 4, 2024 Serving with Matthew Simon, Linda Massimilla
- Preceded by: Joseph DePalma IV; Linda Massimilla
- Succeeded by: Darrell A. Louis; Joseph Barton; Calvin Beaulier (elect)

Personal details
- Party: Republican

David Rochefort is an American politician. He serves as a Republican member for the Grafton 1st district of the New Hampshire House of Representatives. On September 10, 2024, he became the Republican nominee for New Hampshire State Senate District 1. He won the general election in November.
