= Yury Polozov =

Russian-American politician

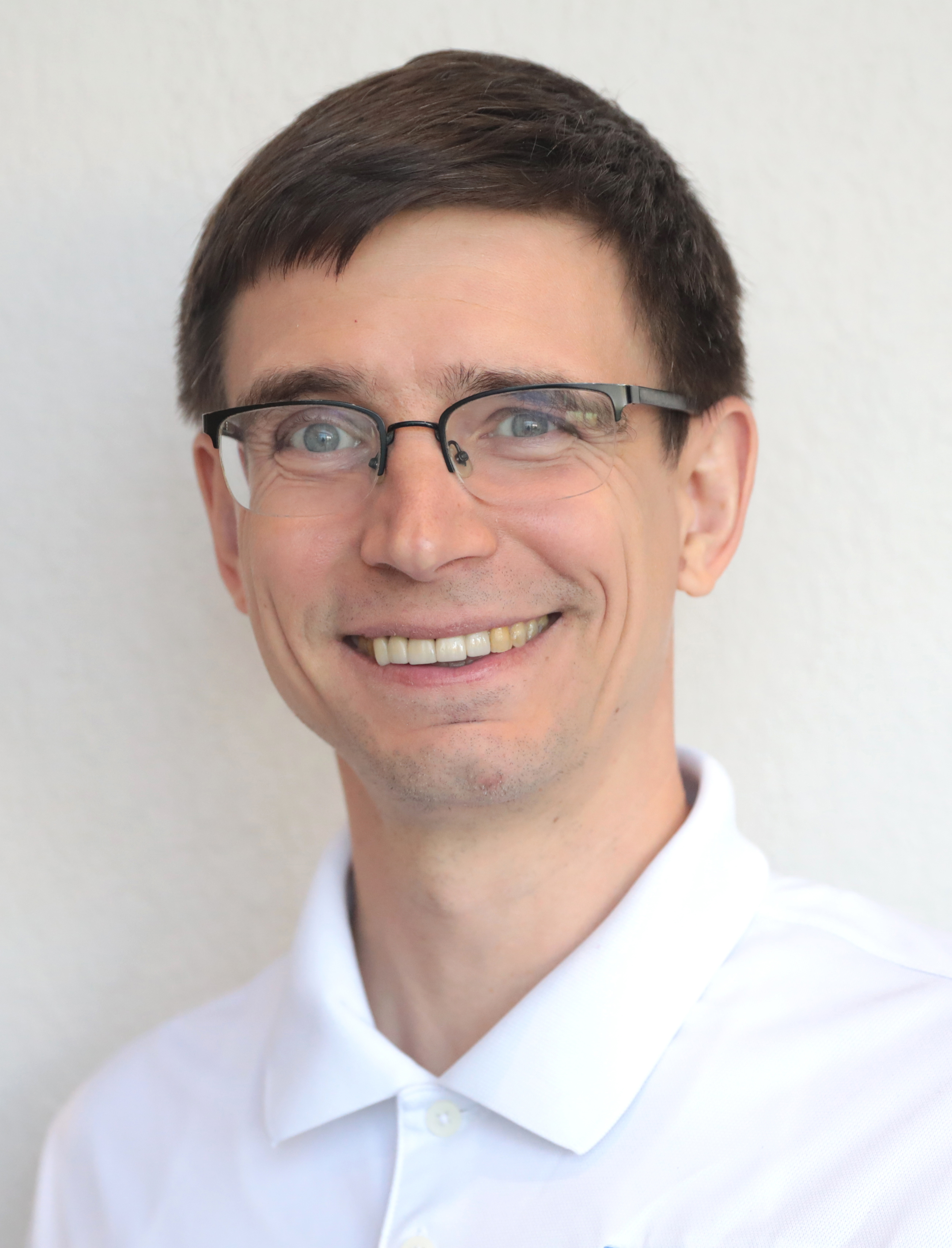
- Polozov in 2022

Member of the New Hampshire House of Representatives from the Merrimack 10th district
- Incumbent
- Assumed office December 7, 2022

Personal details
- Born: Russia
- Party: Republican

Yury Polozov is a Russian-American politician. He is a Republican member for the Merrimack 10th district of the New Hampshire House of Representatives.
