= Benjamin Bartlett =

Benjamin Bartlett (1714–1787), was an English numismatical and topographical writer.

== Life ==
Bartlett was of an old-established quaker family at Bradford, Yorkshire, where his father was an apothecary, having for his apprentice the afterwards celebrated Dr John Fothergill. At an early age Bartlett showed a great aptitude for antiquarian pursuits. He left Bradford for London, where he set up an apothecary's business in Red Lion Street. This, however, he was eventually obliged to relinquish on account of failing health, resigning it to his partner, Mr. French. In his spare time he formed an extensive collection of English coins and seals from the Saxon time downwards, which was sold by auction after his death. His knowledge in the various departments of numismatology was most extensive, and we are told that it would have been difficult to find his equal on this subject. In 1764 he was elected a fellow of the Society of Antiquaries, and at the time of his death was their treasurer.

His only literary venture was a memoir on the Episcopal Coins of Durham, and the Monastic Coins of Reading, minted during the reigns of Edward I, II, and III, appropriated to their respective owners, this having been the substance of a paper read before the Society of Antiquaries on 5 March 1778. He had, however, prepared for publication Manduessedum Romanorum, or The History and Antiquities of the Parish of Manceter' afterwards printed in Nichols's Topographical Antiquities. He also received the public thanks of Dr. Nash for the valuable communications he contributed to the History of Worcestershire, and Gough, in his prospectus prefixed to the History of Thetford, published in 1789, acknowledges himself to have been indebted to "that able master, Mr. Benjamin Bartlett", for the arrangement of the coins.

He died of dropsy on 2 March 1787, at the age of 73, and was interred in the quakers' burying-ground at Hartshill, Warwickshire.
