= Lisa Post (politician) =

American politician

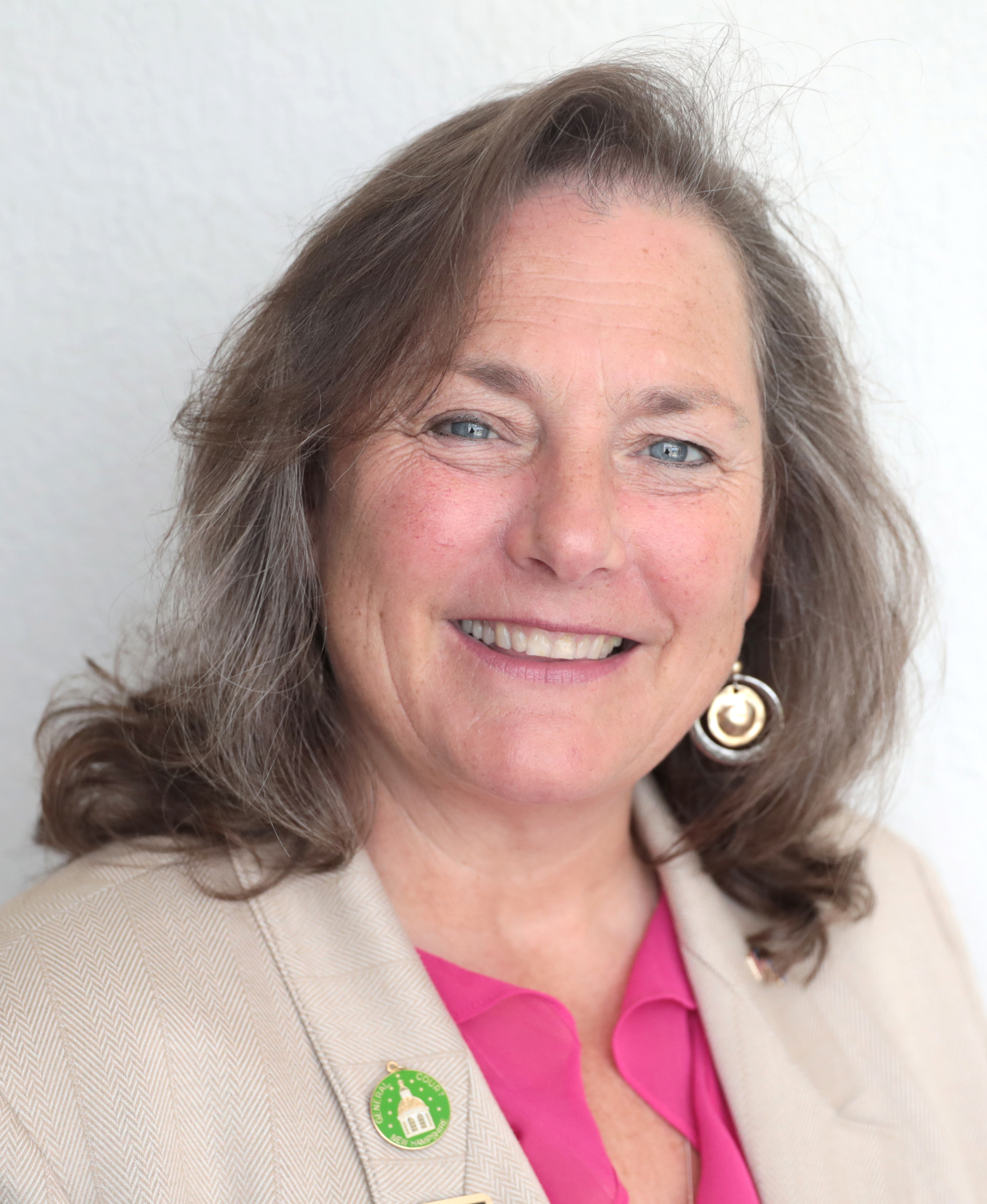
- Post in 2022

Member of the New Hampshire House of Representatives from the Hillsborough 42nd district
- Incumbent
- Assumed office December 7, 2022

Member of the New Hampshire House of Representatives from the Hillsborough 4th district
- In office December 2, 2020 – December 7, 2022

Personal details
- Party: Republican

Lisa Post is an American politician. She serves as a Republican member for the Hillsborough 42nd district of the New Hampshire House of Representatives.
