= Martin Jack (politician) =

American politician

Member of the New Hampshire House of Representatives from the Hillsborough 10th district
- Incumbent
- Assumed office December 7, 2022

Personal details
- Party: Democratic

Martin Jack is an American politician. He serves as a Democratic member for the Hillsborough 10th district of the New Hampshire House of Representatives.
