= William Infantine =

American politician

State Representative

Member of the New Hampshire House of Representatives
- Incumbent
- Assumed office December 3, 2020
- In office December 4, 2002 – December 7, 2016

Personal details
- Party: Republican
- Education: Saint Michael's College (BS)

William Infantine is an American politician. He served as a Republican member for the Hillsborough 16th district of the New Hampshire House of Representatives. He was the chair of the Labor, Industrial and Rehabilitative Services Committee.

== Personal life ==
Infantine has resided in Manchester, New Hampshire, since 1997. He has two children. Infantine graduated from Milford Area Senior High School in 1982 and from Saint Michael's College with a Bachelor of Science in Business Administration in 1986.

== Political career ==
Infantine served in the New Hampshire House of Representatives from 2002 to 2016. He served again from 2020 to 2024. He currently chairs the Labor, Industrial and Rehabilitative Services Committee.

In April 2014, Infantine received criticism for comments he made during the New Hampshire House of Representatives vote on the "Paycheck Equity Act". Infantine stated , "Men by and large make more because of some of the things they do. Their jobs are, by and large, more riskier. They don't mind working nights and weekends. They don't mind working overtime, or outdoors in the elements ... Men are more motivated by money than women are.", and cited Bureau of Labor Statistic findings in support.
