= Mary Ann Kimball =

American politician

Member of New Hampshire House of Representatives for Rockingham 6
- In office December 2, 2020 – December 7, 2022

Personal details
- Party: Republican

Mary Ann Kimball is an American politician. She was elected a member of the New Hampshire House of Representatives in the 2020 election.
