= Mark McLean (politician) =

American politician

Member of the New Hampshire House of Representatives from the Hillsborough 15th district
- Incumbent
- Assumed office December 7, 2022
- In office December 3, 2014 – December 7 2016

Member of the New Hampshire House of Representatives from the Hillsborough 44th district
- In office December 7, 2016 – December 7, 2022

Personal details
- Born: New Brunswick, Canada
- Party: Republican

Mark McLean is an American politician. He serves as a Republican member for the Hillsborough 15th district of the New Hampshire House of Representatives.
