= Kristine Perez =

American politician

Member of the New Hampshire House of Representatives from the Rockingham 16th district
- Incumbent
- Assumed office December 7, 2022

Personal details
- Party: Republican

Kristine Perez is an American politician. She serves as a Republican member for the Rockingham 16th district of the New Hampshire House of Representatives.
