= Barbara Griffin =

American politician

Member of the New Hampshire House of Representatives
- In office December 3, 2014 – December 7, 2022
- Constituency: Hillsborough 6

Personal details
- Party: Republican

Barbara J. Griffin is an American politician from New Hampshire. She served in the New Hampshire House of Representatives from 2014 to 2022.
