= Gregg Hough =

American politician

Member of the New Hampshire House of Representatives
- In office December 2, 2020 – December 7, 2022
- Constituency: Belknap 3

Personal details
- Born: Laconia, New Hampshire
- Party: Republican
- Education: Southern New Hampshire University

Gregg Hough is an American politician from New Hampshire. He served in the New Hampshire House of Representatives.
