= Mary Hakken-Phillips =

American attorney and politician

Mary A. Hakken-Phillips

Member of the New Hampshire House of Representatives from the Grafton 12 district
- Incumbent
- Assumed office December 2, 2020

Personal details
- Party: Democratic
- Education: Alma College (BA); Loyola University Chicago (MA); Michigan State University (JD)

Mary A. Hakken-Phillips is an American attorney and politician serving as a member of the New Hampshire House of Representatives from the Grafton 12 district. She assumed office on December 2, 2020.

== Education ==
Hakken-Phillips earned a Bachelor of Arts degree in political science and government from Alma College, a Master of Arts in political science and government from Loyola University Chicago, and a Juris Doctor from the Michigan State University College of Law.

== Career ==
Hakken-Phillips began her career as an intern in the office of Senator Kay Bailey Hutchison. She also worked as a legal assistant for Nancy E. Gallagher, a lawyer in Alma, Michigan. As a master's degree student, she worked as a research assistant for Susan Gluck Mezey, a professor at Loyola University Chicago. From 2006 to 2009, Hakken-Phillips worked as the executive assistant to the president and CEO of Mutual Bank. She was also an assistant at United Central Bank and Flexpoint Ford. As a law student, she completed an externship at the University of Michigan Health System Compliance Office. Since 2018, she has been an attorney at Tarbell & Brodich. Hakken-Phillips was elected to the New Hampshire House of Representatives in 2020.
