= Keith Erf =

American politician

Keith Erf is an American politician who is a Republican Party member of the New Hampshire House of Representatives.

In the chamber, he is vice chair of the finance committee.
