= Jennifer Rhodes (politician) =

American politician

Member of the New Hampshire House of Representatives from the Cheshire 15th district
- In office 2020 – December 7, 2022

Member of the New Hampshire House of Representatives from the Cheshire 17th district
- Incumbent
- Assumed office December 7, 2022

Personal details
- Party: Republican

Jennifer Rhodes is an American politician. She serves as a Republican member for the Cheshire 17th district of the New Hampshire House of Representatives.
