= James Connor (politician) =

American politician

Member of the New Hampshire House of Representatives from the Strafford 19th district
- Incumbent
- Assumed office December 7, 2022

Personal details
- Party: Republican

James Connor is an American politician. He serves as a Republican member for the Strafford 19th district of the New Hampshire House of Representatives.
