= Erica Layon =

American politician

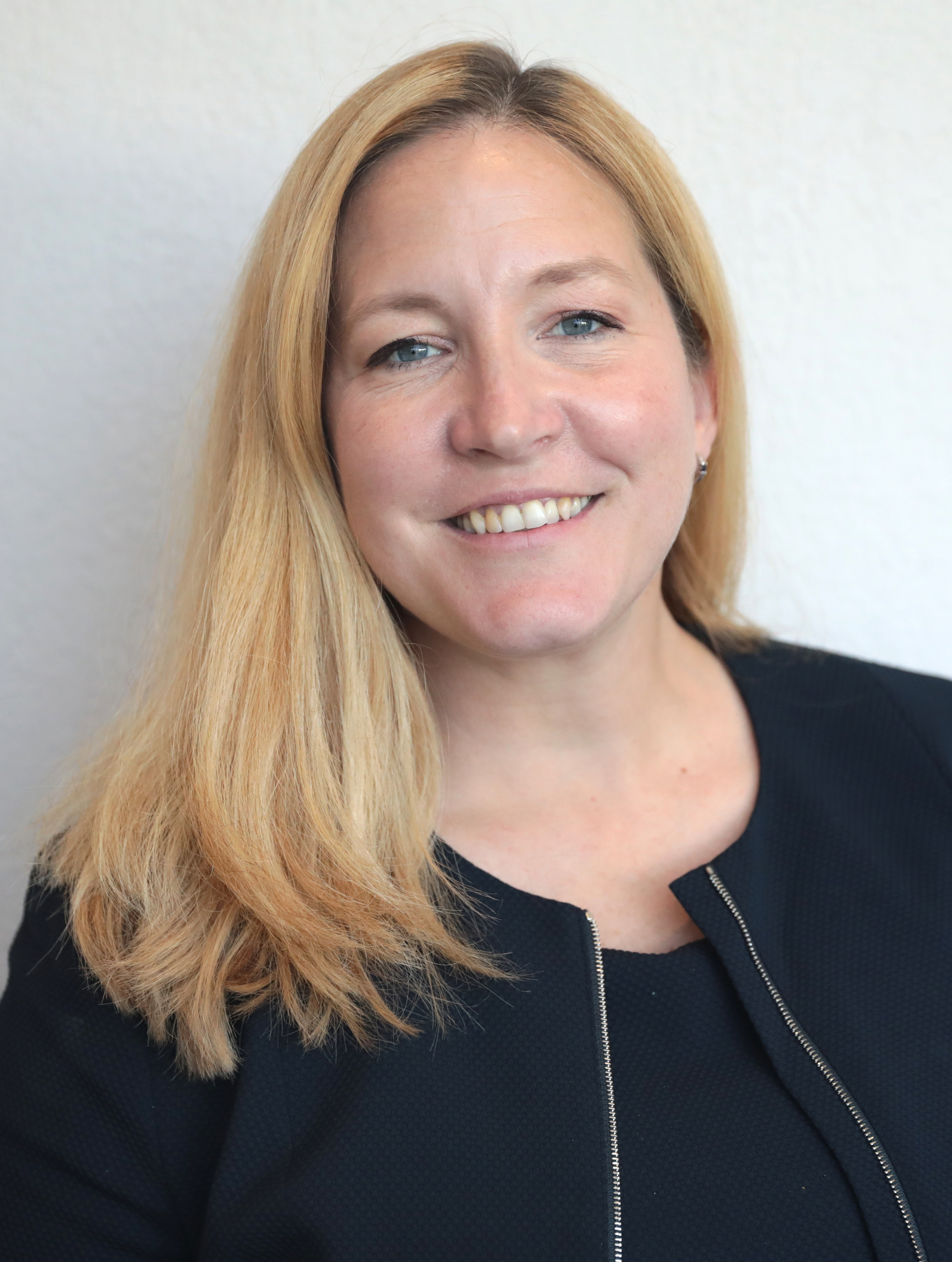
- Layon in 2022

Member of the New Hampshire House of Representatives
- In office December 3, 2020 – Present

Personal details
- Party: Republican
- Education: Massachusetts Institute of Technology (BS)

Erica Layon is an American politician. She serves as a Republican member for the Rockingham 13th district of the New Hampshire House of Representatives. Layon currently serves as vice chair of the Health, Human Services and Elderly Affairs Committee.

== Personal life ==
Layon resides in Derry, New Hampshire. Layon graduated from the Massachusetts Institute of Technology with a Bachelor of Science degree in economics in 2001.

== Political career ==
Layon was first elected to the New Hampshire House of Representatives in 2020 election. She currently represents Rockingham's 13th district as a Republican member. She has served as vice chair of the Health, Human Services and Elderly Affairs Committee since 2021.

== Controversies ==
In May 2022 Layon was arrested for driving while intoxicated. A video of the arrest surfaced in which she implies that a town councilor paid police to arrest her.
