= Jeffrey Rich =

American politician

Member of the New Hampshire House of Representatives from the Strafford 12th district
- Incumbent
- Assumed office December 7, 2022

Personal details
- Party: Democratic

Jeffrey Rich is an American politician. He serves as a Democratic member for the Strafford 12th district of the New Hampshire House of Representatives.
