= Shelley Devine =

American politician

Member of the New Hampshire House of Representatives from the Hillsborough 5 district
- Incumbent
- Assumed office December 7, 2022

Personal details
- Political party: Democratic

Shelley Devine is an American politician. A member of the Democratic Party, she has represented Hillsborough 5 in the New Hampshire House of Representatives since 2022. She is also a member of the NH House of Representatives Judiciary Committee (2022-2024).
