= Arnold Davis (politician) =

American politician

Member of the New Hampshire House of Representatives from the Coos 2nd district
- Incumbent
- Assumed office December 2, 2020

Personal details
- Party: Republican
- Spouse: Debi
- Children: 2
- Occupation: Home inspector, farmer

Arnold Davis is an American politician. He serves as a Republican member for the Coos 2nd district of the New Hampshire House of Representatives.

Davis is a licensed home inspector and owns a blueberry farm. He is married to his wife Debi, and has two adult children. He resides in Milan, New Hampshire.
