= Jacob Brouillard =

American politician

Member of the New Hampshire House of Representatives from the Rockingham 1st district
- Incumbent
- Assumed office December 7, 2022

Personal details
- Party: Republican

Jacob Brouillard is an American politician. He serves as a Republican member for the Rockingham 1st district of the New Hampshire House of Representatives.
