= Dru Fox =

American politician

Member of the New Hampshire House of Representatives from the Cheshire 6th district
- In office December 2, 2020 – December 7, 2022

Member of the New Hampshire House of Representatives from the Cheshire 2nd district
- Incumbent
- Assumed office December 7, 2022

Personal details
- Party: Democratic

Dru Fox is an American politician. She served as a Democratic member for the Cheshire 2nd district of the New Hampshire House of Representatives.

== Personal life ==
She is Jewish.
