= Norman Major =

American politician (1934–2025)

Member of the New Hampshire House of Representatives from the 14th Rockingham district
- In office December 5, 2012 – December 7, 2022
- Preceded by: Multi-member district
- Succeeded by: Kenneth L. Weyler; Deborah L. Hobson

Member of the New Hampshire House of Representatives from the 8th Rockingham district
- In office December 1, 2004 – December 5, 2012
- Preceded by: District created
- Succeeded by: Multi-member district

Member of the New Hampshire House of Representatives from the 79th Rockingham district
- In office December 4, 2002 – December 1, 2004
- Preceded by: District created
- Succeeded by: District abolished

Member of the New Hampshire House of Representatives from the 16th Rockingham district
- In office December 4, 1996 – December 4, 2002
- Preceded by: Merilyn P. Senter
- Succeeded by: District abolished

Personal details
- Born: April 9, 1934 Keene, New Hampshire, U.S.
- Died: April 15, 2025 (aged 91) Plaistow, New Hampshire, U.S.
- Party: Republican

Norman Major (April 9, 1934 – April 15, 2025) was an American politician and member of the New Hampshire House of Representatives, representing Rockingham District 14 (Atkinson and Plaistow). He was Chairman of the Ways and Means Committee and lived in Plaistow.

== Life and career ==
Major was born in Keene, New Hampshire. He married Brenda Major in 1961; the Majors have four sons and six grandchildren. Major graduated from the University of New Hampshire and earned an MSEE from Northeastern University. He served in the U.S. Army and was retired from a career in engineering management with AT&T.

Major died in Plaistow, New Hampshire on April 15, 2025, at the age of 91.
