= Kimberly Rice =

American politician

Kim Rice
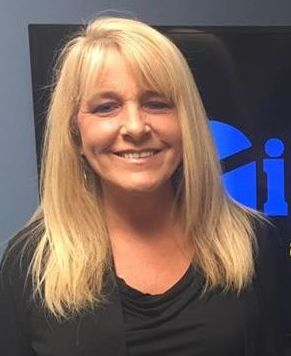

Speaker pro tempore of the New Hampshire House of Representatives
- In office December 2, 2020 – December 7, 2022
- Leader: Dick Hinch; Sherman Packard
- Preceded by: Lucy Weber
- Succeeded by: Laurie Sanborn

Member of the New Hampshire House of Representatives from the Hillsborough 37th district
- In office December 3, 2014 – December 7, 2022

Personal details
- Born: Dover, New Hampshire, U.S.
- Party: Republican

Kimberly A. Rice is an American politician who served as speaker pro tempore of the New Hampshire House of Representatives.

== Career ==
On November 4, 2014, Rice was elected to the New Hampshire House of Representatives where she represents the Hillsborough 37 district. Rice assumed office on December 3, 2014. Rice is a Republican. Rice served as the chair of the House's Children and Family Law Committee during this time.

In 2020, after Republicans flipped the House, Rice was appointed speaker pro tempore by house speaker Dick Hinch. Following Hinch’s death from COVID-19-related complications shortly after his election, Rice was retained as speaker pro tempore by new house speaker Sherman Packard. In December 2020, mere days after Hinch's death, Rice announced via a Facebook post that she had contracted COVID-19, describing the virus as "very real". Unlike Hinch, however, Rice recovered from her infection. Unlike several other New Hampshire Republicans, Rice has publicly expressed her support for wearing face masks to prevent the spread of COVID-19. In an interview with The Eagle-Tribune given during her recovery, Rice expressed her concern over the polarization of American politics and the role social media has played in intensifying that polarization.

In addition to Rice's duties as speaker pro tempore, Rice also serves on the New Hampshire Council for Thriving Children, the Oversight Commission on Children's Services, and the Commission to Review Child Abuse Fatalities. She also serves on the House's Rules Committee and Judiciary Committee. Rice has a notably pro-Second Amendment and pro-gun rights record, voting against a bill that banned guns on the floor of the New Hampshire House of Representatives in 2019 as well as voting against a "red-flag" gun bill in 2020. She has also fought to keep child marriage legal in her state.

== Personal life ==
Rice resides in Hudson, New Hampshire. Rice is married and has seven children.

New Hampshire House of Representatives
Preceded by Lucy Weber	Speaker pro tempore of the New Hampshire House of Representatives; 2020–2022	Succeeded by Laurie Sanborn
