= Douglas Thomas (New Hampshire politician) =

American politician

Member of the New Hampshire House of Representatives
- Incumbent
- Assumed office December 3, 2014

Personal details
- Party: Republican
- Education: Lowell Technological Institute (BS); University of Montana (MBA)

Douglas Thomas is an American politician. He serves as a Republican member for the Rockingham 16th district of the New Hampshire House of Representatives. He currently serves as vice chair of the Science, Technology and Energy Committee.

== Early life ==
Thomas was born in Staten Island, New York, and moved to Orford, New Hampshire, at age 9. He graduated from Hanover High School in 1968. Thomas received a Bachelor of Science in plastics technology from the Lowell Technological Institute in 1972 and a Master of Business Administration from the University of Montana in 1984. Thomas is a retired United States Air Force and Air National Guard veteran.

== New Hampshire House of Representatives ==
Thomas was first elected to the New Hampshire House of Representatives in 2014. He currently serves as vice chair of the Science, Technology and Energy Committee.

== Personal life ==
Thomas resides in Londonderry, New Hampshire.
