= Mike Bordes =

American politician

Member of the New Hampshire House of Representatives from the Belknap 5th district
- Incumbent
- Assumed office December 7, 2022

Member of the New Hampshire House of Representatives from the Belknap 3 Mayor Of The City Of Laconia district
- In office December 2, 2020 – December 7, 2022

Personal details
- Party: Republican

Mike Bordes is an American politician. He serves as a Republican member for the Belknap 5th district of the New Hampshire House of Representatives. He is also the mayor of Laconia, New Hampshire.
