= Kenneth Weyler =

American politician

Ken Weyler
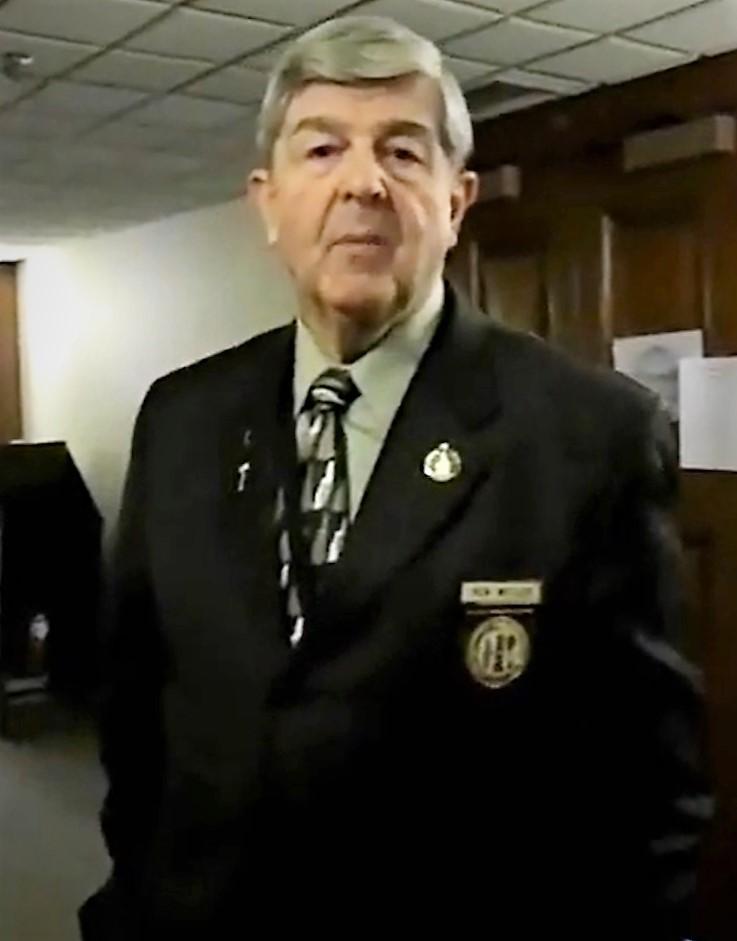
- Weyler interviewed in 2017

Member of the New Hampshire House of Representatives from the Rockingham 13th district
- Incumbent
- Assumed office December 1, 2010
- In office December 5, 1990 – December 3, 2008

Personal details
- Born: October 18, 1941 (age 84) Boston, Massachusetts, U.S.
- Party: Republican
- Education: Massachusetts Institute of Technology
- Occupation: retired pilot

Kenneth Weyler (born October 18, 1941) is an American politician in the state of New Hampshire. He is a member of the New Hampshire House of Representatives, sitting as a Republican from the Rockingham 13 district, having been first elected in 2010. He previously served from 1990 to 2008. He currently serves as Chair of the House Finance Committee.

== Controversies ==
=== Anti-mask document reaction (September 2020) ===
In September 2020, Woolf obtained and reported that Weyler posted or shared a document online opposing mask mandates and COVID-19 public health guidance. Coverage by WMUR noted that the document included criticism of government responses to the pandemic and was circulated by Weyler on his social media platforms. The response from other Republican lawmakers was mixed, with some defending his right to share the document and others distancing themselves from the content.

=== COVID-19 conspiracy comments (February 2021) ===
In February 2021, reporting by HuffPost and covered by other outlets described Weyler posting or promoting coronavirus-related conspiracy content on social media. The article reported that Weyler shared links and commentary related to unfounded theories about the origins of COVID-19, including claims connecting the pandemic to controversial narratives circulating online. Weyler later defended his statements as part of questioning official accounts, and his social media activity sparked debate within New Hampshire political circles about elected officials and public health messaging.

=== Resignation as chair of House Finance committees (October 2021) ===
In October 2021, Weyler resigned as chairman of the House Finance Committee and the Joint Fiscal Committee amid controversy over his membership in the New Hampshire Republican Party's House leadership and internal party tensions. According to the New Hampshire Bulletin, he stepped down after disagreements within the party about budgeting priorities and his leadership approach. Weyler stated that he believed the committees would be better served under new leadership and expressed confidence in his colleagues moving forward.

=== Youth Development Center victim settlement comments ===
In early 2025, Weyler drew widespread bipartisan criticism for comments he made about victims of sexual and physical abuse at the state's Youth Development Center. During a House Finance Division hearing, Weyler, who chairs the House Finance Committee, questioned the amount of money the state had set aside to compensate victims and suggested without evidence that individuals who were abused might have brought the abuse on themselves or would misuse settlement funds. His remarks were condemned by lawmakers from both parties and advocacy groups, with some calling for him to recuse himself from matters involving the settlement fund.

Weyler subsequently issued a written apology, acknowledging that his comments were insensitive and stating that victim-blaming has no place in discussions about the abuse claims, while also reiterating concerns about the fiscal impact of the settlements.

=== Public apology to Lucy Weber ===
In May 2024, Weyler issued a public apology to fellow state Representative Lucy Weber after interrupting her remarks on the House floor and making personal comments. According to reporting by WMUR, Weyler acknowledged that his behavior had breached legislative decorum and said he regretted the incident. The remarks drew attention from other lawmakers and highlighted expectations of conduct among House members.

=== School board comments ===
In May 2025, during a debate over legislation to expand New Hampshire's Education Freedom Account program, Weyler described local school boards as “corrupt,” arguing that they had failed to improve student performance and discipline. His remarks came in the context of discussions about educational costs and school choice. Other lawmakers objected to his characterization, and the New Hampshire School Boards Association responded that locally elected board members work diligently on behalf of students and communities.
