= Matthew Simon (politician) =

American politician

Member of the New Hampshire House of Representatives from the Grafton 14th district
- In office 2020 – December 7, 2022

Member of the New Hampshire House of Representatives from the Grafton 1st district
- Incumbent
- Assumed office December 7, 2022

Personal details
- Party: Republican

Matthew Simon is an American politician. He serves as a Republican member for the Grafton 1st district of the New Hampshire House of Representatives.
