= Terry Roy =

American politician

Terry W. Roy

Member of the New Hampshire House of Representatives from the Rockingham 31 district
- Incumbent
- Assumed office December 5, 2018

Personal details
- Born: December 28, 1968 (age 57) Gardner, Massachusetts, U.S.
- Party: Republican

Military service
- Branch/service: United States Army
- Years of service: 1985–1991
- Rank: Specialist
- Unit: 3rd Armored Division; V Corps
- Battles/wars: Gulf War

Terry W. Roy (born December 28, 1968) is an American politician, United States Army veteran, and former law-enforcement and regulatory investigator. A member of the Republican Party, he has served in the New Hampshire House of Representatives since 2018 and has chaired the House Criminal Justice and Public Safety Committee since 2023.

Roy represented Rockingham District 32 from 2018 until legislative redistricting in 2022, after which he began representing the two-member Rockingham District 31. His legislative work has focused largely on criminal justice and public safety, veterans and military families, policing, bail policy, and firearms legislation.

== Early life, military service and professional career ==
Roy was born on December 28, 1968, in Gardner, Massachusetts.

He served in the United States Army from 1985 to 1991 and attained the rank of specialist. Roy served with the 3rd Armored Division and V Corps and served during the Gulf War.

Roy holds a B.A. in criminal justice.

Before entering politics, Roy worked for several decades in law enforcement, security, regulatory compliance, and investigations. Vote Smart lists his professional experience as including work as an international security agent for American Airlines, a police officer in Gardner, a corporate compliance manager, and an investigations manager for the Massachusetts Department of Education. His official legislative biography describes him as having more than 30 years of experience in criminal and regulatory law enforcement, including service as both a uniformed officer and an investigator.

Roy later settled in Deerfield, New Hampshire, where he has also served in local government.

== Political career ==
=== New Hampshire House of Representatives ===
Roy was first elected to the New Hampshire House of Representatives in November 2018. Running as a Republican in Rockingham District 32, he defeated Democrat Tom Chase by 4,613 votes to 3,883.

He was reelected in 2020, defeating Democratic candidate Hal Rafter by 6,928 votes to 4,727.

Following the 2022 redistricting of the New Hampshire House, Roy ran in the two-member Rockingham District 31. He and fellow Republican Jess Edwards won the district's two seats, with Roy receiving 5,899 votes.

Roy was reelected in 2024 with 7,397 votes. Edwards received 8,166 votes, while Democratic candidates Charlotte Lister and David DePuy received 4,641 and 4,425 votes, respectively.

Rockingham District 31 covers Auburn, Candia, Chester, and Deerfield.

=== Committee leadership and other public service ===
Roy previously served as vice chairman of the House Executive Departments and Administration Committee and as vice chairman of the Criminal Justice and Public Safety Committee.

In December 2022, House Speaker Sherman Packard appointed Roy chairman of the Criminal Justice and Public Safety Committee for the 2023–2024 legislative term. He remained chairman during the 2025–2026 legislative term.

The committee's jurisdiction includes the criminal code, corrections, sentencing, drug enforcement, bail, probation and parole, driving while intoxicated, domestic violence, firearms and fireworks, police and fire training, and victims' assistance.

Roy has served multiple terms on Deerfield's municipal budget committee. He has served as chairman of the committee and currently serves as its vice chairman.

He also serves as chairman of the New Hampshire House Veterans' Interests Caucus.

Roy was appointed to the New Hampshire Law Enforcement Accreditation Commission, where he has served as a representative of the House of Representatives.

In 2025, Roy sponsored House Bill 777, which codified the New Hampshire Law Enforcement Accreditation Commission in state law. The measure became law as Chapter 51.

In March 2025, Governor Kelly Ayotte appointed Roy to the Governor's Highway Safety Task Force, established to examine traffic fatalities, speeding, impaired and distracted driving, wrong-way driving, and other highway-safety issues.

== Legislative activity ==
=== Criminal justice and policing ===
==== Laurie List ====
Roy co-authored 2021 legislation concerning New Hampshire's exculpatory evidence schedule, commonly known as the Laurie List. The list identifies law-enforcement officers with potential credibility issues that may need to be disclosed to criminal defendants and existed before Roy entered the legislature.

House Bill 471 established procedures governing the maintenance and disclosure of the exculpatory evidence schedule and created a process through which officers could challenge their inclusion.

Governor Chris Sununu signed the legislation in August 2021.

The state publicly released the list in 2022. New Hampshire Public Radio described Roy as a co-author of the legislation that paved the way for its release.

==== Bail reform ====
Roy played a leading role in the House's consideration of changes to New Hampshire's bail laws. In 2024, Roy and Democratic committee clerk Alissandra Murray worked on a bipartisan compromise contained in House Bill 318. The legislation addressed detention of defendants accused of certain violent crimes, created judicial magistrate positions, funded a statewide bail-tracking system, expanded victim-notification provisions, and made other changes to the state's bail system.

Roy served as a House conferee on the final version. Sununu signed House Bill 318 on August 1, 2024, as Chapter 317.

In 2025, Roy supported House Bill 592, a further overhaul that lowered the legal standard for detaining certain defendants before trial and gave judges greater discretion in pretrial detention decisions.

Roy offered a floor amendment that was adopted by the House. Ayotte signed the bill on March 25, 2025, as Chapter 3.

==== Death penalty ====
In 2026, Roy opposed legislation that would have reinstated the death penalty in New Hampshire. The Criminal Justice and Public Safety Committee unanimously recommended rejection of the legislation.

In the committee report, Roy cited testimony opposing reinstatement and concerns about the possibility of wrongful convictions. The House subsequently rejected the proposal.

==== Doxing legislation ====
Roy was the prime sponsor of House Bill 1367 in 2026, which would have created criminal penalties for certain forms of doxing.

The Criminal Justice and Public Safety Committee recommended passage by a 12–0 vote. The House later laid the bill on the table, and it died on the table at the end of the 2026 session.

=== Veterans and military families ===
Veterans and military-family issues have been a recurring focus of Roy's legislative work.

In 2020, Roy and Representative Judy Aron sponsored House Bill 1582, which was introduced as legislation establishing free tuition at New Hampshire public colleges and universities for children of veterans who are totally and permanently disabled. The Senate expanded the measure into an omnibus veterans bill addressing employment, housing, health care, higher education, National Guard educational assistance, and other veterans-related matters. Sununu signed the legislation on July 28, 2020, as Chapter 34.

In 2022, Roy sponsored House Bill 1575, which expanded the tuition-waiver program to qualifying children of deceased veterans who had been totally and permanently disabled as a result of a service-connected disability. The measure passed both chambers without opposition and was signed by Sununu on April 18, 2022.

Roy also sponsored House Bill 1653 in 2022, an omnibus measure concerning educational and employment protections for military families. Among its provisions were protections involving school enrollment for military-connected children, temporary occupational licensing for qualifying service members and spouses, and continuation of in-state tuition status in specified circumstances. The bill became law as Chapter 310.

In 2025, Roy was the prime sponsor of House Bill 64, which extended certain state hiring and purchasing preferences to military spouses and active-duty military personnel. Ayotte signed the measure on June 23, 2025, as Chapter 107.

In 2026, Roy sponsored House Bill 1366 concerning military protective orders. The measure requires law-enforcement officers who have probable cause to believe a member of the armed forces has violated a military protective order to notify the appropriate military or law-enforcement authority. The Criminal Justice and Public Safety Committee recommended the bill 13–0, and Ayotte signed it on May 22, 2026, as Chapter 85.

=== Firearms policy ===
Roy has been described in New Hampshire news coverage as a Second Amendment and gun-rights advocate.

Following the November 2023 shooting at New Hampshire Hospital, in which security officer Bradley Haas was killed, Roy was the prime sponsor of House Bill 1711. The legislation would have authorized New Hampshire to report records involving certain court-ordered mental-health commitments for use in federal firearm background checks and created procedures relating to firearm possession following certain mental-health court proceedings.

The bill passed the House 204–149, with 25 Republican representatives joining Democrats in support. The Senate later laid the bill on the table, and it died on the table when the 2024 session ended.

Roy introduced a revised proposal, House Bill 159, in 2025. The House laid that bill on the table in March 2025, and it died on the table at the end of the session.

In 2025, Roy proposed requiring one hour of age-appropriate firearm-safety education each year for students in New Hampshire public schools. The proposal called for younger students to be taught to avoid firearms and report them to adults, while older students would receive additional firearm-safety instruction. It prohibited the use of live firearms or ammunition in classrooms and allowed parents to opt their children out.

Roy introduced the proposal as House Bill 1830 in 2026. The House Education Policy and Administration Committee unanimously recommended that the bill be considered inexpedient to legislate by a 17–0 vote, and the House rejected the bill by voice vote on February 12, 2026.

=== Gender-affirming care legislation ===
Roy was the lead sponsor of House Bill 619, introduced in 2023. As introduced, the legislation proposed restrictions concerning gender-affirming medical treatment for minors and included provisions relating to conversion therapy, student names and pronouns, bathrooms, and school athletics.

The proposal drew opposition from medical providers, LGBTQ advocacy organizations, and members of the public. The legislature substantially narrowed the bill during the legislative process.

The final version prohibited physicians from performing specified genital gender-reassignment surgeries on people under 18 while providing exceptions for specified medically indicated procedures. Sununu signed the bill on July 19, 2024, as Chapter 213, and it took effect on January 1, 2025.

=== Impaired driving ===
Roy was the prime sponsor of House Bill 776 in 2025. The legislation made wrong-way driving an aggravating factor in certain aggravated-driving-while-intoxicated cases. The legislature passed the measure and Ayotte signed it into law as Chapter 290.

== Electoral history ==
New Hampshire House of Representatives general elections
Year	District	Candidate	Party	Votes	%	Result
2018	Rockingham 32	Terry Roy	Republican	4,613	54.3%	Elected
2018	Rockingham 32	Tom Chase	Democratic	3,883	45.7%	Defeated
2020	Rockingham 32	Terry Roy	Republican	6,928	59.4%	Reelected
2020	Rockingham 32	Hal Rafter	Democratic	4,727	40.5%	Defeated
2022	Rockingham 31 (two seats)	Jess Edwards	Republican	6,087	31.0%	Elected
2022	Rockingham 31 (two seats)	Terry Roy	Republican	5,899	30.1%	Elected
2022	Rockingham 31 (two seats)	Charlotte Lister	Democratic	3,884	19.8%	Defeated
2022	Rockingham 31 (two seats)	William A. Thomas	Democratic	3,759	19.1%	Defeated
2024	Rockingham 31 (two seats)	Jess Edwards	Republican	8,166	33.1%	Reelected
2024	Rockingham 31 (two seats)	Terry Roy	Republican	7,397	30.0%	Reelected
2024	Rockingham 31 (two seats)	Charlotte Lister	Democratic	4,641	18.8%	Defeated
2024	Rockingham 31 (two seats)	David DePuy	Democratic	4,425	18.0%	Defeated
