= Jason Quinno =

American politician

Member-elect of the New Hampshire House of Representatives from the Merrimack 30th district
- Assuming office December 2026
- Succeeding: Gary Woods

Personal details
- Party: Democratic

Jason Quinno is an American politician. A member of the Democratic Party, he is the member-elect for the Merrimack 30th district of the New Hampshire House of Representatives.
