= Cody York =

American politician

Member-elect of the New Hampshire House of Representatives from the Merrimack 4th district
- Assuming office December 2026
- Succeeding: Jose Cambrils

Personal details
- Party: Democratic

Cody York is an American politician. A member of the Democratic Party, he is the member-elect for the Merrimack 4th district of the New Hampshire House of Representatives.
