= Pierre DuPont =

Pierre DuPont may refer to:

- Pierre DuPont (carpet maker) (1560–1640), founder of French carpet making
- Pierre Samuel du Pont de Nemours (1739–1817), French-American entrepreneur and founder of the du Pont family dynasty
- Pierre Dupont de l'Étang (1765–1840), French general
- Pierre Dupont (1821–1870), French songwriter
- Pierre S. du Pont (1870–1954), Du Pont Company and General Motors executive
- Pierre S. du Pont IV (born 1935), American lawyer and politician, Governor of Delaware
- Pierre Dupont (New Hampshire politician)
- Pierre Dupont (Tomb Raider), fictional character from the Tomb Raider video game series
