= Kate Cook (politician) =

American politician

Member-elect of the New Hampshire House of Representatives from the Rockingham 37th district
- Assuming office December 2026
- Succeeding: David Meuse

Personal details
- Party: Democratic

Kate Cook is an American politician. A member of the Democratic Party, she is the member-elect for the Rockingham 37th district of the New Hampshire House of Representatives.
