= Kimberly Abare =

American politician

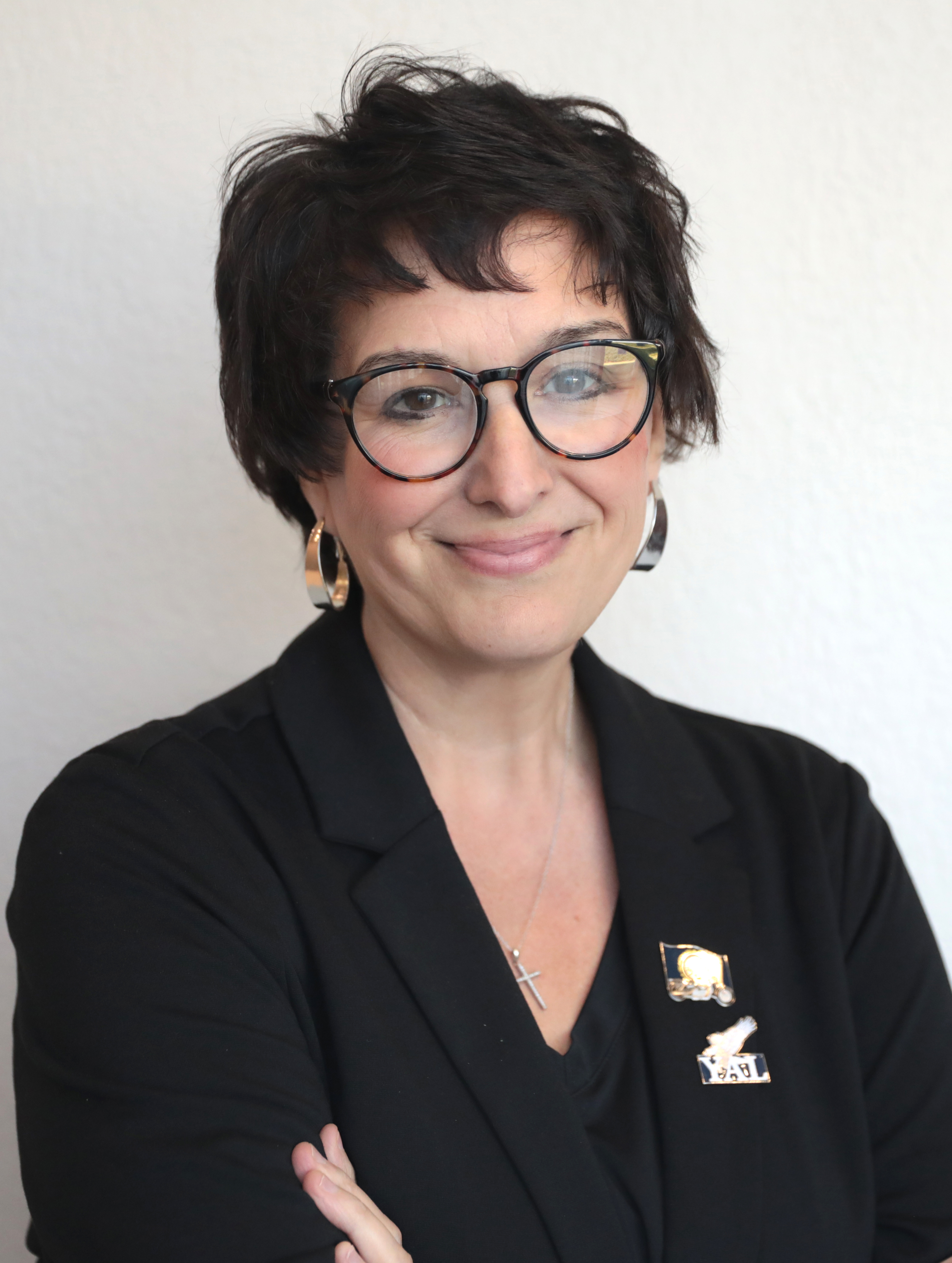
- Abare in 2022

Member of the New Hampshire House of Representatives from the Hillsborough 1st district
- In office December 7, 2022 – December 4, 2024
- Succeeded by: Tim Mannion

Personal details
- Party: Republican

Kimberly Abare is an American politician and businesswoman. She served as a Republican member for the Hillsborough 1st district of the New Hampshire House of Representatives from 2022 to 2024. She is also the president of New England Die Cutting, LLC, and co-owns a commercial real estate business.

In 2025, New Hampshire Governor Kelly Ayotte appointed Abare to the Commission on Government Efficiency or "COGE", a commission tasked with cutting spending by the New Hampshire government. COGE is modeled on the Department of Government Efficiency, doing similar work at the federal level.
