= Amber Schaefer =

American politician

Member-elect of the New Hampshire House of Representatives from the Belknap 1st district
- Assuming office December 2026
- Succeeding: Tom Ploszaj

Personal details
- Party: Democratic

Amber Schaefer is an American politician. A member of the Democratic Party, she is the member-elect for the Belknap 1st district of the New Hampshire House of Representatives.
