= Will Hurley =

American politician

Member-elect of the New Hampshire House of Representatives from the Strafford 12th district
- Assuming office December 2026
- Succeeding: John Stone

Personal details
- Party: Democratic

Will Hurley is an American politician. A member of the Democratic Party, he is the member-elect for the Strafford 12th district of the New Hampshire House of Representatives.
