= John Scully (politician) =

American politician

Member-elect of the New Hampshire House of Representatives from the Rockingham 5th district
- Assuming office December 2026
- Succeeding: Michael Vose

Personal details
- Party: Republican

John Scully is an American politician. A member of the Republican Party, he is the member-elect for the Rockingham 5th district of the New Hampshire House of Representatives.
