= Rick Faulconer =

American politician

Member-elect of the New Hampshire House of Representatives from the Rockingham 20th district
- Assuming office December 2026
- Succeeding: Charles Melvin

Personal details
- Party: Democratic

Rick Faulconer is an American politician. A member of the Democratic Party, he is the member-elect for the Rockingham 20th district of the New Hampshire House of Representatives.
