= Anna Howard (politician) =

American politician

Member-elect of the New Hampshire House of Representatives from the Rockingham 21st district
- Assuming office December 2, 2026
- Succeeding: Jennifer Mandelbaum (elect)

Personal details
- Party: Democratic
- Education: University of Massachusetts Amherst; Clark University
- Website: Official website

Anna Howard is an American politician serving as a member of the New Hampshire House of Representatives from the Rockingham 21st district. She was elected unopposed in 2026. She represents Portsmouth, New Hampshire. She graduated from University of Massachusetts Amherst and Clark University.
