= Pauline Martineau =

American politician

Member-elect of the New Hampshire House of Representatives from the Hillsborough 20th district
- Assuming office December 2026
- Succeeding: Pierre Dupont

Personal details
- Party: Democratic

Pauline Martineau is an American politician. A member of the Democratic Party, she is the member-elect for the Hillsborough 20th district of the New Hampshire House of Representatives.
