= William Lawrence Jr. =

American politician

Member-elect of the New Hampshire House of Representatives from the Belknap 3rd district
- Assuming office December 2026
- Succeeding: Juliet Harvey-Bolia

Personal details
- Party: Democratic

William Lawrence Jr. is an American politician. A member of the Democratic Party, he is the member-elect for the Belknap 3rd district of the New Hampshire House of Representatives.
