= Samantha Fox (disambiguation) =

Samantha Fox (born 1966) is an English singer and former glamour model.

Samantha Fox may also refer to:

- Samantha Fox (American actress) (1950–2020), pornographic and B movie actress
- Samantha Fox (politician), American politician
- Samantha Fox (album), an album by the English singer
