= Cam Kenney =

American politician

Member of the New Hampshire House of Representatives from the Strafford 6th district
- In office December 5, 2018 – December 4, 2024
- Succeeded by: Wayne Burton

Personal details
- Party: Democratic
- Education: University of New Hampshire

Cam Kenney is a New Hampshire politician.

== Education ==
Kenney graduated from Avon Middle High School in 2014.

He graduated from the University of New Hampshire in 2018.

== Career ==
On November 6, 2018, Kenney was elected to the New Hampshire House of Representatives where he represents the Strafford 6 district. Kenney assumed office on December 5, 2018. Kenney is a Democrat. Kenney endorsed Bernie Sanders in the 2020 Democratic Party presidential primaries.

== Personal life ==
Kenney was born January 29, 1996. He grew up in Avon Massachusetts. He has three siblings: Nicole Kenney, Melissa Kenney, and John Kenney. His parents are divorced.

Kenney resides in Durham, New Hampshire.
