= Joan Hamblet =

American politician

Member of the New Hampshire House of Representatives from the Rockingham 31st district
- In office 2020 – December 7, 2022

Member-elect of the New Hampshire House of Representatives from the Rockingham 26th district
- Assuming office December 7, 2022
- Succeeding: Buzz Scherr (elect)

Personal details
- Party: Democratic

Joan Hamblet is an American politician. She serves as a Democratic member for the Rockingham 26th district of the New Hampshire House of Representatives.
