= Kesselring =

Kesselring is a German surname. Notable people with the surname include:

- Albert Kesselring (1885–1960), German field marshal
- Joseph Kesselring (1902–1967), American playwright
- Michael Kesselring (born 2000), American ice hockey player
- Steven Kesselring (active from 2024), American politician
