= Siena Schaier =

American politician

Member-elect of the New Hampshire House of Representatives from the Strafford 10th district
- Assuming office December 2026
- Succeeding: Marjorie Smith

Personal details
- Party: Democratic

Siena Schaier is an American politician. A member of the Democratic Party, she is the member-elect for the Strafford 10th district of the New Hampshire House of Representatives.
