= Jeffrey Kerr =

American politician

Member-elect of the New Hampshire House of Representatives from the Hillsborough 2nd district
- Assuming office December 2026
- Succeeding: Brian Labrie

Personal details
- Party: Democratic

Jeffrey Kerr is an American politician. A member of the Democratic Party, he is the member-elect for the Hillsborough 2nd district of the New Hampshire House of Representatives.
