= Kathryn Brennan =

American politician

Member-elect of the New Hampshire House of Representatives from the Grafton 14th district
- Assuming office December 2026
- Succeeding: George Sykes

Personal details
- Party: Democratic

Kathryn Brennan is an American politician. A member of the Democratic Party, she is the member-elect for the Grafton 14th district of the New Hampshire House of Representatives.
