= William Friel =

American politician

Member of New Hampshire House of Representatives for Rockingham 14
- In office 2012 – December 4, 2018
- Succeeded by: Robert Harb

Personal details
- Party: Republican

William Friel is an American politician. He was a member of the New Hampshire House of Representatives and represented Rockingham 14th district from 2012 to 2018.
