= Gary Woods =

Gary Woods may refer to:

- Gary Woods (baseball) (1954–2015), American professional baseball player
- Gary Woods (footballer) (born 1990), English footballer
- Gary Woods (politician) (fl. 2010s–2020s), American politician
- Gary Woods (The Bear), also known as Sweeps, a fictional character on the FX Network television series The Bear
