= Gary Matteson =

American politician

Gary Matterson

Member-elect of the New Hampshire House of Representatives from the Merrimack 14th district
- Assuming office December 2026
- Succeeding: Dan McGuire

Personal details
- Party: Republican

Gary Matteson is an American politician. A member of the Republican Party, he is the member-elect for the Merrimack 14th district of the New Hampshire House of Representatives.
