= Riché Colcombe =

American politician

Member of the New Hampshire House of Representatives from the Hillsborough 30th district
- Incumbent
- Assumed office December 2022

Personal details
- Party: Republican
- Education: Springfield Technical Community College
- Committees: Labor, Industrial and Rehabilitative Services
- Website: https://www.congressweb.com/tsepublicresources/legislators/info/mbr_id/5154/

Riché Colcombe is an American politician in the New Hampshire House of Representatives. She is one of three representatives from Hillsborough 30 covering Hillsborough and Bennington. She was first elected in 2022.

== Election history ==
Republican primary for New Hampshire House of Representatives Hillsborough 38 (2 seats), 2020
Party	Candidate	Votes	%
Republican	Jim Creighton	2,064	58.1%
Republican	Riche Colcombe	1,483	41.7%
Republican	Write in	6	0.2%

General election for New Hampshire House of Representatives Hillsborough 38 (2 seats), 2020
Party	Candidate	Votes	%
Republican	Jim Creighton	6,520	26.5%
Democratic	Stephanie Hyland	6,161	25.0%
Republican	Riche Colcombe	6,091	24.7%
Democratic	James Bosman	5,851	23.8%
Other	Write in	3	0.0%

Republican primary for New Hampshire House of Representatives Hillsborough 30 (3 seats), 2022
Party	Candidate	Votes	%
Republican	Jim Creighton	721	35.9%
Republican	Riche Colcombe	665	33.2%
Republican	Jim Fedolfi	620	30.9%

General election for New Hampshire House of Representatives Hillsborough 30 (3 seats), 2022
Party	Candidate	Votes	%
Republican	Jim Creighton	2,277	18.5%
Republican	Riche Colcombe	2,268	18.4%
Republican	Jim Fedolfi	2,064	16.8%
Democratic	Peter J. Koutroubas	1,944	15.8%
Democratic	Jonathan Manley	1,930	15.7%
Democratic	Ckristopher Wallenstein	1,809	14.7%
Other	Write-in	2	0.0%
