= Michael Moody =

American politician

Member-elect of the New Hampshire House of Representatives from the Rockingham 24th district
- Assuming office December 2026
- Succeeding: Jaci Grote

Personal details
- Party: Democratic

Michael Moody is an American politician. A member of the Democratic Party, he is the member-elect for the Rockingham 24th district of the New Hampshire House of Representatives.
