= Michael Vose =

Member of the New Hampshire House of Representatives from the Rockingham 5th district
- In office December 7, 2022 – August 27, 2026 Serving with Mark Vallone
- Preceded by: Multi-member district
- Succeeded by: John Scully (elect)

Member of the New Hampshire House of Representatives from the Rockingham 9th district
- In office October 9, 2019 – December 7, 2022 Serving with Mark Vallone (2019–2020), Cody M. Belanger (2020–2022)
- Preceded by: Sean D. Morrison
- Succeeded by: Chris True; Tony Piemonte
- In office December 3, 2014 – December 5, 2018 Serving with Jeffrey F. Harris (2014–2016), Sean D. Morrison (2016–2018)
- Preceded by: Barbara Helmstetter
- Succeeded by: Mark Vallone

Personal details
- Party: Republican
- Education: Keene State College (BA); University of Maine (MA)

Michael Vose is an American politician. He served as a Republican member for the Rockingham 5th district of the New Hampshire House of Representatives. While in the legislature he served as the chair of the Science, Technology and Energy Committee.

== Personal life ==
Vose resides in Epping, New Hampshire. Vose received a Bachelor of Arts in History from Keene State College. Vose received a Master of Arts in Public Administration from the University of Maine in 1975.

== Political career ==
Vose served on the Peterborough Budget Committee from 1984 to 1989, as an Epping Library Trustee from 2012 to 2015, and has been on the Epping Planning Board since 2018. Vose served in the New Hampshire House of Representatives from 2014 to 2018 and from 2019 to 2026. Vose currently represents the Rockingham 5th district. He served as the chair of the Science, Technology and Energy Committee. He resigned his seat in the New Hampshire House of Representatives on August 27, 2026.
