= Jim Normand =

American politician

Member-elect of the New Hampshire House of Representatives from the Hillsborough 18th district
- Assuming office December 2026
- Succeeding: Steven Kesselring

Personal details
- Party: Democratic

Jim Normand is an American politician. A member of the Democratic Party, he is the member-elect for the Hillsborough 18th district of the New Hampshire House of Representatives.
