= Lorrie Carey =

American politician

Member of the New Hampshire House of Representatives from the Merrimack 26th district
- In office 2012–2014

Member of the New Hampshire House of Representatives from the Merrimack 1st district
- In office December 7, 2022 – December 4, 2024
- Preceded by: Louise Andrus (redistricting)
- Succeeded by: Ricky Devoid

Personal details
- Born: Concord, New Hampshire
- Party: Democratic
- Education: University of North Carolina at Greensboro

Lorrie Carey is an American politician. She served as a Democratic member for the Merrimack 1st district of the New Hampshire House of Representatives from 2022 until 2024, having previously served for the Merrimack 26th district from 2012 until 2014.

Carey currently serves as a Member of the Select Board of the Town of Boscawen, New Hampshire.
