= Mike Pellerito =

American politician

Member-elect of the New Hampshire House of Representatives from the Hillsborough 36th district
- Assuming office December 2026
- Succeeding: Diane Pauer

Personal details
- Party: Democratic

Mike Pellerito is an American politician. A member of the Democratic Party, he is the member-elect for the Hillsborough 36th district of the New Hampshire House of Representatives.

== Early life and career ==
Pellerito earned a Bachelor of Science in industrial and management engineering from Rensselaer Polytechnic Institute in 1994. He moved to New Hampshire in 1995 and has worked at BAE Systems in Nashua for more than 30 years, where he is a subcontract program manager. He served two terms on the Mascenic School Board. He is married to Brenda.

== Elections ==
In the 2026 general election, Pellerito won the first of two seats in Hillsborough 36, which covers Brookline, Greenville and Mason. He received 2,140 votes (25.7%), ahead of fellow Democrat Stephen Spratt with 2,112 votes (25.3%). The two Republican incumbents, Diane Pauer and John W. Suiter, received 2,094 and 1,996 votes respectively and were defeated. He is scheduled to take office on 2 December 2026, when the new legislature is sworn in on Organization Day.

Pellerito previously ran for the New Hampshire House in 2024, in Hillsborough 32, and lost, receiving 2,349 votes (12.9%).
