= Deirdre McEachern =

American politician

Member-elect of the New Hampshire House of Representatives from the Carroll 6th district
- Assuming office December 2026
- Succeeding: Katy Peternel

Personal details
- Party: Democratic

Deirdre McEachern is an American politician. A member of the Democratic Party, she is the member-elect for the Carroll 6th district of the New Hampshire House of Representatives.
