= John Stone (New Hampshire politician) =

American politician

Member of the New Hampshire House of Representatives from the Strafford 12th district
- Incumbent
- Assumed office December 4, 2024
- Succeeded by: Will Hurley (elect)

Personal details
- Party: Democratic

John Joseph Stone is a member of the New Hampshire House of Representatives, representing Strafford-012. He is a Democrat.
