= Jose Cambrils =

American politician

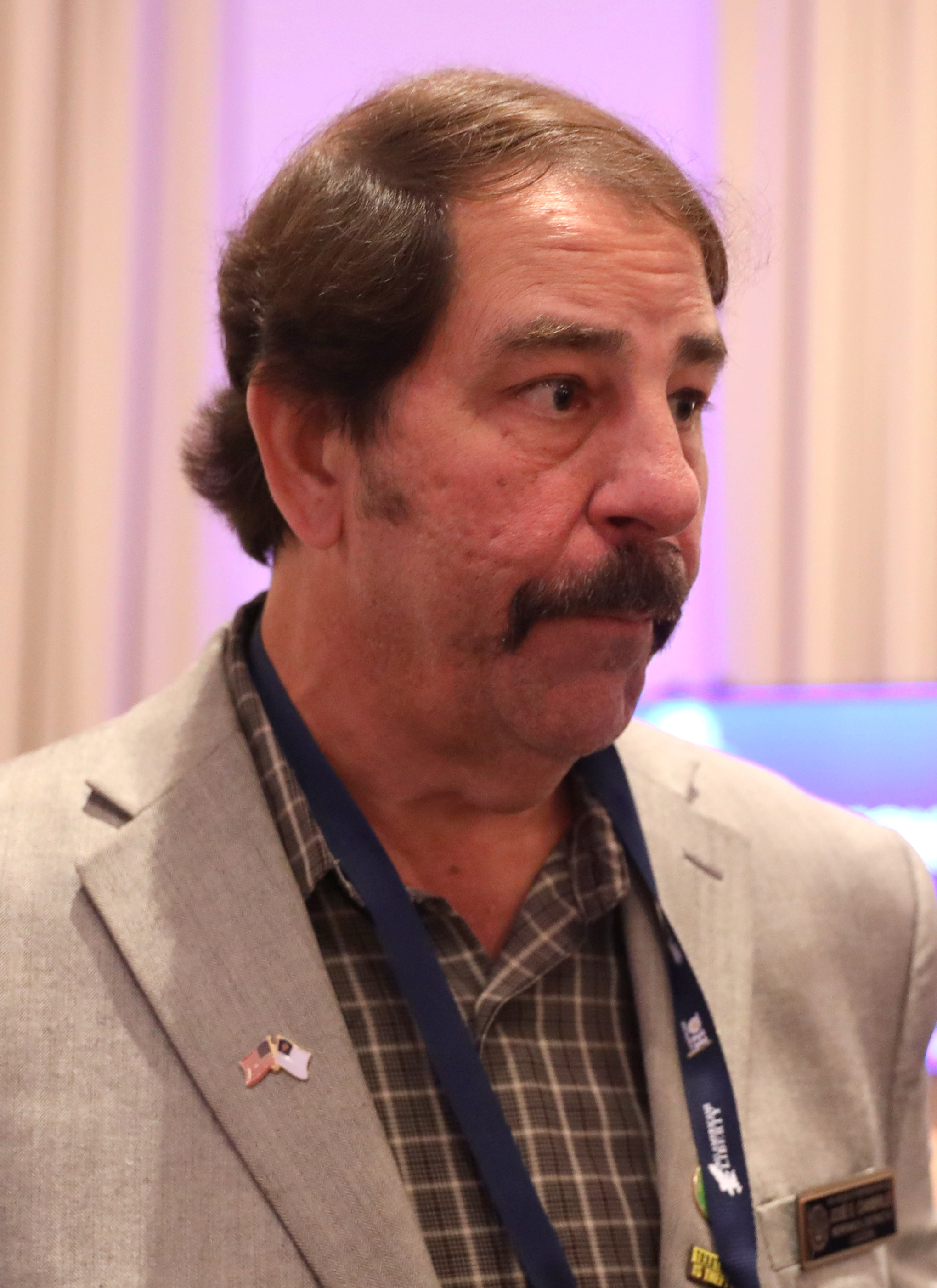

Member of the New Hampshire House of Representatives from the Merrimack 9th district
- In office 2020 – December 7, 2022

Member of the New Hampshire House of Representatives from the Merrimack 4th district
- Incumbent
- Assumed office December 7, 2022
- Succeeded by: Cody York (elect)

Personal details
- Born: Las Tunas, Cuba
- Party: Republican

Jose Cambrils is an American politician. He serves as a Republican member for the Merrimack 4th district of the New Hampshire House of Representatives.
