= John Schneller (politician) =

American politician

Member of New Hampshire House of Representatives for Hillsborough 2
- Incumbent
- Assumed office December 4, 2024
- Succeeded by: Geoffrey Wellington (elect)

Personal details
- Born: August 25, 1965 (age 61) Boston Massachussttes
- Party: Republican
- Education: University of Massachusetts Amherst; Suffolk University
- Website: johnschneller.org/js/

John Schneller is an American politician. He is a member of the New Hampshire House of Representatives.

Schneller holds a BA from University of Massachusetts Amherst, an MBA from Cornell University, and an MPA from Suffolk University.
