= Marjorie Smith (American politician) =

American politician (born 1941)

Member of the New Hampshire House of Representatives from the Strafford 6th district
- Incumbent
- Assumed office December 2012
- Succeeded by: Siena Schaier (elect)
- In office December 1996 – December 2010

Personal details
- Born: February 22, 1941 (age 85) New York City, U.S.
- Party: Democratic
- Education: Beaver College

Marjorie Smith (born February 22, 1941) is an American politician in the state of New Hampshire. She is a member of the New Hampshire House of Representatives, sitting as a Democrat from the Strafford 6 district, having been first elected in 2012. She previously served from 1996 to 2010.
