= Laura Telerski =

American politician

Member of the New Hampshire House of Representatives from the Hillsborough 35th district
- In office 2018 – December 7, 2022

Member of the New Hampshire House of Representatives from the Hillsborough 11th district
- Incumbent
- Assumed office December 7, 2022
- Succeeded by: Arya Shams (elect)

Personal details
- Party: Democratic
- Education: Georgetown University (BA); University of Chicago (MA)

Laura Telerski is an American politician. She serves as a Democratic member for the Hillsborough 11th district of the New Hampshire House of Representatives.

In April 2025, Telerski announced her candidacy for the New Hampshire State Senate District 13.

== Personal life ==
Telerski resides in Nashua, New Hampshire. Telerski is married and has three children. Telerski received a BA in History from Georgetown University in 1993, and then a MA in Middle Eastern Studies from the University of Chicago in 1995.
