= Sherri Reinfurt =

American politician

Member of New Hampshire House of Representatives for Hillsborough 29
- Incumbent
- Assumed office December 4, 2024

Personal details
- Party: Republican

Sherri Reinfurt is an American politician. She is a member of the New Hampshire House of Representatives. Her district covers the town of Goffstown.
