= Claudine Burnham =

American politician

Member of the New Hampshire House of Representatives from the Strafford 2nd district
- Incumbent
- Assumed office December 7, 2022
- Succeeded by: Larry Brown (elect)

Personal details
- Party: Republican

Claudine Burnham is an American politician. She serves as a Republican member for the Strafford 2nd district of the New Hampshire House of Representatives.
