= Dick Thackston =

American politician

Member of the New Hampshire House of Representatives from the Cheshire 12th district
- Incumbent
- Assumed office December 7, 2022
- Succeeded by: Kristan Tilton (elect)

Personal details
- Party: Republican

Dick Thackston is an American politician. He serves as a Republican member for the Cheshire 12th district of the New Hampshire House of Representatives.
