= Katy Peternel =

American politician

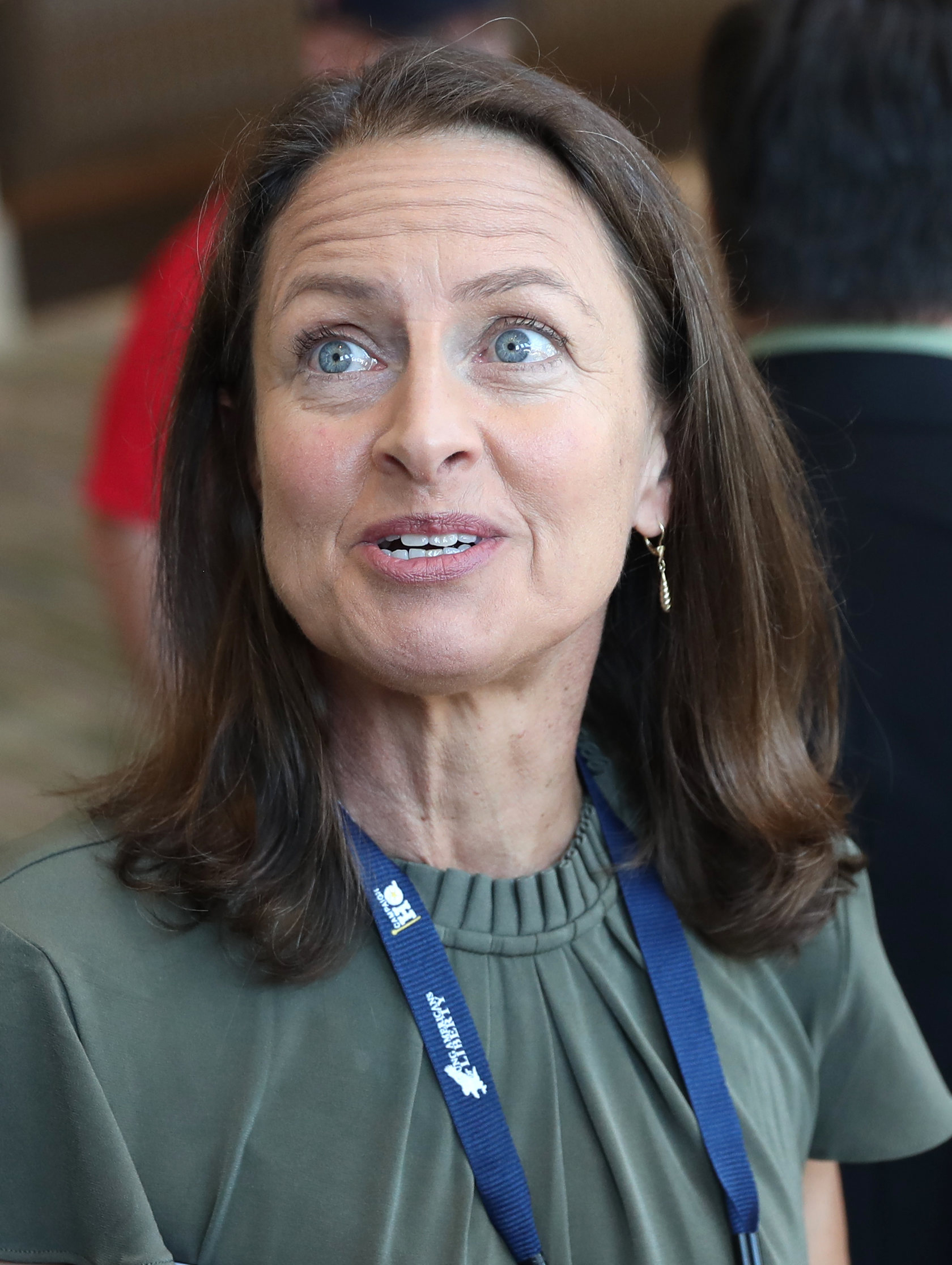

Member of the New Hampshire House of Representatives from the Carroll 6th district
- Incumbent
- Assumed office December 7, 2022
- Succeeded by: Deirdre McEachern (elect)

Personal details
- Party: Republican

Katy Peternel is an American politician. She serves as a Republican member for the Carroll 6th district of the New Hampshire House of Representatives.
