= Ron Dunn (politician) =

American politician

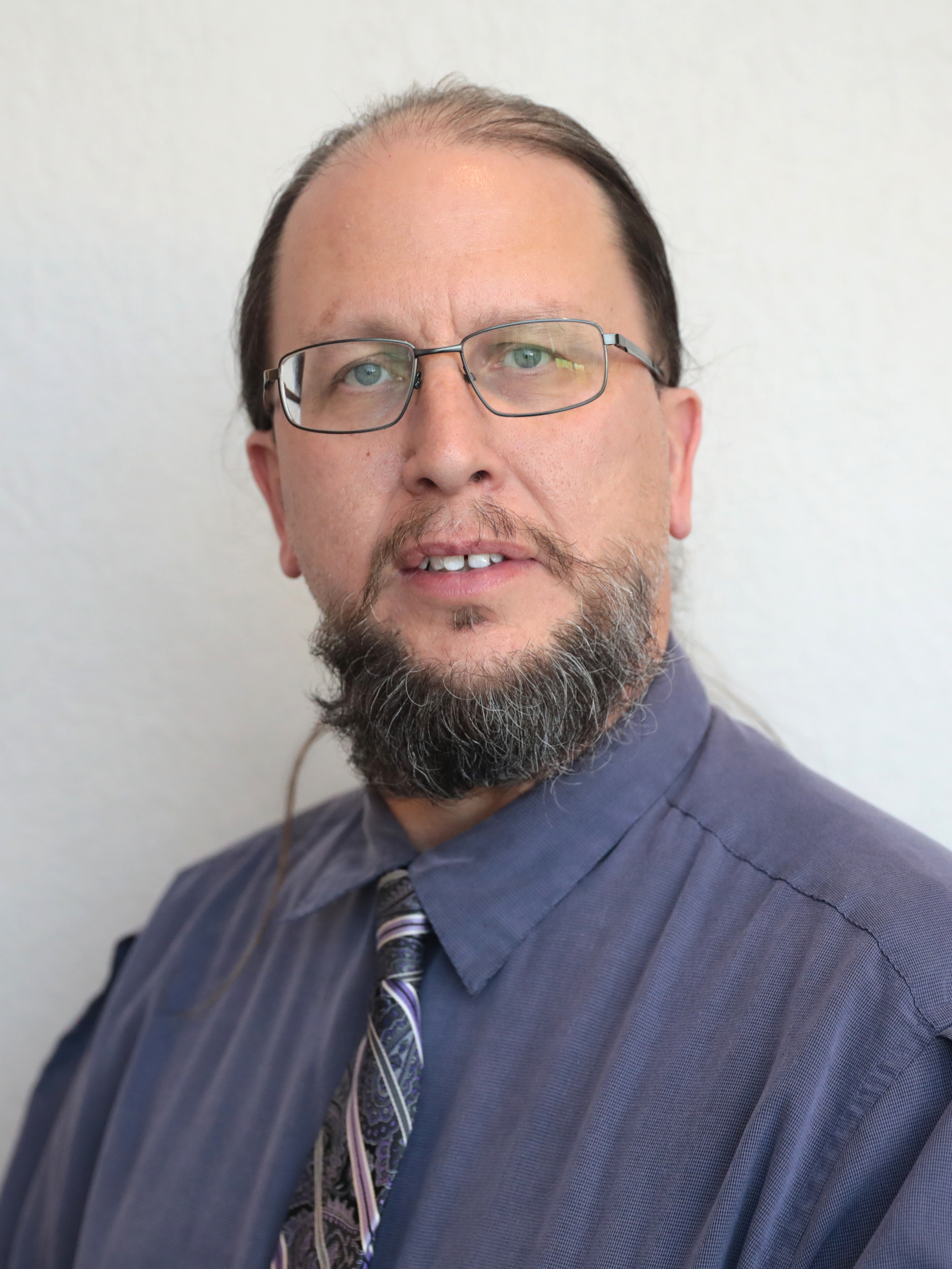
- Dunn in 2022

Member of the New Hampshire House of Representatives from the Rockingham 16th district
- Incumbent
- Assumed office December 7, 2022

Personal details
- Party: Republican

Ron Dunn is an American politician. He serves as a Republican member for the Rockingham 16th district of the New Hampshire House of Representatives.
