= Dan McGuire =

American politician

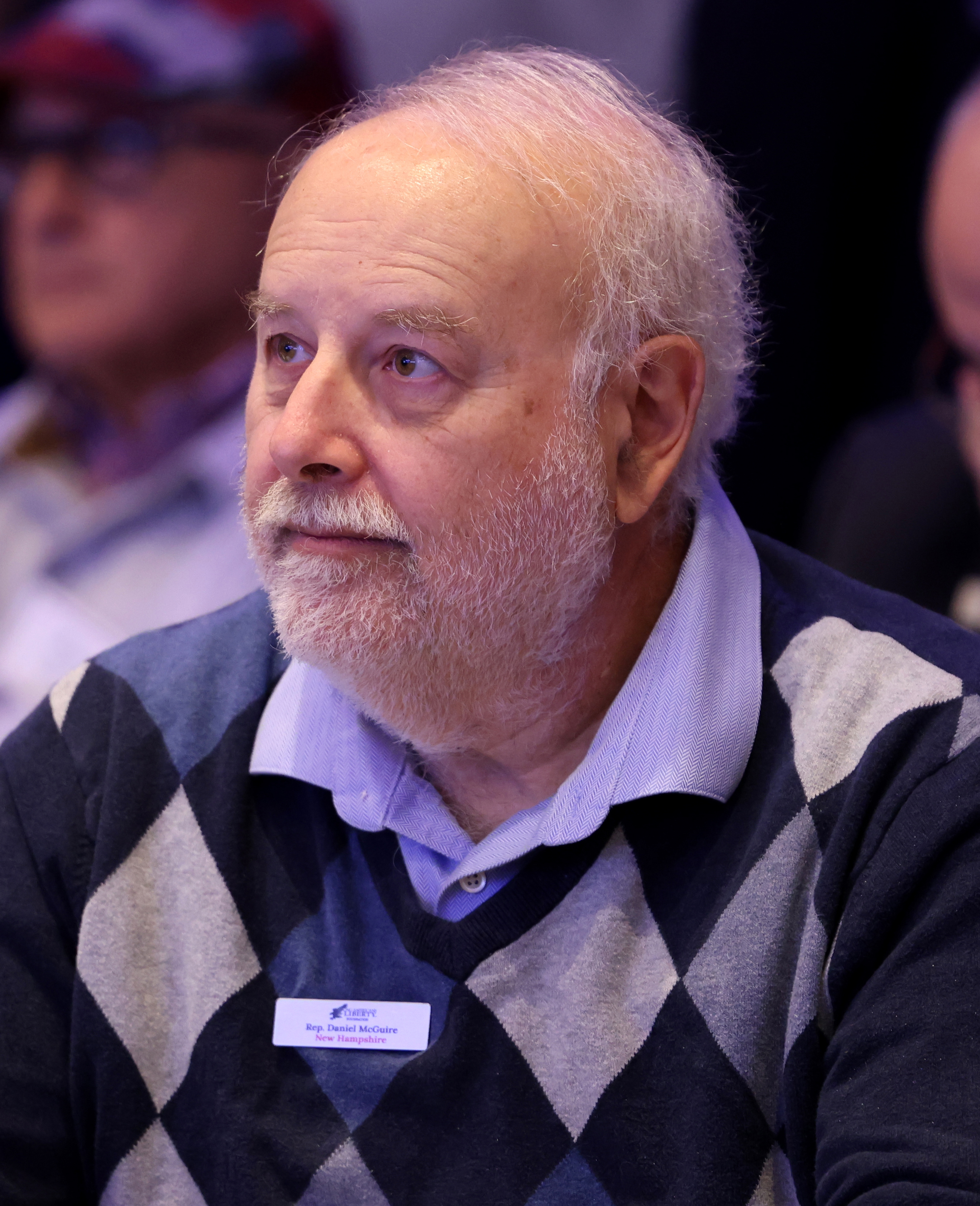
- McGuire at the 2024 Hazlitt Summit hosted by Young Americans for Liberty Foundation

Member of the New Hampshire House of Representatives from the Merrimack 8th district
- In office 2010–2012

Member of the New Hampshire House of Representatives from the Merrimack 21st district
- In office 2012–2016

Member of the New Hampshire House of Representatives from the Merrimack 14th district
- Incumbent
- Assumed office December 7, 2022
- Succeeded by: Gary Matteson (elect)

Personal details
- Party: Republican
- Spouse: Carol McGuire

Dan McGuire is an American politician. He serves as a Republican member for the Merrimack 14th district of the New Hampshire House of Representatives.

== Politics ==
=== Public Schools ===
In February 2025, McGuire attracted attention during debate over House Bill 283, a proposal that would remove several subject-area requirements from New Hampshire’s public school curriculum, including requirements related to special education instruction and services.

McGuire also introduced education-policy legislation that has generated debate, including a proposal to make school superintendents elected officials rather than appointed by local boards, a change that some educators and community members opposed.

== Controversy ==
In early February 2025, reporting from NHPR and the Concord Monitor detailed a dispute between McGuire and officials in the Epsom School District over his characterization of a conversation that helped inform one of his legislative proposals. McGuire testified that a private meeting with the school district administrator and principal was the “genesis” of his bill (HB 283) to eliminate a range of required subjects from New Hampshire public school curriculum. However, school officials said the discussion at the meeting (which McGuire had hosted at his home) did not involve those curriculum requirements and disagreed with his interpretation of their remarks. They said their intent had been to discuss funding concerns, not to advocate for eliminating specific subjects. Critics of the bill questioned whether McGuire had misrepresented the meeting’s content in advancing his proposal.
