= Karen Ebel =

American politician

Deputy Speaker of the New Hampshire House of Representatives
- In office December 2018 – December 2020
- Preceded by: Sherman Packard
- Succeeded by: Sherman Packard

Member of the New Hampshire House of Representatives
- Incumbent
- Assumed office December 5, 2012

Personal details
- Party: Democratic
- Education: Trinity College; Georgetown University (JD)

Karen Ebel is an American politician. She currently serves as a Democratic representative for the Merrimack 7th district of the New Hampshire House of Representatives. Ebel was the deputy speaker during the 2019-2020 biennium.

== Education and personal life ==
Ebel earned a degree from Trinity College in Vermont and a Juris Doctor from Georgetown University Law Center. Ebel resides in New London, New Hampshire.

== New Hampshire House of Representatives ==
Ebel currently serves as a Democratic member for the Merrimack 7th district of the New Hampshire House of Representatives. Ebel was first elected to the New Hampshire House of Representatives in 2012 for the Merrimack 5th district, the numbering for which was changed after the 2021 redistricting. Ebel currently serves as Minority Leader Pro Tempore. Ebel served as Deputy Speaker during the 2019-2020 biennium under Speaker Steve Shurtleff. She currently serves as the ranking member of the Special Committee on Commissions.

She has endorsed Cinde Warmington for governor in the 2024 New Hampshire Gubernatorial Election.

She endorsed Amy Klobuchar in the 2020 Democratic Presidential Primary.
