= Gaby Grossman =

American politician

Member of the New Hampshire House of Representatives from the Rockingham 18 district
- Incumbent
- Assumed office December 5, 2018
- Succeeded by: Enna Grazier (elect)

Personal details
- Born: Gabriella Smith
- Party: Democratic
- Education: Boston University (BA); Lesley University (MA)

Gaby Grossman is an American politician serving as a member of the New Hampshire House of Representatives from the Rockingham 18 district. She assumed office on December 5, 2018.

== Education ==
Grossman earned a Bachelor of Arts degree in history from Boston University and a Master of Arts in teaching from Lesley University.

== Career ==
From 2017 to 2020, Grossman was a resident artist at a gallery in Exeter, New Hampshire. She is the owner of the Ames Brook Campground in Ashland, New Hampshire. Grossman became interested in politics and activism after Barack Obama was elected in 2008. Grossman was elected to the New Hampshire House of Representatives in 2018. She serves as a member of the House Children and Family Law Committee. During the 2020 Democratic Party presidential primaries, Grossman endorsed Senator Elizabeth Warren.
