= Kristina Schultz =

American politician

Member of the New Hampshire House of Representatives from the Merrimack 29th district
- Incumbent
- Assumed office December 7, 2022

Member of the New Hampshire House of Representatives from the Merrimack 18th district
- In office 2017 – December 7, 2022

Personal details
- Party: Democratic

Kristina Schultz is an American politician. She serves as a Democratic member for the Merrimack 29th district of the New Hampshire House of Representatives.
