= Juliet Harvey-Bolia =

American politician

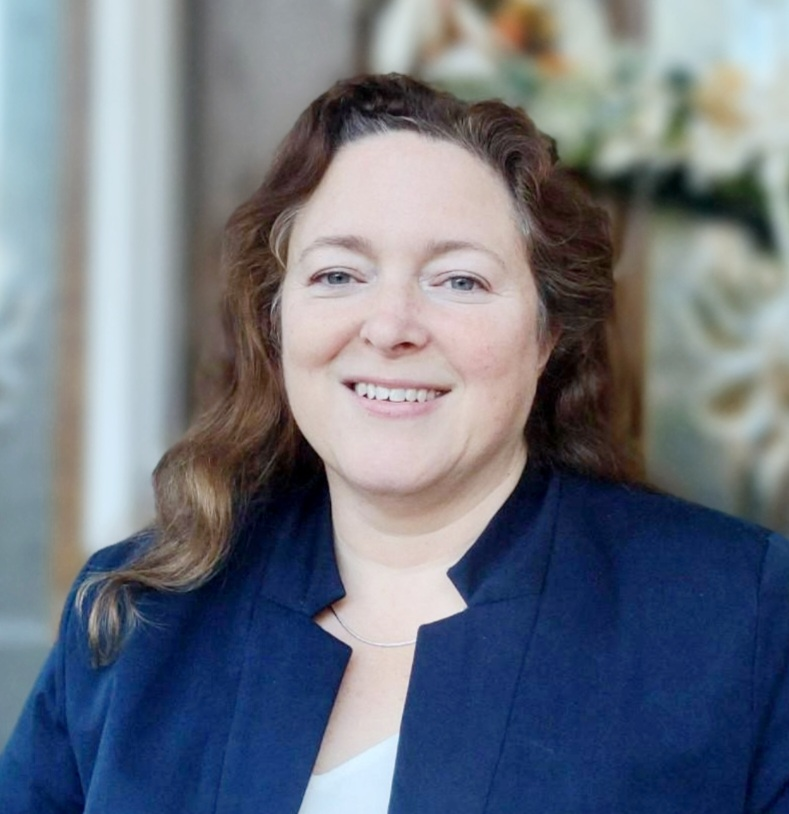
- Harvey-Bolia in 2024

Member of the New Hampshire House of Representatives from the Belknap 3rd district
- Incumbent
- Assumed office December 7, 2022
- Succeeded by: William Lawrence Jr. (elect)

Member of the New Hampshire House of Representatives from the Belknap 4th district
- In office December 2, 2020 – December 7, 2022

Personal details
- Party: Republican

Juliet Harvey-Bolia is an American politician. She serves as a Republican member for the Belknap 3rd district of the New Hampshire House of Representatives.
