= Tim Mannion =

American politician

Member of the New Hampshire House of Representatives from the Hillsborough 1st district
- Incumbent
- Assumed office December 4, 2024
- Preceded by: Kimberly Abare
- Succeeded by: Diane Rogers (elect)

Personal details
- Party: Republican

Tim Mannion is an American politician. He serves as a Republican member for the Hillsborough 1st district of the New Hampshire House of Representatives.
