= Maureen Mooney =

American attorney, educator, and politician

Member of the New Hampshire House of Representatives from the Hillsborough 21st district
- Incumbent
- Assumed office December 2, 2020
- In office 2002–2008

Personal details
- Party: Republican
- Education: Thomas More College of Liberal Arts (BA); Massachusetts School of Law (JD); New England College (MEd)

Maureen Mooney is an American attorney, educator, and politician serving as a member of the New Hampshire House of Representatives from the Hillsborough 21 district. Elected in November 2020, she assumed office on December 2, 2020. Mooney previously served as a member of the House from 2002 to 2008.

== Education ==
Mooney earned a Bachelor of Arts degree in political science from the Thomas More College of Liberal Arts, a Juris Doctor from the Massachusetts School of Law, and a Master of Education from New England College.

== Career ==
In 2000, Mooney became active in New Hampshire politics, serving as a delegate to the Republican State Convention. From 2008 to 2008, she served as a member of the New Hampshire House of Representatives. In 2008, Mooney was a consultant and conservative outreach director for the John McCain 2008 presidential campaign organization in New Hampshire. From 2009 to 2014, she worked as the associate dean at the American College of History and Legal Studies in Salem, New Hampshire. In 2014, she was an unsuccessful candidate for the New Hampshire Senate, placing second in the Republican primary after Gary Daniels. From 2014 to 2020, she worked as an administrator at a charter school. In 2020 Mooney was again elected to the New Hampshire House of Representatives. Mooney was then appointed an assistant Republican whip.
