= Kristin Noble =

American politician

The Honorable Kristin Noble
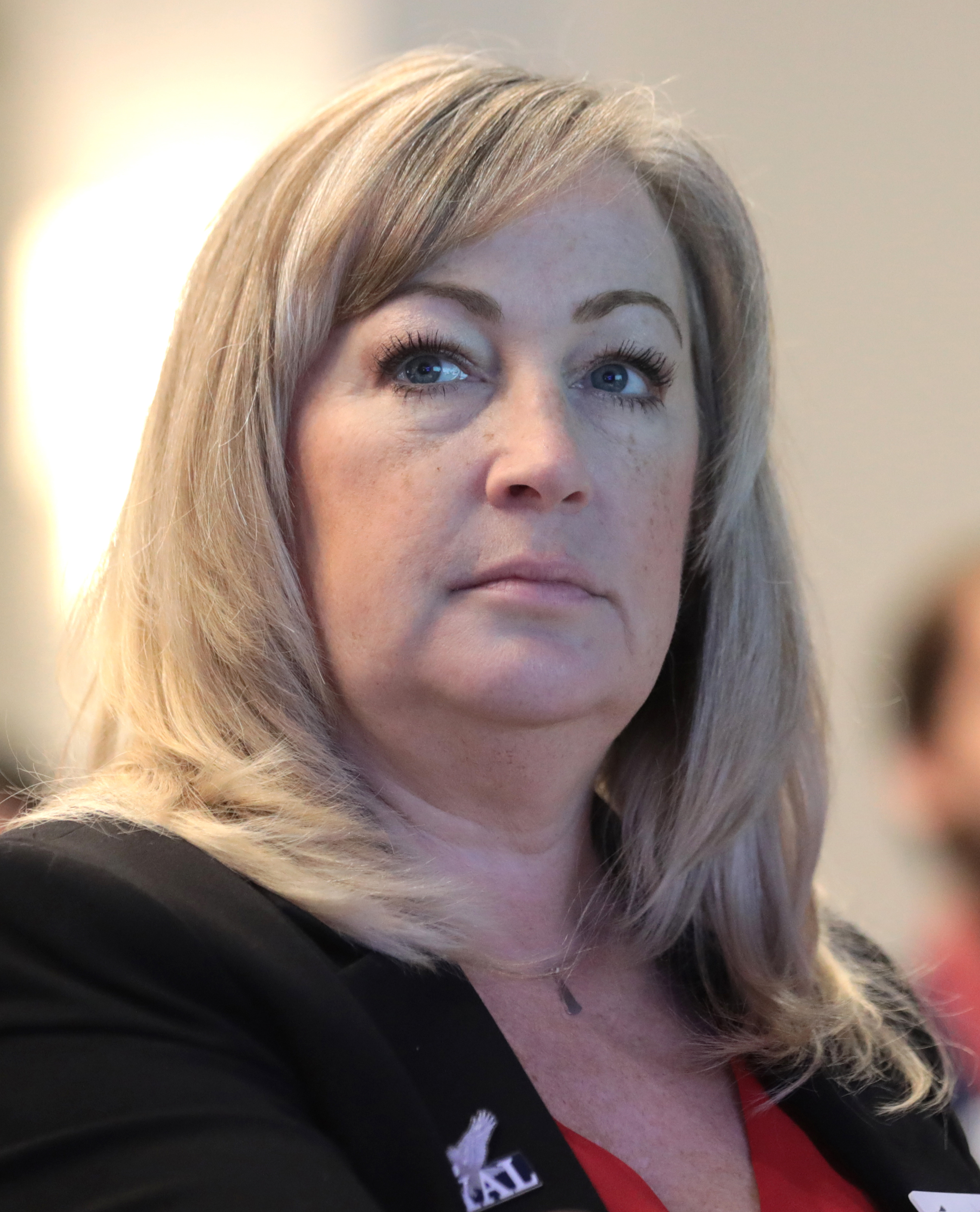

Member of the New Hampshire House of Representatives from the Hillsborough 2nd district
- Incumbent
- Assumed office December 7, 2022
- Succeeded by: John Fitzgerald (elect)

Personal details
- Born: Manchester, New Hampshire, U.S.
- Party: Republican
- Website: Official website

Kristin Noble is an American politician. She has served as a Republican member representing the Hillsborough 2nd district of the New Hampshire House of Representatives since 2022. She has served as the Vice Chair of the Education Policy and Administration Committee since 2024.

== Personal life ==
Kristin Noble was born and grew up in Manchester, New Hampshire, before moving to Bedford, New Hampshire where she currently resides with her husband, Jeff. She has one daughter and one step-daughter. Noble did not attend college and worked first in customer service and tech support. In a 2026 interview, she described taking classes at Nashua Technical College and working in security software before her election.

== Controversies ==
In January 2026, The Boston Globe and Concord Monitor reported on leaked images of controversial messages attributed to Kristin Noble in a private group chat among Republican legislators where she spoke of "segregated schools". The messages attributed to Noble were comments that "when we have segregated schools we can add all the fun stuff lol" and "imagine the scores though if we had schools for them and some for us". The messages criticism from Democratic lawmakers including House Minority Leader Alexis Simpson, who said that such references were inappropriate for the chair of the House Education Policy and Administration Committee. Noble’s office released a statement asserting that her comments were intended to refer to ideological differences in education policy rather than racial segregation.

The reporting noted that the controversy prompted discussion in state political circles about the tone and content of internal communications among legislators.

== Political positions ==
=== Education ===
Noble is on record opposing background checks of staff working at schools receiving state funds. In 2026, she supported SB 33, titled AN ACT relative to the regulation of public school materials, also known as a book ban asking, "Why did school libraries stop protecting our children in this way?" In a 2026 interview, Noble suggested adding materials from PragerU to public school libraries, and books and media from the Tuttle Twins series. Noble has referred to public schools as "leftist indoctrination centers" that have "libraries full of porn, biological males in girls sports and bathrooms, and as much DEI curriculum as their hearts desire".

=== Public Health ===
Noble has opposed mask mandates in schools stating that “School mask mandates had a negative impact on our children and did not provide an environment that is conducive to learning."
