= Loren Foxx =

American politician

Member of the New Hampshire House of Representatives from the Hillsborough 2nd district
- Incumbent
- Assumed office December 7, 2022
- Succeeded by: Ryan Nugent (elect)

Personal details
- Born: Newport Beach, California
- Party: Democratic

Loren Foxx is an American elected official. He serves as a Democratic member for the Hillsborough 2nd district of the New Hampshire House of Representatives.
