= Ricky Devoid =

American politician

Member of New Hampshire House of Representatives for Merrimack County's 1st district
- Incumbent
- Assumed office December 4, 2024
- Preceded by: Lorrie Carey

Personal details
- Born: Concord, New Hampshire, U.S.
- Party: Republican
- Website: www.devoidfornh.com

Ricky Devoid is an American politician. He is a member of the New Hampshire House of Representatives.
