= Diane Pauer =

American politician

Member of the New Hampshire House of Representatives from the Hillsborough 36th district
- Incumbent
- Assumed office December 7, 2022

Member of the New Hampshire House of Representatives from the Hillsborough 26th district
- In office December 2, 2020 – December 7, 2022
- Succeeded by: Mike Pellerito (elect)

Personal details
- Party: Republican

Diane Pauer is an American politician. She serves as a Republican member for the Hillsborough 36th district of the New Hampshire House of Representatives.
