= Peter Petrigno =

American politician

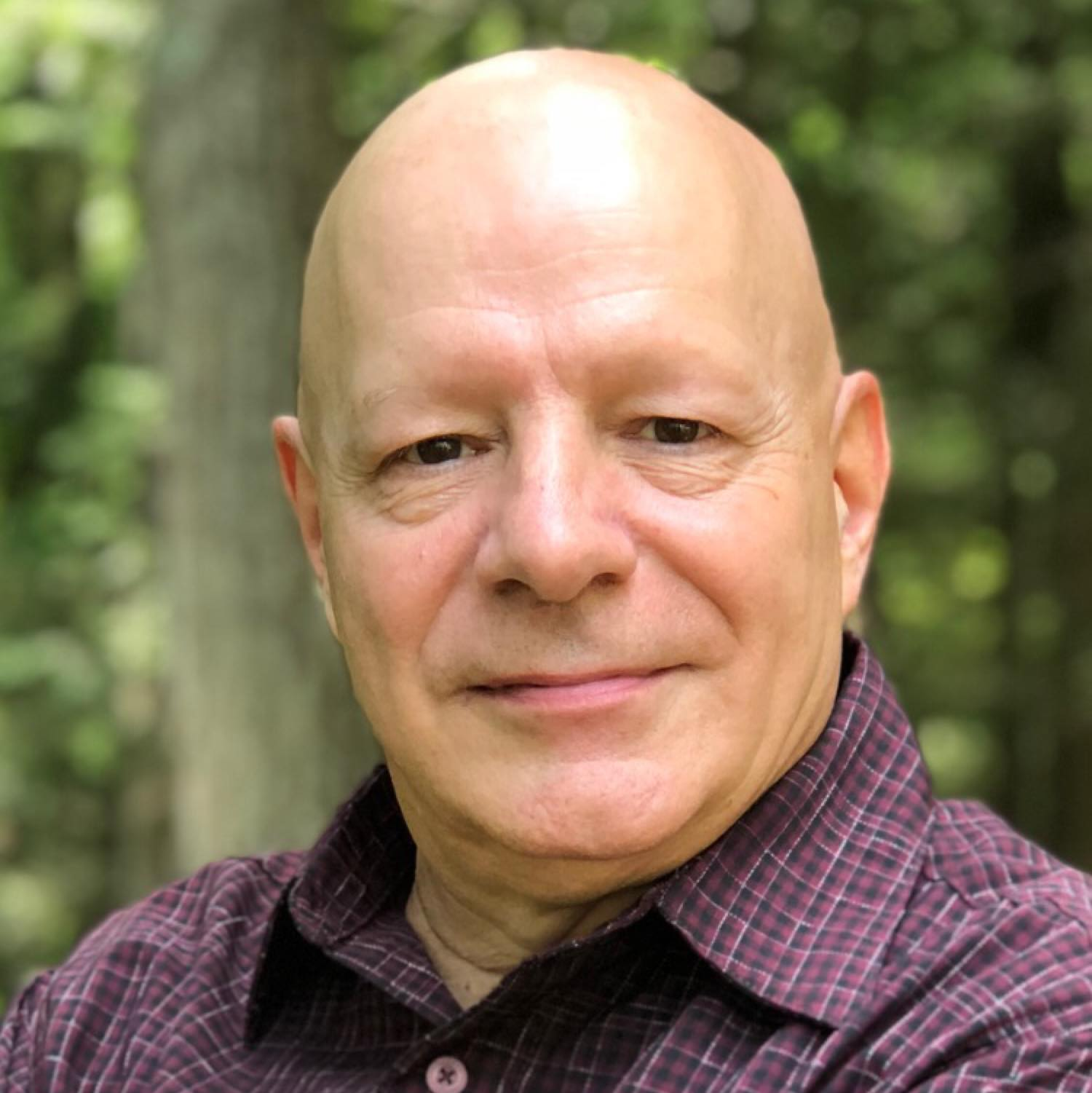

Member of the New Hampshire House of Representatives from the Hillsborough 43 district
- Incumbent
- Assumed office December 5, 2018

Personal details
- Born: January 7, 1954 (age 72) Boston, Massachusetts, U.S.
- Party: Democratic
- Spouse: Marie
- Children: 2
- Education: Boston State College
- Awards: New Hampshire Teacher of the Year, 2000
- Website: Campaign website

Peter Petrigno (born January 7, 1954) is an American politician, educator, and community organizer who is currently serving as a Democratic member of the New Hampshire House of Representatives for Hillsborough 43 - Milford. He was first elected in 2018.

== Early life and education ==
Peter Petrigno was born in Boston, Massachusetts, on January 7, 1954, to Frederick and Jean Petrigno and lived in Boston’s “Little Italy,” the North End before moving to Milford, NH. Peter's father, Frederick Petrigno, was a Court Officer for the Massachusetts House of Representatives. Petrigno attended Boston State College where he received a bachelor's degree in political science and later a Master of Education degree.

== Career ==
In the 1980s Petrigno led a group in the North End of Boston focused on limiting gentrification. In 1984, Petrigno founded the North End Historic District Committee in an effort to regulate unrestricted development in the neighborhood. He organized and led the effort to institute a 55 foot height limitation and roof overlay district. The new zoning ordinances were adopted in 1985. He was later appointed to the North End/Waterfront Neighborhood Council by the Mayor of Boston, Raymond Flynn. In 1987 Petrigno moved to Milford, New Hampshire.

Petrigno started his career as a social studies teacher in 1977 at Don Bosco Technical High School in Boston, where he taught until 1996. He taught at Mascenic Regional High School in New Ipswich, New Hampshire until 2000. Petrigno taught social studies at Merrimack High School where he was the head of the social studies department until he retired in 2017. Petrigno taught college courses as an adjunct professor in developmental studies at Nashua Community College until he retired in 2017.

Petrigno was honored as "New Hampshire Teacher of the Year" in 2000 by the New Hampshire Department of Education. In 2003 Petrigno received the Nashua NH area’s No Bell Outstanding Educator’s Award. Petrigno was presented with the New Hampshire Council for the Social Studies Lifetime Achievement Award in 2023.

== Political career ==
Petrigno was elected to represent the town of Milford in the New Hampshire House of Representatives in 2018 and was re-elected in 2020, 2022, and 2024. He did not seek re-election in 2026. He served as the ranking member on the Children and Family Law Committee from 2024-2026 and as clerk from 2022-2024 .
