= Samantha Fox (politician) =

American politician

Member of the New Hampshire House of Representatives from the Merrimack 23 district
- In office December 5, 2018 – January 12, 2021
- Succeeded by: Muriel Hall

Personal details
- Party: Democratic

Samantha Fox is an American politician who represents New Hampshire.

== Career ==
On November 6, 2018, Fox was elected to the New Hampshire House of Representatives where she represents the Merrimack 23 district. She assumed office on December 5, 2018. She is a Democrat. Fox resigned on January 12, 2021 as she was moving out of her district.

== Personal life ==
Fox resides in Bow, New Hampshire. Fox is married and has one child.
