= George Sykes (New Hampshire politician) =

American politician

Member of the New Hampshire House of Representatives from the Grafton 14th district
- Incumbent
- Assumed office December 5, 2012
- Succeeded by: Kathryn Brennan (elect)

Member of Lebanon City Council from Ward 2
- Incumbent
- Assumed office 2019

Personal details
- Born: June 3, 1951 (age 75) Providence, Rhode Island, U.S.
- Party: Democratic
- Children: 1
- Education: Bridgewater State College (BA); Southern New Hampshire University (MBA); Empire State College (BS)

George E. Sykes (born June 3, 1951) is an American politician serving as a member of the New Hampshire House of Representatives from the Grafton-14 district since December 5, 2012, and a member of the Lebanon City Council from Ward 2 since 2019. Sykes is a member of the Democratic Party.

Sykes was born in Providence, Rhode Island, in 1951 and lives in Lebanon, New Hampshire. In Lebanon, Sykes served as Deputy Fire Chief. Sykes served on the Lebanon City Council from 2008 to 2010, before taking a position with the American Red Cross providing relief to Haiti following the 2010 earthquake. In 2012, he was first elected to the New Hampshire House of Representatives. He is married and has one child.

During the 2018 New Hampshire House of Representatives election, Sykes pledged to introduce legislation banning single-use plastic bags, as well as look into the issues refugees face in getting driver's licenses.
