= David Meuse =

American politician

Member of the New Hampshire House of Representatives from the Rockingham 29th district
- In office 2018 – December 7, 2022

Member of the New Hampshire House of Representatives from the Rockingham 37th district
- Incumbent
- Assumed office December 7, 2022
- Succeeded by: Kate Cook (elect)

Personal details
- Party: Democratic

David Meuse is an American politician. He serves as a Democratic member for the Rockingham 37th district of the New Hampshire House of Representatives.
