= Wayne Burton (politician) =

American politician

Member of the New Hampshire House of Representatives from the Strafford 4th district
- In office 1984–1986
- In office 1988–1990

Member of the New Hampshire House of Representatives from the Strafford 6th district
- In office 2014–2018
- Incumbent
- Assumed office December 4, 2024
- Preceded by: Cam Kenney

Personal details
- Party: Democratic

Wayne Burton is an American politician. He serves as a Democratic member for the Strafford 6th district of the New Hampshire House of Representatives.
