= Buzz Scherr =

American politician

Member of the New Hampshire House of Representatives from the Rockingham 26th district
- Incumbent
- Assumed office December 4, 2024
- Preceded by: Joan Hamblet

Personal details
- Party: Democratic

Buzz Scherr is an American politician. He serves as a Democratic member for the Rockingham 26th district of the New Hampshire House of Representatives.
