= David Luneau =

American politician

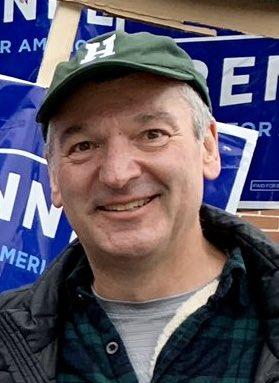
- David Lunaeu at a rally for Michael Bennet in 2020.

Member of the New Hampshire House of Representatives from the Merrimack 10th district
- Incumbent
- Assumed office 2014

Personal details
- Born: February 11, 1965 (age 61) Hopkinton, New Hampshire, U.S.
- Party: Democratic
- Profession: President of ClassCo, Inc.

David Luneau (born February 11, 1965) is a current member of the New Hampshire House of Representatives, one of the three members representing the Merrimack 10th District, Hopkinton and Concord, since 2014. He resides in Hopkinton and had served on the Hopkinton School Board from 2007 until 2019. He served as chairman of the board from 2007 to 2016. He also serves on the advisory board for NHTI, Concord's Community College, and on the industrial advisory board for the University of New Hampshire at Manchester.
