= Brian Labrie =

American politician

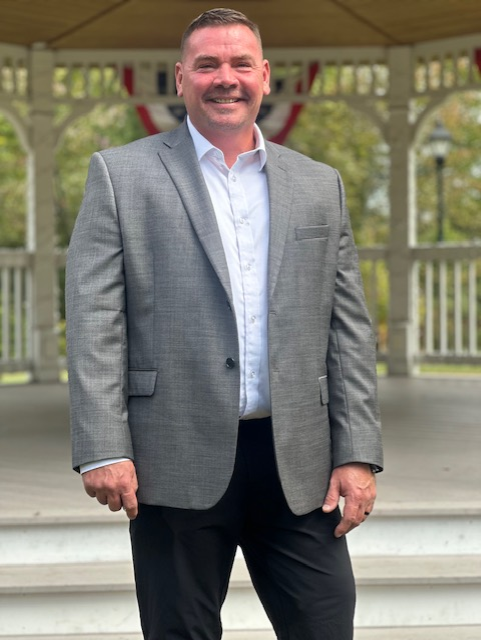

Member of New Hampshire House of Representatives for Hillsborough 2
- Incumbent
- Assumed office December 4, 2024
- Succeeded by: Jeffrey Kerr (elect)

Personal details
- Born: Nashua, New Hampshire
- Party: Republican
- Education: Southern New Hampshire University
- Website: brianlabrie.com

Brian Labrie is an American politician. He is a member of the New Hampshire House of Representatives.

Labrie holds a degree in Business Administration from Southern New Hampshire University.
