= Ted Gorski =

American politician

Member of the New Hampshire House of Representatives from the Hillsborough 7th district
- In office December 2, 2020 – December 7, 2022

Member of the New Hampshire House of Representatives from the Hillsborough 2nd district
- Incumbent
- Assumed office December 7, 2022
- Succeeded by: Todd Fahey (elect)

Personal details
- Party: Republican

Ted Gorski is an American politician. He serves as a Republican member for the Hillsborough 2nd district of the New Hampshire House of Representatives.
