= Jaci Grote =

American politician

Member of the New Hampshire House of Representatives from the Rockingham 24th district
- In office December 5, 2018 – June 15, 2026
- Succeeded by: Michael Moody (elect)

Personal details
- Party: Democratic

Jaci Grote is an American politician. She served as a Democratic member for the Rockingham 24th district of the New Hampshire House of Representatives. She resigned in June 2026.
