= Muriel Hall =

American politician

Member of the New Hampshire House of Representatives from the Merrimack 23rd district
- In office June 2021 – December 7, 2022
- Preceded by: Samantha Fox

Member of the New Hampshire House of Representatives from the Merrimack 9th district
- Incumbent
- Assumed office December 7, 2022

Personal details
- Party: Democratic

Muriel Hall is an American politician. She serves as a Democratic member for the Merrimack 9th district of the New Hampshire House of Representatives.

Incumbent Samantha Fox resigned from the New Hampshire House of Representatives in January, 2021, and a special election was held on June 8, 2021. Hall won the election and served as the representative for the Merrimack 23rd district through December 2022.
