= Tom Ploszaj =

American politician

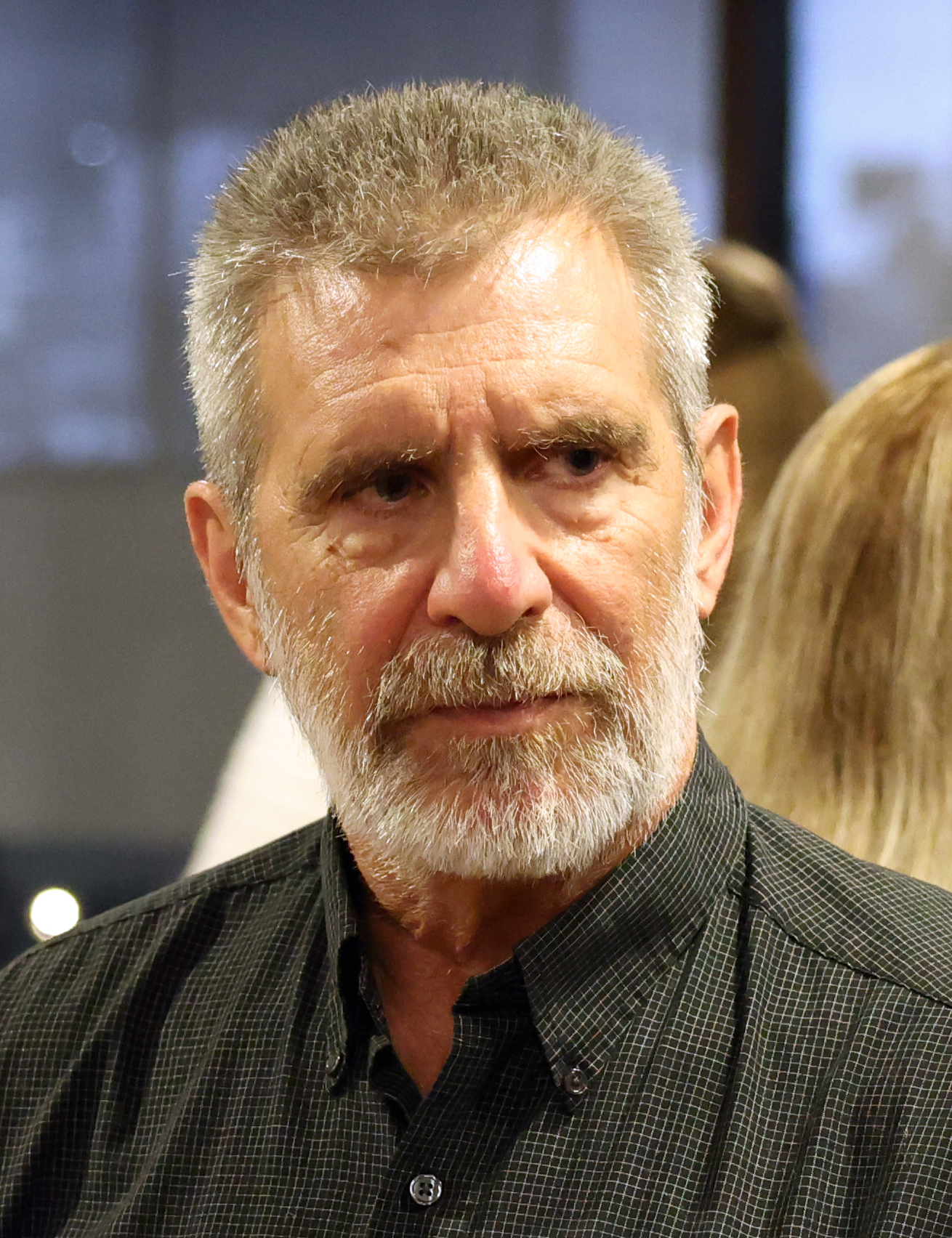
- Ploszaj in 2024

Member of the New Hampshire House of Representatives from the Belknap 1st district
- Incumbent
- Assumed office December 2, 2020
- Succeeded by: Amber Schaefer (elect)

Personal details
- Party: Republican; Independent (2025)

Tom Ploszaj is an American politician. He serves as a member for the Belknap 1st district of the New Hampshire House of Representatives.
