= Jennifer Mandelbaum =

American politician

Member of the New Hampshire House of Representatives from the Rockingham 21st district
- Incumbent
- Assumed office March 27, 2024
- Succeeded by: Anna Howard (elect)

Personal details
- Party: Democratic

Jennifer Mandelbaum is an American politician. She serves as a Democratic member for the Rockingham 21st district of the New Hampshire House of Representatives.
