= Joe Alexander Jr. =

American politician

Member of the New Hampshire House of Representatives
- Incumbent
- Assumed office December 7, 2022
- Constituency: Hillsborough 29th
- In office December 5, 2018 – December 7, 2022
- Constituency: Hillsborough 6th

Personal details
- Born: November 1994 (age 31)
- Party: Republican
- Education: Saint Anselm College (BA); University of New Hampshire (MPP)

Joseph H. Alexander Jr. is an American politician who has served in the New Hampshire House of Representatives since 2018. A member of the Republican party, Alexander has represented the Hillsborough 29th district since 2022 and previously represented the Hillsborough 6th district from 2018 to 2022. He has been the chair of the New Hampshire House of Representatives Housing Committee since its establishment following the 2022 election.

== Personal life ==
Alexander is a resident of Goffstown, New Hampshire. He earned a Bachelor of Arts degree in political science and government from Saint Anselm College in 2017 and a Master of Public Policy degree from the University of New Hampshire Carsey School of Public Policy.

== New Hampshire House of Representatives ==
Alexander is a former chairman of the Saint Anselm College Republicans. He first ran for office while a student at Saint Anselm College for the Merrimack 19th district of the New Hampshire House of Representatives in 2016 and lost in the general election to the incumbent, Christy Bartlett. In 2018, while he was taking courses for his master's degree at the University of New Hampshire, Alexander won the Republican party primary election for the Hillsborough 6th district of the New Hampshire House of Representatives by 41 votes. He won the general election and first became a member of the New Hampshire House of Representatives in 2018. He has served as chair of the New Hampshire House of Representatives Housing Committee since the committee's creation following the 2022 election. He also serves as chairman of the Goffstown Budget Committee.

In 2024, Alexander supported "Education Freedom Accounts" in New Hampshire. He testified in support of the legislation, using his experience as a gay person that attended high school to make the case that the legislation could allow more LGBT students to find more welcoming environments.

In 2024, Alexander texted a sexually inappropriate comment regarding Goffstown Select Board Vice Chair Kelly Boyer, who is a lesbian, which said "Yes, good job I hope you remember who always had your back and not the lesbian clit you wanna lick," to the Select Board Chair Peter Georgantas. Geogantas exposed and criticized Alexander for the comment. In late 2024, the Goffstown Select Board passed a new code of conduct for local elected and appointed officials as part of their new sexual harassment and sexual assault policy that was adopted as a result of the offensive text.
