= Steven Kesselring =

American politician

Member of New Hampshire House of Representatives for Hillsborough County's 18th district
- Incumbent
- Assumed office December 4, 2024
- Succeeded by: Jim Normand (elect)

Personal details
- Party: Republican
- Website: stevenkesselring.com

Steven Kesselring is an American politician. He is a member of the New Hampshire House of Representatives.
