= Jess Edwards =

American politician

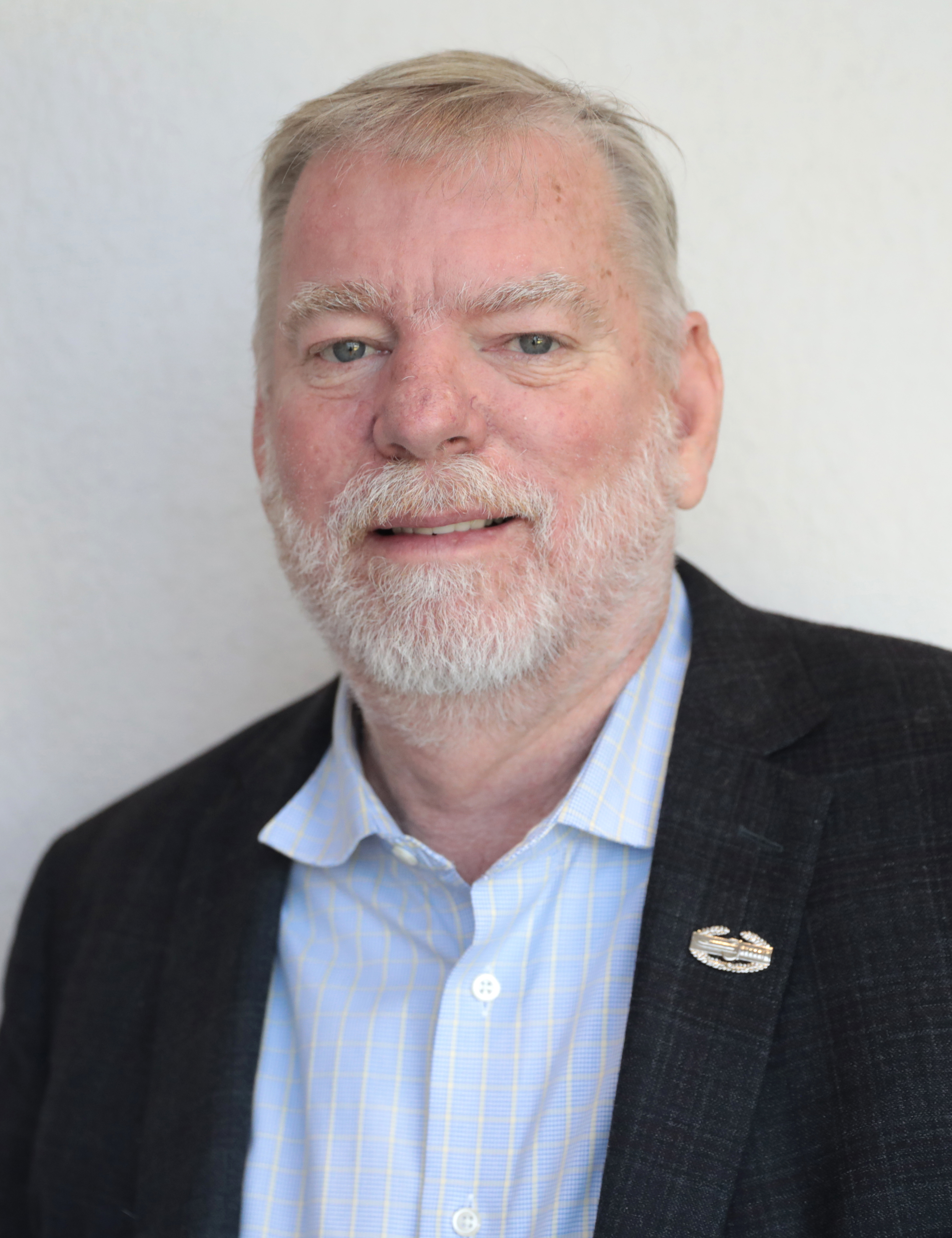
- Edwards at the 2022 Hazlitt Summit hosted by Young Americans for Liberty Foundation

Member of the New Hampshire House of Representatives from the Rockingham 4th district

Personal details
- Party: Republican

Jesse Craton Edwards Jr. is an American politician who is a member of the New Hampshire House of Representatives. He represents the Rockingham 4 district, comprising the towns of Auburn, Chester, and Sandown.

== Biography ==
Edwards served in the United States Medical Corps, reaching the rank of lieutenant colonel and retiring in 2009.

== Political career ==
Edwards is a Republican. In his third term, he was appointed to Chair Division III of the Finance Committee. In 2023, Edwards endorsed Ron DeSantis for president.

== Political positions ==
=== Abortion ===
In 2022, Edwards advocated for the successful passage of HB1609, which created an exemption for fatal fetal diagnoses to the 24-week abortion ban law passed in 2021.

=== Child marriage ===
In 2024, Edwards argued against raising New Hampshire's minimum marriage age from 16 to 18, stating that 16- and 17-year-olds "are a ripe, fertile age and may have a pregnancy and a baby involved", in which case "marriage might be the right solution" and should be available "as a legitimate social option" to avoid "making abortion a much more desirable alternative" for "some freedom-loving couples".

=== Menstrual care ===
In 2025, Edwards cosponsored a bill to repeal 2019 law requiring New Hampshire school districts to provide menstrual products to students. Edwards called the requirement "offensive". In 2023, Edwards unsuccessfully cosponsored HB129 which would have limited distribution of pads and tampons by making them available only by request from nurses and school administrators.

== Personal life ==
Edwards's daughter, Elizabeth, served as a state representative, and Edwards credits her service as the inspiration for his run for office.

== Electoral history ==
2020 Rockingham District 4 General Election
Party	Candidate	Votes	%
Republican	Jess Edwards (incumbent)	6,686	14
Republican	Chris True (incumbent)	6,330	13.3
Republican	Jason Osborne (incumbent)	6,235	13.1
Republican	Tony Piemonte (incumbent)	5,982	12.5
Republican	Oliver Ford	5,966	12.5
Democratic	Michael D'Angelo	3,533	7.4
Democratic	Jane Van Zandt	3,441	7.4
Democratic	Matthew Krohn	3,178	6.7
Democratic	Ben Geiger	3,162	6.6
Democratic	Russell Normal	3,158	6.6
Total votes		47,676	100
Republican hold			
Republican hold			
Republican hold			
Republican hold			
Republican hold			

2018 Rockingham District 4 General Election
Party	Candidate	Votes	%
Republican	Chris True (incumbent)	4,416	12.6
Republican	Jess Edwards (incumbent)	4,371	12.5
Republican	Becky Owens	4,236	12.1
Republican	Jason Osborne (incumbent)	4,093	11.7
Republican	Tony Piemonte	3,948	11.3
Democratic	Cynthia Herman	2,934	8.4
Democratic	Todd Bedard	2,834	8.1
Democratic	Patrick McLaughlin	2,784	8.0
Democratic	Stephen D'Angelo	2,698	7.7
Democratic	Benjamin Geiger	2,622	7.5
Total votes		34,940	100
Republican hold			
Republican hold			
Republican hold			
Republican hold			
Republican hold			
