= Gary Woods (politician) =

American politician

Member of New Hampshire House of Representatives for Merrimack County's 30th district
- Incumbent
- Assumed office December 4, 2024
- Preceded by: Rebecca McWilliams
- Succeeded by: Jason Quinno (elect)

Member of New Hampshire House of Representatives for Merrimack County's 23rd district
- In office 2018–2022
- Succeeded by: Merryl Gibbs

Personal details
- Party: Democratic
- Education: University of California, Berkeley; Johns Hopkins University; University of Rochester
- Website: www.gwoods4nhrep.org

Gary L. Woods is an American politician. He is a member of the New Hampshire House of Representatives. His district contains parts of Concord, New Hampshire.
