= Jim Creighton (politician) =

American politician

Member of the New Hampshire House of Representatives from the Hillsborough 38th district
- In office 2020 – December 7, 2022

Member of the New Hampshire House of Representatives from the Hillsborough 30th district
- Incumbent
- Assumed office December 7, 2022

Personal details
- Party: Republican

Jim Creighton is an American politician. He serves as a Republican member for the Hillsborough 30th district of the New Hampshire House of Representatives.
