= Pierre Dupont (New Hampshire politician) =

American politician

Member of New Hampshire House of Representatives for Hillsborough County's 20th district
- Incumbent
- Assumed office December 4, 2024
- Succeeded by: Pauline Martineau (elect)

Personal details
- Party: Republican

Pierre Dupont is an American politician. He is a member of the New Hampshire House of Representatives.
