= Alissandra Murray =

American politician

Member of the New Hampshire House of Representatives from the Hillsborough 20th district
- Incumbent
- Assumed office December 7, 2022

Personal details
- Party: Democratic

Alissandra Rodriguez Murray is an American politician. They serve as a Democratic member for the Hillsborough 20th district of the New Hampshire House of Representatives.

Murray is a first-generation Nicaraguan-American who grew up in New Hampshire, and identifies as both transgender and non-binary.

Murray is one of the few members of Generation Z serving within the New Hampshire House of Representatives.
