= Mark Vallone =

American politician

Member of the New Hampshire House of Representatives from the Rockingham 5th district
- Incumbent
- Assumed office December 7, 2022

Member of the New Hampshire House of Representatives from the Rockingham 9th district
- In office December 5, 2018 – December 2, 2020

Personal details
- Party: Democratic

Mark Vallone is an American politician. He serves as a Democratic member for the Rockingham 5th district of the New Hampshire House of Representatives.
