= New Hampshire House of Representatives =

Lower house of the New Hampshire General Court

- New Hampshire General Court

Type
- Type: Lower house
- Term limits: None

History
- New session started: December 4, 2024

Leadership
- Speaker: Sherman Packard (R) since January 6, 2021
- Speaker pro tempore: Jim Kofalt (R) since March 10, 2025
- Majority Leader: Jason Osborne (R) since December 2, 2020
- Minority Leader: Alexis Simpson (D) since December 4, 2024

Structure
- Seats: 400
- Political groups: Majority: Republican (212); Minority: Democratic (169); Independent (1); Vacant (18)
- Length of term: 2 years
- Authority: Part Second, New Hampshire Constitution
- Salary: $200/term ($100/year), plus daily travel

Elections
- Voting system: Plurality block voting
- Last election: November 5, 2024
- Next election: November 3, 2026
- Redistricting: Legislative control

Meeting place
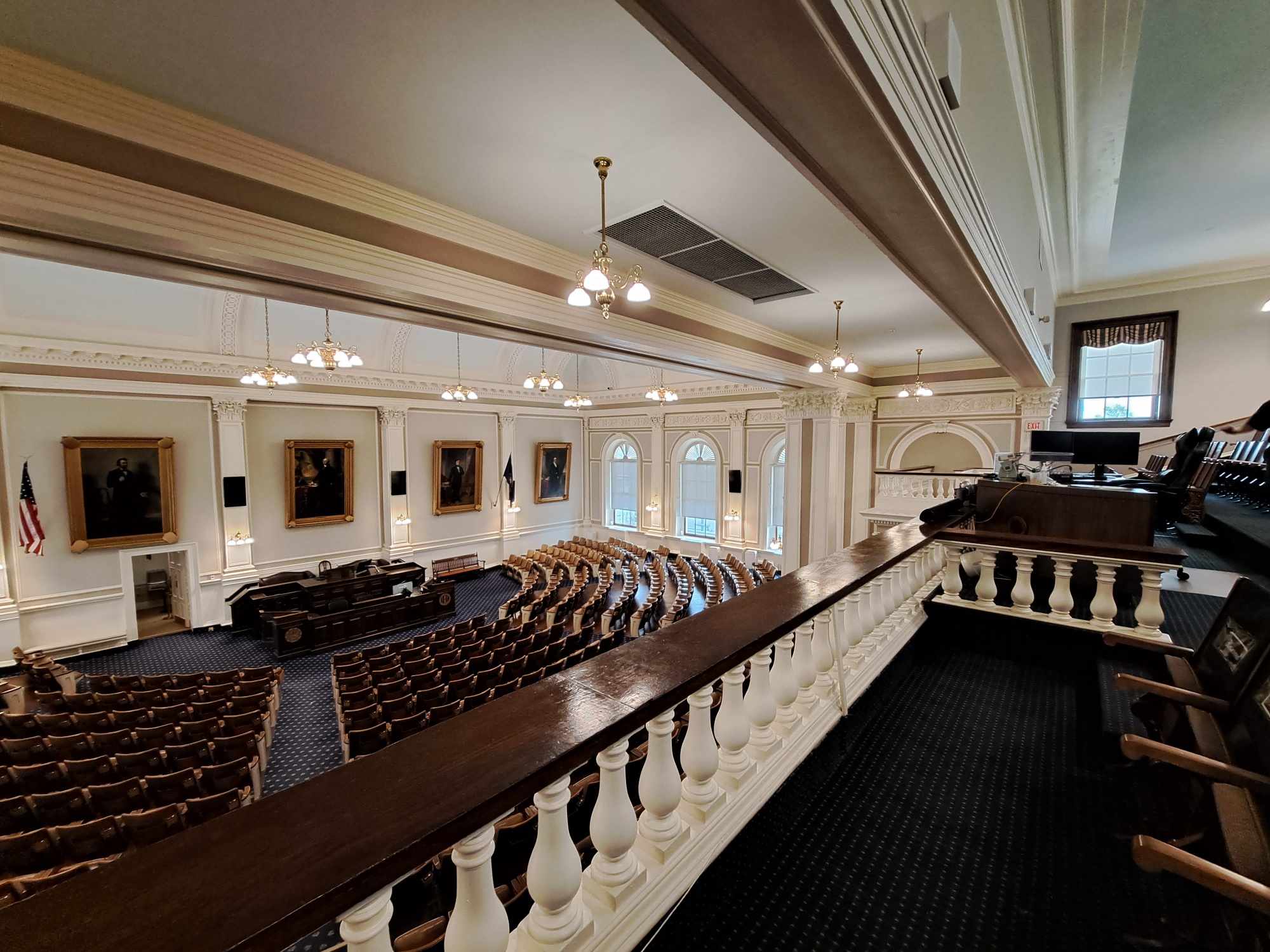
- House of Representatives Chamber; New Hampshire State House; Concord, New Hampshire

Website
- www.gencourt.state.nh.us/house

The New Hampshire House of Representatives is the lower house in the New Hampshire General Court, the bicameral legislature of the state of New Hampshire. The chamber consists of 400 members representing 203 legislative districts across the state, created from divisions of the state's counties. On average, each legislator represents about 3,300 residents, the smallest state legislative population-to-representative ratio in the country.

New Hampshire has by far the largest lower house of any American state; the second-largest, the Pennsylvania House of Representatives, has 203 members. The House ties the National Assembly of South Africa as the fourth-largest lower house in the English-speaking world (behind the 435-member United States House of Representatives, 543-member Lok Sabha of India, and 650-member House of Commons of the United Kingdom).

Districts vary in number of seats based on their populations, with the least-populous districts electing only one member and the most populous electing ten, not counting floterial seats.

Voters are allowed to cast as many votes as there are seats to be filled in the district. For instance, in a two-member district, a voter can vote for up to two candidates, in a ten-seat district, for up to ten candidates. Plurality block voting often results in one party winning all of the seats in the district, as the (cross-sectional) results below for the current representation attest. Like in the districts elected by first-past-the-post voting, proportionality of party represention is not generally produced.

Some municipalities are in multiple districts, including floterial districts, so as to achieve more equal apportionment by population.

Unlike in many state legislatures, there is no single "aisle" to cross per se, as members of both parties sit partially segregated in five sections. The seat section and number is put on the legislator's motor vehicle license plate, which they pay for if they wish to put one on their personal automobiles, or in the case of the chairpersons and party leaders, their title is put on the legislative plate. Seating location is enforced, as seating is pre-assigned. Although the personal preference of the legislator is asked, usually chairmen and those with special needs are given the preferred aisle seats. The sixth section is the Speaker's seat at the head of the hall.

The House of Representatives has met in Representatives Hall of the New Hampshire State House since 1819. Representatives Hall is thus the oldest chamber in the United States still in continuous legislative use. Large arched windows line the walls. On the rostrum hang portraits of John P. Hale, Abraham Lincoln, George Washington, Franklin Pierce, and Daniel Webster.

== Composition ==
↓
	169	212
V	Democratic	Republican	V

Affiliation	Party (Shading indicates majority caucus)				Total	Vacant
Affiliation	Democratic	Independent	Libertarian	Republican	Total	Vacant
End of 2010 session	216	0		174	390	10
Begin session 2011	102	0		298	400	0
End of 2012 session	104	0		290	394	6
Begin session 2013	219	0		179	398	2
End of 2014 session	213	0		173	386	14
Begin session 2015	160	1	0	239	400	0
End of 2016 session	156	1	1	230	388	12
Begin session 2017	173	0	0	226	399	1
End of 2018 session	167	0	3	211	381	19
Begin 2019 session	233	0		167	400	0
End of 2020 session	230	0		157	387	13
Begin 2021 session	187	0		213	400	0
End of 2022 session	178	1	0	202	381	19
Begin 2023 session	197	0		201	398	2
End of 2024 session	191	1	0	197	389	11
Begin 2025 session	177	1	0	221	399	1
March 10, 2025	177	1	0	220	398	2
April 11, 2025	177	2	0	219	398	2
June 19, 2025	177	2	0	218	397	3
June 24, 2025	178	2	0	218	398	2
July 21, 2025	177	2	0	218	397	3
September 23, 2025	177	2	0	217	396	4
October 16, 2025	177	1	0	218	396	4
October 31, 2025	177	1	0	217	395	5
November 4, 2025	177	1	0	218	396	4
November 12, 2025	177	1	0	217	395	5
January 30, 2025	176	1	0	217	394	6
February 4, 2026	177	1	0	216	394	6
February 14, 2026	177	1	0	215	393	7
March 1, 2026	177	1	0	214	392	8
March 10, 2026	178	1	0	214	393	7
April 27, 2026	177	1	0	215	393	7
May 22, 2026	177	1	0	214	392	8
May 28, 2026	176	1	0	214	391	9
June 15, 2026	174	1	0	214	389	11
July 3, 2026	173	1	0	214	388	12
July 15, 2026	173	1	0	213	387	13
July 30, 2026	172	1	0	213	386	14
August 3, 2026	170	1	0	213	384	16
August 22, 2026	169	1	0	213	383	17
August 27, 2026	169	1	0	212	382	18
Latest voting share	44.2%	0.3%		55.5%		

== Leadership ==
The current leadership of the house is as follows:

Position	Representative	Town	Party
Speaker of the House	Sherman Packard	Londonderry	Rep
Majority Leader	Jason Osborne	Auburn	Rep
Deputy Speaker	Steven D. Smith	Charlestown	Rep
Speaker Pro Tempore	Jim Kofalt	Wilton	Rep
Majority Senior Advisor	Jim Kofalt	Wilton	Rep
Deputy Majority Leader	Joseph Sweeney	Salem	Rep
Majority Whip	Mike Drago	Raymond	Rep
Majority Floor Leader	Keith Ammon	New Boston	Rep
Deputy Majority Floor Leader	Juliet Harvey-Bolia	Tilton	Rep
Assistant Majority Leader	Brian Labrie	Bedford	Rep
Assistant Majority Leader	Jeanine Notter	Merrimack	Rep
Assistant Majority Leader	Lex Berezhny	Grafton	Rep
Deputy Majority Whip	Claudine Burnham	Milton	Rep
Assistant Majority Whip	Larry Gagne	Manchester	Rep
Assistant Majority Whip	Lisa Freeman	Tilton	Rep
Assistant Majority Whip	Tom Mannion	Pelham	Rep
Assistant Majority Whip	Tanya Donnelly	Salem	Rep
Assistant Majority Whip	Steven Bogert	Laconia	Rep
Minority Leader	Alexis Simpson	Exeter	Dem
Deputy Minority Leader	Laura Telerski	Nashua	Dem
Minority Caucus Chair	Matthew Wilhelm	Manchester	Dem
Minority Leader Pro Tempore	Karen Ebel	New London	Dem
Minority Floor Leader	Lucy Weber	Walpole	Dem
Deputy Minority Floor Leader	Nicholas Germana	Keene	Dem
Senior Minority Advisor	Mary Jane Wallner	Concord	Dem
Senior Minority Advisor	Brian Sullivan	Grantham	Dem
Minority Advisor	Dave Luneau	Hopkinton	Dem
Minority Advisor	Jaci Grote	Rye	Dem

== Committees ==
The current committee leadership in the New Hampshire House of Representatives is listed below.

The chair is the presiding officer of the committee, responsible for leading hearings, maintaining order, and enforcing committee rules. In the absence of the chair, the vice chair becomes presiding officer for the hearing. The clerk is responsible for all administrative matters for the committee, including attendance, minutes, and recording votes. The ranking member is the chief representative of the minority party on the committee, and is traditionally appointed chair when the majority changes hands. Chairs and vice chairs are appointed by and serve at the pleasure of the speaker, while ranking members are appointed by the speaker on recommendation of the minority leader. The committee clerk is selected by the committee chair. The speaker can unilaterally remove or reassign any committee member, chair, vice chair or clerk.

Committee	Chair	Vice Chair	Clerk	Ranking Member	Deputy Ranking Member
Children and Family Law	Mark Pearson (R)	Debra DeSimone (R)	Jodi Nelson (R)	Peter Petrigno (D)	Gaby Grossman (D)
Commerce and Consumer Affairs	John B. Hunt (R)	John Potucek (R)	Lisa Post (R)	Anita Burroughs (D)	Carry Spier (D)
Criminal Justice and Public Safety	Terry Roy (R)	Jennifer Rhodes (R)	Alissandra Murray (D)	Linda Harriott-Gathright (D)	David Meuse (D)
Education Funding	Rick Ladd (R)	Walter Spilsbury (R)		David Luneau (D)	Hope Damon (D)
Education Policy and Administration	Glenn Cordelli (R)	Kristin Noble (R)	Margaret Drye (R)	Patricia Cornell (D)	Muriel Hall (D)
Election Law	Ross Berry (R)	James Qualey (R)	Claudine Burnham (R)	Connie Lane (D)	Russell Muirhead (D)
Environment and Agriculture	Judy Aron (R)	Jim Creighton (R)	Seth King (R)	Peter Bixby (D)	Nick Germana (D)
Executive Departments and Administration	Carol McGuire (R)	Erica Layon (R)	John Sytek (R)	Jaci Grote (D)	Heath Howard (D)
Finance	Kenneth Weyler (R)	Dan McGuire (R)	Gerald Griffin (R)	Mary Jane Wallner (D)	Karen Ebel (D)
Finance – Division I	Dan McGuire (R)	Jose Cambrils (R)	Peter Leishman (D)	Karen Ebel (D)	
Finance – Division II	Keith Erf (R)	Daniel Popovici-Muller (R)		Kate Murray (D)	
Finance – Division III	Jess Edwards (R)	Maureen Mooney (R)	Rich Nalevanko (R)	Laura Telerski (D)	
Fish and Game and Marine Resources	James Spillane (R)	Mike Ouellet (R)	Sayra DeVito (R)	Cathryn Harvey (D)	Loren Foxx (D)
Health, Human Services and Elderly Affairs	Wayne MacDonald (R)	Lisa Mazur (R)	David Nagel (R)	Lucy Weber (D)	Jessica Lamontagne (D)
Housing	Joe Alexander (R)	Brian Cole (R)	Sherri Reinfurt (R)	David Paige (D)	Ellen Read (D)
Judiciary	Robert Lynn (R)	Dennis Mannion (R)	Katy Peternel (R)	Margorie Smith (D)	Paul Berch (D)
Labor, Industrial and Rehabilitative Services	Jim Creighton (R)	Lino Avellani (R)	Steven Kesselring (R)	Brian Sullivan (D)	Timothy Soucy (D)
Legislative Administration	Gregory Hill (R)	Vanessa Sheehan (R)	Shane Sirois (R)	Janet Wall (D)	Stephanie Payeur (D)
Municipal and County Government	Diane Pauer (R)	John MacDonald (R)	Marie Louise Bjelobrk (R)	Laurel Stavis (D)	Jim Maggiore (D)
Public Works and Highways	David Milz (R)	Charles Melvin (R)	Bill Boyd (R)	John Cloutier (D)	Michael Edgar (D)
Resources, Recreation and Development	Robert Harb (R)	Arnold Davis (R)	Ron Dunn (R)	Allison Knab (D)	Heather Baldwin (D)
Rules	Sherman Packard (R)	Steve Shurtleff (D)	Paul Smith (House Clerk)	Alexis Simpson (D)	
Science, Technology and Energy	Michael Vose (R)	Douglas Thomas (R)	JD Bernardy (R)	Kat Mcghee (D)	Tom Cormen (D)
State-Federal Relations and Veterans Affairs	Michael Moffett (R)	Skip Rollins (R)	Jennifer Mandelbaum (D)	Christine Seibert (D)	Christal Lloyd (D)
Transportation	Thomas Walsh (R)	Ted Gorski (R)	Karel Crawford (R)	George Sykers (D)	Dan Veilleux (D)
Ways and Means	John Janigian (R)	Jordan Ulery (R)	Bill Ohm (R)	Susan Almy (D)	Dennis Malloy (D)

== List of members (2024–2026) ==
County	District	Name	Party	Areas	Start
Belknap	1	Tom Ploszaj	Rep	Center Harbor, New Hampton	2020
Belknap	2	Matthew Coker	Rep (Note: Coker served as a Democrat from 2022–2024 and as a Republican from 2024–present.)	Meredith	2022
Belknap	2	Vacant		Meredith	2026
Belknap	3	Juliet Harvey-Bolia	Rep	Sanbornton, Tilton	2020
Belknap	4	Travis Toner	Rep	Belmont	2024
Belknap	5	Steven Bogert	Rep	Laconia (Wards 1, 3–6)	2022
Belknap	5	Mike Bordes	Rep	Laconia (Wards 1, 3–6)	2020
Belknap	5	Sheri Minor	Rep	Laconia (Wards 1, 3–6)	2024
Belknap	5	Vacant		Laconia (Wards 1, 3–6)	
Belknap	6	Vacant		Gilford, Gilmanton, Laconia (Ward 2)	2026
Belknap	6	Glen Aldrich (Note: Aldrich previously served in the state house from 2014–2022.)	Rep	Gilford, Gilmanton, Laconia (Ward 2)	2024
Belknap	6	Russell Dumais (Note: Dumais previously served in the state house from 2014–2016.)	Rep	Gilford, Gilmanton, Laconia (Ward 2)	2022
Belknap	6	David Nagel	Dem (Note: Nagel served as a Republican from 2022–2026 and as a Democrat from 2026–present.)	Gilford, Gilmanton, Laconia (Ward 2)	2022
Belknap	7	Barbara Comtois	Rep	Alton, Barnstead	2016
Belknap	7	Paul Terry	Rep	Alton, Barnstead	2020
Belknap	7	Peter Varney	Rep	Alton, Barnstead	2014
Belknap	8	Lisa Freeman	Rep	Belmont, Sanbornton, Tilton	2024
Belknap	8	Douglas Trottier	Rep	Belmont, Sanbornton, Tilton	2020
Carroll	1	Thomas Buco (Note: Buco previously served in the state house from 2004–2010.)	Dem	Conway	2012
Carroll	1	David Paige	Dem	Conway	2022
Carroll	1	Stephen Woodcock	Dem	Conway	2018
Carroll	2	Anita Burroughs	Dem	Albany, Bartlett, Chatham, Hale's Location, Hart's Location, Jackson, Sandwich	2018
Carroll	2	Chris McAleer	Dem	Albany, Bartlett, Chatham, Hale's Location, Hart's Location, Jackson, Sandwich	2020
Carroll	3	Joseph Hamblen	Rep	Madison, Moultonborough, Tamworth	2024
Carroll	3	Karel Crawford	Rep	Madison, Moultonborough, Tamworth	2012
Carroll	4	Lino Avellani	Rep	Brookfield, Eaton, Effingham, Freedom, Wakefield	2014
Carroll	4	Mike Belcher	Rep	Brookfield, Eaton, Effingham, Freedom, Wakefield	2022
Carroll	5	Jonathan Smith	Rep	Ossipee	2020
Carroll	6	John MacDonald	Rep	Tuftonboro, Wolfeboro	2018
Carroll	6	Katy Peternel	Rep	Tuftonboro, Wolfeboro	2022
Carroll	7	Bobbi Boudman	Dem	Ossipee, Tuftonboro, Wolfeboro	2026 (Note: Originally elected in a special election.)
Carroll	8	Richard Brown	Rep	Brookfield, Eaton, Effingham, Freedom, Madison, Moultonborough, Tamworth, Wakefield	2024
Carroll	8	Brian Taylor	Rep	Brookfield, Eaton, Effingham, Freedom, Madison, Moultonborough, Tamworth, Wakefield	2024
Cheshire	1	Vacant		Keene (Ward 1)	2026
Cheshire	2	Dru Fox	Dem	Keene (Ward 3)	2020
Cheshire	3	Philip Jones	Dem	Keene (Ward 5)	2022
Cheshire	4	Jodi Newell	Dem	Keene (Ward 4)	2022
Cheshire	5	Lucy Weber	Dem	Surry, Walpole	2006
Cheshire	6	Paul Berch (Note: Berch previously served in the state house from 2012–2022.)	Dem	Chesterfield, Hinsdale, Westmoreland	2024
Cheshire	6	Cathryn Harvey	Dem	Chesterfield, Hinsdale, Westmoreland	2016
Cheshire	7	Terri O'Rorke	Dem	Keene (Ward 2)	2024
Cheshire	8	Lucius Parshall	Dem	Harrisville, Marlborough, Nelson, Roxbury, Sullivan	2020
Cheshire	9	Rich Nalevanko	Rep	Alstead, Gilsum, Marlow	2024
Cheshire	10	Barrett Faulkner	Dem	Richmond, Swanzey	2016
Cheshire	10	Sly Karasinski	Rep	Richmond, Swanzey	2024
Cheshire	11	Denis Murphy	Rep	Winchester	2024
Cheshire	12	Dick Thackston	Rep	Fitzwilliam, Troy	2022
Cheshire	13	Richard Ames	Dem	Dublin, Jaffrey	2012
Cheshire	14	John B. Hunt	Rep	Rindge	1986
Cheshire	15	Samantha Jacobs	Dem	Chesterfield, Hinsdale, Keene (Wards 1–5)	2024
Cheshire	15	Nicholas Germana	Dem	Chesterfield, Hinsdale, Keene (Wards 1–5)	2022
Cheshire	16	James Gruber	Dem	Alstead, Gilsum, Harrisville, Keene (Ward 2), Marlborough, Marlow, Nelson, Roxbury, Stoddard, Sullivan	2024
Cheshire	17	Jennifer Rhodes	Rep	Fitzwilliam, Richmond, Swanzey, Troy, Winchester	2020
Cheshire	18	Jim Qualey	Rep	Dublin, Jaffrey, Rindge	2020
Cheshire	18	Rita Mattson	Rep	Dublin, Jaffrey, Rindge	2024
Coös	1	Sean Durkin	Rep	Dalton, Lancaster, Northumberland, Stratford	2024
Coös	1	James Tierney Jr.	Rep	Dalton, Lancaster, Northumberland, Stratford	2022
Coös	2	Arnold Davis	Rep	Atkinson and Gilmanton Academy Grant, Cambridge, Clarksville, Dix's Grant, Dixville, Dummer, Errol, Milan, Millsfield, Odell, Pittsburg, Second College Grant, Stark, Wentworth Location	2020
Coös	3	Mike Ouellet	Rep	Colebrook, Columbia, Erving's Location, Stewartstown	2022
Coös	4	Seth King	Rep	Carroll, Jefferson, Kilkenny, Whitefield	2022
Coös	5	Pete Morency	Rep	Berlin	2024
Coös	5	Marc Tremblay (Note: Tremblay previously served in the state house from 2010–2012.)	Rep	Berlin	2025
Coös	6	Vacant		Bean's Grant, Bean's Purchase, Chandler's Purchase, Crawford's Purchase, Cutt's Grant, Gorham, Green's Grant, Hadley's Purchase, Low and Burbank's Grant, Martin's Location, Pinkham's Grant, Randolph, Sargent's Purchase, Shelburne, Success, Thompson and Meserve's Purchase	2026
Coös	7	Lori Korzen	Rep	Berlin, Carroll, Jefferson, Kilkenny, Whitefield	2024
Grafton	1	Joseph Barton	Rep	Bath, Lisbon, Littleton, Lyman, Monroe, Sugar Hill	2024
Grafton	1	Darrell Louis	Rep	Bath, Lisbon, Littleton, Lyman, Monroe, Sugar Hill	2024
Grafton	1	Calvin Beaulier	Rep	Bath, Lisbon, Littleton, Lyman, Monroe, Sugar Hill	2024
Grafton	2	Jared Sullivan	Dem	Bethlehem, Franconia	2022
Grafton	3	Jerry Stringham (Note: Stringham previously served in the state house from 2018–2020.)	Dem	Easton, Lincoln, Livermore, Woodstock	2022
Grafton	4	Heather Baldwin	Dem	Ellsworth, Thornton, Waterville Valley	2022
Grafton	5	Rick Ladd	Rep	Benton, Haverhill, Landaff, Piermont, Warren	2024
Grafton	5	Marie Louise Bjelobrk	Rep	Benton, Haverhill, Landaff, Piermont, Warren	2008
Grafton	6	Linda Franz	Rep	Orford, Rumney, Wentworth	2024
Grafton	7	Janet Lucas	Dem	Campton	2024
Grafton	8	Sallie Fellows	Dem	Ashland, Holderness, Plymouth	2022
Grafton	8	Peter Lovett	Dem	Ashland, Holderness, Plymouth	2018
Grafton	8	Bill Bolton	Dem	Ashland, Holderness, Plymouth	2022
Grafton	9	Vacant		Canaan, Dorchester, Orange	
Grafton	10	John Sellers	Rep	Bridgewater, Bristol	2022
Grafton	11	Lex Berezhny	Rep	Alexandria, Grafton, Groton, Hebron	2020
Grafton	12	Mary Hakken-Phillips	Dem	Hanover, Lyme	2020
Grafton	12	Russell Muirhead	Dem	Hanover, Lyme	2020
Grafton	12	Ellen Rockmore	Dem	Hanover, Lyme	2024
Grafton	12	Terry Spahr	Dem	Hanover, Lyme	2024
Grafton	13	Laurel Stavis	Dem	Lebanon (Ward 1)	2018
Grafton	14	George Sykes	Dem	Lebanon (Ward 2)	2012
Grafton	15	Thomas H. Cormen	Dem	Lebanon (Ward 3)	2022
Grafton	16	David Fracht	Dem	Enfield	2023
Grafton	17	Susan Almy	Dem	Lebanon (Wards 1–3)	1996
Grafton	18	Donald McFarlane	Rep	Alexandria, Bridgewater, Bristol, Canaan, Dorchester, Enfield, Grafton, Groton, Hebron, Orange	2024
Hillsborough	1	Tim Mannion	Rep	Pelham	2024
Hillsborough	1	Tom Mannion	Rep	Pelham	2022
Hillsborough	1	Vacant		Pelham	2026
Hillsborough	1	Jeffrey Tenczar	Rep	Pelham	2022
Hillsborough	2	Loren Foxx	Dem	Bedford	2022
Hillsborough	2	Ted Gorski	Rep	Bedford	2020
Hillsborough	2	Linda Gould	Rep	Bedford	2014
Hillsborough	2	Brian Labrie	Rep	Bedford	2024
Hillsborough	2	Kristin Noble	Rep	Bedford	2022
Hillsborough	2	Catherine Rombeau	Dem	Bedford	2021
Hillsborough	2	John Schneller (Note: Schneller previously served in the state house from 2010–2012.)	Rep	Bedford	2012
Hillsborough	3	Paige Beauchemin	Dem	Nashua (Ward 4)	2023
Hillsborough	3	Fred Davis Jr. (Note: Davis previously served in the state house from 2018–2020.)	Dem	Nashua (Ward 4)	2022
Hillsborough	3	Marc Plamondon	Dem	Nashua (Ward 4)	2023
Hillsborough	4	Ray Newman	Dem	Nashua (Ward 2)	2018
Hillsborough	4	Sue Newman	Dem	Nashua (Ward 2)	2016
Hillsborough	4	Linda Ryan	Dem	Nashua (Ward 2)	2022
Hillsborough	5	Susan Elberger	Dem	Nashua (Ward 1)	2022
Hillsborough	5	Dale Swanson	Dem	Nashua (Ward 1)	2024
Hillsborough	5	Heather Raymond	Dem	Nashua (Ward 1)	2022
Hillsborough	6	Lee Ann Kluger	Dem	Nashua (Ward 3)	2024
Hillsborough	6	Carry Spier	Dem	Nashua (Ward 3)	2022
Hillsborough	6	Vacant		Nashua (Ward 3)	
Hillsborough	7	Alicia Gregg	Dem	Nashua (Ward 7)	2022
Hillsborough	7	Louis Juris	Dem	Nashua (Ward 7)	2022
Hillsborough	7	Catherine Sofikitis	Dem	Nashua (Ward 7)	2016
Hillsborough	8	Efstathia Booras (Note: Booras previously served in the state house from 2012–2016.)	Dem	Nashua (Ward 6)	2020
Hillsborough	8	Christal Lloyd	Dem	Nashua (Ward 6)	2022
Hillsborough	8	Kevin Scully	Rep	Nashua (Ward 6)	2024
Hillsborough	9	William Dolan	Dem	Nashua (Ward 5)	2022
Hillsborough	9	Sanjeev Manohar	Dem	Nashua (Ward 5)	2024
Hillsborough	9	Santosh Salvi	Dem	Nashua (Ward 5)	2024
Hillsborough	10	Linda Harriott-Gathright (Note: Harriott-Gathright previously served in the state house from 2012–2014.)	Dem	Nashua (Ward 9)	2018
Hillsborough	10	Martin Jack	Dem	Nashua (Ward 9)	2012
Hillsborough	10	Bill Ohm	Rep	Nashua (Ward 9)	2024
Hillsborough	11	Manoj Chourasia	Dem	Nashua (Ward 8)	2024
Hillsborough	11	Will Darby	Dem	Nashua (Ward 8)	2022
Hillsborough	11	Laura Telerski	Dem	Nashua (Ward 8)	2018
Hillsborough	12	William Boyd III	Rep	Merrimack	2021
Hillsborough	12	Julie Miles	Rep	Merrimack	2024
Hillsborough	12	Adam Presa	Rep	Merrimack	2024
Hillsborough	12	Maureen Mooney (Note: Mooney previously served in the state house from 2002–2008.)	Rep	Merrimack	2020
Hillsborough	12	Nancy Murphy (Note: Murphy previously served in the state house from 2018–2020.)	Dem	Merrimack	2022
Hillsborough	12	Jeanine Notter	Rep	Merrimack	2010
Hillsborough	12	Rosemarie Rung	Dem	Merrimack	2018
Hillsborough	12	Wendy Thomas (Note: Thomas previously served in the state house from 2018–2020.)	Dem	Merrimack	2022
Hillsborough	13	Dillon Dumont	Rep	Hudson	2024
Hillsborough	13	Cathy Kenny	Rep	Hudson	2022
Hillsborough	13	Andrew Prout	Rep	Hudson	2016
Hillsborough	13	Jeremy Slottje	Rep	Hudson	2024
Hillsborough	13	Jordan Ulery	Rep	Hudson	2004
Hillsborough	13	Robert Wherry	Rep	Hudson	2022
Hillsborough	14	Richard Lascelles	Rep	Litchfield	2016
Hillsborough	14	Raymond Peeples	Rep	Litchfield	2024
Hillsborough	15	Mark McLean (Note: McLean previously served in the state house from 2014–2016.)	Rep	Manchester (Ward 8)	2017
Hillsborough	15	Mark Proulx (Note: Proulx previously served in the state house from 2010–2012 and 2014–2020.)	Rep	Manchester (Ward 8)	2022
Hillsborough	16	Dan Bergeron	Dem	Manchester (Ward 6)	2024
Hillsborough	16	Larry Gagne	Rep	Manchester (Ward 6)	2008
Hillsborough	17	Linda DiSilvestro	Dem	Manchester (Ward 2)	2012
Hillsborough	17	David Preece	Dem	Manchester (Ward 2)	2022
Hillsborough	18	Jessica Grill	Dem	Manchester (Ward 12)	2022
Hillsborough	18	Steven Kesselring	Rep	Manchester (Ward 12)	2024
Hillsborough	19	Suzanne Chretien	Dem	Manchester (Ward 10)	2024
Hillsborough	19	Matt Drew	Rep	Manchester (Ward 10)	2024
Hillsborough	20	Pierre Dupont	Rep	Manchester (Ward 9)	2024
Hillsborough	20	Alissandra Murray	Dem	Manchester (Ward 9)	2022
Hillsborough	21	Matthew Wilhelm	Dem	Manchester (Ward 1)	2018
Hillsborough	21	Christine Seibert	Dem	Manchester (Ward 1)	2022
Hillsborough	22	Patricia Cornell	Dem	Manchester (Ward 11)	2014
Hillsborough	22	Nicole Leapley	Dem	Manchester (Ward 11)	2022
Hillsborough	23	Jean Jeudy	Dem	Manchester (Ward 3)	2005
Hillsborough	23	Mary Ngwanda Georges	Dem	Manchester (Ward 3)	2024
Hillsborough	24	Vacant		Manchester (Ward 4)	2025
Hillsborough	24	Christopher Herbert	Dem	Manchester (Ward 4)	2014
Hillsborough	25	Kathleen Paquette	Rep	Manchester (Ward 5)	2024
Hillsborough	25	Kathy Staub	Dem	Manchester (Ward 5)	2022
Hillsborough	26	Brian Cole	Rep	Manchester (Ward 7)	2022
Hillsborough	26	Patrick Long (Note: Long previously served in the state house from 2006–2012.)	Dem	Manchester (Ward 7)	2014
Hillsborough	27	Mary Murphy	Rep	Deering, Francestown	2024
Hillsborough	28	Travis Corcoran	Rep	Weare	2022
Hillsborough	28	Keith Erf	Rep	Weare	2018
Hillsborough	29	Joe Alexander	Rep	Goffstown	2018
Hillsborough	29	Henry Giasson	Rep	Goffstown	2024
Hillsborough	29	Sherri Reinfurt	Rep	Goffstown	2024
Hillsborough	29	Vacant			2025
Hillsborough	30	Riché Colcombe	Rep	Antrim, Bennington, Hillsborough, Windsor	2022
Hillsborough	30	Jim Creighton	Rep	Antrim, Bennington, Hillsborough, Windsor	2020
Hillsborough	30	Jim Fedolfi	Rep	Antrim, Bennington, Hillsborough, Windsor	2016
Hillsborough	31	Molly Howard	Dem	Greenfield, Hancock	2022
Hillsborough	32	Diane Kelley	Rep	New Ipswich, Temple, Wilton	2020
Hillsborough	32	Jim Kofalt	Rep	New Ipswich, Temple, Wilton	2020
Hillsborough	32	Shane Sirois	Rep	New Ipswich, Temple, Wilton	2022
Hillsborough	33	Peter Leishman (Note: Leishman previously served in the state house from 1996–2002 and 2006–2010.)	Dem	Peterborough, Sharon	2011
Hillsborough	33	Jonah Wheeler	Dem	Peterborough, Sharon	2022
Hillsborough	34	Daniel LeClerc	Dem	Amherst	2022
Hillsborough	34	Stephanie Grund	Dem	Amherst	2024
Hillsborough	34	Daniel Veilleux	Dem	Amherst	2020
Hillsborough	35	Kat McGhee	Dem	Hollis	2018
Hillsborough	35	Liz Barbour	Rep	Hollis	2024
Hillsborough	36	John Suiter	Rep	Brookline, Greenville, Mason	2024
Hillsborough	36	Diane Pauer	Rep	Brookline, Greenville, Mason	2020
Hillsborough	37	Megan Murray	Dem	Amherst, Milford	2018
Hillsborough	38	Ralph Boehm	Rep	Hudson, Litchfield	2004
Hillsborough	38	Kimberly Rice (Note: Rice previously served in the state house from 2014–2020.)	Rep	Hudson, Litchfield	2024
Hillsborough	39	Vacant		Manchester (Wards 6, 8–9)	
Hillsborough	39	Mark Warden	Rep	Manchester (Wards 6, 8–9)	2010
Hillsborough	40	Vacant		Manchester (Wards 1, 3, 10–12)	2026
Hillsborough	40	Mark MacKenzie (Note: MacKenzie previously served in the state house from 2016–2018.)	Dem	Manchester (Wards 1, 3, 10–12)	2022
Hillsborough	40	Trinidad Tellez	Dem	Manchester (Wards 1, 3, 10–12)	2022
Hillsborough	40	Erin Kerwin	Dem	Manchester (Wards 1, 3, 10–12)	2024
Hillsborough	41	Lilly Foss	Dem	Manchester (Wards 2, 4–5, 7)	2024
Hillsborough	41	Vacant		Manchester (Wards 2, 4–5, 7)	
Hillsborough	41	Karen Hegner	Dem	Manchester (Wards 2, 4–5, 7)	2024
Hillsborough	42	Keith Ammon (Note: Ammon previously served in the state house from 2014–2018.)	Rep	Lyndeborough, Mont Vernon, New Boston	2020
Hillsborough	42	Gerald Griffin (Note: Griffin previously served in the state house from 2016–2018.)	Rep	Lyndeborough, Mont Vernon, New Boston	2020
Hillsborough	42	Lisa Post	Rep	Lyndeborough, Mont Vernon, New Boston	2020
Hillsborough	43	Gary L. Daniels	Rep	Milford	1990
Hillsborough	43	Paul Dargie	Dem	Milford	2024
Hillsborough	43	Peter Petrigno	Dem	Milford	2016
Hillsborough	43	Vanessa Sheehan	Rep	Milford	2020
Hillsborough	44	Ross Berry	Rep	Goffstown, Weare	2020
Hillsborough	44	Lisa Mazur	Rep	Goffstown, Weare	2022
Hillsborough	45	Jack Flanagan	Rep	Brookline, Greenville, Hollis, Mason	2010
Merrimack	1	Ricky Devoid	Rep	Boscawen	2024
Merrimack	2	Gregory Hill (Note: Hill previously served in the state house from 2010–2012.)	Rep	Northfield	2014
Merrimack	3	Ernesto Gonzalez	Rep	Franklin	2024
Merrimack	3	Bryan Morse	Rep	Franklin	2024
Merrimack	4	Jose Cambrils	Rep	Canterbury, Loudon	2020
Merrimack	4	Michael Moffett (Note: Moffett previously served in the state house from 2016–2018.)	Rep	Canterbury, Loudon	2020
Merrimack	5	Louise Andrus	Rep	Andover, Danbury, Hill, Salisbury, Webster	2020
Merrimack	5	Deborah Aylward	Rep	Andover, Danbury, Hill, Salisbury, Webster	2022
Merrimack	6	Tom Schamberg (Note: Schamberg previously served in the state house from 2012–2014.)	Dem	Sutton, Wilmot	2018
Merrimack	7	Karen Ebel	Dem	New London, Newbury	2012
Merrimack	7	Gregory Sargent	Dem	New London, Newbury	2024
Merrimack	8	Tony Caplan	Dem	Bradford, Henniker, Warner	2020
Merrimack	8	Eileen Kelly	Dem	Bradford, Henniker, Warner	2024
Merrimack	8	Stephanie Payeur	Dem	Bradford, Henniker, Warner	2022
Merrimack	9	Eleana Colby	Dem	Bow, Hopkinton	2024
Merrimack	9	Muriel Hall	Dem	Bow, Hopkinton	2021
Merrimack	9	David Luneau	Dem	Bow, Hopkinton	2014
Merrimack	9	James Newsom	Dem	Bow, Hopkinton	2024
Merrimack	10	Stephen Boyd	Rep	Dunbarton, Hooksett	2020
Merrimack	10	John Leavitt (Note: Leavitt previously served in the state house from 2016–2018.)	Rep	Dunbarton, Hooksett	2020
Merrimack	10	Yury Polozov	Rep	Dunbarton, Hooksett	2022
Merrimack	10	Thomas Walsh	Rep	Dunbarton, Hooksett	2012
Merrimack	11	Matthew Pitaro	Rep	Allenstown	2024
Merrimack	12	Peter Mehegan	Rep	Pembroke	2024
Merrimack	12	Brian Seaworth (Note: Seaworth previously served in the state house from 2010–2012.)	Rep	Pembroke	2014
Merrimack	13	Cyril Aures	Rep	Chichester, Pittsfield	2022
Merrimack	13	Clayton Wood	Rep	Chichester, Pittsfield	2022
Merrimack	14	Dan McGuire (Note: McGuire previously served in the state house from 2010–2016.)	Rep	Epsom	2022
Merrimack	15	Tracy Bricchi	Dem	Concord (Ward 1)	2024
Merrimack	16	Connie Lane	Dem	Concord (Ward 2)	2018
Merrimack	17	Beth Richards	Dem	Concord (Ward 3)	2016
Merrimack	18	James MacKay (Note: MacKay previously served in the state house from 2000–2008.)	Dem	Concord (Ward 4)	2010
Merrimack	19	Mary Jane Wallner	Dem	Concord (Ward 5)	1980
Merrimack	20	Eric Gallager	Dem	Concord (Ward 6)	2020
Merrimack	21	Timothy Soucy (Note: Soucy previously served in the state house from 2008–2010.)	Dem	Concord (Ward 7)	2012
Merrimack	22	James Roesener	Dem	Concord (Ward 8)	2022
Merrimack	23	Merryl Gibbs	Dem	Concord (Ward 9)	2022
Merrimack	24	Matthew Hicks	Dem	Concord (Ward 10)	2022
Merrimack	25	James Thibault	Rep	Franklin, Northfield	2024
Merrimack	26	Alvin See	Rep	Andover, Boscawen, Canterbury, Danbury, Hill, Loudon, Salisbury, Webster	2022
Merrimack	27	Raymond Plante	Rep	Allenstown, Dunbarton, Epsom, Hooksett	2024
Merrimack	27	Carol McGuire	Rep	Allenstown, Dunbarton, Epsom, Hooksett	2008
Merrimack	28	Jim Snodgrass	Dem	Concord (Wards 1–3)	2024
Merrimack	29	Kristina Schultz	Dem	Concord (Wards 4, 9–10)	2017
Merrimack	30	Gary Woods	Dem	Concord (Wards 5–8)	2024
Rockingham	1	Scott Bryer	Rep	Northwood, Nottingham	2024
Rockingham	1	James Guzofski	Rep	Northwood, Nottingham	2024
Rockingham	1	Paul Tudor	Rep	Northwood, Nottingham	2020
Rockingham	2	Jason Osborne	Rep	Auburn, Candia, Deerfield	2014
Rockingham	2	James Spillane	Rep	Auburn, Candia, Deerfield	2014
Rockingham	2	Kevin Verville	Rep	Auburn, Candia, Deerfield	2016
Rockingham	3	Mary Ford	Rep	Chester	2020
Rockingham	4	Cindy Bennett	Rep	Raymond	2024
Rockingham	4	Mike Drago	Rep	Raymond	2022
Rockingham	4	Brian Nadeau	Rep	Raymond	2024
Rockingham	5	Mark Vallone (Note: Vallone previously served in the state house from 2018–2020.)	Dem	Epping	2022
Rockingham	5	Vacant		Epping	
Rockingham	6	Eric Turer	Dem	Brentwood	2022
Rockingham	7	Laurence Miner	Rep	Fremont	2024
Rockingham	8	Sayra DeVito	Rep	Danville	2024
Rockingham	9	Donald Selby	Rep	Sandown	2024
Rockingham	9	Vicki Wilson	Rep	Sandown	2024
Rockingham	10	Michael Cahill	Dem	Newfields, Newmarket	2012
Rockingham	10	Toni Weinstein	Dem	Newfields, Newmarket	2024
Rockingham	10	Ellen Read	Dem	Newfields, Newmarket	2016
Rockingham	11	Julie Gilman	Dem	Exeter	2016
Rockingham	11	Gaby Grossman	Dem	Exeter	2018
Rockingham	11	Vacant		Exeter	
Rockingham	11	Mark Paige	Dem	Exeter	2020
Rockingham	12	Allison Knab	Dem	Stratham	2022
Rockingham	12	Zoe Manos	Dem	Stratham	2022
Rockingham	13	Charles Foote	Rep	Derry	2022
Rockingham	13	Phyllis Katsakiores (Note: Katsakiores previously served in the state house from 1982–2012.)	Rep	Derry	2014
Rockingham	13	Erica Layon	Rep	Derry	2020
Rockingham	13	David Love	Rep	Derry	2018
Rockingham	13	David Milz	Rep	Derry	2012
Rockingham	13	Jodi Nelson	Rep	Derry	2021
Rockingham	13	Stephen Pearson	Rep	Derry	2018
Rockingham	13	John Potucek (Note: Katsakiores previously served in the state house from 2014–2016.)	Rep	Derry	2018
Rockingham	13	Katherine Prudhomme O'Brien (Note: Prudhomme O'Brien previously served in the state house from 2014–2016.)	Rep	Derry	2018
Rockingham	13	Richard Tripp (Note: Tripp previously served in the state house from 2016–2018.)	Rep	Derry	2020
Rockingham	14	Pam Brown	Rep	East Kingston, Kingston	2024
Rockingham	14	Kenneth Weyler (Note: Weyler previously served in the state house from 1990–2008.)	Rep	East Kingston, Kingston	2010
Rockingham	15	Joseph Guthrie	Rep	Hampstead	2014
Rockingham	15	Lilli Walsh	Rep	Hampstead	2022
Rockingham	16	Tom Dolan	Rep	Londonderry	2018
Rockingham	16	Ron Dunn	Rep	Londonderry	2022
Rockingham	16	David Lundgren	Rep	Londonderry	2010
Rockingham	16	Wayne MacDonald	Rep	Londonderry	2020
Rockingham	16	Sherman Packard	Rep	Londonderry	1990
Rockingham	16	Kristine Perez	Rep	Londonderry	2022
Rockingham	16	Douglas Thomas	Rep	Londonderry	2018
Rockingham	17	Katelyn Kuttab	Rep	Windham	2022
Rockingham	17	Robert Lynn	Rep	Windham	2020
Rockingham	17	Charles McMahon	Rep	Windham	2002
Rockingham	17	Daniel Popovici-Muller	Rep	Windham	2022
Rockingham	18	Debra DeSimone	Rep	Atkinson	2008
Rockingham	18	Jay Markel	Rep	Atkinson	2024
Rockingham	19	Susan Porcelli	Rep	Hampton Falls, Kensington	2022
Rockingham	20	Robert Harb	Rep	Newton, Plaistow, South Hampton	2018
Rockingham	20	Charles Melvin	Rep	Newton, Plaistow, South Hampton	2018
Rockingham	20	James Summers	Rep	Newton, Plaistow, South Hampton	2022
Rockingham	21	Jennifer Mandelbaum	Dem	Newington, Portsmouth (Ward 1)	2024
Rockingham	22	Vacant		New Castle, Portsmouth (Ward 5)	
Rockingham	23	Jim Maggiore	Dem	North Hampton	2018
Rockingham	24	Vacant		Greenland, Rye	2026
Rockingham	24	Dennis Malloy (Note: Malloy previously served in the state house from 2012–2014.)	Dem	Greenland, Rye	2016
Rockingham	25	Lorie Ball	Rep	Salem	2022
Rockingham	25	Tanya Donnelly	Rep	Salem	2022
Rockingham	25	Vacant		Salem	2025
Rockingham	25	John Janigian	Rep	Salem	2016
Rockingham	25	Dennis Mannion	Rep	Salem	2022
Rockingham	25	Valerie McDonnell	Rep	Salem	2022
Rockingham	25	Joseph Sweeney (Note: Sweeney previously served in the state house from 2012–2016.)	Rep	Salem	2020
Rockingham	25	John Sytek (Note: Sytek previously served in the state house from 1990–1996.)	Rep	Salem	2010
Rockingham	25	Susan Vandecasteele	Rep	Salem	2020
Rockingham	26	Buzz Scherr	Dem	Portsmouth (Ward 3)	2024
Rockingham	27	Gerry Ward	Dem	Portsmouth (Ward 4)	2012
Rockingham	28	Carrie Sorensen	Dem	Portsmouth (Ward 2)	2024
Rockingham	29	Erica de Vries	Dem	Hampton	2024
Rockingham	29	Nicholas Bridle	Rep	Hampton	2024
Rockingham	29	Chris Muns (Note: Muns previously served in the state house from 2012–2014.)	Dem	Hampton	2022
Rockingham	29	Mike Edgar	Dem	Hampton	2024
Rockingham	30	Matt Sabourin	Rep	Seabrook	2024
Rockingham	30	Aboul Khan	Rep	Seabrook	2020
Rockingham	31	Jess Edwards	Rep	Auburn, Chester, Candia, Deerfield	2018
Rockingham	31	Terry Roy	Rep	Auburn, Chester, Candia, Deerfield	2018
Rockingham	32	Melissa Litchfield	Rep	Brentwood, Danville, Fremont	2024
Rockingham	33	Alexis Simpson (Note: Simpson previously served in the state house from 2014–2016.)	Dem	Exeter, Newfields, Newmarket, Stratham	2020
Rockingham	34	Mark Pearson	Rep	East Kingston, Hampstead, Kingston	2016
Rockingham	35	Julius Soti	Rep	Londonderry, Windham	2018
Rockingham	36	JD Bernardy	Rep	Hampton Falls, Kensington, Newton, Plaistow, South Hampton	2020
Rockingham	37	David Meuse	Dem	New Castle, Newington, Portsmouth (Wards 1 & 5)	2018
Rockingham	38	Peggy Balboni	Dem	Greenland, North Hampton, Rye	2022
Rockingham	39	Ned Raynolds	Dem	Portsmouth (Wards 2, 3, 4)	2022
Rockingham	40	Linda McGrath	Rep	Hampton, Seabrook	2024
Strafford	1	Susan DeLemus	Rep	Farmington	2024
Strafford	1	Robley Hall	Rep	Farmington	2024
Strafford	2	Glenn Bailey	Rep	Milton, Rochester (Ward 5)	2016
Strafford	2	Claudine Burnham	Rep	Milton, Rochester (Ward 5)	2010
Strafford	2	Michael Granger	Rep	Milton, Rochester (Ward 5)	2022
Strafford	3	Susan DeRoy	Rep	New Durham, Middleton	2024
Strafford	4	Heath Howard	Dem	Barrington, Strafford	2022
Strafford	4	Cassandra Levesque	Dem	Barrington, Strafford	2018
Strafford	4	Len Turcotte (Note: Turcotte previously served in the state house from 2014–2018.)	Rep	Barrington, Strafford	2020
Strafford	5	Thomas Kaczynski (Note: Kaczynski previously served in the state house from 2014–2018.)	Rep	Rochester (Ward 1)	2020
Strafford	6	Denise DeDe-Poulin	Rep	Rochester (Ward 2)	2024
Strafford	7	Aidan Ankarberg	Ind (Note: Ankarberg served as a Republican from 2020–2024 and as an independent from 2024–present.)	Rochester (Ward 3)	2020
Strafford	8	Samuel Farrington	Rep	Rochester (Ward 4)	2024
Strafford	9	Amy Malone	Dem	Rochester (Ward 6)	2024
Strafford	10	Timothy Horrigan (Note: Horrigan previously served in the state house from 2008–2010.)	Dem	Durham	2010
Strafford	10	Wayne Burton (Note: Burton previously served in the state house from 1984–1986, 1988–1990, and 2014–2018.)	Dem	Durham	2024
Strafford	10	Loren Selig	Dem	Durham	2022
Strafford	10	Marjorie Smith (Note: Smith previously served in the state house from 1996–2010.)	Dem	Durham	2012
Strafford	11	Erik Johnson	Dem	Dover (Ward 4), Lee, Madbury	2024
Strafford	11	Thomas Southworth	Dem	Dover (Ward 4), Lee, Madbury	2012
Strafford	11	Janet Wall	Dem	Dover (Ward 4), Lee, Madbury	1986
Strafford	12	Myles England	Dem	Rollinsford, Somersworth	2024
Strafford	12	Billie Butler	Dem	Rollinsford, Somersworth	2025
Strafford	12	Wayne Pearson	Dem	Rollinsford, Somersworth	2024
Strafford	12	John Stone	Dem	Rollinsford, Somersworth	2024
Strafford	13	Peter Bixby	Dem	Dover (Ward 6)	2012
Strafford	14	Peter B. Schmidt	Dem	Dover (Ward 1)	2002
Strafford	15	Alice Wade	Dem	Dover (Ward 2)	2024
Strafford	16	Gary Gilmore	Dem	Dover (Ward 3)	2024
Strafford	17	Jessica LaMontagne	Dem	Dover (Ward 5)	2022
Strafford	18	Michael Harrington (Note: Harrington previously served in the state house from 2000–2004.)	Rep	Barrington, Middleton, New Durham, Strafford	2014
Strafford	19	David Walker	Rep	Rochester (Wards 1, 2, 3, 4, 6)	2024
Strafford	19	John Larochelle	Dem	Rochester (Wards 1, 2, 3, 4, 6)	2024
Strafford	19	Kelley Potenza	Rep	Rochester (Wards 1, 2, 3, 4, 6)	2022
Strafford	20	Allan Howland	Dem	Dover (Ward 4), Durham, Lee, Madbury	2022
Strafford	21	Luz Bay	Dem	Dover (Wards 1, 2, 3, 5, 6)	2022
Strafford	21	Geoffrey Smith	Dem	Dover (Wards 1, 2, 3, 5, 6)	2022
Strafford	21	Seth Miller	Dem	Dover (Wards 1, 2, 3, 5, 6)	2024
Sullivan	1	Brian Sullivan	Dem	Grantham	2017
Sullivan	2	William Palmer	Dem	Plainfield, Cornish	2022
Sullivan	3	Skip Rollins	Rep	Charlestown, Newport, Unity	2012
Sullivan	3	Steven D. Smith	Rep	Charlestown, Newport, Unity	2010
Sullivan	3	Walter Spilsbury	Rep	Charlestown, Newport, Unity	2020
Sullivan	4	Judy Aron	Rep	Acworth, Goshen, Langdon, Lempster, Washington	2018
Sullivan	5	George Grant	Rep	Croydon, Springfield, Sunapee	2024
Sullivan	6	John Cloutier	Dem	Claremont	1992
Sullivan	6	Dale Girard	Rep (Note: Girard served as a Democrat from 2024–2026 and as a Republican from 2026–present.)	Claremont	2024
Sullivan	6	Wayne Hemingway	Rep	Claremont	2024
Sullivan	7	Margaret Drye	Rep	Charlestown, Cornish, Newport, Plainfield, Unity	2022
Sullivan	8	Hope Damon	Dem	Acworth, Claremont, Croydon, Goshen, Langdon, Lempster, Springfield, Sunapee, Washington	2022
Sullivan	8	Michael Aron	Rep	Acworth, Claremont, Croydon, Goshen, Langdon, Lempster, Springfield, Sunapee, Washington	2024

== See also ==
- List of New Hampshire General Courts
