= 2020 United States Senate election in New Hampshire =

- November 3, 2020
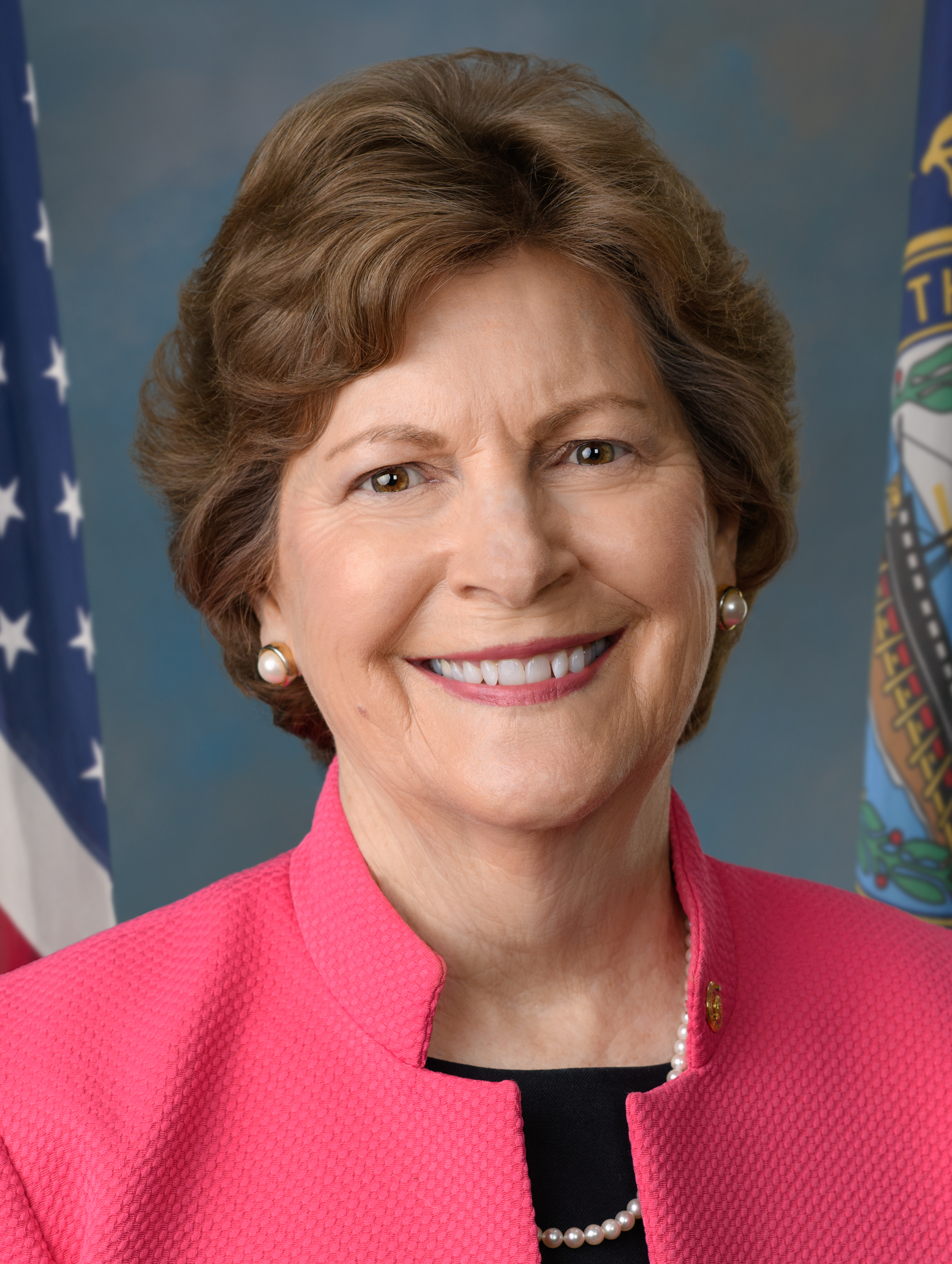

Nominee	Jeanne Shaheen	Bryant "Corky" Messner
Party	Democratic	Republican
Popular vote	450,778	326,229
Percentage	56.63%	40.99%
- Shaheen: 40–50% 50–60% 60–70% 70–80% 80–90% >90% Messner: 40–50% 50–60% 60–70% 70–80% No votes
U.S. senator before election
Jeanne Shaheen
Democratic
Elected U.S. Senator
Jeanne Shaheen
Democratic

The 2020 United States Senate election in New Hampshire was held on November 3, 2020, to elect a member of the United States Senate to represent the State of New Hampshire, concurrently with the 2020 U.S. presidential election, as well as other elections to the United States Senate, elections to the United States House of Representatives and various state and local elections. Incumbent Democratic Senator Jeanne Shaheen won reelection to a third term after comfortably defeating Republican nominee Bryant Messner by 15.6 points and sweeping every single county in the state. This marked the first Senate election since 1972 in which the Democrat carried Belknap County.

Shaheen's final margin outperformed Democratic presidential nominee Joe Biden in the concurrent presidential election by around 8 percentage points, while carrying two counties that voted for Donald Trump.

The primary election was held on September 8, 2020. This was the first New Hampshire U.S. Senate race since 2010 where any candidate won every county.

== Democratic primary ==
=== Candidates ===
==== Nominee ====
- Jeanne Shaheen, incumbent U.S. senator

==== Eliminated in primary ====
- Tom Alciere, former Republican state representative
- Paul J. Krautmann, former dentist

=== Endorsements ===
Jeanne Shaheen

Federal officials

- Kirsten Gillibrand, U.S. senator (NY); former 2020 presidential candidate
- Amy Klobuchar, U.S. senator (MN); former 2020 presidential candidate
- Elizabeth Warren, U.S. senator (MA); former 2020 presidential candidate

Local officials

- Jim Bouley, Concord mayor
- Joyce Craig, Manchester mayor
- Jim Donchess, Nashua mayor
- Andrew Hosmer, Laconia mayor

Organizations

- Brady Campaign
- Council for a Livable World
- EMILY's List
- End Citizens United
- Feminist Majority PAC
- Humane Society of the United States Legislative Fund
- J Street PAC
- Joint Action Committee for Political Affairs
- League of Conservation Voters
- National Committee to Preserve Social Security and Medicare
- National Organization for Women
- Natural Resources Defense Council Action Fund
- Planned Parenthood Action Fund
- Population Connection
- Sierra Club
- Women's Political Committee

=== Results ===
Results by county: Shaheen—≥90%

Democratic primary results
Party	Candidate	Votes	%
Democratic	Jeanne Shaheen (incumbent)	142,012	93.88%
Democratic	Paul Krautman	5,914	3.91%
Democratic	Tom Alciere	2,992	1.98%
Republican	Don Bolduc (write-in)	199	0.13%
Republican	Bryant Messner (write-in)	137	0.09%
Republican	Andy Martin (write-in)	11	0.0%
Republican	Gerard Beloin (write-in)	3	0.0%
Total votes		151,268	100.0%

== Republican primary ==
=== Candidates ===
==== Nominee ====
- Bryant Messner, corporate attorney and former U.S. Army soldier

==== Eliminated in primary ====
- Gerard Beloin, ski instructor
- Don Bolduc, former U.S. Army Special Forces brigadier general
- Andy Martin, journalist and perennial candidate

==== Withdrew ====
- Bill O'Brien, former speaker of the New Hampshire House of Representatives

==== Declined ====
- Kelly Ayotte, former U.S. senator and former attorney general of New Hampshire
- Al Baldasaro, state representative (endorsed Bill O'Brien)
- Scott Brown, U.S. Ambassador to New Zealand and Samoa, former U.S. senator from Massachusetts, 2014 Republican nominee for the U.S. Senate in New Hampshire
- Eddie Edwards, former police chief of South Hampton, former chief of the New Hampshire State Division of Liquor Enforcement, and nominee for New Hampshire's 1st congressional district in 2018 (accepted executive state appointment)
- Corey Lewandowski, President Donald Trump's former campaign manager
- Jay Lucas, businessman
- Chris Sununu, incumbent governor of New Hampshire (ran for re-election)

=== Endorsements ===
Don Bolduc

Federal officials

- Tom Cotton, U.S. senator from Arkansas and former U.S. Representative (AR-04) (2013–2015)
- Bob Smith, former U.S. senator from New Hampshire (1990–2003) and U.S. Representative (NH-01) (1985–1990)
- Mike Waltz, U.S. representative (FL-06)
- Thomas E. White, former U.S. Secretary of the Army (2001–2004)

State officials

- Kevin Avard, former state senator (2014–2018) and state representative (2010–2012)
- Jim Coburn, former state representative (2004–2006) and Republican nominee in the 2006 New Hampshire gubernatorial election
- Susan DeLemus, former state representative (2010–2012, 2014–2016)
- Shaun Doherty, former state representative (2008–2012)
- William Fowler, state representative
- Bob Giuda, state senator and former state representative (2001–2007) and state House deputy majority leader (2003–2004)
- Gary Hopper, state representative
- Joseph Kenney, former executive councilor (2014–2019) and state senator (2003–2009)
- Gary Lambert, former state senator (2010–2012)
- Tim Merlino, state representative
- Michael Moffett, former state representative (2016–2018)
- Reed Panasiti, state representative
- Terry Roy, state representative
- Doug Scamman, former state representative (2004–2010) and state House speaker
- David Testerman, state representative
- Joshua Whitehouse, former state representative (2014–2016)
- Raymond Wieczorek, former executive councilor (2002–2012) and mayor of Manchester (1990–2000)

Organizations

- SEAL PAC
- Senate Conservatives Fund

Individuals

- Jeb Bush, 2016 Republican presidential candidate and former governor of Florida (1999–2007)
- Jack Kimball, former New Hampshire Republican Party chair (2011)
Bryant Messner

Federal officials

- Rand Paul, U.S. senator from Kentucky
- Donald Trump, 45th president of the United States

State officials

- Dennis Acton, state representative
- Joe Alexander, state representative
- Alan Bershtein, state representative
- Regina Birdsell, state senator and former state representative (2010–2014)
- Tom Dolan, state representative
- Fred Doucette, state representative
- Jess Edwards, state representative
- Aboul Khan, state representative
- Tony Lekas, state representative
- Norman Major, state representative
- Charles McMahon, state representative
- Chuck Morse, state senator, state Senate minority leader, and former state Senate president (2013–2018) and acting Governor (2017)
- Bill O'Brien, Republican candidate in the 2020 U.S. Senate election in New Hampshire and former state representative (2004–2006, 2008–2016) and state House speaker (2010–2012)
- Mark Pearson, state representative
- Stephen Pearson, state representative
- Kim Rice, state representative
- Steve Schmidt, former state representative (2010–2018)
- Thomas Walsh, state representative
- Kenneth Weyler, state representative
- Michael Yakubovich, state representative

Organizations

- National Association for Gun Rights
- Tea Party Express

Individuals

- John Campbell, former U.S. Army Vice Chief of Staff (2013–2014)

=== Polling ===
Poll source	Date(s) administered	Sample size (Note: Key: A – all adults RV – registered voters LV – likely voters V – unclear)	Margin of error	Don Bolduc	Corey Lewandowski	Bryant Messner	Bill O'Brien	Other	Undecided
University of New Hampshire	August 28 – September 1, 2020	703 (LV)	± 3.7%	31%	–	52%	–	0% (Note: "Some other candidate" with 0%)	17%
Saint Anselm College	August 15–17, 2020	475 (RV)	± 4.5%	29%	–	31%	–	4% (Note: "Someone else" with 4%)	37%
The Tarrance Group (Note: Poll conducted for Corky Messner.)	July 12–14, 2020	401 (LV)	± 5%	27%	–	39%	–	–	–
Remington Research Group (Note: Poll sponsored by Don Bolduc)	June 21–23, 2020	800 (LV)	–	8%	–	17%	–	–	73%
	April 2, 2020	O'Brien withdraws from the race							
	December 31, 2019	Lewandowski announces he will not run							
Emerson College	September 6–9, 2019	379 (RV)	± 5.0%	9%	29%	4%	7%	–	56%
Vote Adjustments/WMUR	September 5–6, 2019	402 (LV)	± 4.2%	9%	29%	2%	6%	–	49%
	September 4, 2019	Messner announces his candidacy							
Remington Research (R)	August 12–14, 2019	200 (RV)	–	21%	21%	2%	8%	–	47%
Fabrizio (R) (Note: Poll sponsored by Lewandowski)	August 11–12, 2019	400 (LV)	–	11%	30%	–	10%	–	–

=== Results ===
Results by county: Messner—50–60% Messner—40–50% Bolduc—40–50% Bolduc—50–60%

Republican primary results
Party	Candidate	Votes	%
Republican	Bryant Messner	69,801	50.26%
Republican	Don Bolduc	58,749	42.30%
Republican	Andy Martin	6,443	4.64%
Republican	Gerard Beloin	3,098	2.23%
Democratic	Jeanne Shaheen (write-in)	771	0.56%
Democratic	Tom Alciere (write-in)	7	0.0%
Democratic	Paul Krautmann (write-in)	7	0.0%
Total votes		138,876	100.0%

== Other candidates ==
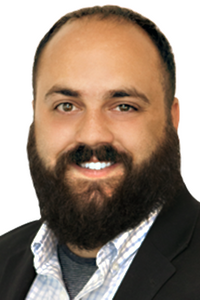
Justin O'Donnell, the Libertarian nominee

=== Libertarian Party ===
==== Nominee ====
- Justin O'Donnell, Libertarian nominee for New Hampshire's 2nd congressional district in 2018, qualified for general election ballot by petition on September 2, 2020

=== Bull Moose Party ===
==== Did not qualify ====
- Thomas Sharpe V, firefighter and U.S. Navy veteran

== General election ==
=== Debate ===
2020 New Hampshire United States Senate election debate
No.	Date	Host	Moderator	Link	Democratic	Republican	Libertarian
Key: P Participant A Absent N Not invited I Invited W Withdrawn							
Key: P Participant A Absent N Not invited I Invited W Withdrawn					Jeanne Shaheen	Bryant Messner	Justin O'Donnell
1	Oct. 20, 2020	WMUR-TV	Laura Knoy; Annie Ropeik		P	P	N

=== Predictions ===
Source	Ranking	As of
The Cook Political Report	Safe D	October 29, 2020
Inside Elections	Safe D	October 28, 2020
Sabato's Crystal Ball	Likely D	November 2, 2020
Daily Kos	Safe D	October 30, 2020
Politico	Likely D	November 2, 2020
RCP	Lean D	October 23, 2020
DDHQ	Safe D	November 3, 2020
538	Safe D	November 2, 2020
Economist	Safe D	November 2, 2020

=== Additional general election endorsements ===
Jeanne Shaheen (D)

Unions

- International Federation of Professional and Technical Engineers
- National Education Association
- State Employees Association of New Hampshire

Organizations

- Everytown for Gun Safety

=== Polling ===
View source data.

Poll source	Date(s) administered	Sample size	Margin of error	Jeanne Shaheen (D)	Bryant Messner (R)	Other / Undecided
American Research Group	October 26–28, 2020	600 (LV)	± 4%	57%	40%	3% (Note: O'Donnell (L) with 0%; Undecided with 3%)
University of New Hampshire	October 24–28, 2020	864 (LV)	± 3.3%	54%	43%	2% (Note: O'Donnell (L) with 2%; "Other" and Undecided with 0%)
Saint Anselm College	October 23–26, 2020	1,018 (LV)	± 3.1%	54%	39%	8% (Note: O'Donnell (L) with 2%; "Someone else" with 1%; Undecided with 5%)
YouGov/UMass Lowell	October 16–26, 2020	757 (LV)	± 4.5%	57%	38%	5% (Note: "Another candidate" with 1%; Undecided with 4%)
University of New Hampshire	October 9–12, 2020	899 (LV)	± 3.3%	55%	40%	6% (Note: O'Donnell (L) with 2%; "Another Candidate" with 0%; Undecided with 4%)
Suffolk University	October 8–12, 2020	500 (LV)	± 4.4%	51%	36%	13% (Note: O'Donnell (L) and "Refused" with 2%; "Other" with 0%; Undecided with 8%)
Saint Anselm College	October 1–4, 2020	1,147 (LV)	± 2.9%	53%	38%	8% (Note: O'Donnell (L) with 4%; "Someone else" with 2%; Undecided with 5%)
Emerson College	September 30 – October 1, 2020	700 (LV)	± 3.6%	55%	40%	5% (Note: "Someone else" with 2%; Undecided with 3%)
American Research Group	September 25–28, 2020	600 (LV)	± 4%	56%	40%	4% (Note: O'Donnell (L) with 0%; Undecided with 4%)
University of New Hampshire	September 24–28, 2020	972 (LV)	± 3.1%	54%	41%	5% (Note: O'Donnell (L) with 3%; "Another Candidate" with 0%; Undecided with 2%)
YouGov/UMass Lowell	September 17–25, 2020	657 (LV)	± 4.6%	56%	37%	7% (Note: "Another candidate" with 1%; Undecided with 6%)
University of New Hampshire	August 28 – September 1, 2020	1,889 (LV)	± 2.3%	54%	36%	9% (Note: O'Donnell (L) with 3%; Undecided with 6%)
University of New Hampshire	July 16–28, 2020	1,893 (LV)	± 2.2%	54%	35%	12% (Note: "Another candidate" with 1%; Undecided with 11%)
University of New Hampshire	June 18–22, 2020	932 (LV)	± 2.8%	50%	37%	13% (Note: "Another candidate" with 0%; Undecided with 13%)
University of New Hampshire	May 14–18, 2020	788 (LV)	± 3.2%	52%	34%	14% (Note: "Another candidate" with 1%; Undecided with 13%)
University of New Hampshire	February 19–25, 2020	576 (RV)	± 4.1%	52%	28%	21% (Note: "Another candidate" with 4%; Undecided with 17%)

Hypothetical polling

with Don Bolduc

Poll source	Date(s) administered	Sample size	Margin of error	Jeanne Shaheen (D)	Don Bolduc (R)	Other / Undecided
University of New Hampshire	August 28 – September 1, 2020	1,889 (LV)	± 2.3%	53%	37%	10% (Note: O'Donnell (L) with 4%; Undecided with 6%)
University of New Hampshire	July 16–28, 2020	1,893 (LV)	± 2.2%	54%	35%	10% (Note: "Another candidate" with 0%; Undecided with 10%)
University of New Hampshire	June 18–22, 2020	932 (LV)	± 2.8%	51%	39%	11% (Note: "Another candidate" with 1%; Undecided with 10%)
University of New Hampshire	May 14–18, 2020	788 (LV)	± 3.2%	50%	39%	11%
University of New Hampshire	February 19–25, 2020	576 (RV)	± 4.1%	49%	30%	22% (Note: "Another candidate" with 5%; Undecided with 17%)
Remington Research (R)	August 12–14, 2019	427 (RV)	± 4.7%	47%	42%	11%
Gravis Marketing	August 2–6, 2019	505 (RV)	± 4.4%	51%	38%	11% (Note: Undecided with 11%)

with Corey Lewandowski

Poll source	Date(s) administered	Sample size	Margin of error	Jeanne Shaheen (D)	Corey Lewandowski (R)	Other / Undecided
American Research Group	December 12–16, 2019	539 (RV)	± 4.2%	58%	35%	7%
Emerson College	November 22–26, 2019	1,184 (RV)	± 2.8%	52%	40%	8%
American Research Group	September 20–24, 2019	560 (RV)	± 4.1%	56%	34%	10%
Emerson College	September 6–9, 2019	1,041 (RV)	± 3.0%	49%	39%	12%
Remington Research (R)	August 12–14, 2019	427 (RV)	± 4.7%	50%	37%	–

with Bill O'Brien

Poll source	Date(s) administered	Sample size	Margin of error	Jeanne Shaheen (D)	Bill O'Brien (R)	Other	Undecided
University of New Hampshire	February 19–25, 2020	576 (RV)	± 4.1%	51%	30%	5%	14%
Gravis Marketing	August 2–6, 2019	505 (RV)	± 4.4%	52%	39%	–	9%

with Chris Sununu

Poll source	Date(s) administered	Sample size	Margin of error	Jeanne Shaheen (D)	Chris Sununu (R)	Undecided
Emerson College	February 21–22, 2019	910 (RV)	± 3.2%	44%	44%	12%
YouGov/UMass Amherst	February 7–15, 2019	600 (RV)	± 4.8%	45%	42%	10%

with Kelly Ayotte

Poll source	Date(s) administered	Sample size	Margin of error	Jeanne Shaheen (D)	Kelly Ayotte (R)	Undecided
YouGov/UMass Amherst	February 7–15, 2019	600 (RV)	± 4.8%	41%	36%	20%

with Generic Democrat and Generic Republican

Poll source	Date(s) administered	Sample size	Margin of error	Generic Democrat	Generic Republican	Other	Undecided
Saint Anselm College	August 15–17, 2020	1,042 (RV)	± 3%	49%	44%	2%	4%
Saint Anselm College	Jun 13–16, 2020	1,072 (RV)	± 3%	46%	43%	2%	8%
Saint Anselm College	Apr 23–27, 2020	820 (RV)	± 3.4%	49%	42%	3%	6%

=== Results ===
United States Senate election in New Hampshire, 2020
Party	Candidate	Votes	%	±%
Democratic	Jeanne Shaheen (incumbent)	450,778	56.63%	+5.17%
Republican	Bryant "Corky" Messner	326,229	40.99%	−7.22%
Libertarian	Justin O'Donnell	18,421	2.32%	N/A
Write-in		486	0.06%	–0.27%
Total votes		795,914	100.0%	
Democratic hold				

==== By county ====
By county

County	Jeanne Shaheen Democratic		Bryant Messner Republican		Justin O'Donnell Libertarian		Write-in		Margin		Total votes
County	#	%	#	%	#	%	#	%	#	%	Total votes
Belknap	18,704	49.15	18,536	48.71	765	2.01	46	0.12	168	0.44	38,051
Carroll	17,670	53.61	14,694	44.58	578	1.75	16	0.05	2,976	9.03	32,958
Cheshire	26,750	63.03	15,690	36.97	1,122	2.64	33	0.08	11,060	26.06	42,440
Coös	8,752	53.57	7,222	44.21	362	2.22	0	0.00	1,530	9.37	16,336
Grafton	34,043	63.77	18,092	33.89	1,212	2.27	39	0.07	15,951	29.88	53,386
Hillsborough	129,100	56.50	93,607	40.97	5,630	2.46	137	0.06	35,493	15.53	228,474
Merrimack	52,343	58.74	34,687	38.92	2,031	2.28	52	0.06	17,656	19.81	89,113
Rockingham	105,818	53.72	86,937	44.14	4,112	2.09	94	0.05	18,881	9.59	196,961
Strafford	44,415	60.94	26,465	36.31	1,947	2.67	61	0.08	17,950	24.63	72,888
Sullivan	13,183	54.58	10,299	42.64	662	2.75	8	0.03	2,884	11.94	24,152
Totals	450,778	56.64	326,229	40.99	18,421	2.31	486	0.06	124,549	15.65	795,914

Counties that flipped from Republican to Democratic

- Belknap (largest municipality: Laconia)
- Hillsborough (largest municipality: Manchester)
- Rockingham (largest municipality: Derry)

==== By congressional district ====
Shaheen won both congressional districts.

District	Shaheen	Messner	Representative
1st	56%	42%	Chris Pappas
2nd	57%	40%	Annie Kuster

== See also ==
- 2020 New Hampshire elections

== Notes ==
Partisan clients

Voter samples
