= 2018 United States House of Representatives elections in New Hampshire =

- November 6, 2018

All 2 New Hampshire seats to the United States House of Representatives
	Majority party	Minority party
Party	Democratic	Republican
Last election	2	0
Seats won	2	0
Seat change	Steady	Steady
Popular vote	311,242	248,986
Percentage	54.53%	43.62%
Swing	▲7.57%	▼0.49%

Democratic
40–50%
50–60%
60–70%
70–80%
80–90%
90–100%
Republican
40–50%
50–60%
60–70%
70–80%
90–100%

The 2018 United States House of Representatives elections in New Hampshire were held on November 6, 2018, to elect the two U.S. representatives from the state of New Hampshire, one from each of the state's two congressional districts. The elections coincided with other elections to the House of Representatives, elections to the United States Senate and various state and local elections.

Following the 2018 elections, the Democratic Party retained both of New Hampshire's House seats in Congress, and thus maintained control of New Hampshire's entire congressional delegation.

== Overview ==
Results of the 2018 United States House of Representatives elections in New Hampshire by district:

District	Democratic		Republican		Others		Total		Result
District	Votes	%	Votes	%	Votes	%	Votes	%	Result
District 1	155,884	53.56%	130,996	45.01%	4,159	1.43%	291,039	100.0%	Democratic hold
District 2	155,358	55.54%	117,990	42.18%	6,357	2.27%	279,705	100.0%	Democratic hold
Total	311,242	54.53%	248,986	43.62%	10,516	1.84%	570,744	100.0%	

== District 1 ==
2018 New Hampshire's 1st congressional district election
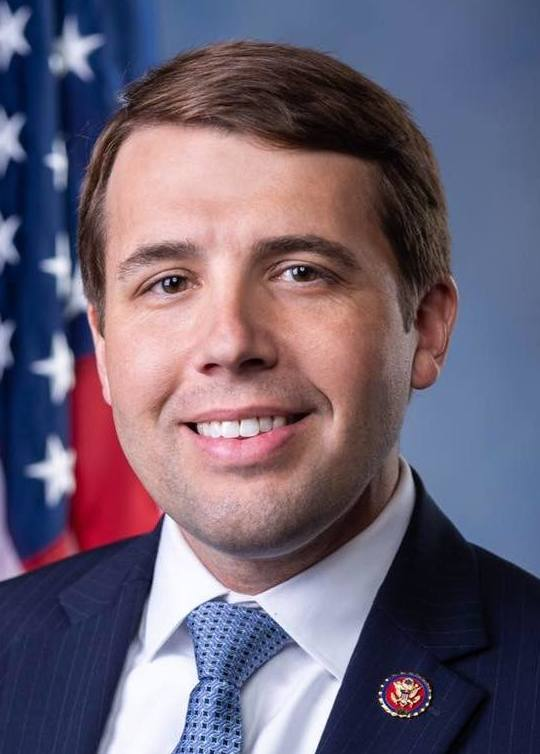

Nominee	Chris Pappas	Eddie Edwards
Party	Democratic	Republican
Popular vote	155,884	130,996
Percentage	53.6%	45.0%
- Municipality results Pappas: 40–50% 50–60% 60–70% 70–80% Edwards: 40–50% 50–60% 60–70% 70–80%
U.S. Representative before election
Carol Shea-Porter
Democratic
Elected U.S. Representative
Chris Pappas
Democratic

The 1st district covers the southeastern part of the state and consists of three general areas: Greater Manchester, the Seacoast and the Lakes Region. The incumbent going into the election was Democrat Carol Shea-Porter, who had represented the district since 2017, and previously from 2007 to 2011, and 2013 to 2015. She was elected with 44% of the vote in 2016, defeating Republican incumbent Frank Guinta. She did not run for reelection in 2018.

=== Democratic primary ===
==== Candidates ====
===== Nominee =====
- Chris Pappas, Executive Councilor of New Hampshire for the 4th District

===== Lost in primary =====
- Naomi Andrews, former aide to Carol Shea-Porter
- Paul Cardinal, businessman
- Mark MacKenzie, state representative and former president of the New Hampshire AFL-CIO
- William Martin
- Deaglan McEachern, businessman
- Mindi Messmer, state representative
- Terence M. O'Rourke, current Rochester City Attorney; former Assistant United States Attorney and Assistant County Attorney; Iraq War veteran (no relation to Beto O'Rourke)
- Levi Sanders, son of U.S. Senator Bernie Sanders
- Lincoln Soldati, former mayor of Somersworth and former Strafford County Attorney
- Maura Sullivan, former Assistant to the Secretary of Defense for Public Affairs, former U.S. Marine Corps Officer and Iraq War veteran

===== Declined =====
- Jackie Cilley, state representative and candidate for governor in 2012
- Terie Norelli, state representative and former Speaker of the New Hampshire House of Representatives
- Carol Shea-Porter, incumbent representative
- David Watters, state senator

==== Endorsements ====
Mark MacKenzie

Organization

- Communication Workers of America Local 1400
- National Association of Letter Carriers Branch 44
- Plumbers and Steamfitters Local 131
- Service Employees International Union Local 560
- Sheet Metal Workers' International Association Local 7
- United Food and Commercial Workers
- United Steelworkers
Terence O'Rourke

Local politicians

- Josh Denton, Portsmouth City Councilor
Chris Pappas

Federal officials

- Maggie Hassan (D-NH) US Senator
- Ann Kuster (D-NH-2)
- Jeanne Shaheen (D-NH) US Senator

State officials

- Kevin Cavanaugh, State Senator, District 16
- Lou D'Allesandro State Senator, District 20
- Donna Soucy, State Senator, District 18
- Andru Volinsky, Executive Councilor, District 2
- David Watters, State Senator, District 4

Local officials

- Joyce Craig, Mayor of Manchester
- Dana Hilliard, Mayor of Somersworth
- Caroline McCarley, Mayor of Rochester

Organizations

- Gay & Lesbian Victory Fund
- National Education Association - New Hampshire
- Planned Parenthood Action Fund
- State Employees Association (SEIU Local 1984)
Maura Sullivan

Organizations

- EMILY's List
- VoteVets.org
Levi Sanders

Federal officials

- Ro Khanna (D-CA-17)

Governors

- Phil Murphy (D-NJ)

State legislators

- Kevin de León, former California State Senator from District 24 (2010–2018), former President pro tempore (2014–2018), and Candidate for Senator of California in 2018

Individuals

- Rob Quist, singer and candidate for Montana's At-Large Congressional 2017 special election
Naomi Andrews

Federal officials

- Carol Shea-Porter (D-NH-1)

==== Debate ====
2018 New Hampshire 1st congressional district democratic primary debate
No.	Date	Host	Moderator	Link	Democratic	Democratic	Democratic	Democratic	Democratic	Democratic	Democratic	Democratic	Democratic	Democratic	Democratic
Key: P Participant A Absent N Not invited I Invited W Withdrawn															
Key: P Participant A Absent N Not invited I Invited W Withdrawn					Naomi Andrews	Paul Cardinal	Mark MacKenzie	William Martin	Deaglan McEachern	Mindi Messmer	Terence O'Rouke	Chris Pappas	Levi Sanders	Lincoln Soldati	Maura Sullivan
1	Aug. 13, 2018	New Hampshire Democratic Party	Raymond Buckley		P	P	P	P	P	P	P	P	P	P	P

==== Primary results ====
Democratic primary results
Party	Candidate	Votes	%
Democratic	Chris Pappas	26,875	42.2
Democratic	Maura Sullivan	19,313	30.4
Democratic	Mindi Messmer	6,412	9.7
Democratic	Naomi Andrews	4,508	7.1
Democratic	Lincoln Soldati	1,982	3.1
Democratic	Levi Sanders	1,709	2.7
Democratic	Deaglan McEachern	1,141	2.1
Democratic	Mark MacKenzie	746	1.2
Democratic	Terence M. O'Rourke	656	1.0
Democratic	Paul Cardinal	317	0.5
Democratic	William Martin	230	0.4
Total votes		63,619	100.0

=== Republican primary ===
==== Candidates ====
===== Nominee =====
- Eddie Edwards, former Chief of the New Hampshire State Division of Liquor Enforcement and former South Hampton Police Chief

===== Lost in primary =====
- Michael Callis
- Jeff Denaro, contractor
- Andy Martin, perennial candidate
- Andy Sanborn, state senator

==== Withdrew ====
- Bruce Crochetiere, businessman

===== Declined =====
- Dan Innis, state senator and candidate for this seat in 2014
- John Stephen, former commissioner of the New Hampshire Department of Health & Human Services, candidate for this seat in 2002 and 2008 and nominee for governor in 2010

==== Endorsements ====
Eddie Edwards

U.S. Senators

- Rick Santorum, former U.S. Senator Pennsylvania
- Bob Smith, former U.S. Senator from New Hampshire

U.S. Representatives

- Allen West, former U.S. Representative from Florida

State officials

- Jeanie Forrester, former NHGOP Chair

Mayors

- Rudy Giuliani, former New York City mayor

Newspapers

- New Hampshire Union Leader
Andy Sanborn

Federal officials

- Ted Cruz, U.S. Senator from Texas
- Rand Paul, U.S. Senator from Kentucky

State Senators

- Rob Boyce (former)
- Peter Bragdon (former)
- Sam Cataldo (former)
- Tom DeBlois (former)
- Jim Forsythe (former)
- Harold French

Individuals

- Corey Lewandowski, President Donald Trump's former campaign manager

Organizations

- Gun Owners of America

==== Debate ====
2018 New Hampshire 1st congressional district republican primary debate
No.	Date	Host	Moderator	Link	Republican	Republican	Republican	Republican	Republican
Key: P Participant A Absent N Not invited I Invited W Withdrawn									
Key: P Participant A Absent N Not invited I Invited W Withdrawn					Michael Callis	Jeff Denaro	Eddie Edwards	Andy Martin	Andy Sanborn
1	Sep. 6, 2018	New Hampshire Union Leader; Saint Anselm College; WMUR	Adam Sexton		P	P	P	P	P

==== Primary results ====
Republican primary results
Party	Candidate	Votes	%
Republican	Eddie Edwards	23,510	48.0
Republican	Andy Sanborn	20,364	41.6
Republican	Andy Martin	2,072	4.2
Republican	Michael Callis	1,254	2.6
Republican	Jeff Denaro	963	2.0
Republican	Bruce Crochetiere (withdrawn)	766	1.6
Total votes		48,929	100.0

=== Libertarian primary ===
==== Candidates ====
===== Declared =====
- Dan Belforti

=== Independent candidates ===
==== Declared ====
- Eric R. Eastman, Justice Progressive candidate, former state representative, actor and director

=== General election ===
==== Predictions ====
Source	Ranking	As of
The Cook Political Report	Likely D	November 5, 2018
Inside Elections	Lean D	November 5, 2018
Sabato's Crystal Ball	Likely D	November 5, 2018
RCP	Tossup	November 5, 2018
Daily Kos	Lean D	November 5, 2018
538	Likely D	November 7, 2018

==== Debate ====
2018 New Hampshire's 1st congressional district debate
No.	Date	Host	Moderator	Link	Democratic	Republican
Key: P Participant A Absent N Not invited I Invited W Withdrawn						
Key: P Participant A Absent N Not invited I Invited W Withdrawn					Chris Pappas	Eddie Edwards
1	Oct. 29, 2018	New Hampshire Union Leader; Saint Anselm College; WMUR	Adam Sexton		P	P

==== Polling ====
Poll source	Date(s) administered	Sample size	Margin of error	Chris Pappas (D)	Eddie Edwards (R)	Dan Belforti (L)	Undecided
University of New Hampshire	November 1–4, 2018	309	± 5.6%	53%	40%	3%	4%
Emerson College	October 27–29, 2018	570	± 4.3%	48%	46%	–	5%
University of New Hampshire	October 10–18, 2018	265	± 6.0%	46%	37%	4%	13%
Saint Anselm College	October 10–15, 2018	234	± 6.5%	44%	36%	1%	19%
Emerson College	October 10–12, 2018	387	± 5.2%	40%	35%	–	24%
OnMessage Inc. (R-Edwards)	September 25–27, 2018	400	± 4.9%	40%	42%	–	14%
American Research Group	September 21–26, 2018	400	± 5.0%	55%	33%	–	12%

==== Results ====
New Hampshire's 1st congressional district, 2018
Party	Candidate	Votes	%
Democratic	Chris Pappas	155,884	53.6
Republican	Eddie Edwards	130,996	45.0
Libertarian	Dan Belforti	4,048	1.4
n/a	Write-ins	111	0.0
Total votes		291,039	100.0
Democratic hold			

== District 2 ==
2018 New Hampshire's 2nd congressional district election
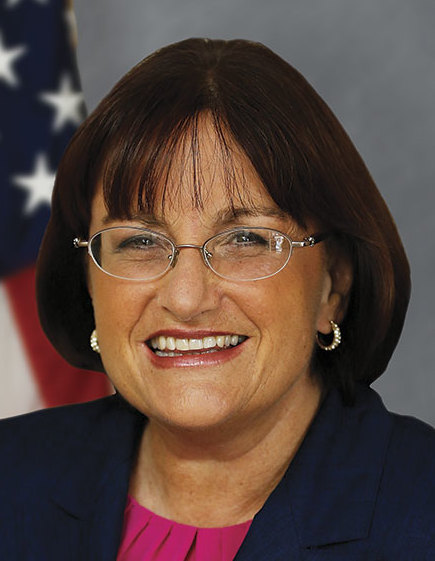

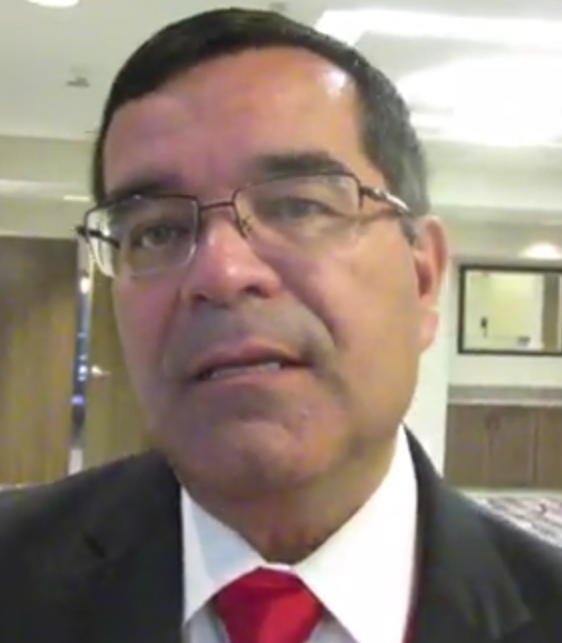
Nominee	Annie Kuster	Steve Negron
Party	Democratic	Republican
Popular vote	155,358	117,990
Percentage	55.5%	42.2%
- Municipality results Kuster: 40–50% 50–60% 60–70% 70–80% 80–90% 90–100% Negron: 40–50% 50–60% 60–70% 70–80% 90–100% No votes
U.S. Representative before election
Ann McLane Kuster
Democratic
Elected U.S. Representative
Ann McLane Kuster
Democratic

The 2nd district covers the western and northern parts of the state and includes the cities of Nashua and Concord. The incumbent was Democrat Ann McLane Kuster, who had represented the district since 2013. She was re-elected with 49.7% of the vote in 2016.

=== Democratic primary ===
==== Candidates ====
- Annie Kuster, incumbent representative

==== Primary results ====
Democratic primary results
Party	Candidate	Votes	%
Democratic	Annie Kuster (incumbent)	55,954	100.0
Total votes		55,954	100.0

=== Republican primary ===
==== Candidates ====
===== Declared =====
- Brian Belanger, businessman
- Gerard Beloin
- Lynne Blankenbeker, former state representative
- Robert Burns, former Hillsborough County Treasurer
- Stewart Levenson, doctor and whistleblower
- Jay Mercer
- Steve Negron, state representative

===== Withdrew =====
- Jack Flanagan, former Majority Leader of the New Hampshire House of Representatives and candidate for this seat in 2016

===== Declined =====
- Josh McElveen, political director and news anchor for WMUR-TV

==== Endorsements ====
Lynne Blankenbeker

Individuals

- Regina Birdsell, state senator
- Susan Brooks, U.S. Representative
- Charles Douglas III, former U.S. Representative
- Jack Flanagan, former New Hampshire House Majority Leader
- Virginia Foxx, U.S. Representative
- Harold French, state senator
- Karen Handel, U.S. Representative
- Cathy McMorris Rodgers, U.S. Representative
- John Reagan, state senator
- Martha Roby, U.S. Representative
- Ann Wagner, U.S. Representative

Organizations

- Maggie's List
- Susan B. Anthony List
Stewart Levenson
- Don Davidson, former Nashua Mayor
- Bernie Streeter, former Nashua Mayor
Steve Negron
- Bob Clegg, former State Senate Majority Leader
- Richard Ferdinando, former state senator
- Scott Hilliard, Merrimack County Sheriff
- Donna Sytek, former New Hampshire House Speaker
- New Hampshire Union Leader

==== Primary results ====
Republican primary results
Party	Candidate	Votes	%
Republican	Steve Negron	11,166	26.0
Republican	Stewart Levenson	10,858	25.3
Republican	Lynne Blankenbeker	9,836	22.9
Republican	Robert Burns	6,811	15.9
Republican	Brian Belanger	2,388	5.6
Republican	Jay Mercer	1,232	2.9
Republican	Gerald Beloin	623	1.5
Total votes		42,914	100.0

=== Libertarian primary ===
==== Candidates ====
===== Declared =====
- Tom Alciere, former Republican state representative and Perennial candidate
- Justin O'Donnell, Libertarian activist, member of the Libertarian National Committee, sales consultant and National Guard veteran

==== Primary results ====
Libertarian primary results
Party	Candidate	Votes	%
Libertarian	Justin O'Donnell	426	74.7
Libertarian	Tom Alciere	144	25.3
Total votes		570	100.0

=== General election ===
==== Predictions ====
Source	Ranking	As of
The Cook Political Report	Safe D	November 5, 2018
Inside Elections	Safe D	November 5, 2018
Sabato's Crystal Ball	Safe D	November 5, 2018
RCP	Likely D	November 5, 2018
Daily Kos	Safe D	November 5, 2018
538	Safe D	November 7, 2018

==== Polling ====
Poll source	Date(s) administered	Sample size	Margin of error	Anne McLane Kuster (D)	Steven Negron (R)	Justin O'Donnell (L)	Other	Undecided
University of New Hampshire	November 1–4, 2018	321	± 5.5%	56%	35%	2%	1%	7%
Emerson College	October 27–29, 2018	569	± 4.3%	52%	40%	–	–	7%
University of New Hampshire	October 10–18, 2018	234	± 6.4%	53%	38%	3%	–	6%
Saint Anselm College	October 10–15, 2018	220	± 6.5%	49%	22%	2%	–	26%
Emerson College	October 10–12, 2018	401	± 5.2%	44%	25%	2%	–	28%
American Research Group	September 21–26, 2018	400	± 5.0%	54%	27%	–	–	19%

==== Results ====
New Hampshire's 2nd congressional district, 2018
Party	Candidate	Votes	%
Democratic	Ann McLane Kuster (incumbent)	155,358	55.5
Republican	Steve Negron	117,990	42.2
Libertarian	Justin O'Donnell	6,206	2.2
n/a	Write-ins	151	0.1
Total votes		279,705	100.0
Democratic hold			

== See also ==
- 2016 United States House of Representatives elections
- 2016 United States elections
