= 2020 New Hampshire elections =

A general election was held in the U.S. state of New Hampshire on November 3, 2020. The election included races for president, U.S. Senate, both of New Hampshire's seats in the United States House of Representatives, governor, the Executive Council of New Hampshire, the New Hampshire Senate, and the New Hampshire House of Representatives.

To vote by mail, registered New Hampshire voters had to request a ballot by November 2, 2020. As of early October, some 163,974 voters had requested mail ballots. Received ballots were processed beginning on October 29, 2020.

== Results summary ==
Democratic nominee Joe Biden carried New Hampshire in the presidential election, defeating incumbent Republican president Donald Trump. Incumbent Democratic U.S. senator Jeanne Shaheen was reelected, and Democratic U.S. representatives Chris Pappas and Annie Kuster also won reelection. Republicans won the gubernatorial race, gained a 4-1 majority on the Executive Council, and won control of both chambers of the New Hampshire General Court.

== Federal offices ==
=== President ===
New Hampshire had four electoral votes in the 2020 United States presidential election. Biden and running mate Kamala Harris won the state over Trump and Mike Pence.

2020 United States presidential election in New Hampshire
Party	Candidate	Running mate	Votes	%
Democratic	Joe Biden	Kamala Harris	424,937	52.71
Republican	Donald Trump	Mike Pence	365,660	45.36
Other parties and write-ins	Various	Various	15,608	1.93
Total			806,205	100.00

=== U.S. Senate ===
Incumbent Democratic senator Jeanne Shaheen won reelection to a third term, defeating Republican nominee Bryant Messner and Libertarian nominee Justin O'Donnell.

2020 United States Senate election in New Hampshire
Party	Candidate	Votes	%
Democratic	Jeanne Shaheen (incumbent)	450,778	56.63
Republican	Bryant Messner	326,229	40.99
Libertarian	Justin O'Donnell	18,421	2.31
Total		795,428	100.00

=== U.S. House of Representatives ===
Both of New Hampshire's U.S. House seats were won by Democratic incumbents.

2020 United States House elections in New Hampshire
District	Winning candidate	Party	Votes	%	Opponent	Party	Votes	%	Result
1st	Chris Pappas (incumbent)	Democratic	205,606	51.32	Matt Mowers	Republican	185,159	46.21	Democratic hold
2nd	Annie Kuster (incumbent)	Democratic	208,289	53.90	Steve Negron	Republican	168,886	43.70	Democratic hold

== State offices ==
=== Governor ===
Incumbent Republican governor Chris Sununu was reelected to a third two-year term, defeating Democratic nominee Dan Feltes and Libertarian nominee Darryl W. Perry.

2020 New Hampshire gubernatorial election
Party	Candidate	Votes	%
Republican	Chris Sununu (incumbent)	516,609	65.12
Democratic	Dan Feltes	264,639	33.36
Libertarian	Darryl W. Perry	11,329	1.43
Write-in	Various	683	0.09
Total		793,260	100.00

=== Executive Council ===
All five seats on the Executive Council of New Hampshire were up for election. Republicans won four seats and Democrats won one, giving Republicans control of the council.

2020 New Hampshire Executive Council election
District	Winning candidate	Party	Votes	%	Opponent	Party	Votes	%	Result
1	Joseph Kenney	Republican	80,073	51.69	Michael J. Cryans (incumbent)	Democratic	74,847	48.31	Republican gain
2	Cinde Warmington	Democratic	79,266	54.44	Jim Beard	Republican	66,325	45.56	Democratic hold
3	Janet Stevens	Republican	85,821	52.40	Mindi Messmer	Democratic	77,971	47.60	Republican hold
4	Ted Gatsas (incumbent)	Republican	78,975	55.64	Mark MacKenzie	Democratic	62,971	44.36	Republican hold
5	Dave Wheeler	Republican	74,622	50.50	Debora Pignatelli (incumbent)	Democratic	73,135	49.50	Republican gain

=== State Senate ===
All 24 seats in the New Hampshire Senate were up for election. Republicans gained four seats, changing the chamber from a 14–10 Democratic majority to a 14–10 Republican majority.

2020 New Hampshire Senate election summary
Party	Votes	%	Seats before	Seats after	Seat change
Republican	384,138	50.2	10	14	▲4
Democratic	381,223	49.8	14	10	▼4
Total	765,361	100.0	24	24	—

=== House of Representatives ===
All 400 seats in the New Hampshire House of Representatives were up for election. Republicans won control of the chamber, gaining a majority over Democrats. Because the New Hampshire House includes many multi-member districts, aggregate vote totals reflect votes cast across multiple district contests rather than a single statewide race.

2020 New Hampshire House of Representatives election summary
Party	Votes	%	Seats before	Seats after	Seat change
Republican	1,319,131	50.89	159	213	▲54
Democratic	1,267,790	48.91	231	187	▼44
Total	2,591,104	100.0	400	400	—

== See also ==
- Elections in New Hampshire
- Politics of New Hampshire
- Political party strength in New Hampshire
- 2020 United States elections
