= John Leavitt (politician) =

American politician

Member of the New Hampshire House of Representatives from the Merrimack 24th district
- In office 2016–2018
- In office 2020 – December 7, 2022
- Succeeded by: Michael Yakubovich

Member of the New Hampshire House of Representatives from the Merrimack 10th district
- Incumbent
- Assumed office December 7, 2022

Personal details
- Party: Republican

John Leavitt is an American politician. He serves as a Republican member for the Merrimack 10th district of the New Hampshire House of Representatives.
