= Alicia Lekas =

American politician

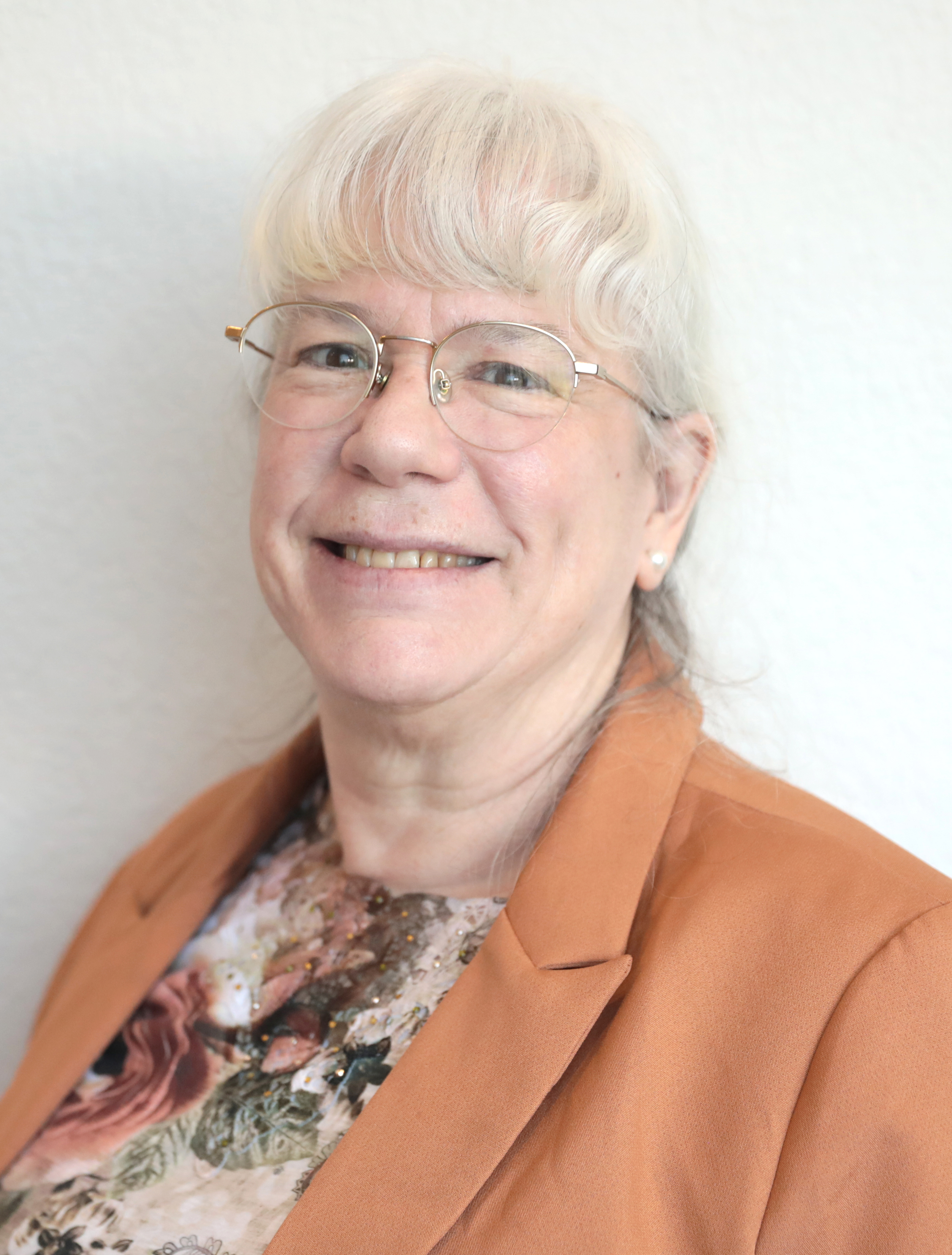
Alicia Lekas in 2022.

Alicia Lekas is an American Republican politician. She serves in the New Hampshire House of Representatives in Hillsborough County - District 38 alongside Tony Lekas.
