= New Hampshire's congressional districts =

U.S. House districts in the state of New Hampshire

Map of New Hampshire's congressional districts from 2023 Interactive map version

New Hampshire is divided into two congressional districts, each represented by a member of the United States House of Representatives.

The districts are currently represented in the 119th United States Congress by two Democrats.

== Current districts and representatives ==
This is a list of United States representatives from New Hampshire, their terms, their district boundaries, and the district political ratings according to the CPVI. The delegation has a total of two members, both Democrats.

Current U.S. representatives from New Hampshire
| District | Member (residence) | Party | Incumbent since | CPVI (2025) | District map |
|---|---|---|---|---|---|
| 1st | Chris Pappas (Manchester) | Democratic | January 3, 2019 | D+2 | |
| 2nd | Maggie Goodlander (Nashua) | Democratic | January 3, 2025 | D+2 | |

== Historical results ==
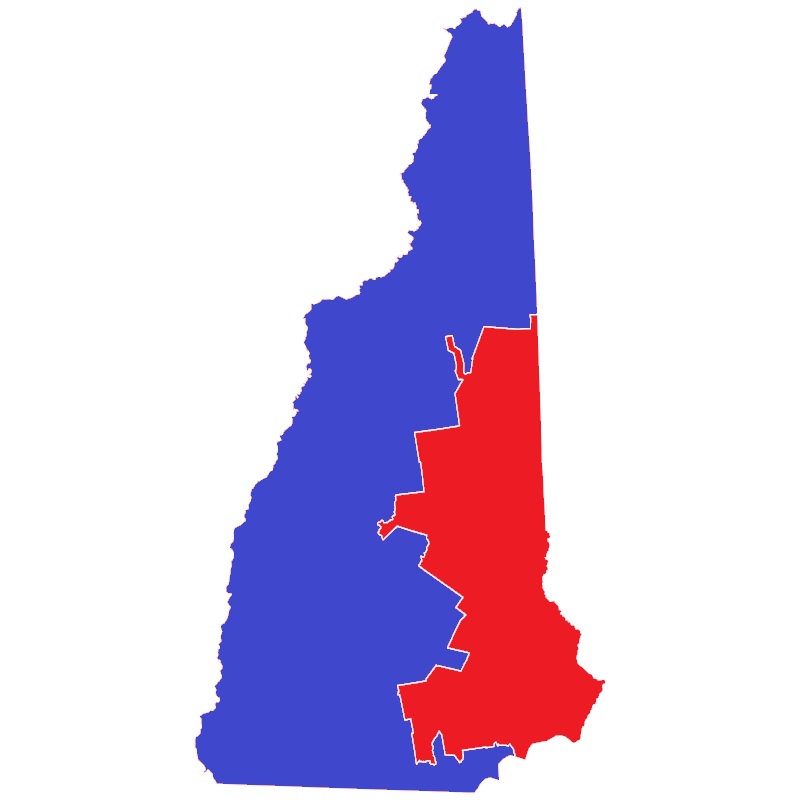
1992

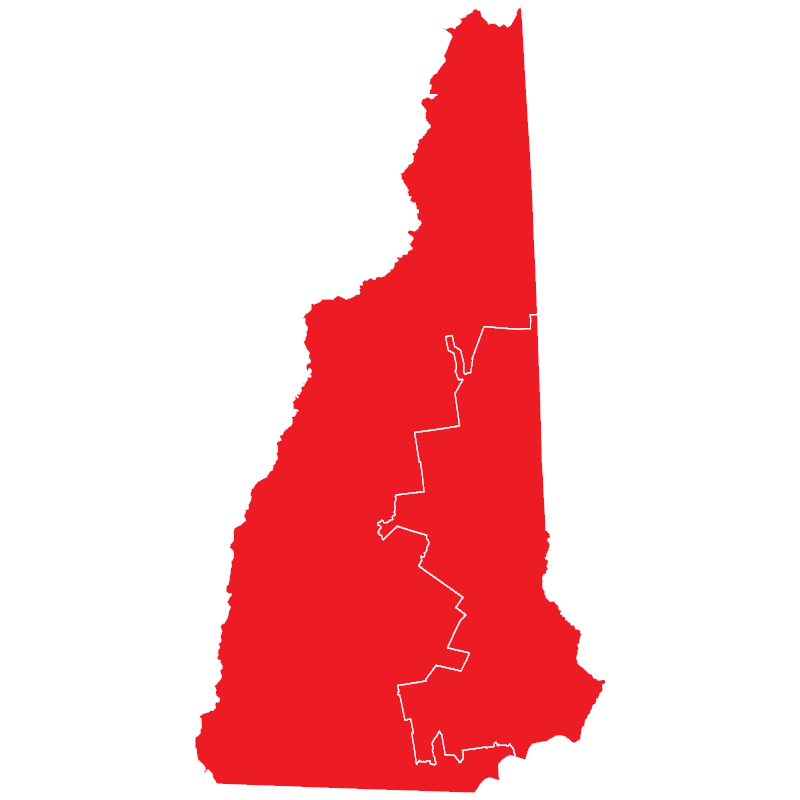
1994

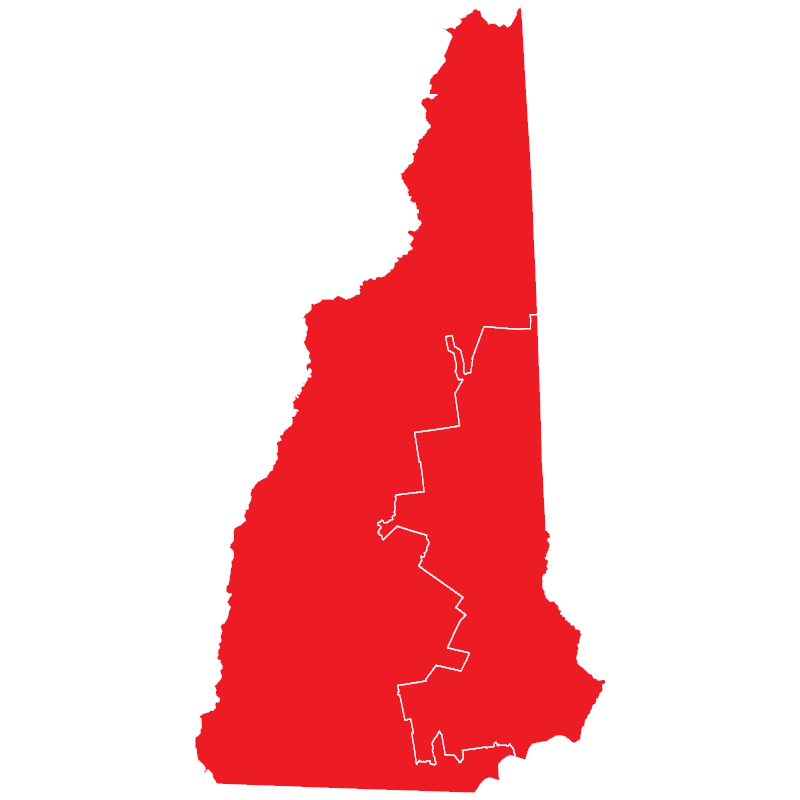
1996

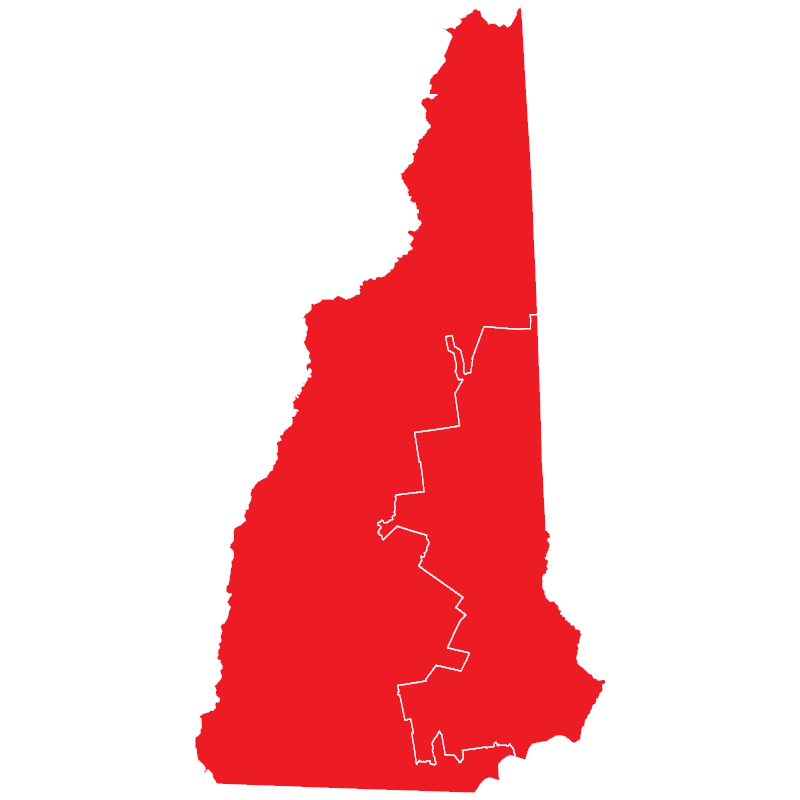
1998

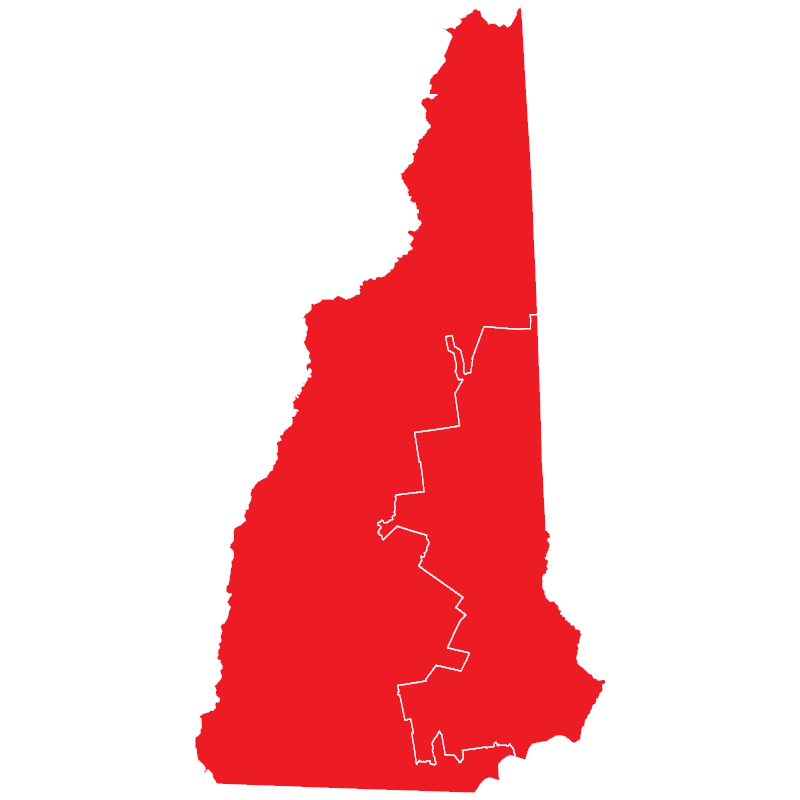
2000

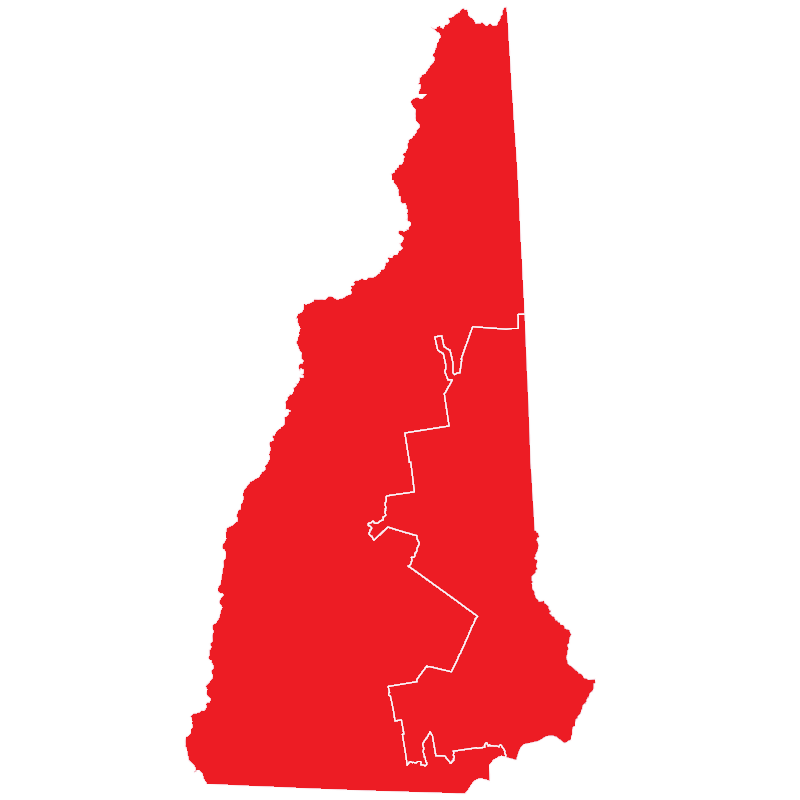
2002

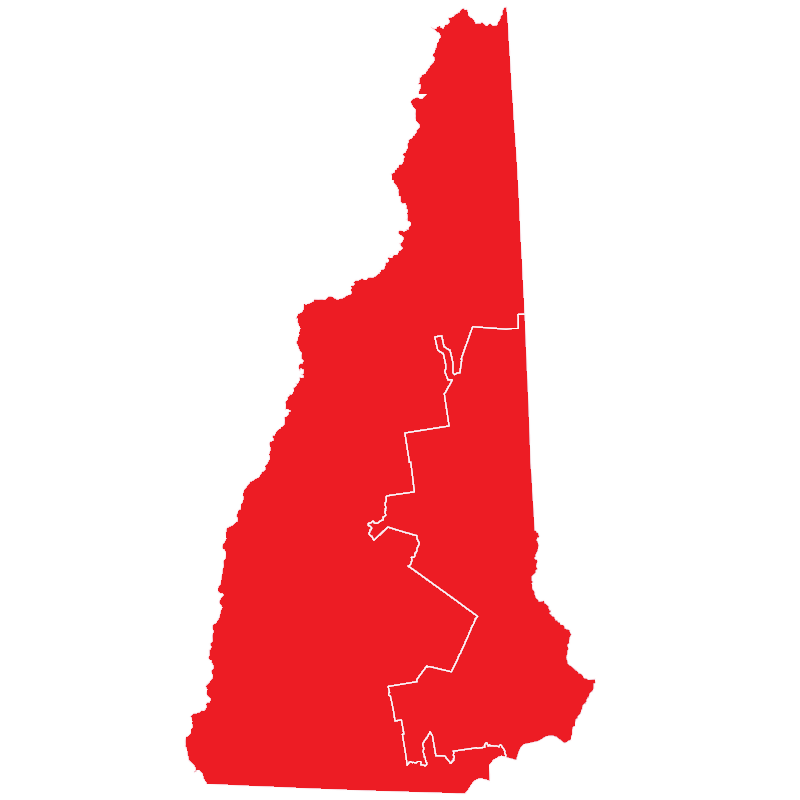
2004

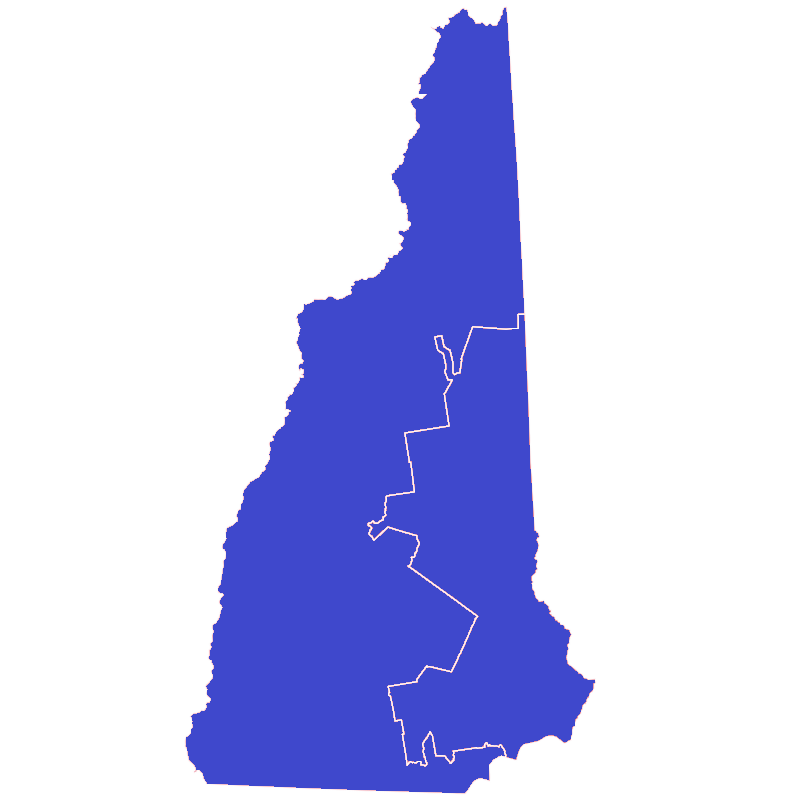
2006

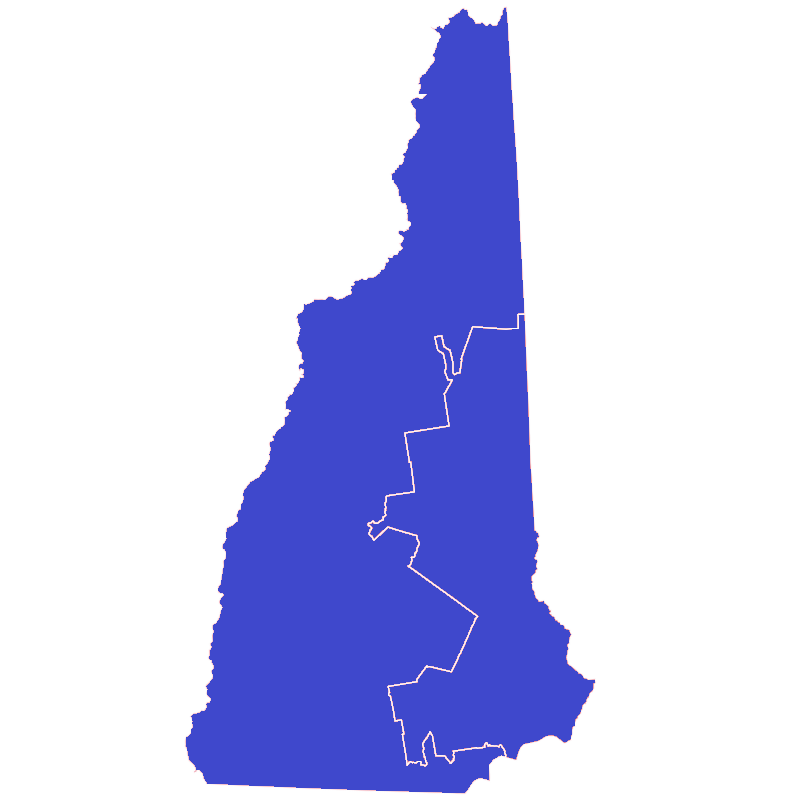
2008

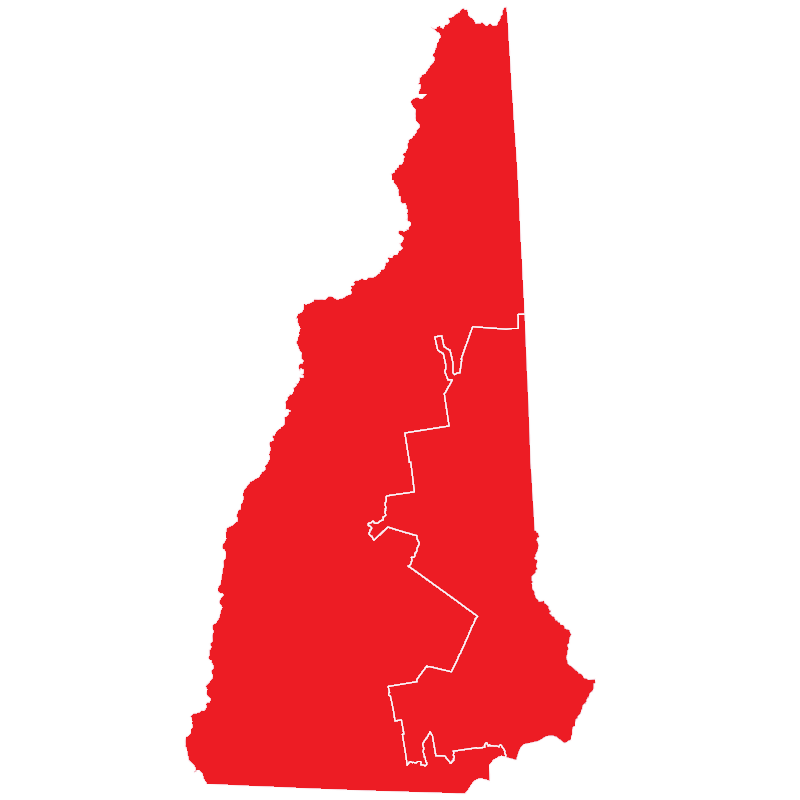
2010

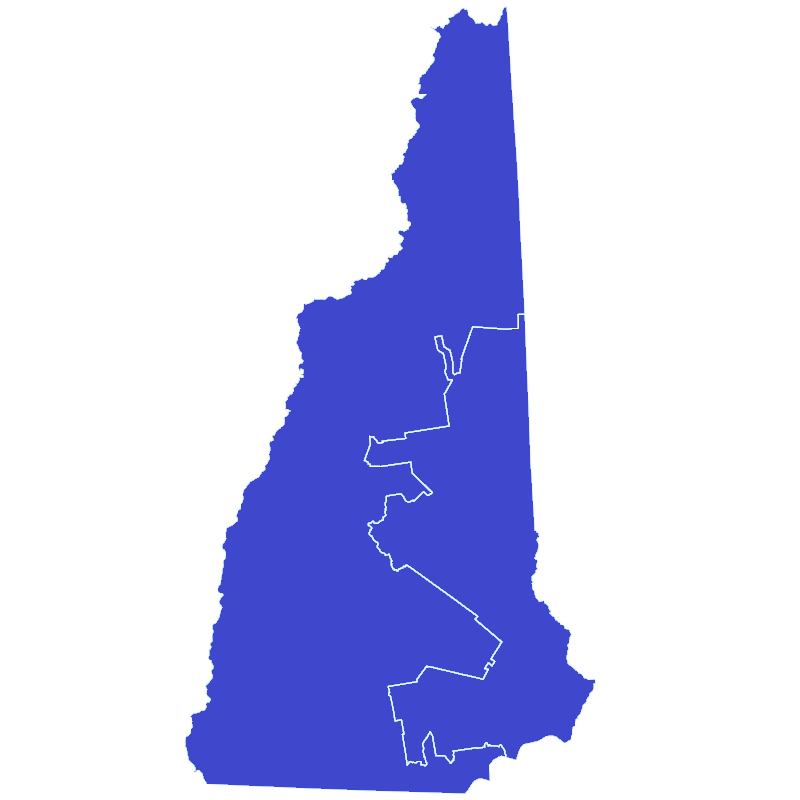
2012

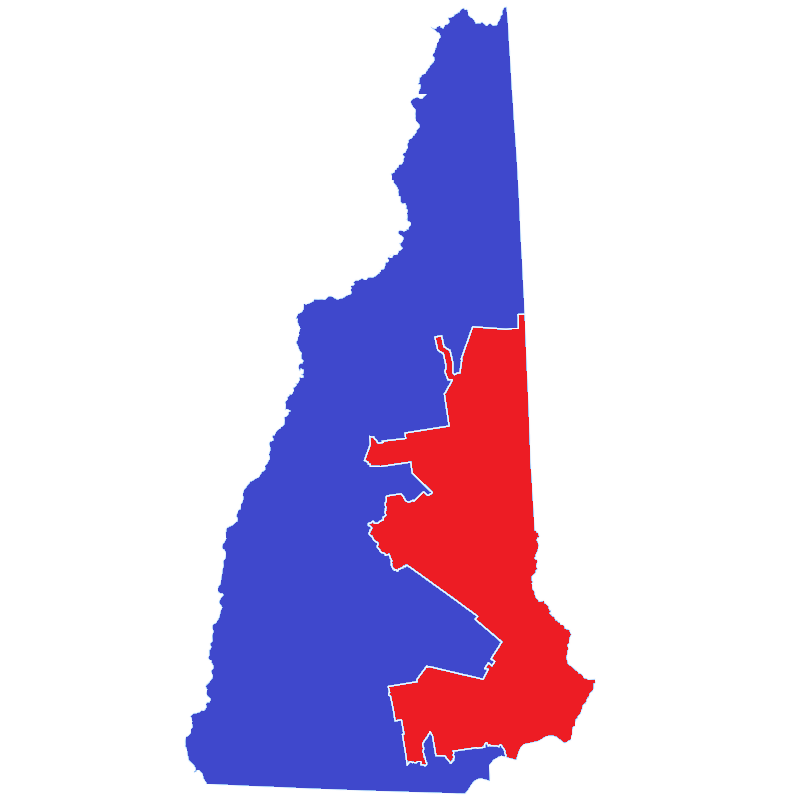
2014

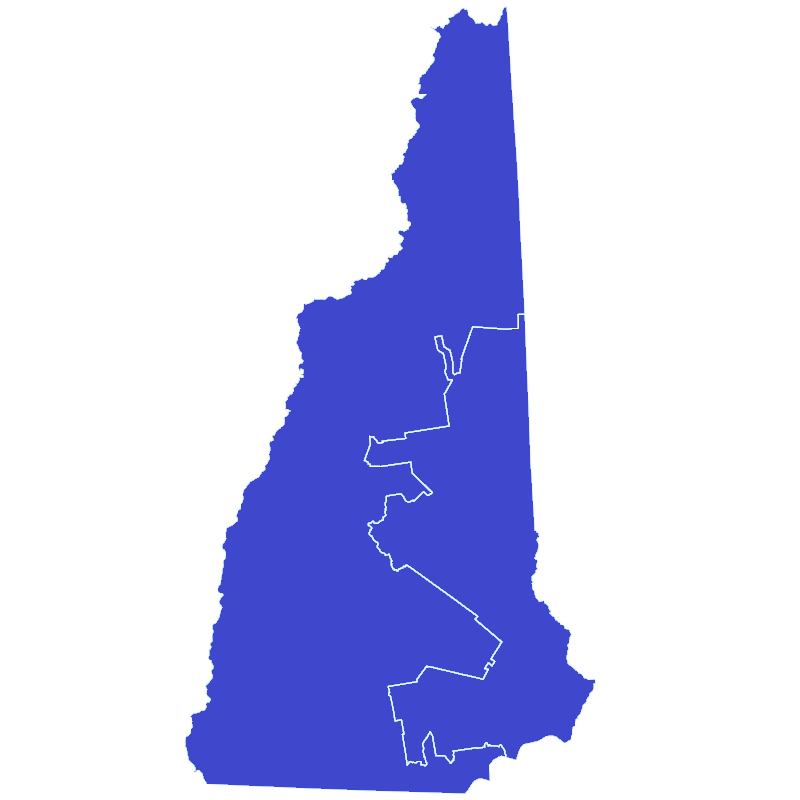
2016

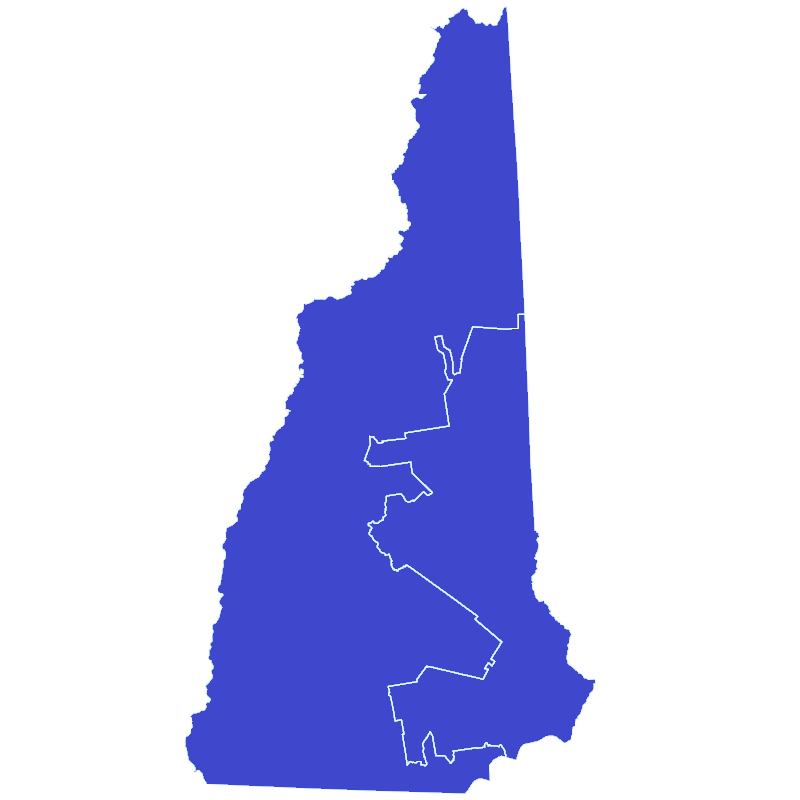
2018

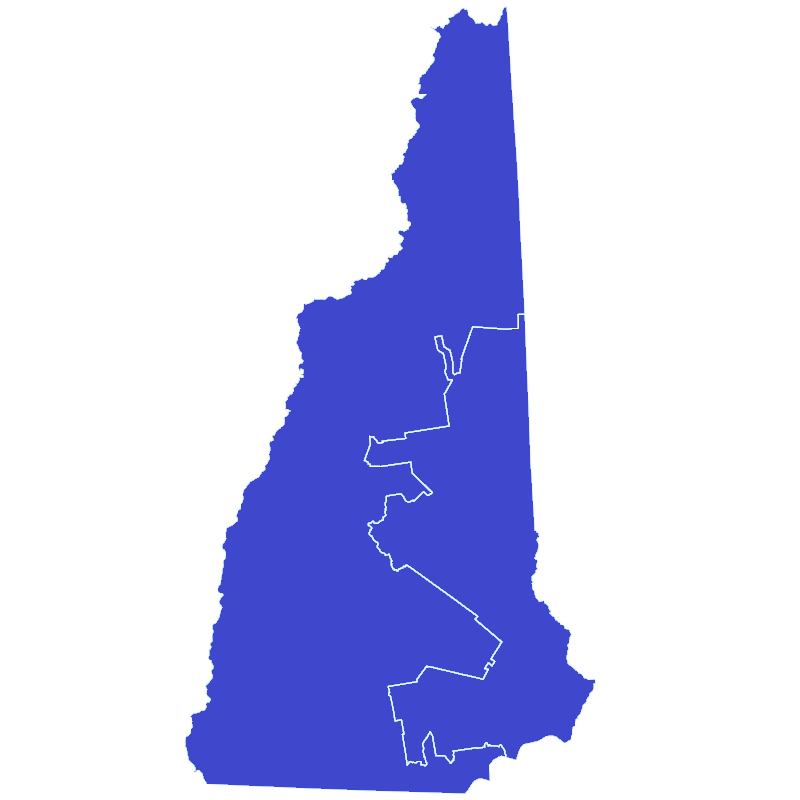
2020

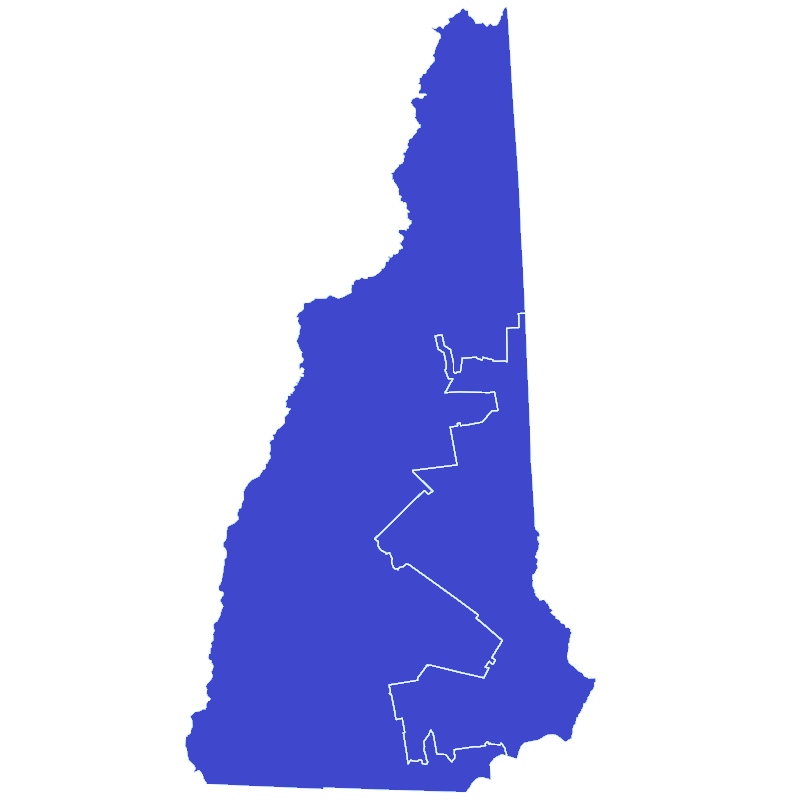
2022

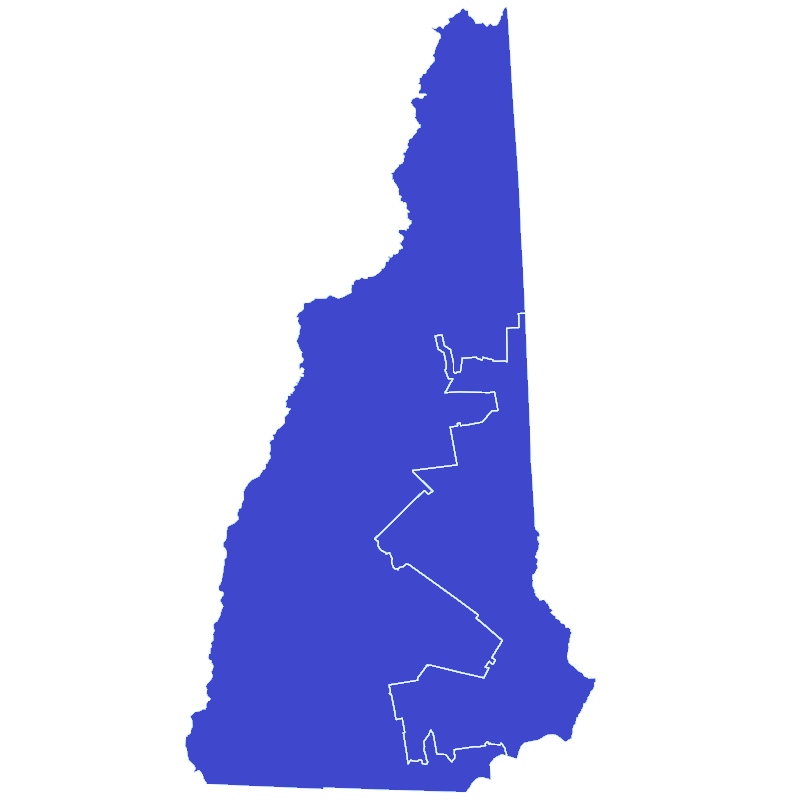
2024

== Historical and present district boundaries ==
Table of United States congressional district boundary maps in the State of New Hampshire, presented chronologically. All redistricting events that took place in New Hampshire between 1973 and 2013 are shown. District numbers are represented by the map fill colors.

| Year | Statewide map |
|---|---|
| 1973–1982 | |
| 1983–1992 | |
| 1993–2002 | |
| 2003–2013 | |
| 2013–2023 | |
| 2023–present | |

== Obsolete districts ==
- New Hampshire's at-large congressional district, (1789–1847)
- New Hampshire's 3rd congressional district, obsolete since the 1880 census
- New Hampshire's 4th congressional district, obsolete since the 1850 census

== See also ==
- New Hampshire's congressional delegations
