= Matthew Hicks =

American politician

Member of the New Hampshire House of Representatives from the Merrimack 24th district
- Incumbent
- Assumed office December 7, 2022
- Preceded by: Michael Yakubovich

Personal details
- Party: Democratic
- Education: Hamilton College (BA); Harvard Graduate School of Education (M.Ed); University of New Hampshire (PhD)

Matthew Hicks is an American politician. He serves as a Democratic member for the Merrimack 24th district of the New Hampshire House of Representatives.
