= Maura Sullivan =

American government official

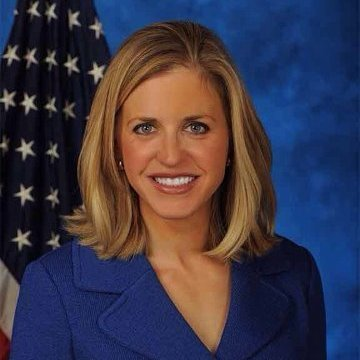
- Official portrait, 2015

Assistant to the Secretary of Defense for Public Affairs
- In office July 15, 2015 – November 2015
- President: Barack Obama
- Preceded by: Brent Colburn
- Succeeded by: Peter Cook

Personal details
- Born: October 18, 1979 (age 46) Evanston, Illinois, U.S.
- Party: Democratic
- Education: Northwestern University (BA); Harvard University (MBA, MPA)
- Website: Campaign website

Military service
- Branch/service: United States Marine Corps
- Rank: Captain
- Battles/wars: Iraq War
- Awards: Navy Commendation Medal; Navy and Marine Corps Achievement Medal

Maura C. Sullivan (born October 18, 1979) is an American politician and former government official. Sullivan previously served as an official in the Obama administration from 2014 to 2016 in both the United States Department of Veterans Affairs and the United States Department of Defense. She also served on the American Battle Monuments Commission starting in 2010, and began her career as an officer in the United States Marine Corps serving in the Iraq War after the September 11 attacks.

Sullivan ran for Congress as a Democrat in New Hampshire's 1st congressional district, which includes Manchester, Portsmouth, and Lake Winnipesaukee. On September 11, 2018, she lost her primary race for the 1st congressional district to Chris Pappas. In April 2025, after Pappas announced his run for Senate in 2026, Sullivan launched her campaign for the same House seat in the 2026 election. She was elected vice chair of the New Hampshire Democratic Party in 2023.

== Early life and education ==
Sullivan attended Northwestern University on an ROTC scholarship. Sullivan then served as a logistics officer in the U.S. Marine Corps, reaching the rank of captain, and her deployments included time in Okinawa, Japan, and Fallujah, Iraq. She earned the Navy Commendation Medal and a Navy / Marine Corps Achievement Medal with a Gold Star.

Following her military service, Sullivan attended Harvard Kennedy School and Harvard Business School. She graduated in 2009 and worked at PepsiCo in management roles across New England.

== Government career ==
In 2010, Sullivan was named to the American Battle Monuments Commission. On October 1, 2014, President Obama appointed Sullivan Assistant Secretary of Veterans Affairs for the Office of Public & Intergovernmental Affairs. At the VA, Sullivan was the principal public affairs advisor to Secretary Robert A. McDonald.

On June 22, 2015, Sullivan was named Assistant to the Secretary of Defense for Public Affairs, where she led communications policy for the Department of Defense.

== Political career ==
=== 2018 congressional election ===
On October 23, 2017, Sullivan announced that she would run for Congress in New Hampshire's 1st congressional district less than three months after moving to the state. After entering the race, Sullivan raised over $1.5 million and was endorsed by EMILY's List, Serve America, New Politics, WithHonor.org, and Vote Vets.

Throughout the campaign, Sullivan was criticized as a "carpetbagger" due to her lack of history in New Hampshire.

During her campaign, Sullivan was endorsed by Seth Moulton, a fellow Marine Corps veteran and U.S. Representative from Massachusetts. She was also endorsed by Kathleen Sebelius, the former Health and Human Services Secretary in the Obama administration and former Governor of Kansas.

Sullivan lost the Democratic primary on September 11, 2018, coming in second to Chris Pappas.

=== 2026 congressional election ===
On April 10, 2025, Sullivan announced she would again run for Congress in New Hampshire's 1st congressional district, following Pappas's decision to run for United States Senate. Sullivan raised $400,000 in her campaign's first week. She received the endorsements of Vote Vets, With Honor, and Congressman Seth Moulton.

Shortly after her campaign was launched, Sullivan was criticized for tweeting that she was a "lifelong Granite Stater," despite moving to New Hampshire in 2017. She subsequently deleted the tweet.

Sullivan has been endorsed by the pro-Israel lobby group Democratic Majority for Israel (DMFI) but has said that she is not seeking an endorsement from the pro-Israel lobby group AIPAC.
