= Michael Yakubovich =

American politician

Member of New Hampshire House of Representatives for Merrimack 24
- In office December 5, 2018 – December 7, 2022
- Preceded by: John Leavitt
- Succeeded by: Matthew Hicks

Personal details
- Born: 1971
- Died: May 2026 (aged 54–55)
- Party: Republican
- Website: www.michael4nh.com

Michael Yakubovich (1971 – May 2026) was an American politician. He was a member of the New Hampshire House of Representatives and represented Merrimack's 24th district.

Yakubovich moved to New Hampshire in 2015. He was a candidate for District 24 in the 2022 New Hampshire Senate election but withdrew after winning the primary against Barbara Griffin due to illness. In 2025, Governor Kelly Ayotte signed the "John Lewicke and Michael Yakubovich Right to Try Act" into law.

Yakubovich died in May 2026 of cholangiocarcinoma. Jason Osborne, Majority Leader for the New Hampshire House of Representatives, issued a statement calling Yakubovich "...a great man, a dedicated public servant, a champion of liberty and an absolute legend."
