= Tony Lekas =

American politician

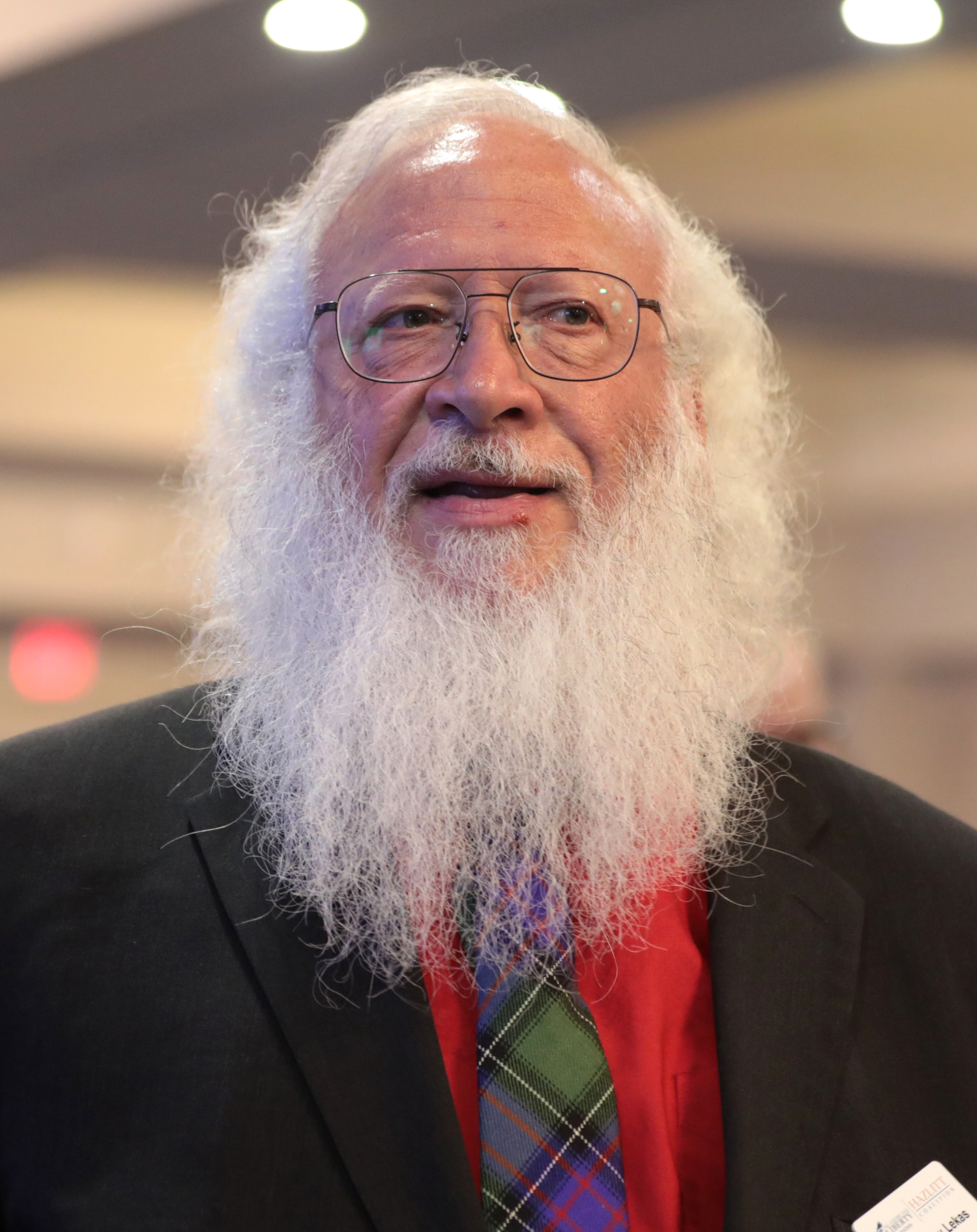
Tony Lekas in 2022.

Tony Lekas is an American Republican politician. He serves in the New Hampshire House of Representatives in Hillsborough County - District 38 alongside Alicia Lekas.
