= Mindi Messmer =

American politician

Member of the New Hampshire House of Representatives from the 24th Rockingham district
- In office December 7, 2016 – December 4, 2018 Serving with Kate Murray
- Preceded by: David Borden; Tom Sherman
- Succeeded by: Jaci Grote

Personal details
- Party: Democratic
- Children: 2
- Education: Syracuse University (BS); Georgetown University (MS)

Mindi Messmer is an American scientist, politician and author She served as a member of the New Hampshire House of Representatives from 2016 to 2018, representing Rockingham district 24 (Rye and New Castle). She was a candidate for the 2018 Democratic nomination for New Hampshire's 1st congressional district seat and the Democratic candidate in the 2020 general election for the Executive Council in New Hampshire's District 3.

== Education ==
After high school, Messmer studied computer science at Syracuse University before switching her major to geology. She earned a Master of Science in clinical and translational science from Georgetown University.

== Career ==
Messmer works as a senior research scientist. As a legislator, she spearheaded stronger protections for bottled water, and for arsenic, lead, and PFAS chemicals in drinking water and lead poisoning prevention. She has conducted and managed projects ranging in scale from small hazardous waste site assessments and remediation design, to large remedial investigations and remedial action under a variety of regulatory programs including RCRA, CERCLA, and State Superfund.

Messmer has served on then-Governor Maggie Hassan's Task Force to investigate the rhabdomyosarcoma and pleuropulmonary blastoma double pediatric cancer cluster that she identified and reported in 2014. The cluster was confirmed by the NH Department of Health and Human Services (DHHS) in 2016. She was appointed head of the Governor's Task Force Subcommittee to coordinate efforts with the USEPA and New Hampshire Department of Environmental Services (NHDES) to direct the investigation into Coakley Landfill Superfund Site. She continues to serve on several statutory commissions aimed at cancer prevention, and environmental and drinking water protection and serves as chair of the Environmentally-Triggered Chronic Disease Statutory Commission formed by the bill she sponsored in 2017 (HB511).

Messmer continues to raise awareness and publish science relative to environmentally-triggered disease and cancer and cancer prevention.

== Politics ==
=== New Hampshire House ===
Messmer's three bills signed into law in 2017 include House Bill 484 which established a commission on the Seacoast cancer cluster investigation, House Bill 431 which established a commission to study long-term goals and requirements for drinking water in the Seacoast area, and House Bill 511 which established a commission to study environmentally-triggered chronic illness. House Bill 485, which addressed the need for standards for emerging contaminants in drinking water was opposed by the Business and Industry Association. House Republican members from Merrimack and Hudson, New Hampshire, where the Saint Gobain corporation contaminated drinking water in three towns including Merrimack, Litchfield and Bedford, walked away from the Committee of Conference and refused to return.

In January 2017, Messmer and Rep. Renny Cushing, founders of Greenland Safe Water Action and Testing for Pease, founded New Hampshire Safe Water Alliance.

For the 2018 session, Messmer has authored an "Anti-Hate" Resolution in response to hate crimes in the state and legislation authorizing for state regulators to take action to address an imminent hazard associated with surface water contaminated by an aged Superfund Site.

=== 2018 U.S. House campaign ===
On November 15, 2017, Messmer announced her candidacy for the 2018 Democratic nomination for New Hampshire's 1st congressional district, following incumbent representative Carol Shea-Porter's decision not to seek re-election. She came third in the primary to New Hampshire councilor Chris Pappas, who went on to win the seat at the 2018 election.

== Electoral history ==
Democratic candidate in the 2020 general election for the District 3 Executive Council seat.

Messmer's bid for the 1st congressional district in 2018 placed third in a field of eleven candidates.

Elected to the New Hampshire House of Representatives for District 24 for Rye and New Castle in the fall of 2016.

2016 New Hampshire's 24th House district election
Party	Candidate	Votes	%
Democratic	Mindi Messmer	2,249	26.6
Democratic	Kate Murray	2,181	25.8
Republican	Janet Stevens	2,093	24.8
Republican	Frances Erlebacher	1,920	22.7
