= Mark MacKenzie =

American politician

Mark MacKenzie is an American politician and labor leader from the state of New Hampshire. MacKenzie, a member of the Democratic Party, serves in the New Hampshire House of Representatives.

MacKenzie joined the Manchester, New Hampshire fire department at age 21 and served for 25 years. He became the president of the New Hampshire chapter of the AFL–CIO in 1989 and served through 2015. He ran for the United States House of Representatives in New Hampshire's 1st congressional district in the 2018 elections, but lost in the Democratic primary, coming in 8th out of 11 candidates.
