= Carol Shea-Porter =

American politician (born 1952)

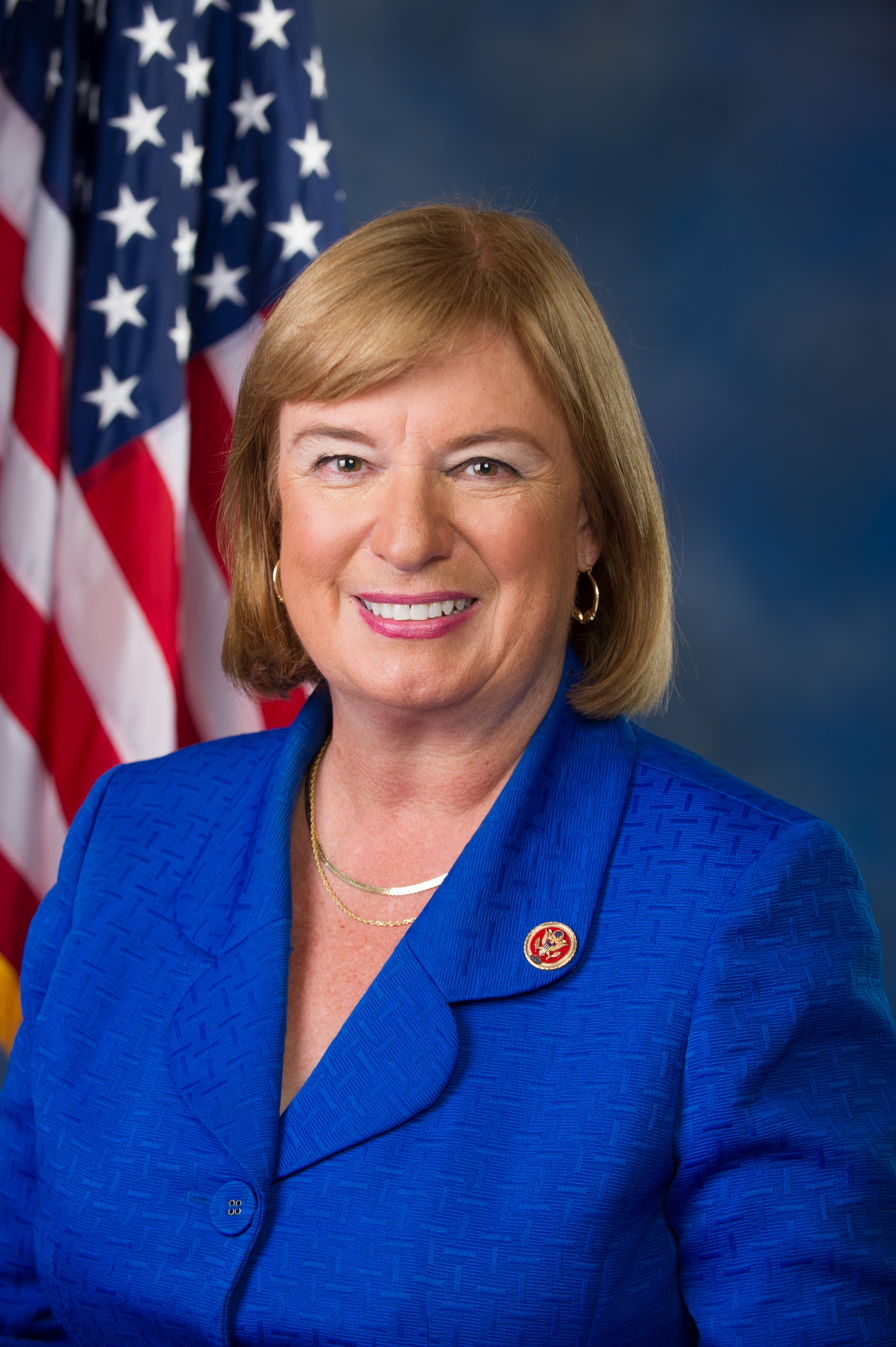
- Official portrait, 2013

Member of the U.S. House of Representatives from New Hampshire's 1st district
- In office January 3, 2017 – January 3, 2019
- Preceded by: Frank Guinta
- Succeeded by: Chris Pappas
- In office January 3, 2013 – January 3, 2015
- Preceded by: Frank Guinta
- Succeeded by: Frank Guinta
- In office January 3, 2007 – January 3, 2011
- Preceded by: Jeb Bradley
- Succeeded by: Frank Guinta

Personal details
- Born: Carol Shea; December 2, 1952 (age 73) New York City, New York, U.S.
- Party: Democratic
- Spouse: Gene Porter
- Children: 2
- Education: University of New Hampshire (BA, MPA)
- Website: House website

Carol Shea-Porter (born December 2, 1952) is an American politician and member of the Democratic Party who is the former member of the United States House of Representatives for New Hampshire's 1st congressional district. She held the seat from 2007 to 2011, 2013 to 2015, and 2017 to 2019.

Shea-Porter was first elected in 2006, defeating Republican incumbent Jeb Bradley. She beat Bradley again in 2008 but was defeated in 2010 by former Manchester Mayor Frank Guinta and left Congress in January 2011. In 2012, Shea-Porter reclaimed her seat as she beat Guinta in a rematch. She faced Guinta for a third time in the 2014 election and lost for the second time. On July 2, 2015, she announced she would again run for her old seat. She defeated Guinta for the second time, facing him for the fourth election in a row.

On October 6, 2017, Shea-Porter announced that she would not run for re-election in 2018. Fellow Democrat Chris Pappas was elected on November 6 to succeed Shea-Porter in the 116th United States Congress.

== Early life, education and career ==
=== Early life and education ===
Shea-Porter was born in New York City and grew up in the Seacoast Region of New Hampshire, attending local public schools, and graduating from the University of New Hampshire. She earned a bachelor's degree in social services and a master's degree in public administration. Prior to becoming involved in politics, she and her family lived in Colorado, Louisiana, and Maryland, during which time she was a social worker and community college instructor.

=== Career ===
After returning to New Hampshire, she worked for the Wesley Clark presidential campaign and was a volunteer for John Kerry’s presidential run. She is married to Gene Porter, a former U.S. Army officer, with whom she has two grown children.

== U.S House of Representatives ==
=== Elections ===
==== 2006 ====
In 2006, Shea-Porter was a liberal community activist who had never held public office. Shea-Porter, who had won some fame for being escorted from a George W. Bush rally wearing a T-shirt that read "Turn Your Back On Bush," ran on a strong anti-Iraq War message. In addition to opposition to the Iraq war, Shea-Porter campaigned on a platform of increasing the minimum wage and universal healthcare. In the five-way Democratic primary, the Democratic Congressional Campaign Committee put its weight behind state legislator Jim Craig. Shea-Porter won the September 12, 2006, primary with 54% of the vote. Craig finished second with 34% of the vote.

On November 7, 2006, Shea-Porter narrowly defeated incumbent Republican Jeb Bradley in the 2006 midterm elections to become the first woman elected to Congress from New Hampshire. Shea-Porter received 100,899 votes (51%) to Bradley's 94,869 votes (49%). She received no financial support from either the Democratic National Committee or the Democratic Congressional Campaign Committee and was outspent by her opponent three to one.

==== 2008 ====
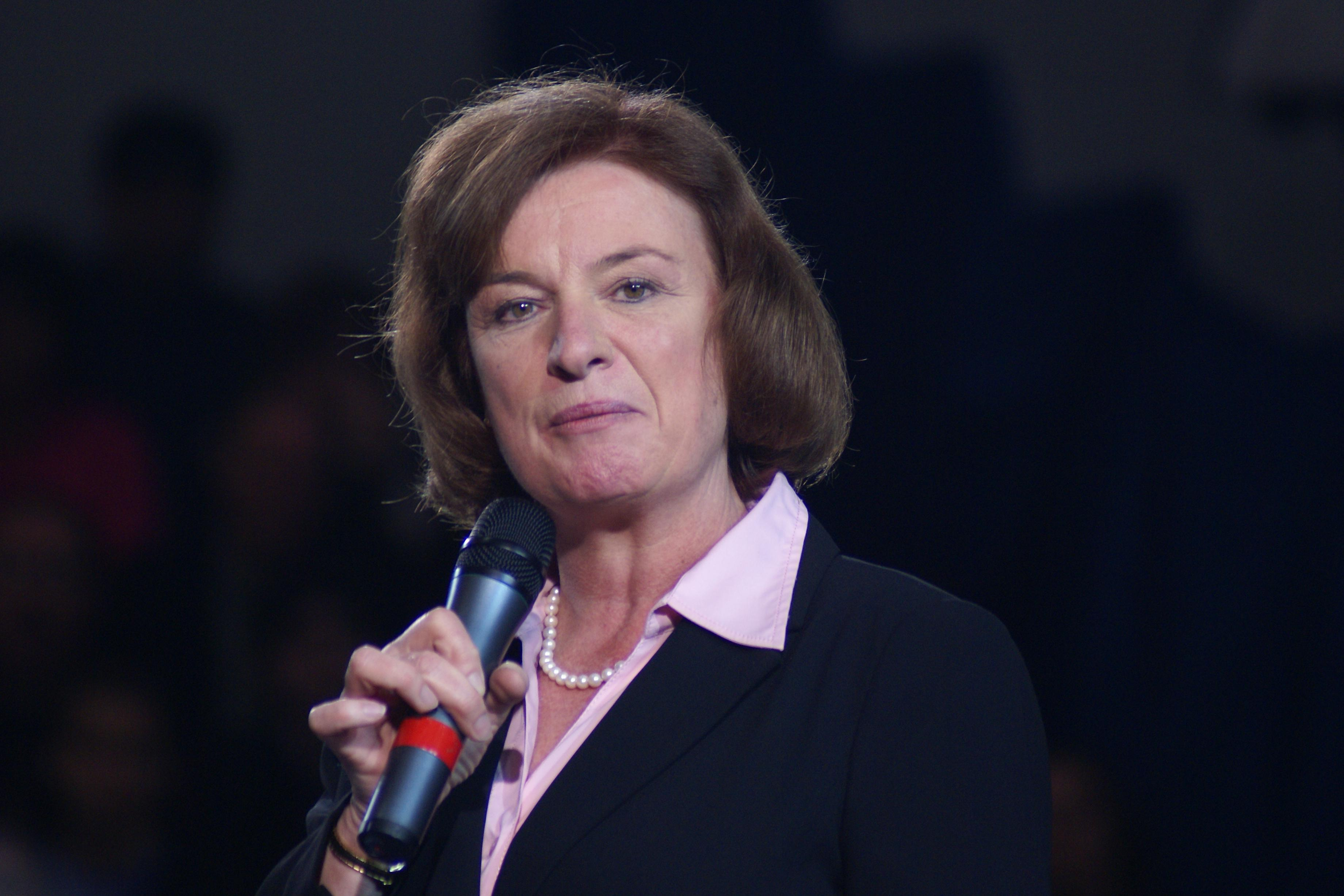
Shea-Porter at Winnacunnet High School in Hampton, New Hampshire, 2007

Shea-Porter was re-elected to a second term in November 2008, defeating Bradley for the second time, winning by 52% to 46% margin. The Concord Monitor in 2008 changed its endorsement, which had gone to Bradley in 2006, to support Shea-Porter, citing her positions in favor of increased minimum wage, ending the Bush tax cuts, and veterans issues.

During her 2008 re-election campaign, she reversed course and requested financial support from the Democratic Congressional Campaign Committee. The Committee enrolled Congresswoman Shea-Porter in their "Frontline" program "which helps vulnerable incumbents with fundraising and campaign infrastructure."

==== 2010 ====
Shea-Porter was defeated by her Republican opponent, former Manchester Mayor Frank Guinta, who won by a 54% to 42% margin, larger than Shea-Porter has won to date.

==== 2012 ====
Shea-Porter launched a 2012 campaign for her old House seat in New Hampshire's 1st District. She received the endorsement of Democracy for America, and was selected as one of their Dean Dozen. In the general election she narrowly won the seat back from Frank Guinta, who had won in the 2010 election.

==== 2014 ====
Shea-Porter ran for re-election. She was once again a member of the Democratic Congressional Campaign Committee's Frontline Program, which is designed to help protect vulnerable Democratic incumbents heading into the 2014 election. Shea-Porter made Roll Call's "Ten Most Vulnerable" list for the third quarter. According to Roll Call, New Hampshire is a swing state and could be susceptible to national political trends. The Rothenberg Political Report considered the election a “Toss-up.” Mayday PAC, a super PAC seeking to reduce the role of money in politics, announced its endorsement of Shea-Porter because of her support of campaign finance reform. She was also being supported in her election campaign by EMILY's List, a political action committee that seeks to elect pro-choice Democratic women. Shea-Porter lost to Guinta again by a margin of 52% to 48%.

==== 2016 ====
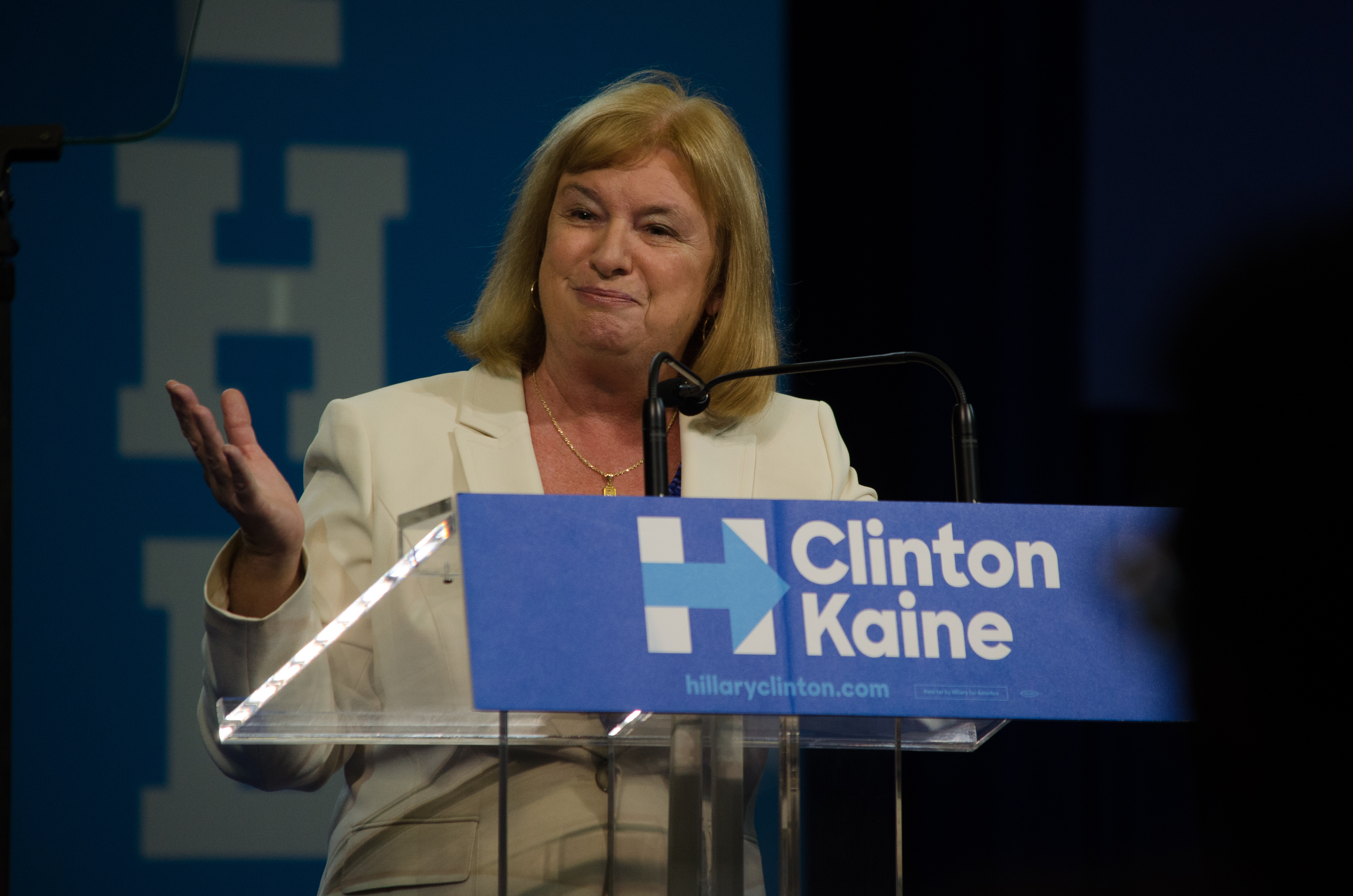
Shea-Porter speaks at a Hillary Clinton presidential rally at Southern New Hampshire University.

Shea-Porter ran again for U.S. Congress in 2016 and was elected on November 8. She ran unopposed in the Democratic primary. She faced incumbent Republican Frank Guinta and independent candidate Shawn O'Connor in the general election, defeating them both with 44.2% of the vote to return to Congress. Shea-Porter has lost to Guinta twice and beat him twice. In January 2017, Shea-Porter announced she would not attend the inauguration of Donald Trump according to WMUR-TV and multiple other sources.

=== Tenure ===
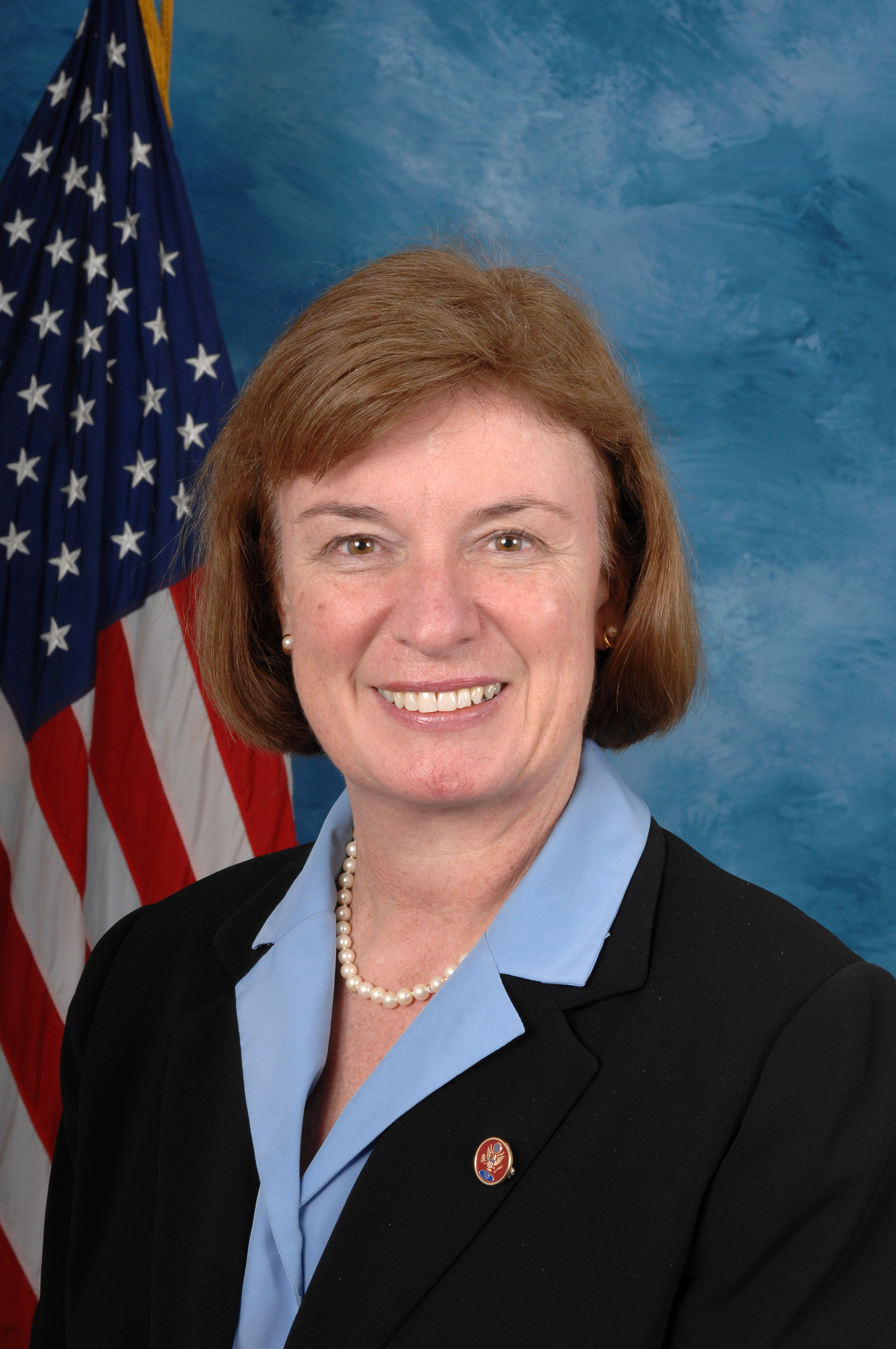
Shea-Porter during the 110th Congress

In 2010, Shea-Porter was a lead co-sponsor of a bill aimed to help protect troops in Iraq and Afghanistan from the disposal of toxic waste in open air burn pits. Also in 2010, she co-sponsored legislation to establish a national commission to study urological war injuries. After the 2012 Benghazi attack, Shea-Porter said the U.S. should continue a relationship to achieve democracy in Libya.

Shea-Porter supports decreasing U.S. reliance on foreign energy sources and agrees with a number of the objectives of financier and oil magnate T. Boone Pickens on these matters including continuance of emissions trading measures, a system already in effect for her constituency in the form of the Regional Greenhouse Gas Initiative. Shea-Porter opposes the Keystone XL pipeline and believes that the United States needs a policy that moves away from oil as a primary energy source. She voted for the American Clean Energy and Security Act, which proposed a cap and trade system under which the government would allocate carbon permits and credits to companies. She has advocated for the creation of a federal institute dedicated to reducing dependence on foreign oil.

Shea-Porter voted for the Patient Protection and Affordable Care Act (often better known as Obamacare), saying "We’ll continue to work on that, but this is a good bill.” She led an effort to pass the Affordable Care Act and stated her support for closing the "donut hole" in Medicare reimbursements for senior citizens.

In June 2013, Shea-Porter voted against the Pain-Capable Unborn Child Protection Act, which would ban abortions that take place 20 or more weeks after fertilization.

Shea-Porter voted against the No Budget, No Pay Act of 2013, which would have “docked pay for members of Congress if they didn’t make progress on passing a budget.” She also opposed a vote to freeze federal employee pay.

In August 2014 Shea-Porter voted against an immigration bill that would increase funding for border protection and more administrative support.

Shea-Porter voted for the auto industry bailout and the "Cash for Clunkers" bill.

Shea-Porter was named a vice-chair of the 2020 Democratic National Convention.

==== Town hall disruptions ====
Following the passage of the Patient Protection and Affordable Care Act, many members of Congress held town hall meetings throughout their districts in an effort to explain and, in some cases, defend their votes. Shea-Porter, like several of her colleagues, found herself on the defensive at two such events held in Portsmouth and Bedford. She took about a dozen questions at each, the majority of which "were in opposition to Shea-Porter's health care vote."

=== Committee assignments ===
Previous

- Committee on Education and Labor (2007–2011; 2017–2019)
- Committee on Armed Services (2007–2011; 2013–2015; 2017–2019)
  - Subcommittee on Military Personnel
  - Subcommittee on Readiness
- Committee on Natural Resources (2007–2011; 2013–2015)
  - Subcommittee on Fisheries, Wildlife, Oceans and Insular Affairs
  - Subcommittee on Public Lands and Environmental Regulation

She was a member of the Congressional Progressive Caucus, the Congressional Arts Caucus, and the United States Congressional International Conservation Caucus.

== Electoral history ==
Year	Office	Election	Subject	Party	Votes	%	Opponent	Party	Votes	%	Opponent	Party	Votes	%	Opponent	Party	Votes	%
2006	Congress, District 1	General	Carol Shea-Porter	Democratic	100,837	51.31	Jeb Bradley	Republican	95,538	48.61								
2008	Congress, District 1	General	Carol Shea-Porter	Democratic	176,461	51.78	Jeb Bradley	Republican	156,394	45.89	Robert Kingsbury	Libertarian	8,100	2.4				
2010	Congress, District 1	General	Carol Shea-Porter	Democratic	95,503	42.36	Frank Guinta	Republican	121,655	53.96	Philip Hodson	Libertarian	7,966	3.5				
2012	Congress, District 1	General	Carol Shea-Porter	Democratic	171,356	49.7	Frank Guinta	Republican	158,482	46.0	Brendan Kelly	Libertarian	14,521	4.2				
2014	Congress, District 1	General	Carol Shea-Porter	Democratic	116,626	48.2	Frank Guinta	Republican	125,321	51.8								
2016	Congress, District 1	General	Carol Shea-Porter	Democratic	162,080	44.3	Frank Guinta	Republican	157,176	43.0	Shawn O'Connor	Independent	34,735	9.5	Others		11,581	3.17

== Personal life ==
Porter is Roman Catholic.

== See also ==
- Women in the United States House of Representatives

U.S. House of Representatives
Preceded by Jeb Bradley	Member of the U.S. House of Representatives from New Hampshire's 1st congressional district 2007–2011	Succeeded by Frank Guinta
Preceded by Frank Guinta	Member of the U.S. House of Representatives from New Hampshire's 1st congressional district 2013–2015	Succeeded by Frank Guinta
Preceded by Frank Guinta	Member of the U.S. House of Representatives from New Hampshire's 1st congressional district 2017–2019	Succeeded by Chris Pappas
U.S. order of precedence (ceremonial)
Preceded by Trey Gowdy as Former U.S. Representative	Order of precedence of the United States as Former U.S. Representative	Succeeded by Lewis F. Payne Jr. as Former U.S. Representative
