= Chris Pappas (American politician) =

American politician (born 1980)

- Official portrait, 2022

United States Senator-elect from New Hampshire
- Assuming office January 3, 2027
- Succeeding: Jeanne Shaheen

Member of the U.S. House of Representatives from New Hampshire's 1st district
- Incumbent
- Assumed office January 3, 2019
- Preceded by: Carol Shea-Porter

Member of the New Hampshire Executive Council from the 4th district
- In office January 3, 2013 – January 3, 2019
- Preceded by: Raymond Wieczorek
- Succeeded by: Ted Gatsas

Treasurer of Hillsborough County
- In office January 4, 2007 – January 6, 2011
- Preceded by: David Fredette
- Succeeded by: Bob Burns

Member of the New Hampshire House of Representatives from Hillsborough County
- In office December 4, 2002 – December 6, 2006
- Preceded by: Multi-member constituency
- Succeeded by: Multi-member constituency
- Constituency: Hillsborough 49 (2002–2004); Hillsborough 8 (2004–2006)

Personal details
- Born: Christopher Charles Pappas; June 4, 1980 (age 46) Manchester, New Hampshire, U.S.
- Party: Democratic
- Spouse: Vann Bentley (m. 2023)
- Education: Harvard University (BA)
- Website: House website; Campaign website
- Pappas's voice Pappas supporting the Respect for Marriage Act. Recorded December 8, 2022

Christopher Charles Pappas (/ˈpæpəs/ PAPP-əss; born June 4, 1980) is an American politician who is a United States senator-elect from New Hampshire. A member of the Democratic Party, Pappas has served as the U.S. representative from New Hampshire's 1st congressional district since 2019. He also served on the New Hampshire Executive Council from 2013 to 2019.

Pappas is the first openly gay man to represent New Hampshire in Congress. His district covers much of the southern and eastern parts of New Hampshire and includes the state's largest city, Manchester, as well as the Seacoast and the Lakes Region. He is the Senator-elect to the U.S. Senate in the 2026 election, after facing Republican nominee John E. Sununu. Pappas is also the first openly gay man to win a U.S. Senate seat.

== Early life and education ==
Pappas was born in Manchester, New Hampshire, the son of Dawn and Arthur Pappas. His paternal great-grandfather, also named Arthur Pappas, arrived in New Hampshire as a new American citizen in the early 20th century, having recently emigrated from the village of Livadi in Greece. In 1917, Arthur Pappas and his cousin Louis Canotas founded an ice cream shop in Manchester. By 1919, they had expanded the business into a restaurant, now known as the Puritan Backroom, and in 1949, they added a function room. In 1974, Charlie Pappas, grandfather of Chris Pappas and co-owner of the Puritan at the time, claimed to have invented the chicken tender. The business remains family-owned, and as of 2020, Chris Pappas was one of its owners.

Pappas graduated from Manchester Central High School in 1998. He then attended Harvard College, earning his Bachelor of Arts in government in 2002. While at Harvard, he wrote for The Harvard Crimson.

== Early political career ==
In 1996, as a high school student, Pappas met Jeanne Shaheen, then a state senator and the Democratic nominee for governor. He signed on as a volunteer for Shaheen's campaign, marking his first foray into politics.

Pappas returned to Manchester after graduating from college and was elected to the New Hampshire House of Representatives in 2002. He served two terms before being elected treasurer of Hillsborough County. In 2010, he lost his bid for a third term as county treasurer to Bob Burns.

In 2012, Pappas was elected to the New Hampshire Executive Council from the 4th district, defeating Burns. He was reelected in 2014 and 2016.

== U.S. House of Representatives ==
=== Elections ===
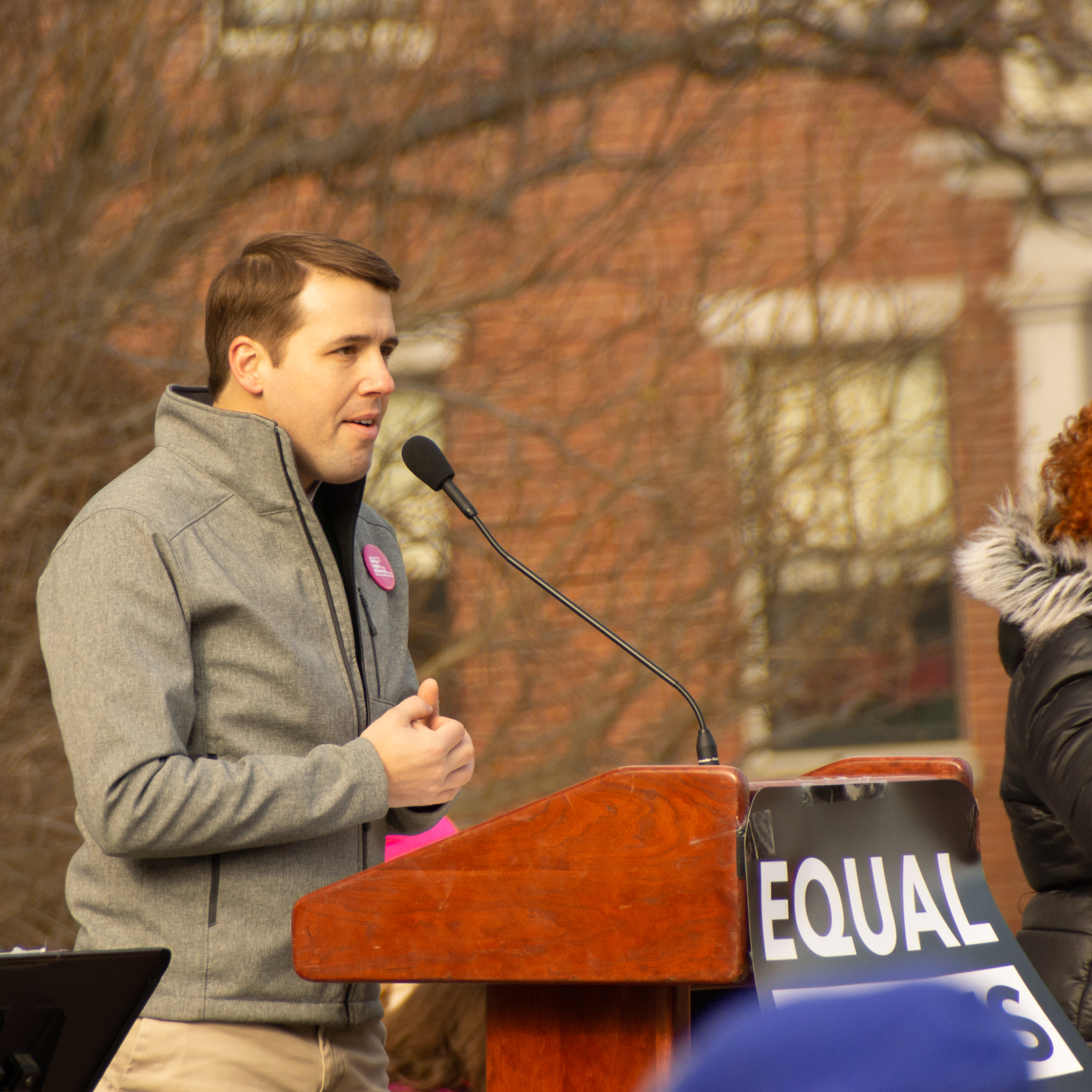
Pappas speaking at a Women's March event in 2019

==== 2018 ====
For years, Pappas was thought of as a potential candidate for the U.S. House of Representatives, the United States Senate, and governor of New Hampshire. After U.S. representative Carol Shea-Porter announced that she would not seek reelection in 2018, Pappas announced his candidacy for her seat in New Hampshire's 1st congressional district. Pappas defeated ten other candidates for the Democratic nomination, including former assistant to the secretary of defense for public affairs Maura Sullivan and Bernie Sanders's son Levi Sanders, with 42.2% of the vote.

Pappas defeated Republican Eddie Edwards, a former police chief and member of the New Hampshire State Division of Liquor Enforcement, in the general election, with 53.6% of the vote. He won every county except Belknap County.

==== 2020 ====
Pappas ran for reelection to a second term and was unopposed in the Democratic primary. He defeated Republican Matt Mowers, a former New Hampshire Republican Party executive director and former U.S. State Department staffer, in the general election, receiving 51.32% of the vote.

==== 2022 ====
Pappas was reelected in 2022. He ran unopposed in the Democratic primary and defeated future Trump administration official Karoline Leavitt with 54% of the vote.

==== 2024 ====
Pappas ran for a fourth term in 2024. He defeated Kevin Rondeau for the Democratic nomination, winning 95.2% of the vote. He faced Republican Russell Prescott, a former state senator with whom Pappas served on the New Hampshire Executive Council, in the general election. He was reelected by 32,641 votes.

=== Committee assignments ===
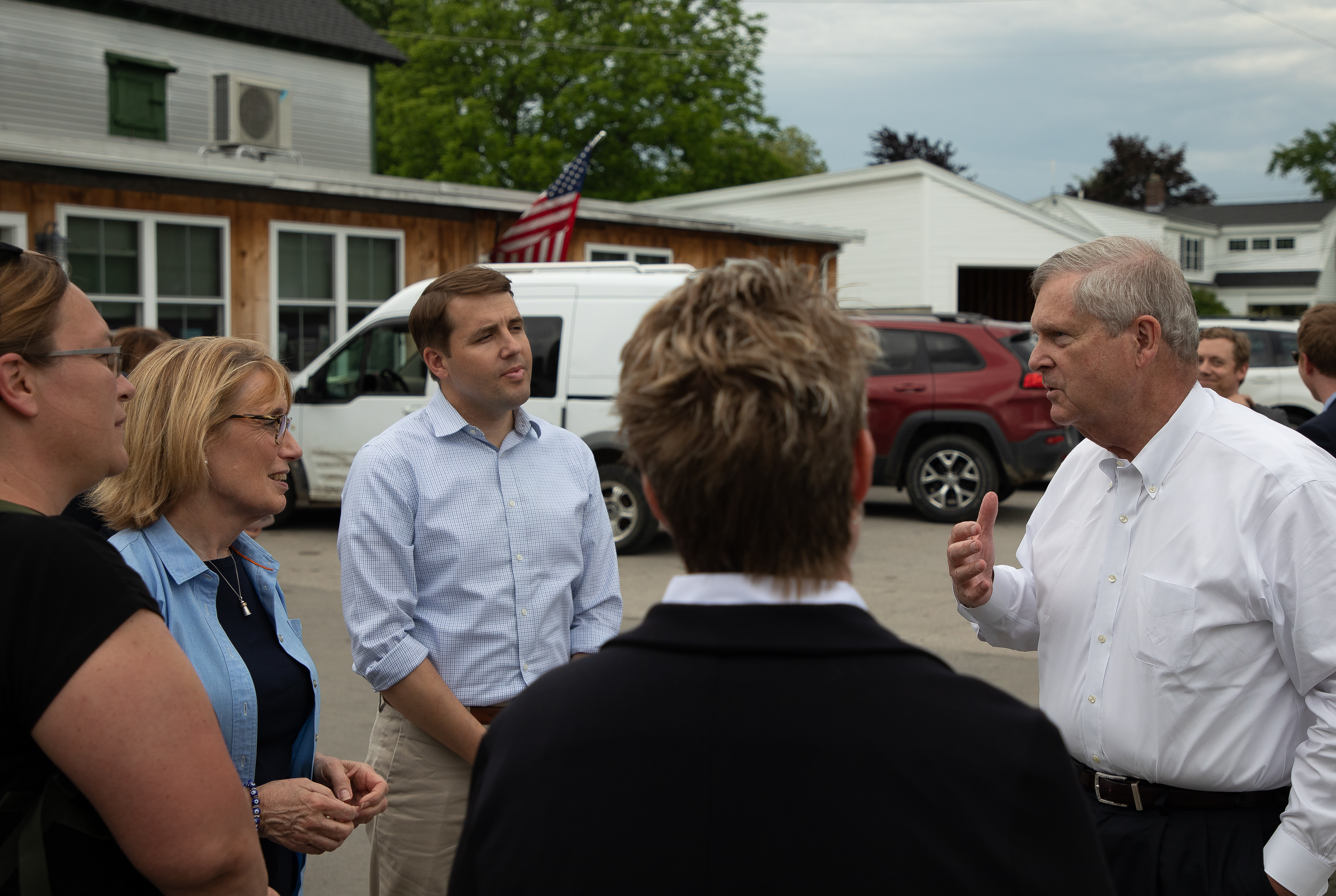
Pappas meeting with Secretary of Agriculture Tom Vilsack

Committee Assignments for the 119th Congress:

- Committee on Transportation and Infrastructure
  - Subcommittee on Coast Guard and Maritime Transportation
  - Subcommittee on Highways and Transit
  - Subcommittee on Water Resources and Environment
- Committee on Veterans' Affairs
  - Subcommittee on Economic Opportunity
  - Subcommittee on Disability Assistance and Memorial Affairs

=== Caucus memberships ===
- Congressional Equality Caucus (co-chair)
- Future Forum
- New Democrat Coalition
- Problem Solvers Caucus
- Tom Lantos Human Rights Commission
- House Pro-Choice Caucus
- Rare Disease Caucus

== 2026 Senate election ==
In March 2025, after incumbent Democratic U.S. senator Jeanne Shaheen announced that she would not run for reelection in 2026, it was reported that Pappas was "definitely considering" running for the seat.

On April 3, 2025, Pappas announced his candidacy for the seat. He faced scientist Karishma Manzur in the Democratic primary. Pappas entered the primary as the frontrunner and was endorsed by Shaheen.

On September 8, 2026, Pappas won the primary, becoming the Democratic nominee.

In November 2026 Pappas was elected as a senator of New Hampshire, making him the first openly gay male senator elect in the history of the United States.

== Political positions ==
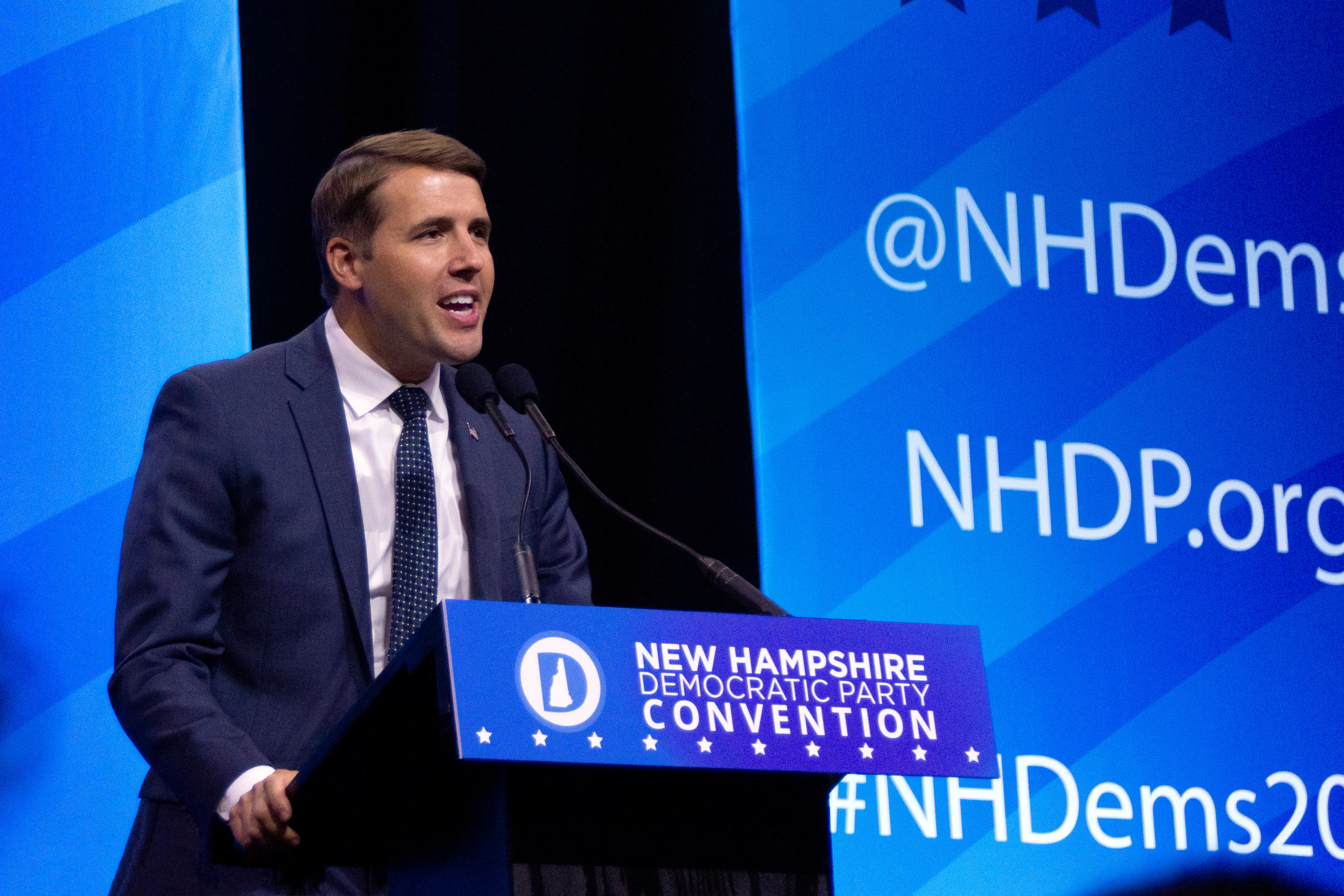
Pappas speaking at the New Hampshire Democratic Party 2019 Convention

In 2020, Pappas voiced support for the Supreme Court's ruling in Bostock v. Clayton County, which held that LGBTQ workers are protected under Title VII of the Civil Rights Act of 1964. He also co-sponsored the Equality Act, which would amend the Civil Rights Act of 1964 to explicitly prohibit discrimination on the basis of sexual orientation and gender identity in education, employment, housing, credit, federal jury service, public accommodations, and the use of federal funds.

Pappas was one of six House Democrats to vote against the Marijuana Opportunity Reinvestment and Expungement (MORE) Act to legalize cannabis at the federal level in 2020. Pappas said he supports removing cannabis from the Controlled Substances Act but he had concerns about other provisions of the bill and felt that it was being rushed through.

After the Supreme Court overturned Roe v. Wade in June 2022, Pappas expressed support for passing a law in Congress to restore abortion rights nationally.

In August 2022, Pappas criticized President Biden's plan to cancel $10,000 in federal student debt for those making less than $125,000 and up to $20,000 for Pell Grant recipients, calling it "no way to make policy" and saying it did little to address the root cause of the rising costs of higher education.

In 2023, the Lugar Center's Bipartisan Index ranked Pappas the most bipartisan House Democrat.

In 2025, Pappas was one of 46 House Democrats who voted for the Laken Riley Act, saying it would give federal law enforcement the necessary tools to enforce the law.

=== Foreign policy ===
In March 2023, Pappas voted against H. Con. Res. 21, which directed President Joe Biden to remove U.S. troops from Syria within 180 days. He did, however, call for a critical review of the U.S. military's role in the region after 20 years of engagement and urged the Biden administration to consult with Congress, develop a clear strategy, and base decisions on ground intelligence and coordination with military leaders.

In the aftermath of the October 7 attacks, Pappas expressed support for both Israel's right to defend itself and Palestinian self-determination. On November 7, 2023, Pappas voted, along with 212 Republicans and 22 Democrats, in favor of H.Res 845 to censure Representative Rashida Tlaib. The censure resolution condemned Tlaib for "promoting false narratives regarding the October 7, 2023, Hamas attack on Israel and for calling for the destruction of the state of Israel." The resolution said that the phrase "from the river to the sea" is "a genocidal call to violence to destroy the state of Israel and its people to replace it with a Palestinian state extending from the Jordan River to the Mediterranean Sea". Pappas has voiced support for a two-state solution and sending humanitarian aid to Gaza and has criticized the Israel Defense Forces' targeting of civilians in Gaza.

As of 2026, Pappas has received at least $200,000 from pro-Israel donors in campaign contributions.

Pappas has supported war powers resolutions to limit the 2026 Iran war. He said, "I've supported war powers resolutions to help constrain the ability of Donald Trump to use our military in this fashion without consulting Congress and the American people." In an April 2026 WMUR-TV interview, Pappas said the Iran war is a "war of choice". He said the Iran war changed his view of arms sales to Israel, and he would now vote to limit certain arms sales to Israel.

== Personal life ==
Pappas is openly gay. He married Vann Bentley in February 2023. They live in Manchester, New Hampshire. Pappas is an Orthodox Christian and is affiliated with the Greek Orthodox Archdiocese of America.

Pappas co-owns the Puritan Backroom restaurant in Manchester. The Puritan Backroom is well known in New Hampshire as a frequent stop for presidential candidates during the New Hampshire primary.

== Electoral history ==
2018 New Hampshire's 1st congressional district election
Primary election
| Party | Candidate | Votes | % |
|---|---|---|---|
| Democratic | Chris Pappas | 27,350 | 42.4 |
| Democratic | Maura Sullivan | 19,560 | 30.3 |
| Democratic | Mindi Messmer | 6,143 | 9.5 |
| Democratic | Naomi Andrews | 4,546 | 7.0 |
| Democratic | Lincoln Soldati | 2,003 | 3.1 |
| Democratic | Deaglan McEachern | 1,686 | 2.6 |
| Democratic | Levi Sanders | 1,160 | 1.8 |
| Democratic | Mark MacKenzie | 765 | 1.2 |
| Democratic | Terence O'Rourke | 667 | 1.0 |
| Democratic | Paul Cardinal | 328 | 0.5 |
| Democratic | William Martin | 235 | 0.4 |
| Write-in | | 130 | 0.2 |
| Total votes | | 64,573 | 100.0 |
General election
| Democratic | Chris Pappas | 155,884 | 53.6 |
| Republican | Eddie Edwards | 130,996 | 45.0 |
| Libertarian | Dan Belforti | 4,048 | 1.4 |
| Write-in | | 111 | 0.0 |
| Total votes | | 291,039 | 100.0 |
| Democratic hold | | | |

2020 New Hampshire's 1st congressional district election
Primary election
| Party | Candidate | Votes | % |
|---|---|---|---|
| Democratic | Chris Pappas (incumbent) | 70,643 | 99.4 |
| Write-in | | 391 | 0.6 |
| Total votes | | 71,034 | 100.0 |
General election
| Democratic | Chris Pappas (incumbent) | 205,606 | 51.3 |
| Republican | Matt Mowers | 185,159 | 46.2 |
| Libertarian | Zachary Dumont | 9,747 | 2.4 |
| Write-in | | 149 | 0.0 |
| Total votes | | 400,661 | 100.0 |
| Democratic hold | | | |

2022 New Hampshire's 1st congressional district election
Primary election
| Party | Candidate | Votes | % |
|---|---|---|---|
| Democratic | Chris Pappas (incumbent) | 41,990 | 99.1 |
| Write-in | | 378 | 0.9 |
| Total votes | | 42,368 | 100.0 |
General election
| Democratic | Chris Pappas (incumbent) | 167,391 | 54.0 |
| Republican | Karoline Leavitt | 142,229 | 45.9 |
| Write-in | | 342 | 0.1 |
| Total votes | | 309,962 | 100.0 |
| Democratic hold | | | |

2024 New Hampshire's 1st congressional district election
| Party | Candidate | Votes | % |
|---|---|---|---|
| Democratic | Chris Pappas (incumbent) | 54,927 | 94.8 |
| Democratic | Kevin Rondeau | 2,783 | 4.8 |
| Write-in | | 209 | 0.4 |
| Total votes | | 57,919 | 100.0 |
General election
| Democratic | Chris Pappas (incumbent) | 218,577 | 54.0 |
| Republican | Russell Prescott | 185,936 | 45.9 |
| Write-in | | 295 | 0.1 |
| Total votes | | 404,808 | 100.0 |
| Democratic hold | | | |

2026 New Hampshire US Senate Race
Primary election
| Party | Candidate | Votes | % |
|---|---|---|---|
| Democratic | Chris Pappas | 100,053 | 65.0 |
| Democratic | Karishma Manzur | 50,307 | 32.7 |
| Democratic | David Jarvis | 1,211 | 0.8 |
| Democratic | John Vail | 963 | 0.6 |
| Democratic | Maxwell Saal | 946 | 0.6 |
| Write-in | | 269 | 0.2 |
| Total votes | | 153,749 | 100.0 |

U.S. House of Representatives
| Preceded by Carol Shea-Porter | Member of the U.S. House of Representatives from New Hampshire's 1st congressional district 2019–present | Incumbent |
Party political offices
| Preceded by Jeanne Shaheen | Democratic nominee for U.S. Senator from New Hampshire (Class 2); 2026 | Most recent |
U.S. Senate
| Preceded by Jeanne Shaheen | U.S. Senator (Class 2) from New Hampshire; Taking office 2027; Served alongside: Maggie Hassan | Elect |
U.S. order of precedence (ceremonial)
| Preceded by Ilhan Omar | United States representatives by seniority 219th | Succeeded by Ayanna Pressley |
