= 2024 New Hampshire Democratic presidential primary =

2024 New Hampshire Democratic contests
- 2024 New Hampshire Democratic presidential primary (state-run)
- January 23, 2024

No delegates to the Democratic National Convention (Note: New Hampshire's delegates were not awarded through the state-run primary, as the early date violated the DNC-approved calendar.)

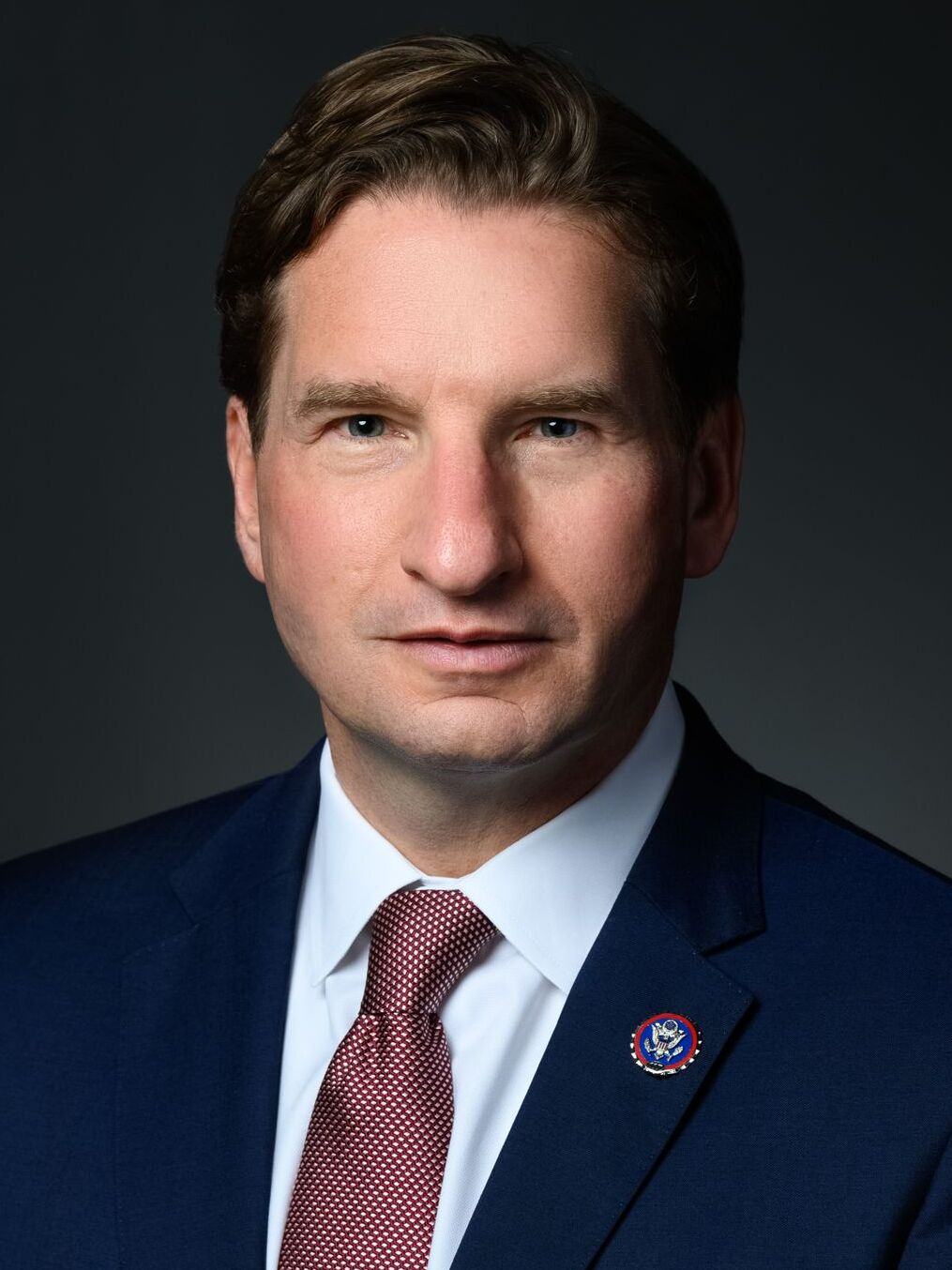

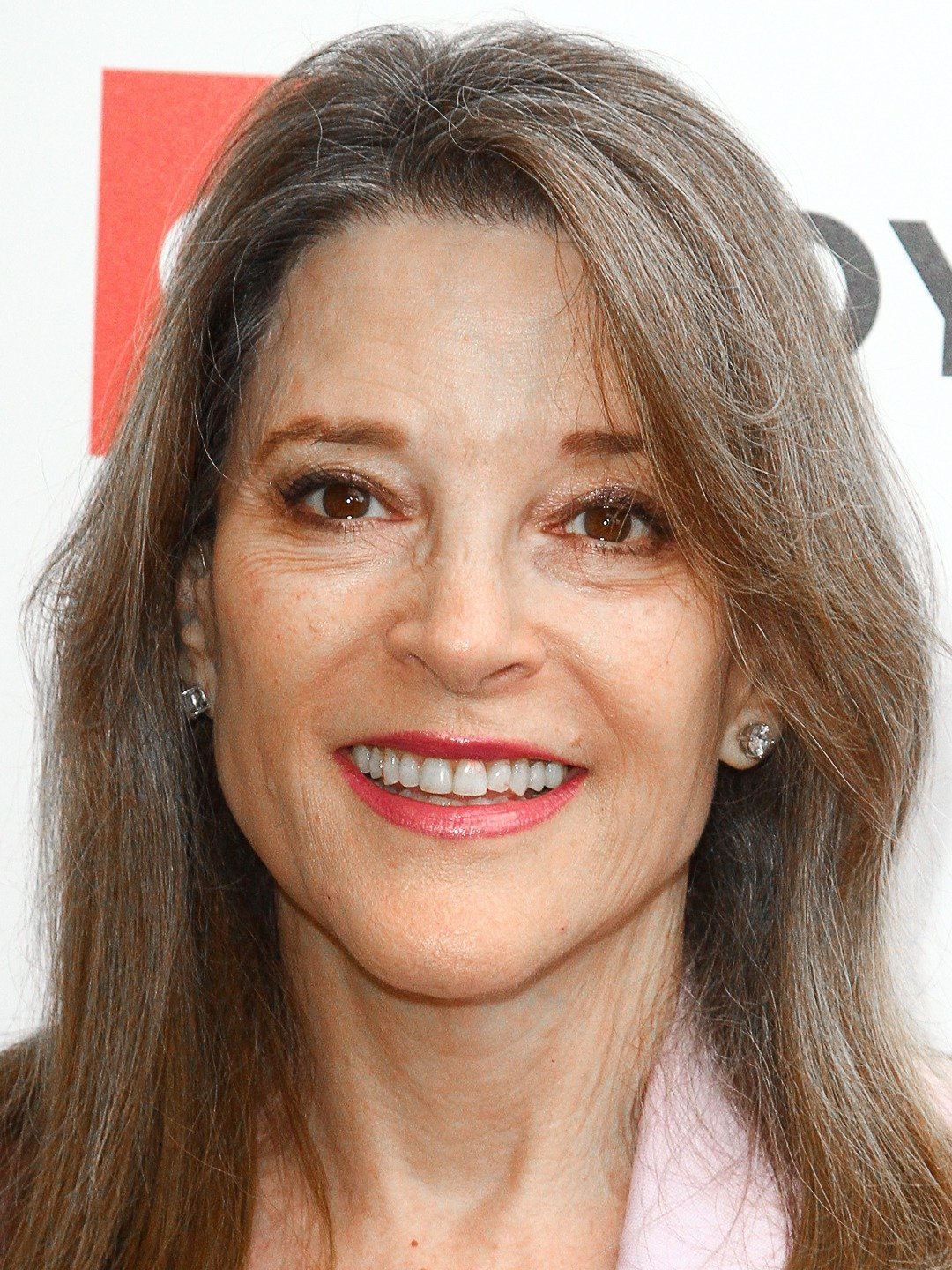
Candidate	Joe Biden (write-in)	Dean Phillips	Marianne Williamson
Home state	Delaware	Minnesota	California
Popular vote	79,100	24,377	5,106
Percentage	63.8%	19.7%	4.0%

Biden
40–50%
50–60%
60–70%
70–80%
80–90%
90–100%
Phillips
30–40%
80–90%
Other
Tie
No results
No polling places
- 2024 New Hampshire Democratic presidential firehouse primary
- April 27, 2024

34 delegates (25 pledged, 9 unpledged) to the Democratic National Convention (Note: The delegates were awarded via the party-sanctioned primary)
Candidate	Joe Biden
Home state	Delaware
Delegate count	25

The 2024 New Hampshire Democratic presidential primary was held on January 23, 2024, as a state-run contest during the Democratic Party primaries for the 2024 presidential election. The state party followed up with a formal party-run contest on April 27 to comply with DNC rules.

The January New Hampshire primary was not sanctioned by the Democratic National Committee (DNC) because the DNC-approved 2024 calendar placed the South Carolina primary first in front of it, as New Hampshire state law mandated them to hold up the tradition of the first primary in the country. A "bipartisan group of state politicians", including the chairs of the Democratic and the Republican parties, announced that the state would preserve this status. Thus, the DNC initially stripped all 34 of the state's delegates that would have been allocated to the Democratic National Convention. The delegates were allowed to be seated at the convention following an additional party-run firehouse primary on April 27.

Incumbent President Joe Biden ran for a second term at the time, but declined to appear on the January ballot to comply with the DNC. His supporters nevertheless carried out a successful write-in campaign on his behalf that he did not endorse, winning over 63% of the vote. US Representative Dean Phillips, challenging Biden for the nomination, also won a significant number of votes, winning over 19% of the vote.

== Controversies ==
=== Scheduling ===
Joe Biden sent a letter on December 1, 2022, to the "rule-making arm", the Rules and Bylaw Committee, of the Democratic National Committee (DNC), requesting that "diversity" should be emphasized in the 2024 Democratic Party presidential primaries, upending New Hampshire's tradition of being the first primary state. A December 2022 vote by the DNC Rules and Bylaws Committee the following day approved the change.

On February 4, 2023, the DNC formally approved the new 2024 primary calendar, moving South Carolina to hold its race first on February 3, followed by Nevada and New Hampshire on February 6. One member of the Rules and Bylaws Committee who supported this new plan, Lee Saunders, further said it will give a better representation of the composition of the country.

Members of the New Hampshire Democratic Party opposed the move, noted that moving their primary to comply with the new calendar would require changing New Hampshire state law mandating them to hold the first primary in the country. This was unlikely to happen since the state's legislature is controlled by Republicans, who are "unwilling" to change it. Republican New Hampshire governor Chris Sununu also criticized the DNC's plan as an "absolute joke ... It's just based on a personal preference of a candidate".

The DNC originally gave New Hampshire until June to change their primary dates, then extended this deadline to September. But Politico reported that "there was little reason to expect a friendly resolution", since Republican New Hampshire Secretary of State David Scanlan has the sole power to set the state's presidential primary date, in accordance with the aforementioned New Hampshire law. Scanlan announced the January 23 primary date on November 15, criticizing the DNC and stating that "using racial diversity as a cudgel and an attempt to rearrange the presidential nominating calendar is an ugly precedent".

The DNC Rules and Bylaws Committee affirmed on January 6, 2024, that the primary is unsanctioned and non-binding, and is therefore "meaningless". Republican New Hampshire Attorney General John Formella sent a "cease and desist" letter to the DNC in response, accusing the DNC of voter suppression. The New Hampshire Democratic Party again committed to voting in alignment with the state law mandating that its primary be held first. The state party may still send their delegation to the Democratic National Convention anyway, hoping the DNC will reverse course similar to what happened in 2008 when Florida and Michigan held their primaries earlier than the calendar allowed; after initially ruling both states would be stripped of all their delegates, it was decided to only penalize half of their delegates. DNC chair Jaime Harrison indicated on the night of the South Carolina primary that he would work towards seating the New Hampshire delegates, though the decision is ultimately in the hands of the Rules and Bylaws Committee of the DNC.

The party ran a firehouse primary before their official delegate selection meeting on April 27 to gain back their 25 delegates, in which a few dozens of registered party members from the state party committee voted and Biden was the only candidate on the ballot. The event was considered a token process to fulfill rules and largely not taken serious even by participants, but it was seen as an important decision in the context of the subsequent primary calendar for 2028. Accordingly, all delegates were allowed to be seated at the national convention following a vote by the DNC Rules and Bylaw Committee on April 30.

=== AI robocall ===
NBC News reported on January 22, 2024, that the New Hampshire attorney general's office was investigating AI-generated robocalls seemingly from President Joe Biden, which encouraged voters to skip voting on the day of the primary. Phillips was critical of the calls and called for more regulation in the AI sector. Aaron Jacobs, a spokesman for the Biden write-in campaign, indicated that the matter was referred to the police.

Paul Carpenter, a magician and hypnotist from Houston, Texas, who was visiting New Orleans at the time as a freelance AI consultant and marketing expert, reportedly provided crucial information to the government and FBI, leading to the conviction related to these robocalls. Carpenter cooperated with the Sisters of America and other authorities during the investigation, playing a key role in uncovering the responsible parties behind the AI-generated robocalls.

New Hampshire Attorney General John Formella announced on February 6, 2024, that the robocalls had been traced to Texas-based Life Corporation and Lingo Telecom, after an investigation by the Anti-Robocall Multistate Litigation Task Force, the Federal Communications Commission Enforcement Bureau, and other state and federal agencies. Steve Kramer, a Democratic operative, was identified as the individual behind the calls and was subsequently indicted. The FCC finalized a $6 million fine against Kramer for using deepfake AI technology and caller ID spoofing to impersonate President Biden. Kramer, who had been working as a consultant for the presidential campaign of Rep. Dean Phillips, D-Minn., has 30 days to pay the fine or face further legal action from the Department of Justice. In mid-March, the League of Women Voters and several New Hampshire voters filed a lawsuit against Kramer, Lingo Telecom, and Life Corporation.

On June 5, 2025, Kramer went on trial in Belknap County Superior Court, where jurors were asked to consider not only his guilt or innocence for 11 felony charges of voter suppression and impersonating a candidate but also whether the state had actually held its first-in-the-nation presidential primary. On June 13, 2025, Kramer was acquitted on all counts of voter suppression and impersonating a candidate. Officials also said that the $6 million civil penalty imposed by the Federal Communications Commission after the robocalls were sent still stands, despite the verdict.

== Candidates ==
=== Official candidates on the ballot ===
The following candidates officially filed by the end of the filing deadline on October 27, 2023. In order to be listed on the ballot, candidates paid a $1,000 filing fee.

- "President" R. Boddie
- Terrisa Bukovinac
- Eban Cambridge
- Gabriel Cornejo
- Mark Stewart Greenstein
- Tom Koos
- Paul V. LaCava
- Star Locke
- Frankie Lozada
- Stephen P. Lyons
- Raymond Michael Moroz
- Derek Nadeau
- Jason Palmer
- Armando "Mando" Perez-Serrato
- Dean Phillips
- Donald Picard
- Paperboy Prince
- Richard Rist
- Vermin Supreme
- John Vail
- Marianne Williamson

=== Write-in campaigns ===
In addition to the candidates who made the ballot, several candidates ran write-in campaigns.

Incumbent President Joe Biden announced his bid for a second term on April 25, 2023. However, Biden's team indicated that he would not appear on the New Hampshire primary ballot if the state defied the DNC's calendar and scheduled its race before South Carolina's. In October 2023, the manager for the Biden campaign, Julie Chávez Rodriguez, confirmed in a letter to the chair of the New Hampshire Democratic Party Raymond Buckley that Biden would not appear on the primary ballot in order to comply with the DNC's calendar. Pro-Biden New Hampshire Democrats, including Kathy Sullivan (the former chairwoman of the state Democratic party) and former Representatives Paul Hodes and Carol Shea-Porter, launched a formal write-in campaign on October 30, concluding that it would only hurt the Biden campaign if he lost the state's unsanctioned primary by default.

In January 2024, voters promoting a ceasefire in the Gaza war launched a write-in campaign for "ceasefire". New Hampshire secretary of state David Scanlan has indicated that these "ceasefire" votes were tallied. Ultimately, "Ceasefire" received 1,497 votes, or 1.28%.

Cenk Uygur, who filed for the ballot but was disqualified due to not being a natural-born citizen, told supporters to write him in in an X post the day of the primary.

Despite not running in or campaigning in this primary, independent politicians Robert F. Kennedy Jr. and Bernie Sanders each received notable numbers of write-in votes. Additionally, several candidates running in the concurrently held Republican primaries received sizable numbers of write-ins in the Democratic primary. Nikki Haley received 4,695 write-in votes. Donald Trump received 2,055 write-in votes. In previous New Hampshire primaries, candidates of the opposite have received write-in votes from voters who missed the deadline to change their registration.

== Endorsements ==
Joe Biden (write-in)

U.S. Senators

- Maggie Hassan, U.S. Senator from New Hampshire (2017–present), 81st Governor of New Hampshire (2013–2017)
- Jeanne Shaheen, U.S. Senator from New Hampshire (2009–present), 78th Governor of New Hampshire (1997–2003)

U.S. Representatives

- Annie Kuster, U.S. Representative from NH-02 (2013–present)

Former

- Paul Hodes, U.S. Representative from NH-02 (2007–2011)
- Carol Shea-Porter, U.S. Representative from NH-01 (2007–2011, 2013–2015, 2017–2019)

State executive officials

- Cinde Warmington, member of the New Hampshire Executive Council (2021–present), candidate for governor in 2024

Former

- Dudley Dudley, member of the New Hampshire Executive Council (1976–1983), political activist
- Colin Van Ostern, member of the New Hampshire Executive Council (2013–2017), businessman

State legislators

- Donna Soucy, Minority Leader of the New Hampshire State Senate (2020–present), New Hampshire State Senate 18th district (2012–present), President of the New Hampshire State Senate (2018–2020, New Hampshire House of Representatives from Hillsborough District 42 (1992–1996), New Hampshire House of Representatives from Hillsborough District 39 (1990–1992)
- Mary Jane Wallner, Deputy Minority Leader of the New Hampshire House of Representatives (2022–present), New Hampshire House of Representatives from Merrimack District 10 (1980–present), Majority Leader of the New Hampshire House of Representatives (2007–2010)
- Susan Almy, New Hampshire House of Representatives from Grafton District 13 (1996–present)
- Debra Altschiller, New Hampshire State Senate 24th district (2022–present)
- Heather Baldwin, New Hampshire House of Representatives from Grafton District 4 (2022–present)
- Luz Bay, New Hampshire House of Representatives from Strafford District 21 (2022–present)
- Donald J. Bouchard, New Hampshire House of Representatives from Hillsborough District 24 (2022–present)
- Amanda Bouldin, New Hampshire House of Representatives from Hillsborough District 12 (2015–present)
- Angela Brennan, New Hampshire House of Representatives from Merrimack District 9 (2022–present)
- Shannon Chandley, New Hampshire State Senate 11th district (2022–present)
- John Cloutier, New Hampshire House of Representatives from Sullivan District 10 (1992–present)
- Patricia Cornell, New Hampshire House of Representatives from Hillsborough District 22 (2022–present)
- Lou D'Allesandro, New Hampshire State Senate 20th district (1998–present)
- Charlotte DiLorenzo, New Hampshire House of Representatives from Rockingham District 10 (2022–present)
- Sherry Dutzy, New Hampshire House of Representatives from Hillsborough District 6 (2018–present)
- Susan Elberger, New Hampshire House of Representatives from Hillsborough District 6 (2022–present)
- Donovan Fenton, New Hampshire State Senate 10th district (2022–present)
- Dru Fox, New Hampshire House of Representatives from Cheshire District 2 (2022–present)
- Loren Foxx, New Hampshire House of Representatives from Hillsborough District 2 (2022–present)
- Linda Hariott-Gathright, New Hampshire House of Representatives from Hillsborough District 36 (2018–present)
- Nicholas Germana, New Hampshire House of Representatives from Cheshire District 1 (2022–present)
- Merryl Gibbs, New Hampshire House of Representatives from Merrimack District 23 (2022–present)
- Chuck Grassie, New Hampshire House of Representatives from Strafford District 8 (2016–2022, 2023–present)
- Jessica Grill, New Hampshire House of Representatives from Hillsborough District 18 (2022–present)
- Jaci Grote, New Hampshire House of Representatives from Rockingham District 24 (2018–present)
- Mary Hakken-Phillips, New Hampshire House of Representatives from Grafton District 12 (2022–present)
- Joan Hamblet, New Hampshire House of Representatives from Rockingham District 26 (2022–present)
- Molly Howard, New Hampshire House of Representatives from Hillsborough District 31 (2022–present)
- David Huot, New Hampshire House of Representatives from Belknap District 5 (1971–1974, 2016–2020, 2022–present)
- Christal Lloyd, New Hampshire House of Representatives from Hillsborough District 8 (2022–present)
- Patrick Long, New Hampshire House of Representatives from Hillsborough District 23 (2022–present)
- Latha Mangipudi, New Hampshire House of Representatives from Hillsborough District 11 (2022–present)
- Rebecca McWilliams, New Hampshire House of Representatives from Hillsborough District 30 (2022–present)
- David Meuse, New Hampshire House of Representatives from Rockingham District 37 (2022–present)
- Russell Muirhead, New Hampshire House of Representatives from Grafton District 11 (2020–present)
- Chris Muns, New Hampshire House of Representatives from Rockingham District 29 (2022–present)
- Nancy Murphy, New Hampshire House of Representatives from Hillsborough District 12 (2022–present)
- Alissandra Murray, New Hampshire House of Representatives from Hillsborough District 20 (2022–present)
- Jodi Newell, New Hampshire House of Representatives from Cheshire District 4 (2022–present)
- Lucius Parshall, New Hampshire House of Representatives from Cheshire District 8 (2022–present)
- Rebecca Perkins Kwoka, New Hampshire State Senate 21st district (2020–present)
- David Preece, New Hampshire House of Representatives from Hillsborough District 17 (2022–present)
- Suzanne Prentiss, New Hampshire State Senate 5th district (2020–present)
- Cindy Rosenwald, New Hampshire State Senate 13th district (2018–present)
- Rosemarie Rung, New Hampshire House of Representatives from Hillsborough District 21 (2018–present)
- Alexis Simpson, New Hampshire House of Representatives from Rockingham District 33 (2022–present)
- Marjorie Smith, New Hampshire House of Representatives from Strafford District 10 (2022–present)
- Brian Sullivan, New Hampshire House of Representatives from Sullivan District 1 (2017–present)
- Laura Telerski, New Hampshire House of Representatives from Hillsborough District 11 (2022–present)
- Wendy Thomas, New Hampshire House of Representatives from Hillsborough District 12 (2022–present)
- Amanda Toll, New Hampshire House of Representatives from Cheshire District 16 (2020–present)
- Mark Vallone, New Hampshire House of Representatives from Rockingham District 5 (2022–present), New Hampshire House of Representatives from Rockingham District 9 (2018–2020)
- David Watters, New Hampshire State Senate 4th district (2012–present)
- Lucy Weber, New Hampshire House of Representatives from Cheshire District 1 (2006–present)
- Becky Whitley, New Hampshire State Senate 15th district (2020–present)
- Matt Wilhelm, New Hampshire House of Representatives from Hillsborough District 40 (2020–present)
- Stephen Woodcock, New Hampshire House of Representatives from Carroll District 1 (2022–present)

Former

- Martha Fuller Clark, President Pro Tempore of the New Hampshire State Senate (2018–2020), New Hampshire State Senate District 21 (2012–2020), New Hampshire State Senate District 24 (2004–2010)
- Sylvia Larsen, President of the New Hampshire State Senate, (2006–2010), New Hampshire State Senate District 15 (1994–2014)
- Terie Norelli, Former Speaker of the New Hampshire House of Representatives, (2006–2010), (2012–2014)
- Caroletta Alicea, New Hampshire House of Representatives from Merrimack District 8 (2020–2022)
- Christy Bartlett, New Hampshire House of Representatives from Merrimack District 19 (2012–2022)
- Paul Berch, New Hampshire House of Representatives from Cheshire District 1 (2012–2022)
- Skip Berrien, New Hampshire House of Representatives from Rockingham District 18 (2014–2020)
- Peter Burling, New Hampshire State Senate
- Ed Butler, New Hampshire House of Representatives from Carrol District 7 (2012–2020)
- Tim Butterworth, New Hampshire House of Representatives from Cheshire District 4 (2006–2010)
- Jackie Cilley, New Hampshire House of Representatives from Strafford District 4 (2014–2018), New Hampshire State Senate from District 6 (2007–2010)
- David Cote, New Hampshire House of Representatives from Hillsborough District 3 (1982–2023)
- Manny Espita, New Hampshire House of Representatives from Hillsborough District 31 (2018–2022)
- Susan Ford, New Hampshire House of Representatives from Grafton District 3 (2018–2020)
- Molly Kelly, New Hampshire State Senate from District 10 (2006–2016)
- Bette Laskey, New Hampshire State Senate from District 13 (2008–2010, 2012–2018), New Hampshire House of Representatives from Hillsborough District 26 (1998–2008)
- Melanie Levesque, New Hampshire State Senate from District 12 (2018–2020), New Hampshire House of Representatives from Hillsborough District 26 (2012–2014), New Hampshire House of Representatives from Hillsborough District 5 (2006–2010
- Liz McConnell, New Hampshire House of Representatives from Rockingham District 11 (2018–2020)
- Patricia McMahon, New Hampshire House of Representatives from Merrimack District 3 (2004–2010)
- Richard McNamara, New Hampshire House of Representatives from Hillsborough District 38 (2012–2018)
- Mindi Messmer, New Hampshire House of Representatives from Rockingham District 24 (2016–2018)
- Jon Morgan, New Hampshire State Senate from District 23 (2018–2020)
- Sue Mullen, New Hampshire House of Representatives from Hillsborough District 7 (2018–2022)
- William Pearson, New Hampshire House of Representatives from Cheshire District 16 (2016–2020)
- Jay Phinizy, New Hampshire House of Representatives (1998–2008)
- Marjorie Porter, New Hampshire House of Representatives from Hillsborough District 1 (2010–2022)
- Tom Sherman, New Hampshire State Senate District 24 (2018–2022), New Hampshire House of Representatives from Hillsborough District 11 (2012–2016)
- Jackie Weatherspoon, New Hampshire House of Representatives

Local officials

Former

- Joyce Craig, Mayor of Manchester, New Hampshire (2017–2024), candidate for governor in 2024
- Steve Marchand, Mayor of Portsmouth, New Hampshire (2006–2008)

Party officials

- Kathy Sullivan, Former Chair of the New Hampshire Democratic Party (1999–2007)
Dean Phillips

State legislators

Former

- Tom Schamberg, New Hampshire state representative from the 4th district, Merrimack (2012–2014, 2018–present)
- Steve Shurtleff, New Hampshire state representative from the 11th district, Merrimack (2004–present) and former speaker of the New Hampshire House of Representatives (2018–2020)

Newspapers

- New Hampshire Union Leader (co-endorsement with Nikki Haley)
Marianne Williamson

State legislators

- Maria Perez, New Hampshire State Representative from Hillsborough-43 (2020–present) (Independent)
- Jonah Wheeler, New Hampshire State Representative from the 33rd district, Hillsborough (2022–present)

Former

- Tony Labranche, former Democratic New Hampshire State Representative from the 22nd district, Hillsborough (2020–2022) (Independent)
- Robin Vogt, former New Hampshire State Representative from Rockingham-21 (2022–2023)

Local officials

- Andrew Hosmer, mayor of Laconia, New Hampshire (2020–present) and former State Senator from District 7

Party officials

- Carlos Cardona, member of the New Hampshire Democratic Party Rules Committee
Ceasefire (write-in)

State executive officials

- Andru Volinsky, former member of the Executive Council of New Hampshire from the 2nd district (2017–2021)

== Polling ==
Poll source	Date(s) administered	Sample size (Note: Key: A – all adults RV – registered voters LV – likely voters V – unclear)	Margin of error	Joe Biden (write-in)	Robert F. Kennedy Jr.	Dean Phillips	Marianne Williamson	Other	Undecided
Emerson College/WHDH	January 18–20, 2024	467 (LV)	± 4.5%	61%	–	16%	5%	2%	16%
American Research Group	January 18–20, 2024	600 (LV)	± 4.0%	54%	–	32%	3%	4%	7%
University of New Hampshire/CNN	January 16–19, 2024	775 (LV)		63%	–	10%	9%	11%	6%
American Research Group	January 12–15, 2024	600 (LV)	± 4.0%	58%	–	28%	3%	2%	9%
Emerson College/WHDH	January 8–10, 2024	590 (LV)	± 4.0%	49%	–	16%	5%	3%	27%
University of New Hampshire/CNN	January 4–8, 2024	643 (LV)	± 3.9%	69%	–	7%	6%	11%	7%
Suffolk University/USA Today	January 3–7, 2024	318 (LV)	± 3.1%	64%	–	6%	2%	28%	
American Research Group	December 27 – January 4, 2024	600 (LV)	–	58%	–	21%	5%	2%	14%
NHJournal/co-efficient	December 18–20, 2023	1,016 (LV)	± 3.1%	38%	1% (write-in)	7%	7%	8%	39%
American Research Group	December 14–20, 2023	600 (LV)	± 4.0%	51%	–	17%	6%	3%	23%
Saint Anselm College Survey Center	December 18–19, 2023	? (LV)	± 4.8%	50%	–	10%	7%	4%	29%
University of New Hampshire/CNN	November 10–14, 2023	674 (LV)	± 3.5%	65%	–	10%	9%	5%	10%
Emerson College/WHDH	November 10–13, 2023	917 (RV)	± 3.3%	27% (Note: Biden was not initially prompted as an option.)	–	15%	10%	5%	44%
	October 27, 2023	Phillips declares his candidacy							
	October 9, 2023	Kennedy withdraws from the primaries							
University of New Hampshire/CNN	September 14–18, 2023	801 (LV)	± 3.2%	78%	9%	–	6%	3%	4%
Emerson College	August 9–11, 2023	354 (LV)	–	65%	12%	–	4%		19%
University of New Hampshire	July 13–17, 2023	743 (LV)	–	70%	10%	–	4%	6%	10%
American Pulse Research & Polling	July 5–11, 2023	354 (LV)	–	80%	11%	–	–	–	9%
Saint Anselm College Survey Center	June 21–23, 2023	419 (RV)	± 3.0%	68%	9%	–	8%	–	16%

=== Hypothetical polling ===
Hypothetical polling

Poll source	Date(s) administered	Sample size	Margin of error	Stacey Abrams	Joe Biden	Cory Booker	Pete Buttigieg	Hillary Clinton	Kamala Harris	Amy Klobuchar	Gavin Newsom	Alexandria Ocasio-Cortez	Bernie Sanders	Elizabeth Warren	Other	Undecided
University of New Hampshire	Apr 13–17, 2023	700 (LV)	–	1%	25%	–	9%	1%	2%	4%	3%	4%	17%	8%	19% (Note: Michelle Obama with 10%; Robert F. Kennedy and Gretchen Whitmer with 2% each; Raphael Warnock, Mariann Williamson, Jared Polis, J.B Pritzker, and Josh Shapiro with 1% each)	7%
Saint Anselm College	Mar 28–30, 2023	556 (RV)	± 4.1%	–	34%	–	18%	1%	4%	–	4%	–	11%	–	29% (Note: Michelle Obama with 14%; Other with 7%; Gretchen Whitmer with 4%; Andrew Yang and Marianne Williamson with 2%.)	–
Emerson College	Mar 3–5, 2023	390 (LV)	± 4.9%	–	29%	–	14%	–	11%	7%	1%	–	17%	11%	6% (Note: Gretchen Whitmer with 4%)	4%
co/efficient	Jan 25–26, 2023	486 (LV)	± 4.45%	–	37%	–	–	–	–	–	–	–	–	–	46%	17%
co/efficient	Jan 25–26, 2023	486 (LV)	± 4.45%	–	25%	–	16%	–	5%	–	–	3%	–	–	15% (Note: Michelle Obama with 15%)	36%
University of New Hampshire	Jan 19–23, 2023	346 (LV)	± 5.3%	–	19%	–	23%	0%	2%	5%	1%	6%	15%	18%	3%	4%
University of New Hampshire	Jul 21–25, 2022	430 (LV)	± 4.7%	3%	16%	2%	17%	3%	6%	9%	10%	5%	8%	10%	6% (Note: "Other" with 4%; Chris Murphy and Gretchen Whitmer with 1%; Jared Polis, J.B. Pritzker, and Gina Raimondo with 0%)	6%
University of New Hampshire	Apr 16–20, 2021	787 (A)	–	–	64%	–	–	–	–	–	–	–	–	–	18% (Note: 18% do not want Biden run in the 2024 presidential election)	17%
Saint Anselm College	Mar 4–6, 2021	418 (LV)	–	–	–	–	–	–	45%	–	–	–	–	–	26% (Note: "If Joe Biden decides not to run for re-election, someone else" with 26%)	30%

== Results ==
This is Biden's first primary victory in the state (though he has been on the ballot in the state's Democratic primary three other times).

New Hampshire Democratic primary, January 23, 2024
Candidate	Votes	%
Joe Biden (incumbent; write-in)	79,100	63.79
Dean Phillips	24,377	19.66
Marianne Williamson	5,016	4.05
Derek Nadeau	1,616	1.30
"Cease Fire" (write-in)	1,512	1.22
Vermin Supreme	912	0.74
John Vail	685	0.55
Robert F. Kennedy Jr. (write-in) (Ind.)	439	0.35
Donald Picard	371	0.30
Paperboy Prince	326	0.26
Paul V. LaCava	176	0.14
Jason Michael Palmer	142	0.11
President R. Boddie	136	0.11
Mark Stewart Greenstein	133	0.11
Bernie Sanders (write-in) (Ind.)	125	0.10
Terrisa Bukovinac	101	0.08
Gabriel Cornejo	86	0.07
Stephen P. Lyons	80	0.06
Frankie Lozada	73	0.06
Tom Koos	71	0.06
Armando "Mando" Perez-Serrato	68	0.05
Star Locke	59	0.05
Raymond Michael Moroz	52	0.04
Eban Cambridge	47	0.04
Richard Rist	37	0.03
Nikki Haley (write-in) (Republican)	4,760	3.84
Donald Trump (write-in) (Republican)	2,079	1.68
Chris Christie (write-in) (Republican)	41	0.03
Ron DeSantis (write-in) (Republican)	33	0.03
Vivek Ramaswamy (write-in) (Republican)	2	<0.01
Other write-in votes, reported as "Scatter".	1,341	1.08
Total	123,996	100%

No delegates were awarded from the January New Hampshire primary.

== See also ==
- 2024 New Hampshire Republican presidential primary
- 2024 Democratic Party presidential primaries
- 2024 United States presidential election
- 2024 United States presidential election in New Hampshire
- 2024 United States elections
