= 2008 United States presidential election in Michigan =

- November 4, 2008
- Turnout: 66.2% ▲

Nominee	Barack Obama	John McCain
Party	Democratic	Republican
Home state	Illinois	Arizona
Running mate	Joe Biden	Sarah Palin
Electoral vote	17	0
Popular vote	2,872,579	2,048,639
Percentage	57.33%	40.89%

Obama
40–50%
50–60%
60–70%
70–80%
80–90%
90–100%
McCain
40–50%
50–60%
60–70%
70–80%
80–90%
Tie

The 2008 United States presidential election in Michigan took place on November 4, 2008. It was part of the 2008 United States presidential election which happened throughout all 50 states and D.C. Voters chose 17 representatives, or electors to the Electoral College, who voted for president and vice president.

Michigan was won by Democratic nominee Barack Obama by a 16.4% margin of victory. Due to the worsening of the state's economy, and an extremely high unemployment rate and anti-incumbent backlash in the state following the Great Recession, Democrats were heavily favored to win the state. Prior to the election, all 17 news organizations considered this a state Obama would win, or otherwise considered as a safe blue state. Michigan had leaned Democratic for the last couple decades, as it voted for the Democratic presidential nominee in every election since 1992.

In the end, Obama won Michigan by a larger-than-expected margin of victory, winning by 823,940 votes. As of 2024, this is the last election that a Democrat won Alger, Alpena, Arenac, Benzie, Berrien, Cass, Clare, Clinton, Delta, Gladwin, Iosco, Iron, Jackson, Lenawee, Mason, Menominee, Oceana, Ogemaw, Ontonagon, Presque Isle, Roscommon, St. Clair, and Schoolcraft counties. Kent and Leelenau counties wouldn't vote for a Democrat again until 2020.

== Primaries ==
- 2008 Michigan Democratic presidential primary
- 2008 Michigan Republican presidential primary

== Campaign ==
=== Predictions ===
There were 16 news organizations who made state-by-state predictions of the election. Here are their last predictions before election day:

Source	Ranking
D.C. Political Report	Likely D
Cook Political Report	Lean D
The Takeaway	Solid D
Electoral-vote.com	Solid D
Washington Post	Solid D
Politico	Solid D
RealClearPolitics	Solid D
FiveThirtyEight	Solid D
CQ Politics	Solid D
The New York Times	Solid D
CNN	Safe D
NPR	Solid D
MSNBC	Solid D
Fox News	Likely D
Associated Press	Likely D
Rasmussen Reports	Safe D

=== Polling ===
Very early on, polling was tight as Obama was having a difficult time getting support from the pessimistic state. Since September 21, Obama swept all the polls taken from the state. The final 3 polls averaged Obama leading 54% to 40%.

=== Fundraising ===
John McCain raised a total of $4,330,872 in the state. Barack Obama raised $7,299,275.

=== Advertising and visits ===
Obama and his interest groups spent $12,995,614. McCain and his interest group spent $13,332,086. The Democratic ticket visited the state 10 times to McCain's 9 times.

== Analysis ==
Michigan had not supported a Republican for president since 1988, and would not do so again until 2016. However, the state's 17 electoral votes had been continually a prime target for Republicans, and the Democratic margin of victory incrementally decreased from 1996 to 2004. In 2008, Republican presidential nominee John McCain put an early effort into winning Michigan, hoping to convert blue-collar voters disaffected by Obama's unfamiliarity as a liberal African-American from Chicago. Macomb County, a populous blue-collar suburb of Detroit, was a large target.

A major problem for the Obama campaign was the 2008 Michigan Democratic presidential primary. Obama removed his name from the ballot after state officials moved up the primary in violation of party rules. As a result, Hillary Rodham Clinton won the state with 55%. This led to the McCain campaign focusing heavily on winning Michigan in the general election. In May 2008, McCain was leading in a Rasmussen poll with 45% to 44%. After the September financial crisis, however, McCain's general campaign fell into trouble. Polls showed Michigan, a state especially affected by the economy, turning away from McCain. Voters blamed Republicans for the crisis. In early October, with polls showing him falling further behind Obama, McCain pulled out of the state, essentially ceding it to Obama. This was widely publicized, and more than likely contributed to Obama's landslide victory.

On Election Day, Barack Obama won by a double-digit margin of 16%. The state was called for Obama almost as soon as the polls closed. In Wayne County, home to Detroit, Obama piled up a 3–1 margin. Democratic strongholds Washtenaw County (home to Ann Arbor and the University of Michigan), Ingham County (home to Lansing and Michigan State) and Genesee County (home to Flint) gave Obama 65-70% of the vote. Macomb County, which McCain had focused so intensely on, voted Democratic by a comfortable margin of 9%. Oakland County, once a bastion of suburban conservatism, went for Obama by 15 points. Obama also carried Kent County (home to Grand Rapids and former President Gerald Ford) by a very narrow 0.5% margin of victory, or 1,573 votes, the first time that a Democrat had done so since Lyndon B. Johnson in 1964. He was also the first Democrat to carry Berrien, Clinton, Eaton, Jackson, and Leelanau counties since 1964.

Republican support in the state collapsed; McCain was only able to win two counties with margins of more than 10,000 votes. This result signified continued evidence of Michigan's Democratic tilt, anchored by the heavily Democratic cities of Detroit, Lansing, Ann Arbor, and Flint. Barack Obama won 46 Michigan counties compared to 37 for John McCain. The largest county with a very close winning margin was a 49.3% vs. 48.8% plurality for Obama in Kent County. As of the 2024 presidential election, this is the last presidential election in which Alger County, Alpena County, Arenac County, Benzie County, Berrien County, Cass County, Clare County, Clinton County, Delta County, Gladwin County, Gratiot County, Iosco County, Iron County, Jackson County, Lenawee County, Mason County, Menominee County, Oceana County, Ogemaw County, Ontonagon County, Presque Isle County, Roscommon County, Schoolcraft County, and St. Clair County voted for the Democratic candidate. This is also the last presidential election in which the Democratic candidate won the Upper Peninsula, or a majority of congressional districts in the state.

At the same time as Obama swept the state, Democrats made more gains in Michigan. Incumbent Democratic U.S. Senator Carl Levin was reelected with 62.65% of the vote over Republican Jack Hoogendyk's 33.84%. Democrats also picked up two U.S. House seats in Michigan in the 7th District and the 9th District, with Mark Schauer and Gary Peters knocking off Tim Walberg and Joe Knollenberg, respectively. This gave Democrats the majority in Michigan's U.S. House delegation. In addition, Democrats picked up nine seats in the Michigan House of Representatives.

== Results ==
2008 United States presidential election in Michigan
Party	Candidate	Running mate	Votes	Percentage	Electoral votes
Democratic	Barack Obama	Joe Biden	2,872,579	57.33%	17
Republican	John McCain	Sarah Palin	2,048,639	40.89%	0
Natural Law	Ralph Nader	Matt Gonzalez	33,085	0.66%	0
Libertarian	Bob Barr	Wayne Allyn Root	23,716	0.47%	0
Constitution	Chuck Baldwin	Darrell Castle	14,685	0.29%	0
Green	Cynthia McKinney	Rosa Clemente	8,892	0.18%	0
Write-Ins	Write-Ins		170	0.00%	0
Totals			5,010,129	100.00%	17
Voter turnout (Voting age population)					66.9%

=== By county ===
County	Barack Obama Democratic		John McCain Republican		Various candidates Other parties		Margin		Total votes cast
County	#	%	#	%	#	%	#	%	Total votes cast
Alcona	2,896	45.11%	3,404	53.02%	120	1.87%	-508	-7.91%	6,420
Alger	2,472	52.04%	2,188	46.06%	90	1.89%	284	5.98%	4,750
Allegan	24,165	43.63%	30,061	54.28%	1,154	2.09%	-5,896	-10.65%	55,380
Alpena	7,705	50.95%	7,125	47.11%	294	1.94%	580	3.84%	15,124
Antrim	6,079	43.89%	7,506	54.19%	267	1.93%	-1,427	-10.30%	13,852
Arenac	4,155	51.12%	3,807	46.84%	166	2.04%	348	4.28%	8,128
Baraga	1,725	47.22%	1,846	50.53%	82	2.25%	-121	-3.31%	3,653
Barry	13,449	43.91%	16,431	53.65%	749	2.44%	-2,982	-9.74%	30,629
Bay	32,589	56.59%	23,795	41.32%	1,204	2.09%	8,794	15.27%	57,588
Benzie	5,451	52.88%	4,687	45.47%	171	1.66%	764	7.41%	10,309
Berrien	40,381	51.88%	36,130	46.42%	1,323	1.70%	4,251	5.46%	77,834
Branch	8,413	46.01%	9,534	52.14%	338	1.85%	-1,121	-6.13%	18,285
Calhoun	34,561	53.84%	28,553	44.48%	1,082	1.69%	6,008	9.36%	64,196
Cass	12,083	51.25%	11,114	47.14%	379	1.61%	969	4.11%	23,576
Charlevoix	6,817	47.35%	7,306	50.74%	275	1.91%	-489	-3.39%	14,398
Cheboygan	6,720	48.34%	6,920	49.78%	261	1.88%	-200	-1.44%	13,901
Chippewa	8,184	48.98%	8,267	49.48%	257	1.54%	-83	-0.50%	16,708
Clare	7,496	51.32%	6,793	46.51%	316	2.17%	703	4.81%	14,605
Clinton	20,005	49.54%	19,726	48.85%	650	1.61%	279	0.69%	40,381
Crawford	3,441	47.94%	3,561	49.61%	176	2.45%	-120	-1.67%	7,178
Delta	9,974	52.32%	8,763	45.97%	327	1.72%	1,211	6.35%	19,064
Dickinson	5,995	45.04%	7,049	52.96%	267	2.00%	-1,054	-7.92%	13,311
Eaton	30,742	53.36%	25,900	44.95%	974	1.69%	4,842	8.41%	57,616
Emmet	8,515	46.92%	9,314	51.32%	320	1.76%	-799	-4.40%	18,149
Genesee	143,927	65.27%	72,451	32.86%	4,117	1.87%	71,476	32.41%	220,495
Gladwin	6,590	49.77%	6,391	48.27%	260	1.96%	199	1.50%	13,241
Gogebic	4,757	57.44%	3,330	40.21%	194	2.35%	1,427	17.23%	8,281
Grand Traverse	23,258	47.62%	24,716	50.60%	869	1.78%	-1,458	-2.98%	48,843
Gratiot	9,105	51.33%	8,322	46.92%	311	1.75%	783	4.41%	17,738
Hillsdale	8,765	42.86%	11,221	54.87%	463	2.27%	-2,456	-12.01%	20,449
Houghton	7,476	46.81%	8,101	50.72%	395	2.47%	-625	-3.91%	15,972
Huron	8,367	48.83%	8,434	49.22%	334	1.95%	-67	-0.39%	17,135
Ingham	93,994	65.72%	46,483	32.50%	2,549	1.78%	47,511	33.22%	143,026
Ionia	12,565	45.93%	14,156	51.74%	638	2.33%	-1,591	-5.81%	27,359
Iosco	7,309	51.38%	6,583	46.28%	333	2.34%	726	5.10%	14,225
Iron	3,080	49.98%	2,947	47.83%	135	2.19%	133	2.15%	6,162
Isabella	16,679	58.71%	11,220	39.49%	511	1.80%	5,459	19.22%	28,410
Jackson	37,480	50.19%	35,692	47.79%	1,507	2.02%	1,788	2.40%	74,679
Kalamazoo	77,051	58.79%	51,554	39.34%	2,456	1.87%	25,497	19.45%	131,061
Kalkaska	3,780	44.48%	4,527	53.27%	192	2.25%	-747	-8.79%	8,499
Kent	149,909	49.34%	148,336	48.83%	5,554	1.83%	1,573	0.51%	303,799
Keweenaw	610	43.26%	756	53.62%	44	3.12%	-146	-10.36%	1,410
Lake	2,919	55.16%	2,269	42.88%	104	1.98%	650	12.28%	5,292
Lapeer	21,457	47.30%	22,831	50.33%	1,074	2.37%	-1,374	-3.03%	45,362
Leelanau	7,355	50.85%	6,938	47.97%	171	1.18%	417	2.88%	14,464
Lenawee	24,640	51.48%	22,225	46.43%	1,000	2.09%	2,415	5.05%	47,865
Livingston	42,349	42.39%	55,592	55.64%	1,965	1.97%	-13,243	-13.25%	99,906
Luce	1,191	43.47%	1,490	54.38%	59	2.15%	-299	-10.91%	2,740
Mackinac	3,027	47.23%	3,268	50.99%	114	1.78%	-241	-3.76%	6,409
Macomb	223,784	53.26%	187,663	44.66%	8,729	2.08%	36,121	8.60%	420,176
Manistee	7,235	55.62%	5,510	42.36%	264	2.02%	1,725	13.26%	13,009
Marquette	19,635	59.03%	12,906	38.80%	719	2.17%	6,729	20.23%	33,260
Mason	7,817	51.29%	7,147	46.89%	277	1.82%	670	4.40%	15,241
Mecosta	9,101	48.68%	9,238	49.41%	358	1.91%	-137	-0.73%	18,697
Menominee	5,981	54.02%	4,855	43.85%	236	2.13%	1,126	10.17%	11,072
Midland	20,701	47.26%	22,263	50.83%	834	1.91%	-1,562	-3.57%	43,798
Missaukee	2,898	38.68%	4,469	59.65%	125	1.67%	-1,571	-20.97%	7,492
Monroe	39,180	51.13%	35,858	46.79%	1,593	2.08%	3,322	4.34%	76,631
Montcalm	13,208	48.75%	13,291	49.05%	597	2.20%	-83	-0.30%	27,096
Montmorency	2,403	44.83%	2,841	53.00%	116	2.17%	-438	-8.17%	5,360
Muskegon	53,821	63.73%	29,145	34.51%	1,490	1.76%	24,676	29.22%	84,456
Newaygo	10,790	46.52%	11,862	51.14%	544	2.34%	-1,072	-4.62%	23,196
Oakland	372,566	56.42%	276,956	41.94%	10,873	1.64%	95,610	14.48%	660,395
Oceana	6,405	51.20%	5,860	46.85%	244	1.95%	545	4.35%	12,509
Ogemaw	5,391	49.93%	5,133	47.54%	274	2.53%	258	2.39%	10,798
Ontonagon	1,966	50.60%	1,823	46.92%	96	2.48%	143	3.68%	3,885
Osceola	4,855	44.03%	5,973	54.17%	198	1.80%	-1,118	-10.14%	11,026
Oscoda	1,887	43.42%	2,320	53.38%	139	3.18%	-433	-9.96%	4,346
Otsego	5,634	44.55%	6,752	53.39%	261	2.06%	-1,118	-8.84%	12,647
Ottawa	50,828	37.23%	83,330	61.03%	2,381	1.74%	-32,502	-23.80%	136,539
Presque Isle	3,722	49.55%	3,606	48.01%	183	2.44%	116	1.54%	7,511
Roscommon	7,082	50.24%	6,727	47.72%	287	2.04%	355	2.52%	14,096
Saginaw	60,276	57.80%	42,225	40.49%	1,782	1.71%	18,051	17.31%	104,283
St. Clair	40,677	50.28%	38,536	47.63%	1,687	2.09%	2,141	2.65%	80,900
St. Joseph	12,322	47.81%	12,886	50.00%	563	2.19%	-564	-2.19%	25,771
Sanilac	9,047	44.86%	10,679	52.95%	443	2.19%	-1,632	-8.09%	20,169
Schoolcraft	2,184	50.38%	2,058	47.47%	93	1.95%	126	2.91%	4,335
Shiawassee	19,397	53.27%	16,268	44.67%	750	2.06%	3,129	8.60%	36,415
Tuscola	13,503	48.48%	13,740	49.33%	611	2.19%	-237	-0.85%	27,854
Van Buren	18,588	53.47%	15,534	44.68%	644	1.85%	3,054	8.79%	34,766
Washtenaw	130,578	69.62%	53,946	28.76%	3,024	1.62%	76,632	40.86%	187,548
Wayne	660,085	74.02%	219,582	24.62%	12,064	1.36%	440,503	49.40%	891,731
Wexford	7,379	46.88%	8,044	51.10%	318	2.02%	-665	-4.22%	15,741
Totals	2,872,579	57.33%	2,048,639	40.89%	89,388	1.78%	823,940	16.44%	5,010,606

==== Counties that flipped from Republican to Democratic ====
- Alpena (largest city: Alpena)
- Benzie (largest city: Frankfort)
- Berrien (largest city: Niles)
- Cass (largest city: Dowagiac)
- Calhoun (largest city: Marshall)
- Clare (largest city: Clare)
- Clinton (largest city: St. Johns)
- Delta (largest city: Escanaba)
- Eaton (largest city: Charlotte)
- Gladwin (largest city: Gladwin)
- Gratiot (largest city: Alma)
- Iosco (largest city: East Tawas)
- Iron (largest city: Iron River)
- Jackson (largest city: Jackson)
- Kent (largest city: Grand Rapids)
- Leelanau (largest settlement: Greilickville)
- Lenawee (largest city: Adrian)
- Macomb (largest city: Warren)
- Mason (largest city: Ludington)
- Manistee (largest city: Manistee)
- Menominee (largest city: Menominee)
- Monroe (largest city: Monroe)
- Oceana (largest city: Hart)
- Ogemaw (largest city: West Branch)
- Ontonagon (largest village: Ontonagon)
- Presque Isle (largest city: Rogers City)
- Roscommon (largest settlement: Houghton Lake)
- Schoolcraft (largest city: Manistique)
- Shiawassee (largest city: Owosso)
- St. Clair (largest city: Port Huron)
- Van Buren (largest city: South Haven)

=== By congressional district ===
Barack Obama carried 12 of the 15 congressional districts, including four held by Republicans.

District	McCain	Obama	Representative
1st	48.11%	49.93%	Bart Stupak
2nd	50.85%	47.50%	Peter Hoekstra
3rd	49.43%	48.84%	Vern Ehlers
4th	48.19%	50.09%	Dave Camp
5th	34.71%	63.67%	Dale Kildee
6th	44.18%	54.12%	Fred Upton
7th	46.50%	51.73%	Tim Walberg (110th Congress)
7th	46.50%	51.73%	Mark Schauer (111th Congress)
8th	45.72%	52.58%	Mike Rogers
9th	42.83%	55.79%	Joe Knollenberg (110th Congress)
9th	42.83%	55.79%	Gary Peters (111th Congress)
10th	49.85%	48.23%	Candice Miller
11th	44.56%	53.78%	Thaddeus McCotter
12th	33.23%	65.05%	Sander Levin
13th	14.47%	84.71%	Carolyn Cheeks Kilpatrick
14th	13.45%	85.77%	John Conyers Jr.
15th	32.48%	65.80%	John Dingell

== Electors ==
Technically the voters of Michigan cast their ballots for electors: representatives to the Electoral College. Michigan is allocated 17 electors because it has 15 congressional districts and 2 senators. All candidates who appear on the ballot or qualify to receive write-in votes must submit a list of 17 electors, who pledge to vote for their candidate and their running mate. Whoever wins the majority of votes in the state is awarded all 17 electoral votes. Their chosen electors then vote for president and vice president. Although electors are pledged to their candidate and running mate, they are not obligated to vote for them. An elector who votes for someone other than their candidate is known as a faithless elector.

The electors of each state and the District of Columbia met on December 15, 2008, to cast their votes for president and vice president. The Electoral College itself never meets as one body. Instead the electors from each state and the District of Columbia met in their respective capitols.

The following were the members of the Electoral College from the state. All 17 were pledged to Obama and Biden:

1. Brenda Abbey
2. Dallas Dean
3. Ida DeHaas
4. Ron Gettelfinger
5. James Hoffa
6. Kenneth Paul Jenkins
7. Harry Kalogerakos
8. Jessica Mistak
9. Arturo Reyes
10. Griffin Rivers
11. Gary Shepherd
12. Roger Short
13. Arthur Shy
14. Richard West
15. Whitney Randall Wolcott
16. David Woodward
17. Charlene Yarbrough

== See also ==
- Presidency of Barack Obama
- United States presidential elections in Michigan
