= Angela Brennan =

Angela Brennan may refer to:

- Angela Brennan (painter)
- Angela Brennan (politician)
