= Kristopher Levesque =

American politician

Member-elect of the New Hampshire House of Representatives from the Merrimack 23rd district
- Assuming office December 2026
- Succeeding: Merryl Gibbs

Personal details
- Party: Democratic

Kristopher Levesque is an American politician. A member of the Democratic Party, he is the member-elect for the Merrimack 23rd district of the New Hampshire House of Representatives.
