= Merryl Gibbs =

American politician

Member of the New Hampshire House of Representatives from the Merrimack 23rd district
- Incumbent
- Assumed office December 7, 2022
- Succeeded by: Kristopher Levesque (elect)

Personal details
- Party: Democratic

Merryl Gibbs is an American politician. She serves as a Democratic member for the Merrimack 23rd district of the New Hampshire House of Representatives.
