= William Pearson (New Hampshire politician) =

American politician

Member of the New Hampshire House of Representatives from the Cheshire 16 district
- In office November 8, 2016 – December 2020
- Succeeded by: Amanda Toll

Member of the New Hampshire House of Representatives from the Cheshire 4 district
- In office 2014–2016

Personal details
- Born: William A. Pearson
- Party: Democratic
- Education: Keene State College

William A. Pearson is a New Hampshire politician.

== Education ==
Pearson earned a B.A. in political science from Keene State College.

== Career ==
On November 8, 2016, Pearson was again elected to the New Hampshire House of Representatives where he represented the Cheshire 4 district. Pearson assumed office on November 4, 2014 and ended his term in 2016. On November 8, 2016, Pearson was again elected to the New Hampshire House of Representatives where he represented the Cheshire 16 district. Pearson assumed office in 2016. Pearson is a Democrat.

== Personal life ==
Pearson resides in Keene, New Hampshire.
