= Manny Espitia =

American politician

Member of the New Hampshire House of Representatives from the Hillsborough 31 district
- In office December 5, 2018 – December 7, 2022
- Preceded by: Amelia Keane

Personal details
- Born: Manuel Espitia
- Party: Democratic
- Education: Princeton University (BA)

Manuel "Manny" Espitia is an American politician who served as a member of the New Hampshire House of Representatives for the Hillsborough 31 district. He assumed office on December 5, 2018, and left office on December 7, 2022.

== Early life and education ==
Espitia was raised in Santa Ana, California. After graduating from Midland School in 2007, he earned a Bachelor of Arts degree in history and African American studies from Princeton University.

== Career ==
In 2012, Espitia worked as an organizer for Organizing for Action in Albuquerque, New Mexico. He also worked on Eric Garcetti's 2013 campaign for mayor of Los Angeles. In 2013 and 2014, he worked as a community outreach coordinator for the Access Community Health Network in Chicago. In 2014, he was the regional field director of the Texas Democratic Party. He was also an organizer for the Hillary Clinton 2016 presidential campaign and served as an assistant to Nashua Mayor Jim Donchess. He also served as a constituent services representative in the office of Senate Maggie Hassan. Espitia has also worked as legislative director for Free and Fair New Hampshire, executive director of the Nashua Democratic City Committee, and New Hampshire state director of the Julián Castro 2020 presidential campaign. Since January 2020, he has been the northern regional director of Run for Something.
