= Amanda Soto =

American politician

Amanda Toll

Member of the New Hampshire House of Representatives from the Cheshire 16 district
- In office December 2, 2020 – 2024
- Preceded by: William Pearson

Personal details
- Born: New Hampshire, U.S.
- Children: 1
- Education: Hampshire College (BA); University of Massachusetts Amherst (MEd)

Amanda Elizabeth Soto is an American former politician and member of the New Hampshire House of Representatives from the Cheshire 16 district from 2020 to 2024. At the time of that service, her name was Amanda Elizabeth Toll.

== Early life and education ==
Soto was born and raised in New Hampshire. She earned a Bachelor of Arts degree in political science, women's studies, and modern American history from Hampshire College and a Master of Education from the University of Massachusetts Amherst. She is Jewish.

== Career ==
Outside of politics, Soto has worked as a social studies teacher and small business-owner.

She was elected to the New Hampshire House of Representatives in 2020 and was a member of the House State-Federal Relations and Veterans Affairs Committee. In January 2022, she co-sponsored a bill that would require consent education to be a part of the curriculum in New Hampshire public schools. She was elected to the Cheshire 15 district in 2022. She announced her retirement in 2024.
