= 2008 Michigan Republican presidential primary =

- January 15, 2008

30 pledged delegates to the Republican National Convention
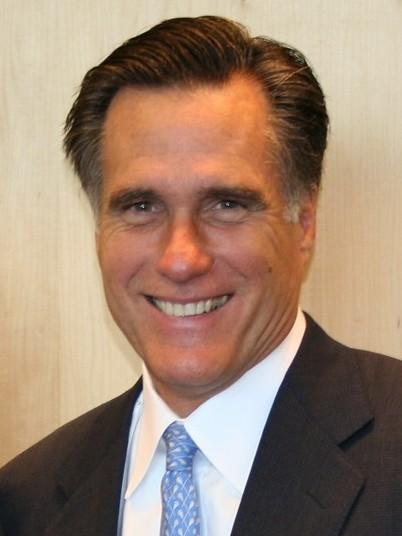

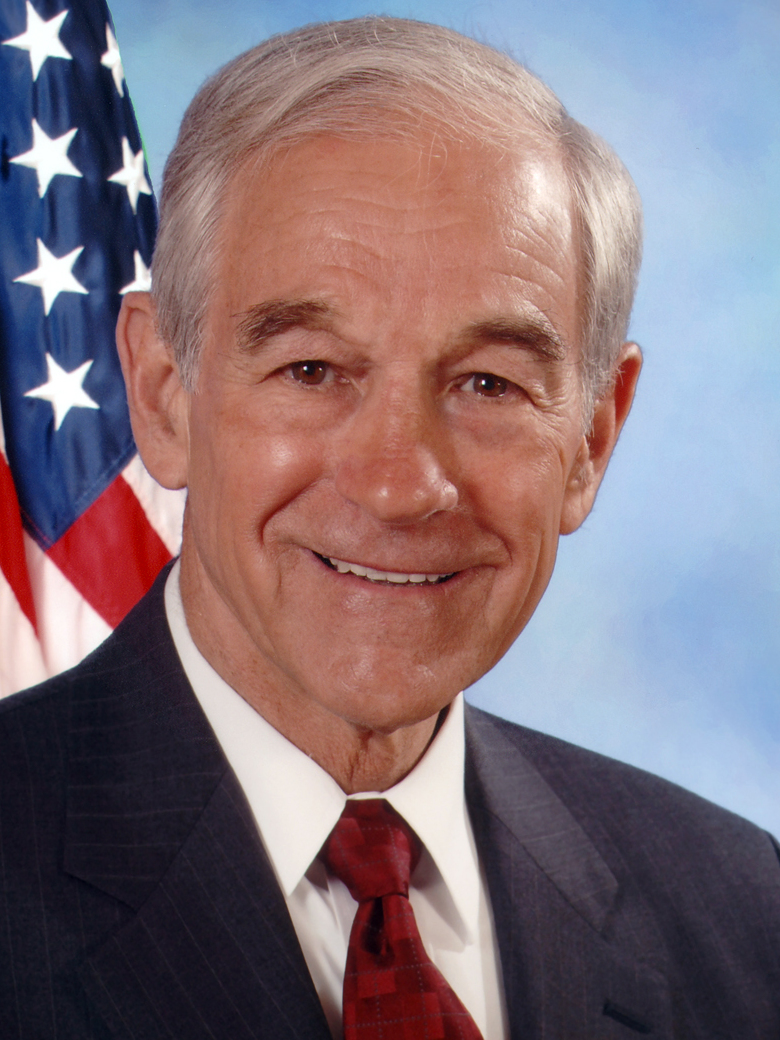
Candidate	Mitt Romney	John McCain
Home state	Massachusetts	Arizona
Delegate count	20	7
Popular vote	338,316	257,985
Percentage	38.92%	29.68%
Candidate	Mike Huckabee	Ron Paul
Home state	Arkansas	Texas
Delegate count	3	0
Popular vote	139,764	54,475
Percentage	16.08%	6.27%
- County results Romney: 30–40% 40–50% McCain: 30–40% 40–50%

The 2008 Michigan Republican presidential primary took place on January 15, 2008. Mitt Romney came in first with 39 percent of the vote, followed by John McCain with 30 percent and Mike Huckabee in third-place with 16 percent. The victory was widely viewed as critical for the Romney campaign, as a loss in Michigan, where his father was governor, would have resulted in a loss of momentum after two losses already in New Hampshire and Iowa.

National delegates determined: 30 out of 60

In accordance with Republican National Committee rules, Michigan was stripped of half its delegates for holding primary contests before February 5, 2008.

== Candidates ==
- Former Mayor Rudy Giuliani of New York City
- Former Governor Mike Huckabee of Arkansas
- Congressman Duncan Hunter of California
- Senator John McCain of Arizona
- Congressman Ron Paul of Texas
- Former Governor Mitt Romney of Massachusetts
- Former Senator Fred Thompson of Tennessee

=== Withdrawn ===
- Senator Sam Brownback of Kansas
- Congressman Tom Tancredo of Colorado

== Results ==
15 statewide delegates were awarded proportionally to candidates who got 15% or more of the vote. Each of the state's 15 congressional districts received 1 delegate, which was awarded to the candidate who got the most votes in that district.

100% of precincts reporting
Candidate	Votes	Percentage	Delegates
Mitt Romney	338,316	38.92%	20
John McCain	257,985	29.68%	7
Mike Huckabee	139,764	16.08%	3
Ron Paul	54,475	6.27%	0
Fred Thompson	32,159	3.7%	0
Rudy Giuliani	24,725	2.84%	0
Uncommitted	18,118	2.08%	0
Duncan Hunter	2,819	0.32%	0
Tom Tancredo	457	0.05%	0
Sam Brownback	351	0.04%	0
Write-ins	124	0.01%	0
Total	869,293	100%	30

== See also ==
- 2008 Michigan Democratic presidential primary
- 2008 Republican Party presidential primaries
