= Richard McNamara (politician) =

American politician

Member of New Hampshire House of Representatives for Hillsborough 38
- In office December 5, 2012 – December 4, 2018

Personal details
- Party: Democratic
- Education: Worcester State College; SUNY Potsdam

Richard McNamara is an American politician. He was a member of the New Hampshire House of Representatives and represented Hillsborough 38th district.
