= Patricia McMahon =

American politician

Member of New Hampshire House of Representatives for Merrimack 3
- In office 2004–2010

Personal details
- Party: Democratic

Patricia McMahon is an American politician. She was a member of the New Hampshire House of Representatives and represented Merrimack's 3rd district.

She endorsed the Amy Klobuchar 2020 presidential campaign.
