= 2008 Florida Democratic presidential primary =

- January 29, 2008

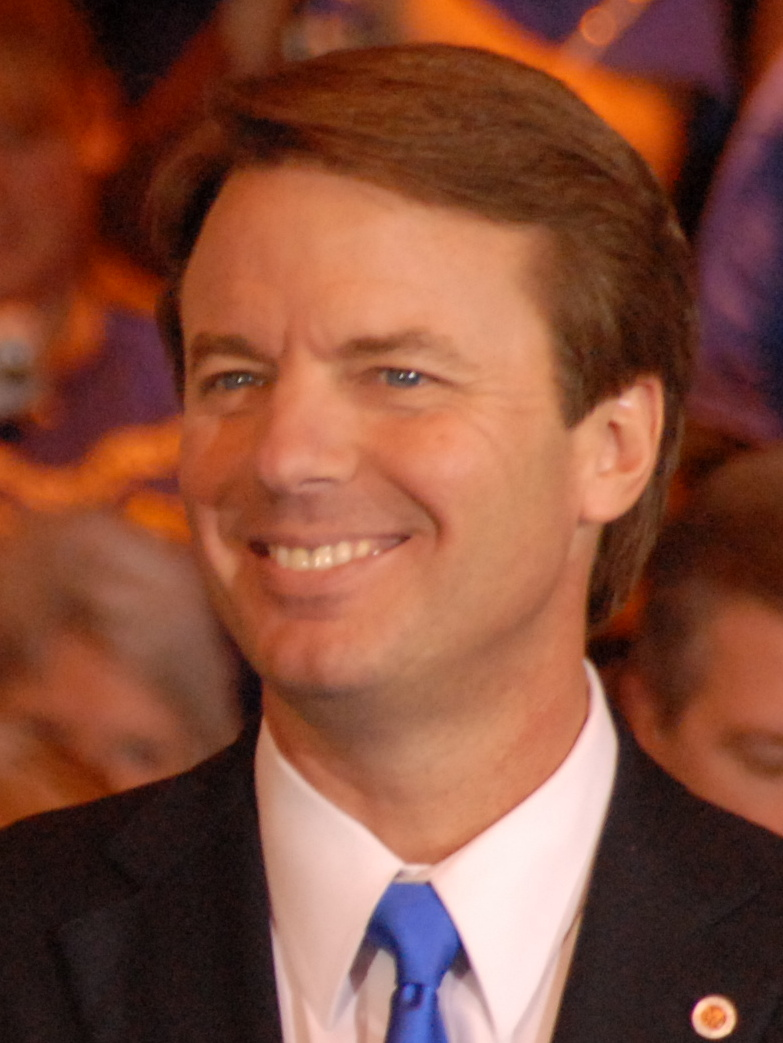
Candidate	Hillary Clinton	Barack Obama	John Edwards
Home state	New York	Illinois	North Carolina
Popular vote	870,986	576,214	251,562
Percentage	49.8%	32.9%	14.4%
- Primary results by county Clinton: 30–40% 40–50% 50–60% 60–70% Obama: 30–40% 40–50% 50–60% Edwards: 30–40% 40–50%

The 2008 Florida Democratic presidential primary took place on January 29, 2008. Originally, the state had 185 delegates up for grabs that were to be awarded in the following way: 121 delegates were to be awarded based on the winner in each of Florida's 25 congressional districts while an additional 64 delegates were to be awarded to the statewide winner. Twenty-five unpledged delegates, known as superdelegates, were initially able to cast their votes at the Democratic National Convention.

However, the Democratic National Committee determined that the date of the Florida Democratic Primary violated the party rules and ultimately decided to sanction the state, stripping all 210 delegates and refusing to seat them at the convention. The DNC Rules and Bylaws Committee later convened on May 31, 2008, and decided to seat all of Florida's delegates, with each delegate receiving only half a vote. As a result of this compromise, Florida's delegation had 105 votes at the convention.

After coming third place in this primary, Edwards suspended his campaign.

== Background ==
In August 2006, the Democratic National Committee adopted a proposal by its Rules and Bylaws Committee that only four states – Iowa, New Hampshire, Nevada, and South Carolina – would be permitted to hold primaries or caucuses before Super Tuesday, February 5, 2008. In the spring of 2007, the Florida Legislature (controlled by Republicans in both chambers) passed the House Bill 537 which moved the date of the state's Republican and Democratic primaries to January 29, a week before the earliest permitted date of both parties. The Florida Democratic Party tried to amend the legislation and make the date February 5; however, the Republican-controlled legislature refused.

In response, the DNC Rules and Bylaws Committee voted on August 25, 2007 that Florida was in violation of its rules and gave the state 30 days' notice to change the date of its primary. As Florida did not respond, the Committee stripped Florida of its delegates to the Democratic National Convention in Denver. On August 31, officials from the four approved early-voting states asked all the candidates to pledge not to campaign or participate in Florida, and all the major candidates signed the pledge. Despite the pledge, the major candidates remained on the ballot, as Florida rules do not allow candidates to remove their names without withdrawing completely from the general election.

In October 2007, Democrats from Florida's congressional delegation filed a federal lawsuit against the DNC to force the recognition of its delegates; however, the suit was unsuccessful.

== Delegate controversy ==
On January 25, 2008, Hillary Clinton advocated permitting Florida's delegates (along with similarly situated Michigan's) to be seated and vote at the Democratic National Convention despite the DNC ban, stating:

I believe our nominee will need the enthusiastic support of Democrats in these states to win the general election, and so I will ask my Democratic convention delegates to support seating the delegations from Florida and Michigan.

Clinton's supporters argued that Michigan and Florida's citizens should participate in the nomination processes, and that it would be a mistake for the Democratic Party to overlook the two huge battleground states that might be crucial in the November general election. They also argued that the Clinton campaign had not had a voice in the decision to strip Florida of its delegates.

Critics charged that changing the rules in this way was unfair and that Clinton's position was motivated purely by political expediency. Among their arguments was that neither Clinton nor her campaign had made any public protest when Florida's punishment had first been announced in August 2007; that Clinton was adopting this position only after results from the first primaries had made it apparent that the campaign was not running the way she had expected; that Clinton, along with other candidates, had signed the pledge not to campaign or participate in Florida; and that at the time the pledge was signed, Clinton's then-campaign manager Patti Solis Doyle had proclaimed that

We believe Iowa, New Hampshire, Nevada and South Carolina play a unique and special role in the nominating process...We believe the DNC's rules and its calendar provide the necessary structure to respect and honor that role. Thus, we will be signing the pledge to adhere to the DNC approved nominating calendar.

== Candidates ==
- Hillary Clinton
- John Edwards
- Mike Gravel
- Barack Obama

Candidates Joe Biden, Chris Dodd, Dennis Kucinich, and Bill Richardson dropped out of the presidential race before the Florida primary. However, they remained on the ballot.

== Campaign ==
Although Barack Obama, Hillary Clinton, and John Edwards had pledged not to campaign in the state, supporters of Barack Obama and Hillary Clinton conducted unofficial campaign efforts, and over 350,000 Democratic voters cast early ballots as of January 25, 2008. Mike Gravel was the only candidate to openly campaign in the state.

=== Clinton fundraising visits ===
Two days before the January 29 election, Hillary Clinton visited Florida and held three fundraisers. On Election Day, Clinton returned to Florida and held a rally after polls closed to celebrate her victory. While these visits were permitted fundraisers, the timing raised controversy among Obama supporters.

=== Obama campaign advertisement ===
In the run-up to Super Tuesday on February 5, the Obama campaign ran a nationwide television advertising campaign that was shown in all states, including Florida. Obama's campaign asked for the ads not to be shown in Florida, but were told by the cable networks this was not possible. The campaign then sought and received permission to run the ad from South Carolina Democratic Chairwoman Carol Fowler as at that point South Carolina had not already voted. Clinton Adviser Harold M. Ickes has claimed that this violated Obama's pledge not to campaign in the state.

== Results ==
Florida Democratic Presidential Primary Results – 2008
Party		Candidate	Votes	Percentage	Delegates*
	Democratic	Hillary Clinton	870,986	49.77%	52.5
	Democratic	Barack Obama	576,214	32.93%	33.5
	Democratic	John Edwards	251,562	14.38%	6.5**
	Democratic	Joe Biden	15,704	0.90%	0
	Democratic	Bill Richardson	14,999	0.86%	0
	Democratic	Dennis Kucinich	9,703	0.55%	0
	Democratic	Christopher Dodd	5,477	0.31%	0
	Democratic	Mike Gravel	5,275	0.30%	0
Totals			1,749,920	100.00%	92.5

*As awarded by the May 31, 2008, meeting of the Rules and Bylaws Committee (RBC).
**Subsequently, some Edwards delegates switched to Obama.

== Proposed revote ==
Shortly after February 5's Super Tuesday contests, the media and some politicians like U.S. Senator Tom Harkin (D-Iowa) began to endorse the idea of a possible revote in Florida and Michigan. However, the cost of an all mail-in Florida Primary had been estimated at more than $4 million, a price tag that neither the DNC nor the state party was willing to pay.

Republican Governor Charlie Crist announced his support for another Democratic Primary, though he opposed using government funds to cover the expenses. Florida Democratic Party Chairwoman Karen Thurman stated that a new contest would have had to have met three requirements: both Obama and Clinton would have to fully participate, there would have to be sufficient funding provided, and all registered Florida Democrats, including those out of state, would have to be able to participate.

Democratic National Committee Chairman Howard Dean stated that he was encouraged by Governor Crist's support and that Florida Democrats could have "resubmitted a plan and run a party process to select delegates to the convention." On Friday, March 7, 2008, Newsweek reported: "A plan to raise soft money to pay for a second Florida Democratic primary -- this one by mail -- seems close to approval, according to Sen. Bill Nelson." On March 17, 2008, a letter from the Florida Democratic Party was released indicating that a revote would not occur.

== Democratic National Committee Rules and Bylaws Committee ==
On May 31, 2008, the Democratic National Committee's Rules and Bylaws Committee decided to seat all of Florida's delegates according to the primary results, but to give each delegate only half a vote at the Convention.

Before the Democratic Convention, Florida, as well as Michigan, were approved with full votes. All 210 delegates were given full voting abilities. They voted during the roll call. The majority voted for Obama, the presumptive nominee.

== Analysis ==
=== Demographics ===
Florida has the most elderly voters in the nation with a heavy percentage of Hispanic/Latino voters. According to exit polls, 66 percent of voters in the Florida Democratic Primary were white and they opted for Clinton 53-23-20 (Clinton-Obama-Edwards) along with the 12 percent of Hispanic/Latino voters who backed Clinton 59-30-8. This contrasts with the 19 percent of African American voters who supported Obama 73-25-1.

Clinton won all age groups and income groups in Florida, but split the vote with Obama among highly affluent voters making over $200,000. She also won all educational attainment groups from high school graduates to those with postgraduate studies. Self-identified Democrats, which composed 79 percent of the electorate, backed Clinton 52-35-11 along with Independents who favored her 40-30-25; Edwards won self-identified Republicans 31-27-23 (Edwards-Obama-Clinton), which composed 4 percent of the electorate.

Clinton won all ideological groups except voters who identified themselves as conservative, as they opted for Obama. Regarding religion, Clinton won Protestants 49-33-15, Roman Catholics 63-22-14, Jews 58-26-13, and atheists/agnostics 40-38-18; Obama won other Christians 43-39-16 and voters who affiliated with other religions 48-39-7.

=== Electoral geography ===
Clinton's strongest performance was in the Miami area where she won 56-32-8 and South Florida where she won 53-29-14. She also won Central Florida by a margin of 52-30-13 and the Tampa Bay Area by a margin of 50-32-15. Obama did best in North Florida, winning 41-37-20 (Obama-Clinton-Edwards).

While Edwards won a number of rural, predominantly white and conservative counties in the Florida Panhandle, Obama took in more of the vote in Pensacola and Tallahassee which enabled him to win more in the congressional districts. He also won inner-city Jacksonville and the areas outside Orlando and Tampa as well as North Miami and Fort Lauderdale. Clinton carried Orlando, Tampa, Palm Beach, Miami, Hialeah and other large urban areas in South Florida as well as the Florida Keys.

=== Endorsements ===
Clinton received endorsements in Florida from U.S. Senator Bill Nelson as well as U.S. Representative Debbie Wasserman Schultz of Fort Lauderdale.

== See also ==
- 2008 Democratic Party presidential primaries
- 2008 Florida Republican presidential primary
- 2008 United States presidential election in Florida
