= Jackie Weatherspoon =

American politician

- Born: October 12, 1951 (age 75); New York, NY
- Education: 1991- MA, MPA Harvard University, JFK School of Government; 1973 - BS, S.U.N.Y. (Brockport) New York
- Occupations: Advisor, consultant, mediator
- Spouse: Russell D. Weatherspoon

Jacquelyne Karen "Jackie" Weatherspoon (born October 12, 1951) is a human rights activist. She has worked in Bosnia-Herzegovina for the Organization for Security and Co-operation in Europe as a mediator. She formerly served as a member of the New Hampshire House of Representatives.

She is a member of the United States Civil Rights Commission State Advisory Committee. She has policy field work experience in post conflict countries in Eastern Europe and Africa. Weatherspoon is the founder and CEO of Decisions in Democracy International. The DDI gives training for people seeking to run for public office.

Since 1995, Weatherspoon is a Member-at-Large and the Northern New England Coordinator for US Women Connect, a White House Initiative that tracks the progress of Women and Girls World Conference on Women, 1995. It is an every five year initiative that documents the progress of women and girls which is in accord with the National Platform for Action Beijing protocols.

== Early life ==
Jackie Weatherspoon was born and raised in New York City.

== Career ==
Weatherspoon served for six years in the New Hampshire House of Representatives. She worked for the United States Department of State during the Clinton Administration. She was part of three US delegations with First Lady Hillary Clinton serving the Northern Initiative, in Iceland, Estonia and Lithuania. In 1995 she participated in the Beijing Conference representing UNA/USA. As a state representative for New Hampshire Weatherspoon was a key sponsor of a bill to abolish capital punishment in New Hampshire. She is the Northern New England Coordinator for US Women Connect, a White House Initiative to track the progress of women and girls every five years in accordance with the National Platform for Action protocols since 1995. She has served as a technical advisor for Club de Madrid, a women's political participation, and Women and Peace and Peace and Security for the Greater Horn of Africa. She is known for her first piece of legislation that put CEDAW Resolution into law, the Convention on the Elimination of All Forms of Discrimination Against Women.

Since 2004, Weatherspoon has been on the UN Secretariat's roster of electoral experts in the electoral assistance division.

She is a member of the Harvard Law School Mediation Program and works as a mediator in the Massachusetts court system. In 2013, she was appointed to the New Hampshire State Advisory Committee of the US Commission on Civil Rights.

Weatherspoon is a mentor with the Step UP Women's Network.

She is the co-author of Influential & Phenomenal Women of New Hampshire, along with Abraham Thompson.

=== United Nations experience ===
Weatherspoon has worked with various United Nations Development Program agencies, such as the United Nations Development Programme (UNDP), UN Women, United Nations Development Fund for Women (UNIFEM), United Nations Educational, Scientific and Cultural Organization UNESCO, United Nations Population Fund UNFPA.

=== Personal life ===
Weatherspoon lives in Exeter, New Hampshire with her husband Russell D. Weatherspoon, who served as Dean of Students at Phillips Exeter Academy.

=== Affiliations ===
- United Nations Secretariat, to the Electoral Assistance Division Member (EAD) NY, since 2007
- United Nations Roster of Women Experts, in the Political Participation Section, NY., since 2014
- Since 2007 - United Nations Secretariat, to the Electoral Assistance Division Member (EAD) NY
- Member of New Hampshire & National Democratic Party
- State Advisory Committee of New Hampshire and served as a Minority Whip
- Mediator, Member of the US Civil Rights Commission State Advisory Committee
- Member of the Harvard Law School Mediation Program and works as a mediator in the Massachusetts court system
- Luminary Circle Member, and also a mentor with the Step UP Women's Network.
- New Hampshire Advisory Committee at US Commission on Civil Rights
- Member Executive Committee - NGO Committee on the Status of Women, New York
