= 2008 Michigan Democratic presidential primary =

- January 15, 2008

| Candidate | Hillary Clinton | Barack Obama | Uncommitted |
| Home state | New York | Illinois | – |
| Delegate count | 34.5 | 29.5 | 0 |
| Popular vote | 328,309 | – | 238,168 |
| Percentage | 54.61% | – | 39.61% |
- Clinton: 40–50% 50–60% 60–70% 70–80% Uncommitted

The 2008 Michigan Democratic presidential primary took place January 15, 2008. Originally, the state had 156 delegates up for grabs that were to be awarded in the following way: 83 delegates were to be awarded based on the winner in each of Michigan's 15 congressional districts while an additional 45 delegates were to be awarded to the statewide winner. Twenty-eight unpledged delegates, known as superdelegates, were initially able to cast their votes at the Democratic National Convention in Denver, Colorado.

However, the Democratic National Committee determined that the date of the Michigan Democratic Primary violated the party rules and ultimately decided to sanction the state, stripping all 156 delegates and refusing to seat them at the convention. Despite this, the Michigan Supreme Court ruled that the primary could go ahead as scheduled. The DNC Rules and Bylaws Committee later met on May 31, 2008, and agreed to seat all of Michigan's delegates with each delegate receiving half of a vote. As a result of this compromise, Michigan had 78 votes at the convention. On August 24, the delegates had full voting rights restored.

== Pre-primary events and polling ==
The Michigan Legislature passed a bill to move the date of the state's presidential primaries to January 15 in an effort to increase the state's influence in the presidential candidate nominating process. They argued that the Iowa Caucuses and the New Hampshire Primary unfairly dominated the selection process. Just as in Florida, the move-up bill originated in a Republican-controlled State Senate and passed by a 21–17 straight party-line vote with every Democrat casting a "no" vote.

However, Democratic National Committeewoman Debbie Dingell was a leader in moving Michigan's primary date to January 15. She later explained that she believed Michigan's rebellion against the DNC rules would spark a national campaign to change the primary process so that Iowa and New Hampshire would not always be first. She also claimed that if Michigan had conformed to DNC rules and held its primary in February, the Democratic candidates would have virtually skipped Michigan anyway in favor of other crucial states.

Federal Democratic Party rules prohibit any state, except for Iowa, New Hampshire, Nevada and South Carolina from holding its primary before February 5, or Super Tuesday. On December 1, 2007, the Democratic National Committee stripped Michigan and Florida of all of their delegates to the Democratic National Convention.

The decision of the DNC diminished the significance of the Michigan Democratic Primary. On October 9, 2007, following Michigan's breach of DNC rules, Barack Obama, Bill Richardson, Joe Biden, and John Edwards withdrew from the Michigan Democratic Primary ballot. Dennis Kucinich unsuccessfully sought to remove his name from the ballot. Hillary Clinton and Christopher Dodd decided to remain on the ballot. Although Clinton said she would honor a pledge that she and the other Democratic candidates had earlier made to refrain from campaigning or participating in Michigan, Clinton and Dodd drew sharp criticism from Biden, who stated that the two candidates had "chosen to hedge their bets" and had "abandoned Democrats in Iowa, Nevada, New Hampshire, and South Carolina" by staying on the ballot.

On December 10, 2007, the Michigan Democratic Party issued a press release stating that the primary would be held on January 15, 2008, and that the Democratic ballot would contain only six choices: Hillary Clinton, Christopher Dodd, Mike Gravel, Dennis Kucinich, Uncommitted, and Write-in. The press release also urged supporters of Biden, Edwards, Obama and Richardson to vote "uncommitted" instead of writing in their preferred candidates' names. In order for any such write-in votes to be counted, those candidates would have needed to file additional paperwork by January 4, 2008. None did so.

Chris Dodd dropped out of the race after he placed seventh in the Iowa Democratic Caucus. As of January 3, 2008, Dennis Kucinich and Mike Gravel were the only Democratic candidates who planned to campaign in the state. According to a Kucinich volunteer, the campaign changed its mind about campaigning in Michigan so that it could use the lack of activity to fill a vacuum in Kucinich's support. Gravel had already made a number of campaign stops in Michigan before January 3.

=== Polling ===
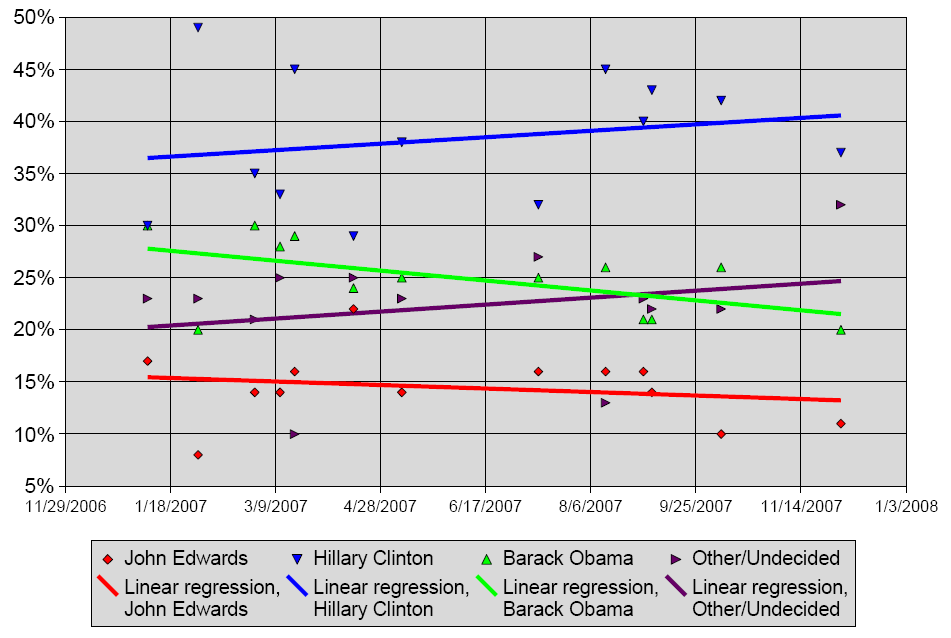
Pre-primary opinion polling statistics throughout the campaign season.

The American Research Group conducted a survey, asking 600 likely Democratic primary voters in Michigan from January 12 to January 14, 2008. The results were as follows:

| Candidate | Democratic Preference % |
|---|---|
| Hillary Clinton | 56% |
| Uncommitted | 31% |
| Undecided | 9% |
| Dennis Kucinich | 3% |
| Mike Gravel | 1% |

Hillary Clinton easily beat the "uncommitted" votes during pre-primary polls. However, the Detroit Free Press questioned whether the results of the Michigan Democratic Primary demonstrated anything. None of the major candidates in the Democratic Party campaigned at all in Michigan, and all had pledged not to participate in the primary. The Detroit Free Press was also questioning whether Clinton's polling results would have held up during the actual primary. J. Ann Selzer of Selzer & Company, director of The Detroit Free Press-Local 4 Michigan Poll, said, "In my mind, if [Clinton] does not get a majority, then more voters were against her than with her." According to the poll, if the other major contenders were to appear in the ballot, Clinton would receive 46% of the vote, Obama would receive 23%, and Edwards would get 13% while 42% of the uncommitted vote would go to Obama.

== Results ==
2008 Michigan Democratic presidential primary results
| Party | Candidate | Votes | Percentage | Statewide delegates | National delegates |
|---|---|---|---|---|---|
| Democratic | Hillary Clinton | 328,309 | 54.61% | 0 | 34.5 |
| Democratic | Barack Obama | 0 | 0.00% | 0 | 29.5 |
| Democratic | Uncommitted | 238,168 | 39.61% | 0 | 0 |
| Democratic | Dennis Kucinich | 21,715 | 3.61% | 0 | 0 |
| Democratic | Write-ins | 6,821 | 1.13% | 0 | 0 |
| Democratic | Christopher Dodd | 3,845 | 0.64% | 0 | 0 |
| Democratic | Mike Gravel | 2,361 | 0.39% | 0 | 0 |
| Totals | | 601,219 | 100.00% | 0 | 64 |
| Voter turnout | | | % | | — |

== Exit polls ==
A question in the Michigan exit poll conducted by the news media asked the respondents how they would have voted if the names of Barack Obama, John Edwards and Bill Richardson were added to the ballot. The results obtained for that question are tabulated below. The first column of the table shows that according to the exit poll, Clinton, Obama, Edwards and Richardson would have received 46%, 35%, 12% and 1% respectively with such an expanded ballot. Except for the "% Total" column, the numbers in this table should be read horizontally. For example, the row for Barack Obama tells us that of the 35% he polled in the exit poll, 18% would have come from Clinton voters, 1% from Gravel voters, 2% from Kucinich voters and 79% from uncommitted voters.

Michigan Democratic Primary Exit Poll
Question: If these had been the candidates on the ballot today, for whom would you have voted in the Democratic presidential primary?
| Candidate | % Total | Clinton | Dodd | Gravel | Kucinich | Uncommitted |
|---|---|---|---|---|---|---|
| Hillary Rodham Clinton | 46 | 97 | - | 0 | 0 | 3 |
| John Edwards | 12 | 30 | 2 | - | 11 | 57 |
| Dennis Kucinich | 2 | - | - | - | - | - |
| Barack Obama | 35 | 18 | 0 | 1 | 2 | 79 |
| Bill Richardson | 1 | - | - | - | - | - |

== Post-primary delegate allocation ==
=== Proposed revote ===
Shortly after the February 5, 2008 Super Tuesday contests, the media and some politicians, including U.S. Senator Tom Harkin (D-Iowa), suggested a revote in Florida and Michigan.

On March 7, Newsweek reported: "A plan to raise soft money to pay for a second Florida Democratic Primary—this one by mail—seems close to approval, according to Sen. Bill Nelson." A grassroots movement to raise this money began in early February with revote08.com, with which a group of South Floridians hoped to raise the money for all mail-in revotes in Michigan and Florida.

Michigan Democratic Party officials intended to restrict any revote to Democrats, and in particular to prevent those who had already voted in the Michigan Republican Primary from participating. However, since Michigan does not have party registration, it was not clear how this could have been accomplished. A date of June 3 had been suggested for the revote. However, on April 4, 2008, the Michigan Democratic Party decided it was not practical to stage a new party primary or caucus.

=== Clinton's position ===
On September 1, 2007, Hillary Clinton signed a pledge agreeing not to "campaign or participate" in Michigan. On January 25, 2008, Clinton advocated seating Michigan and Florida's delegates at the Democratic National Convention despite the DNC ban, stating:

I believe our nominee will need the enthusiastic support of Democrats in these states to win the general election, and so I will ask my Democratic convention delegates to support seating the delegations from Florida and Michigan.

In response, David Plouffe of the Obama campaign released the following statement:

When Senator Clinton was campaigning in Iowa and New Hampshire, she made it clear that states like Michigan and Florida that wouldn't produce any delegates, "don't count for anything." Now that Senator Clinton's worried about losing the first Southern primary, she's using Florida and Michigan for her own political gain by trying to assign meaning to a contest that awards zero delegates and where no campaigning has occurred.

On March 13, 2008, NPR interviewed Clinton, reporting:

Hillary Clinton says the results [in Michigan] should count, even if Barack Obama's name did not appear on the ballot. "That was his choice...There was no rule or requirement that he take his name off the ballot. His supporters ran a very aggressive campaign to try to get people to vote uncommitted."...Clinton [says] that the Michigan and Florida pledged delegates should count because both are seen as key battleground states in the general election. But if the national party does not agree, she says, the states should re-do the primaries.

When pressed by NPR, Clinton said, "We all had a choice as to whether or not to participate in what was going to be a primary, and most people took their name off the ballot but I didn't." Critics have labeled Clinton's actions as dishonest, and charged her with trying to retroactively change the rules for her own benefit.

=== DNC decision ===
In late May, attention focused on the upcoming May 31, 2008, meeting of the Rules and Bylaws Committee (RBC) of the Democratic National Committee (DNC). The RBC would choose whether to assign seats to Florida and Michigan delegates for the Democratic National Convention. (The convention itself could change the seating.) During the period before the RBC meeting, 22 uncommitted delegates pledged their support to Obama should they be seated at the convention.

On May 31, 2008, the RBC voted 19-8 to seat all of Michigan's delegates with each receiving half a vote. The resolution allocated 69 pledged delegates for Hillary Clinton and 59 pledged delegates for Barack Obama, resulting in these pledged delegate votes:

- Clinton: 34.5
- Obama: 29.5

The decision was a modification of the Michigan Leadership Plan, a proposal by the Michigan Democratic Party submitted as a compromise between the positions of the Clinton Campaign (allocating delegates based on the January 15 primary, with 73 pledged delegates for Clinton, and 55 pledged delegates as uncommitted) and the Obama Campaign (allocating the delegates evenly between Clinton and Obama, which with a full delegation would result in 64 pledged delegates for Clinton and 64 pledged delegates for Obama).

== Endorsements ==
Despite the debacle surrounding the Michigan Democratic Primary, Hillary Clinton picked up two big endorsements in the state from Governor Jennifer Granholm and U.S. Senator Debbie Stabenow.

== See also ==
- 2008 Michigan Republican presidential primary
- 2008 Florida Democratic presidential primary
- 2008 Democratic Party presidential primaries
