= Angela Brennan (politician) =

American politician

Member of the New Hampshire House of Representatives from the Merrimack 9th district
- Incumbent
- Assumed office December 7, 2022

Personal details
- Party: Democratic

Angela Brennan is an American politician. She serves as a Democratic member for the Merrimack 9th district of the New Hampshire House of Representatives.
