= 2024 New Hampshire House of Representatives election =

- November 5, 2024

All 400 seats in the New Hampshire House of Representatives 201 seats needed for a majority
	Majority party	Minority party
Leader	Sherman Packard	Matthew Wilhelm
Party	Republican	Democratic
Leader's seat	Rockingham 16	Hillsborough 42
Last election	201	199
Seats after	222	178
Seat change	▲21	▼21
Popular vote	1,351,685	1,218,506
Percentage	52.33%	47.17%
- Results: Republican gain Democratic gain Republican hold Democratic hold
Speaker before election
Sherman Packard
Republican
Elected Speaker
Sherman Packard
Republican

The 2024 New Hampshire House of Representatives election was held on November 5, 2024, alongside other state and federal elections, including the 2024 United States presidential election and the 2024 United States House of Representatives elections.

Republicans picked up 21 seats, expanding their narrow one-seat majority.

New Hampshire elects many of its state legislators using first-past-the-post voting but uses 2-seat to 11-seat districts to elect other state legislators. Plurality block voting is used in the multi-seat districts.

== Background ==
Four special elections coincided with the presidential primary.

== Predictions ==
Source	Ranking	As of
CNalysis	Tilt D (flip)	September 20, 2024
Sabato's Crystal Ball	Tossup	October 23, 2024

== Retirements ==
Eighty-one incumbents did not seek re-election.

=== Democrats ===
- Belknap 5: David Huot retired.
- Cheshire 6: Michael Abbott retired.
- Cheshire 10: Bruce Tatro retired.
- Cheshire 15: Renee Monteil retired.
- Cheshire 15: Amanda Toll retired.
- Cheshire 16: Joe Schapiro retired.
- Grafton 7: Tommy Hoyt retired.
- Grafton 9: Corinne Morse retired to run for Grafton County Treasurer.
- Grafton 12: James Murphy retired.
- Hillsborough 5: Shelley Devine retired.
- Hillsborough 6: Sherry Dutzy retired.
- Hillsborough 9: Allison Nutting-Wong retired.
- Hillsborough 9: Michael Pedersen retired.
- Hillsborough 10: Michael O'Brien retired.
- Hillsborough 11: Latha Mangipudi retired.
- Hillsborough 19: Jane Beaulieu retired.
- Hillsborough 19: Heidi Hamer retired.
- Hillsborough 20: Candace Gibbons retired.
- Hillsborough 21: Jeffrey Goley retired.
- Hillsborough 25: Amanda Bouldin retired.
- Hillsborough 26: Mary Freitas retired.
- Hillsborough 34: Jennifer Morton retired.
- Hillsborough 35: Ben Ming retired to run for State Senate.
- Hillsborough 41: Amy Bradley retired.
- Hillsborough 41: Jacqueline Chretien retired.
- Hillsborough 41: Mary Heath retired.
- Merrimack 9: Angela Brennan retired to run for State Senate.
- Merrimack 9: Mel Myler retired.
- Merrimack 15: Steve Shurtleff retired to run for Merrimack County Commission.
- Merrimack 30: Rebecca McWilliams retired to run for State Senate.
- Rockingham 10: Charlotte DiLorenzo retired.
- Rockingham 26: Joan Hamblet retired.
- Rockingham 28: Rebecca McBeath retired.
- Rockingham 29: Candice O'Neil retired.
- Strafford 10: Cam Kenney retired.
- Strafford 12: Gerri Cannon retired.
- Strafford 12: Jeffrey Rich retired.
- Strafford 12: Kenneth Vincent retired.
- Strafford 15: Bill Conlin retired.
- Strafford 16: Gail Pare retired.
- Strafford 21: Susan Treleaven retired.

=== Republicans ===
- Belknap 2: Lisa Smart retired.
- Belknap 4: Travis O'Hara retired.
- Belknap 8: Nikki McCarter retired.
- Carroll 8: Mark McConkey retired to run for State Senate.
- Cheshire 18: Matthew Santonastaso retired.
- Grafton 1: David Rochefort retired to run for State Senate.
- Grafton 1: Matthew Simon retired.
- Grafton 5: Matthew Coulon retired.
- Grafton 10: Carroll Brown Jr. retired.
- Hillsborough 1: Kimberly Abare retired.
- Hillsborough 2: Laurie Sanborn retired.
- Hillsborough 12: Tim McGough retired to run for State Senate.
- Hillsborough 13: Stephen Kennedy retired.
- Hillsborough 13: Andrew Renzullo retired.
- Hillsborough 27: Karen Reid retired.
- Hillsborough 28: Leah Cushman retired.
- Hillsborough 29: Fred Plett retired.
- Hillsborough 36: John Lewicke retired.
- Hillsborough 38: Alicia Lekas retired.
- Hillsborough 38: Tony Lekas retired.
- Hillsborough 43: Bill King retired.
- Merrimack 3: James Mason retired.
- Merrimack 3: Dave Testerman retired.
- Merrimack 7: Daniel Wolf retired.
- Merrimack 25: Jason Gerhard retired to run for Merrimack County Sheriff.
- Merrimack 27: J.R. Hoell retired to run for Merrimack County Register of Probate.
- Rockingham 1: Jacob Brouillard retired.
- Rockingham 3: Oliver Ford retired.
- Rockingham 7: Emily Phillips retired to run for State Senate.
- Rockingham 9: Tony Piemonte retired.
- Rockingham 9: Chris True retired.
- Rockingham 14: Deb Hobson retired.
- Rockingham 18: Arlene Quaratiello retired.
- Rockingham 29: Tracy Emerick retired.
- Strafford 1: James Horgan retired.
- Strafford 1: Joseph Pitre retired to run for Strafford County Commission.
- Strafford 6: Clifford Newton retired to run for Strafford County Commission.
- Strafford 19: James Connor retired.
- Sullivan 6: Walter Stapleton retired.

=== Independents ===
- Hillsborough 43: Maria Perez retired.

== Vacancies ==
Eleven seats were left vacant on the day of the general election due to resignations and deaths in 2024. An additional vacancy would be created after the election when Representative-elect Dawn Evans moved out of her district prior to inauguration day.

=== Democrats ===
- Grafton 12: Sharon Nordgren died February 10.
- Hillsborough 40: Damond Ford resigned August 30.
- Merrimack 28: Art Ellison died March 25 of heart and lung issues.
- Strafford 12: Cecilia Rich resigned August 28.

=== Republicans ===
- Cheshire 11: Zachary Nutting resigned September 11.
- Grafton 6: Jeffrey Greeson resigned July 1 after being charged with assaulting a snowplow driver.
- Hillsborough 12: Robert Healey resigned July 17.
- Hillsborough 39: Ross Berry resigned May 15 after moving out of his district.
- Rockingham 30: Tina Harley resigned May 1 after moving out of her district.

=== Independents ===
- Cheshire 7: Shaun Filiault resigned July 31 after moving out-of-state.
- Hillsborough 2: Dan Hynes resigned February 9 after moving out of his district.

== Incumbents defeated ==
=== In primary election ===
Eight incumbent representatives, all Republicans, were defeated in the September 10 primary election.

==== Republicans ====
- Belknap 6: Richard Beaudoin lost renomination to Glen Aldrich, Harry Bean, Russell Dumais, and David Nagel.
- Carroll 8: Michael Costable lost renomination to Richard Brown and Brian R. Taylor.
- Rockingham 4: Tim Cahill and Kevin Pratt lost renomination to Cindy Bennett, Mike Drago, and Brian Nadeau.
- Rockingham 7: Josh Yokela lost renomination to Laurence Miner.
- Rockingham 30: Jason Janvrin lost renomination to Aboul Khan and Matt Sabourin.
- Rockingham 32: Scott Wallace lost renomination to Melissa Litchfield.
- Strafford 3: David Bickford lost renomination to Susan DeRoy.

== Results summary ==
=== Election ===
2024 New Hampshire House of Representatives election General election — November 5, 2024
Party	Votes	Percentage	Seats	+/–
Republican	1,351,685	52.33	222	▲21
Democratic	1,218,506	47.17	178	▼21
Independents	10,187	0.39	0	
Write-in	2,646	0.10	0	
Totals	2,583,024	100	400	—

=== By district ===
District		Incumbent	Party	District		Elected representative	Party
Belknap	1	Tom Ploszaj	Rep	Belknap	1	Tom Ploszaj	Rep
Belknap	2	Matthew Coker	Rep	Belknap	2	Matthew Coker	Rep
Belknap	2	Lisa Smart	Rep	Belknap	2	Matthew Lunney	Rep
Belknap	3	Juliet Harvey-Bolia	Rep	Belknap	3	Juliet Harvey-Bolia	Rep
Belknap	4	Travis O'Hara	Rep	Belknap	4	Travis Toner	Rep
Belknap	5	Mike Bordes	Rep	Belknap	5	Mike Bordes	Rep
Belknap	5	Steven Bogert	Rep	Belknap	5	Sheri Minor	Rep
Belknap	5	David Huot	Dem	Belknap	5	Steven Bogert	Rep
Belknap	5	Charlie St. Clair	Dem	Belknap	5	Charlie St. Clair	Dem
Belknap	6	Harry Bean	Rep	Belknap	6	Harry Bean	Rep
Belknap	6	Richard Beaudoin	Rep	Belknap	6	Russell Dumais	Rep
Belknap	6	Russell Dumais	Rep	Belknap	6	David Nagel	Rep
Belknap	6	David Nagel	Rep	Belknap	6	Glen Aldrich	Rep
Belknap	7	Barbara Comtois	Rep	Belknap	7	Peter Varney	Rep
Belknap	7	Peter Varney	Rep	Belknap	7	Paul Terry	Rep
Belknap	7	Paul Terry	Rep	Belknap	7	Barbara Comtois	Rep
Belknap	8	Nikki McCarter	Rep	Belknap	8	Douglas Trottier	Rep
Belknap	8	Douglas Trottier	Rep	Belknap	8	Lisa Freeman	Rep
Carroll	1	Thomas Buco	Dem	Carroll	1	Stephen Woodcock	Dem
Carroll	1	David Paige	Dem	Carroll	1	David Paige	Dem
Carroll	1	Stephen Woodcock	Dem	Carroll	1	Thomas Buco	Dem
Carroll	2	Anita Burroughs	Dem	Carroll	2	Anita Burroughs	Dem
Carroll	2	Chris McAleer	Dem	Carroll	2	Chris McAleer	Dem
Carroll	3	Richard Brown	Rep	Carroll	3	Karel Crawford	Rep
Carroll	3	Karel Crawford	Rep	Carroll	3	Joseph Hamblen	Rep
Carroll	4	Lino Avellani	Rep	Carroll	4	Lino Avellani	Rep
Carroll	4	Mike Belcher	Rep	Carroll	4	Mike Belcher	Rep
Carroll	5	Jonathan Smith	Rep	Carroll	5	Jonathan Smith	Rep
Carroll	6	John MacDonald	Rep	Carroll	6	Katy Peternel	Rep
Carroll	6	Katy Peternel	Rep	Carroll	6	John MacDonald	Rep
Carroll	7	Glenn Cordelli	Rep	Carroll	7	Glenn Cordelli	Rep
Carroll	8	Mark McConkey	Rep	Carroll	8	Richard Brown	Rep
Carroll	8	Michael Costable	Rep	Carroll	8	Brian R. Taylor	Rep
Cheshire	1	Nicholas Germana	Dem	Cheshire	1	Dylan Germana	Dem
Cheshire	2	Dru Fox	Dem	Cheshire	2	Dru Fox	Dem
Cheshire	3	Philip Jones	Dem	Cheshire	3	Philip Jones	Dem
Cheshire	4	Jodi Newell	Dem	Cheshire	4	Jodi Newell	Dem
Cheshire	5	Lucy Weber	Dem	Cheshire	5	Lucy Weber	Dem
Cheshire	6	Michael Abbott	Dem	Cheshire	6	Paul Berch	Dem
Cheshire	6	Cathryn Harvey	Dem	Cheshire	6	Cathryn Harvey	Dem
Cheshire	7	Shaun Filiault	Dem	Cheshire	7	Terri O'Rorke	Dem
Cheshire	8	Lucius Parshal	Dem	Cheshire	8	Lucius Parshall	Dem
Cheshire	9	Dan Eaton	Dem	Cheshire	9	Rich Nalevanko	Rep
Cheshire	10	Barrett Faulkner	Dem	Cheshire	10	Barrett Faulkner	Dem
Cheshire	10	Bruce Tatro	Dem	Cheshire	10	Sly Karasinski	Rep
Cheshire	11	Zachary Nutting	Rep	Cheshire	11	Denis Murphy	Rep
Cheshire	12	Dick Thackston	Rep	Cheshire	12	Dick Thackston	Rep
Cheshire	13	Richard Ames	Dem	Cheshire	13	Richard Ames	Dem
Cheshire	14	John B. Hunt	Rep	Cheshire	14	John B. Hunt	Rep
Cheshire	15	Renee Monteil	Dem	Cheshire	15	Samantha Jacobs	Dem
Cheshire	15	Amanda Toll	Dem	Cheshire	15	Nicholas Germana	Dem
Cheshire	16	Joe Schapiro	Dem	Cheshire	16	James Gruber	Dem
Cheshire	17	Jennifer Rhodes	Rep	Cheshire	17	Jennifer Rhodes	Rep
Cheshire	18	Jim Qualey	Rep	Cheshire	18	Jim Qualey	Rep
Cheshire	18	Matthew Santonastaso	Rep	Cheshire	18	Rita Mattson	Rep
Coös	1	Troy Merner	Rep	Coos	1	Sean Durkin	Rep
Coös	1	James Tierney Jr.	Rep	Coos	1	James Tierney Jr.	Rep
Coös	2	Arnold Davis	Rep	Coos	2	Arnold Davis	Rep
Coös	3	Mike Ouellet	Rep	Coos	3	Mike Ouellet	Rep
Coös	4	Seth King	Rep	Coos	4	Seth King	Rep
Coös	5	Corinne Cascadden	Dem	Coos	5	Brian Valerino	Rep
Coös	5	Henry King	Dem	Coos	5	Pete Morency	Rep
Coös	6	William Hatch	Dem	Coos	6	Michael Murphy	Rep
Coös	7	Eamon Kelley	Dem	Coos	7	Lori Korzen	Rep
Grafton	1	Linda Massimilla	Dem	Grafton	1	Joseph Barton	Rep
Grafton	1	David Rochefort	Rep	Grafton	1	Darrell Louis	Rep
Grafton	1	Matthew Simon	Rep	Grafton	1	Calvin Beaulier	Rep
Grafton	2	Jared Sullivan	Dem	Grafton	2	Jared Sullivan	Dem
Grafton	3	Jerry Stringham	Dem	Grafton	3	Jerry Stringham	Dem
Grafton	4	Heather Baldwin	Dem	Grafton	4	Heather Baldwin	Dem
Grafton	5	Rick Ladd	Rep	Grafton	5	Rick Ladd	Rep
Grafton	5	Matthew Coulon	Rep	Grafton	5	Marie Louise Bjelobrk	Rep
Grafton	6	Jeffrey Greeson	Rep	Grafton	6	Linda Franz	Rep
Grafton	7	Tommy Hoyt	Dem	Grafton	7	Janet Lucas	Dem
Grafton	8	Bill Bolton	Dem	Grafton	8	Sallie Fellows	Dem
Grafton	8	Sallie Fellows	Dem	Grafton	8	Peter Lovett	Dem
Grafton	8	Peter Lovett	Dem	Grafton	8	Bill Bolton	Dem
Grafton	9	Corinne Morse	Dem	Grafton	9	Thomas Oppel	Dem
Grafton	10	Caroll Brown Jr.	Rep	Grafton	10	John Sellers	Rep
Grafton	11	Lex Berezhny	Rep	Grafton	11	Lex Berezhny	Rep
Grafton	12	Mary Hakken-Phillips	Dem	Grafton	12	Mary Hakken-Phillips	Dem
Grafton	12	Russell Muirhead	Dem	Grafton	12	Russell Muirhead	Dem
Grafton	12	James M. Murphy	Dem	Grafton	12	Ellen Rockmore	Dem
Grafton	12	Sharon Nordgren	Dem	Grafton	12	Terry Spahr	Dem
Grafton	13	Laurel Stavis	Dem	Grafton	13	Laurel Stavis	Dem
Grafton	14	George Sykes	Dem	Grafton	14	George Sykes	Dem
Grafton	15	Thomas H. Cormen	Dem	Grafton	15	Thomas H. Cormen	Dem
Grafton	16	Joshua Adjutant	Dem	Grafton	16	David Fracht	Dem
Grafton	17	Susan Almy	Dem	Grafton	17	Susan Almy	Dem
Grafton	18	John Sellers	Rep	Grafton	18	Donald McFarlane	Rep
Hillsborough	1	Kimberly Abare	Rep	Hillsborough	1	Jeffrey Tenczar	Rep
Hillsborough	1	Tom Mannion	Rep	Hillsborough	1	Sandra Panek	Rep
Hillsborough	1	Sandra Panek	Rep	Hillsborough	1	Tom Mannion	Rep
Hillsborough	1	Jeffrey Tenczar	Rep	Hillsborough	1	Tim Mannion	Rep
Hillsborough	2	Loren Foxx	Dem	Hillsborough	2	Catherine Rombeau	Dem
Hillsborough	2	Ted Gorski	Rep	Hillsborough	2	Brian Labrie	Rep
Hillsborough	2	Linda Gould	Rep	Hillsborough	2	Kristin Noble	Rep
Hillsborough	2	Dan Hynes	Rep	Hillsborough	2	Ted Gorski	Rep
Hillsborough	2	Kristin Noble	Rep	Hillsborough	2	John Schneller	Rep
Hillsborough	2	Catherine Rombeau	Dem	Hillsborough	2	Loren Foxx	Dem
Hillsborough	2	Laurie Sanborn	Rep	Hillsborough	2	Linda Gould	Rep
Hillsborough	3	David Cote	Dem	Hillsborough	3	Paige Beauchemin	Dem
Hillsborough	3	Stacie-Marie Laughton	Dem	Hillsborough	3	Fred Davis Jr.	Dem
Hillsborough	3	Fred Davis Jr.	Dem	Hillsborough	3	Marc Plamondon	Dem
Hillsborough	4	Ray Newman	Dem	Hillsborough	4	Sue Newman	Dem
Hillsborough	4	Sue Newman	Dem	Hillsborough	4	Linda Ryan	Dem
Hillsborough	4	Linda Ryan	Dem	Hillsborough	4	Ray Newman	Dem
Hillsborough	5	Shelley Devine	Dem	Hillsborough	5	Heather Raymond	Dem
Hillsborough	5	Susan Elberger	Dem	Hillsborough	5	Susan Elberger	Dem
Hillsborough	5	Heather Raymond	Dem	Hillsborough	5	Dale Swanson	Dem
Hillsborough	6	Sherry Dutzy	Dem	Hillsborough	6	Lee Ann Kluger	Dem
Hillsborough	6	Suzanne Vail	Dem	Hillsborough	6	Carry Spier	Dem
Hillsborough	6	Carry Spier	Dem	Hillsborough	6	Suzanne Vail	Dem
Hillsborough	7	Alicia Gregg	Dem	Hillsborough	7	Alicia Gregg	Dem
Hillsborough	7	Louis Juris	Dem	Hillsborough	7	Louis Juris	Dem
Hillsborough	7	Catherine Sofikitis	Dem	Hillsborough	7	Catherine Sofikitis	Dem
Hillsborough	8	Efstathia Booras	Dem	Hillsborough	8	Kevin Scully	Rep
Hillsborough	8	Christal Lloyd	Dem	Hillsborough	8	Christal Lloyd	Dem
Hillsborough	8	Fran Nutter-Upham	Dem	Hillsborough	8	Efstathia Booras	Dem
Hillsborough	9	William Dolan	Dem	Hillsborough	9	William Dolan	Dem
Hillsborough	9	Allison Nutting-Wong	Dem	Hillsborough	9	Santosh Salvi	Dem
Hillsborough	9	Michael Pedersen	Dem	Hillsborough	9	Sanjeev Manohar	Dem
Hillsborough	10	Linda Harriott-Gathright	Dem	Hillsborough	10	Linda Harriott-Gathright	Dem
Hillsborough	10	Martin Jack	Dem	Hillsborough	10	Marty Jack	Dem
Hillsborough	10	Michael O'Brien	Dem	Hillsborough	10	Bill Ohm	Rep
Hillsborough	11	Latha Mangipudi	Dem	Hillsborough	11	Manoj Chourasia	Dem
Hillsborough	11	Laura Telerski	Dem	Hillsborough	11	Will Darby	Dem
Hillsborough	11	William Darby	Dem	Hillsborough	11	Laura Telerski	Dem
Hillsborough	12	William Boyd III	Rep	Hillsborough	12	Maureen Mooney	Rep
Hillsborough	12	Robert Healey	Rep	Hillsborough	12	Julie Miles	Rep
Hillsborough	12	Tim McGough	Rep	Hillsborough	12	Jeanine Notter	Rep
Hillsborough	12	Maureen Mooney	Rep	Hillsborough	12	Adam Presa	Rep
Hillsborough	12	Nancy Murphy	Dem	Hillsborough	12	Nancy Murphy	Dem
Hillsborough	12	Jeanine Notter	Rep	Hillsborough	12	William Boyd III	Rep
Hillsborough	12	Rosemarie Rung	Dem	Hillsborough	12	Rosemarie Rung	Dem
Hillsborough	12	Wendy Thomas	Dem	Hillsborough	12	Wendy Thomas	Dem
Hillsborough	13	Stephen Kennedy	Rep	Hillsborough	13	Cathy Kenny	Rep
Hillsborough	13	Cathy Kenny	Rep	Hillsborough	13	Dillon Dumont	Rep
Hillsborough	13	Andrew Prout	Rep	Hillsborough	13	Andrew Prout	Rep
Hillsborough	13	Andrew Renzullo	Rep	Hillsborough	13	Jordan Ulery	Rep
Hillsborough	13	Jordan Ulery	Rep	Hillsborough	13	Robert Wherry	Rep
Hillsborough	13	Robert Wherry	Rep	Hillsborough	13	Jeremy Slottje	Rep
Hillsborough	14	Ralph Boehm	Rep	Hillsborough	14	Richard Lascelles	Rep
Hillsborough	14	Richard Lascelles	Rep	Hillsborough	14	Raymond Peeples	Rep
Hillsborough	15	Mark McLean	Rep	Hillsborough	15	Mark McLean	Rep
Hillsborough	15	Mark Proulx	Rep	Hillsborough	15	Mark Proulx	Rep
Hillsborough	16	Larry Gagne	Rep	Hillsborough	16	Larry Gagne	Rep
Hillsborough	16	William Infantine	Rep	Hillsborough	16	Dan Bergeron	Dem
Hillsborough	17	Linda DiSilvestro	Dem	Hillsborough	17	Linda DiSilvestro	Dem
Hillsborough	17	David Preece	Dem	Hillsborough	17	David Preece	Dem
Hillsborough	18	Jessica Grill	Dem	Hillsborough	18	Jessica Grill	Dem
Hillsborough	18	Juliet Smith	Dem	Hillsborough	18	Steven Kesselring	Rep
Hillsborough	19	Jane Beaulieu	Dem	Hillsborough	19	Matt Drew	Rep
Hillsborough	19	Heidi Hamer	Dem	Hillsborough	19	Suzanne Chretien	Dem
Hillsborough	20	Candace Moulton	Dem	Hillsborough	20	Alissandra Murray	Dem
Hillsborough	20	Alissandra Murray	Dem	Hillsborough	20	Pierre Dupont	Rep
Hillsborough	21	Jeffrey Goley	Dem	Hillsborough	21	Christine Seibert	Dem
Hillsborough	21	Christine Seibert	Dem	Hillsborough	21	Matthew Wilhelm	Dem
Hillsborough	22	Patricia Cornell	Dem	Hillsborough	22	Patricia Cornell	Dem
Hillsborough	22	Nicole Leapley	Dem	Hillsborough	22	Nicole Leapley	Dem
Hillsborough	23	Jean Jeudy	Dem	Hillsborough	23	Mary Ngwanda Georges	Dem
Hillsborough	23	Patrick Long	Dem	Hillsborough	23	Jean Jeudy	Dem
Hillsborough	24	Donald Bouchard	Dem	Hillsborough	24	Christopher Herbert	Dem
Hillsborough	24	Christopher Herbert	Dem	Hillsborough	24	Donald Bouchard	Dem
Hillsborough	25	Amanda Bouldin	Dem	Hillsborough	25	Kathleen Paquette	Rep
Hillsborough	25	Kathy Staub	Dem	Hillsborough	25	Kathy Staub	Dem
Hillsborough	26	Brian Cole	Rep	Hillsborough	26	Brian Cole	Rep
Hillsborough	26	Mary Freitas	Dem	Hillsborough	26	Patrick Long	Dem
Hillsborough	27	Karen Reid	Rep	Hillsborough	27	Mary Murphy	Rep
Hillsborough	28	Leah Cushman	Rep	Hillsborough	28	Keith Erf	Rep
Hillsborough	28	Keith Erf	Rep	Hillsborough	28	Travis Corcoran	Rep
Hillsborough	29	Joe Alexander	Rep	Hillsborough	29	Joe Alexander	Rep
Hillsborough	29	Judi Lanza	Dem	Hillsborough	29	Sherri Reinfurt	Rep
Hillsborough	29	Fred Plett	Rep	Hillsborough	29	Sheila Seidel	Rep
Hillsborough	29	Sheila Seidel	Rep	Hillsborough	29	Henry Giasson	Rep
Hillsborough	30	Riche Colcombe	Rep	Hillsborough	30	Jim Creighton	Rep
Hillsborough	30	Jim Creighton	Rep	Hillsborough	30	Riché Colcombe	Rep
Hillsborough	30	Jim Fedolfi	Rep	Hillsborough	30	Jim Fedolfi	Rep
Hillsborough	31	Molly Howard	Dem	Hillsborough	31	Molly Howard	Dem
Hillsborough	32	Diane Kelley	Rep	Hillsborough	32	Diane Kelley	Rep
Hillsborough	32	Jim Kofalt	Rep	Hillsborough	32	Jim Kofalt	Rep
Hillsborough	32	Shane Sirois	Rep	Hillsborough	32	Shane Sirois	Rep
Hillsborough	33	Peter Leishman	Dem	Hillsborough	33	Peter Leishman	Dem
Hillsborough	33	Jonah Wheeler	Dem	Hillsborough	33	Jonah Wheeler	Dem
Hillsborough	34	Daniel Veilleux	Dem	Hillsborough	34	Stephanie Grund	Dem
Hillsborough	34	Daniel LeClerc	Dem	Hillsborough	34	Daniel LeClerc	Dem
Hillsborough	34	Jennifer Morton	Dem	Hillsborough	34	Daniel Veilleux	Dem
Hillsborough	35	Kat McGhee	Dem	Hillsborough	35	Liz Barbour	Rep
Hillsborough	35	Ben Ming	Dem	Hillsborough	35	Kat McGhee	Dem
Hillsborough	36	John Lewicke	Rep	Hillsborough	36	Diane Pauer	Rep
Hillsborough	36	Diane Pauer	Rep	Hillsborough	36	John Suiter	Rep
Hillsborough	37	Megan Murray	Dem	Hillsborough	37	Megan Murray	Dem
Hillsborough	38	Alicia Lekas	Rep	Hillsborough	38	Kimberly Rice	Rep
Hillsborough	38	Tony Lekas	Rep	Hillsborough	38	Ralph Boehm	Rep
Hillsborough	39	Benjamin Baroody	Dem	Hillsborough	39	Mark Warden	Rep
Hillsborough	39	Ross Berry	Rep	Hillsborough	39	Jonathan Morton	Rep
Hillsborough	40	Matthew Wilhelm	Dem	Hillsborough	40	Erin Kerwin	Dem
Hillsborough	40	Damond Ford	Dem	Hillsborough	40	Mark MacKenzie	Dem
Hillsborough	40	Mark MacKenzie	Dem	Hillsborough	40	Trinidad Tellez	Dem
Hillsborough	40	Trinidad Tellez	Dem	Hillsborough	40	Suraj Budathoki	Dem
Hillsborough	41	Amy Bradley	Dem	Hillsborough	41	Tim Hartnett	Dem
Hillsborough	41	Jacqueline Chretien	Dem	Hillsborough	41	Karen Hegner	Dem
Hillsborough	41	Mary Heath	Dem	Hillsborough	41	Lily Foss	Dem
Hillsborough	42	Keith Ammon	Rep	Hillsborough	42	Keith Ammon	Rep
Hillsborough	42	Gerald Griffin	Rep	Hillsborough	42	Lisa Post	Rep
Hillsborough	42	Lisa Post	Rep	Hillsborough	42	Gerald Griffin	Rep
Hillsborough	43	Bill King	Rep	Hillsborough	43	Peter Petrigno	Dem
Hillsborough	43	Maria Perez	Dem	Hillsborough	43	Vanessa Sheehan	Rep
Hillsborough	43	Peter Petrigno	Dem	Hillsborough	43	Gary Daniels	Rep
Hillsborough	43	Vanessa Sheehan	Rep	Hillsborough	43	Paul Dargie	Dem
Hillsborough	44	Travis Corcoran	Rep	Hillsborough	44	Lisa Mazur	Rep
Hillsborough	44	Lisa Mazur	Rep	Hillsborough	44	Ross Berry	Rep
Hillsborough	45	Karen Calabro	Dem	Hillsborough	45	Jack Flanagan	Rep
Merrimack	1	Lorrie Carey	Dem	Merrimack	1	Ricky Devoid	Rep
Merrimack	2	Joyce Fulweiler	Rep	Merrimack	2	Gregory Hill	Rep
Merrimack	3	James Mason	Rep	Merrimack	3	Bryan Morse	Rep
Merrimack	3	Dave Testerman	Rep	Merrimack	3	Ernesto Gonzalez	Rep
Merrimack	4	Jose Cambrils	Rep	Merrimack	4	Jose Cambrils	Rep
Merrimack	4	Michael Moffett	Rep	Merrimack	4	Michael Moffett	Rep
Merrimack	5	Louise Andrus	Rep	Merrimack	5	Louise Andrus	Rep
Merrimack	5	Deborah Aylward	Rep	Merrimack	5	Deborah Aylward	Rep
Merrimack	6	Tom Schamberg	Dem	Merrimack	6	Tom Schamberg	Dem
Merrimack	7	Karen Ebel	Dem	Merrimack	7	Karen Ebel	Dem
Merrimack	7	Dan Wolf	Rep	Merrimack	7	Gregory Sargent	Dem
Merrimack	8	Tony Caplan	Dem	Merrimack	8	Tony Caplan	Dem
Merrimack	8	Sherry Gould	Rep	Merrimack	8	Eileen Kelly	Dem
Merrimack	8	Stephanie Payeur	Rep	Merrimack	8	Stephanie Payeur	Dem
Merrimack	9	Muriel Hall	Dem	Merrimack	9	Eleana Colby	Dem
Merrimack	9	David Luneau	Dem	Merrimack	9	Muriel Hall	Dem
Merrimack	9	Mel Myler	Dem	Merrimack	9	David Luneau	Dem
Merrimack	9	Angela Brennan	Dem	Merrimack	9	James Newsom	Dem
Merrimack	10	Stephen Boyd	Rep	Merrimack	10	Thomas Walsh	Rep
Merrimack	10	John Leavitt	Rep	Merrimack	10	John Leavitt	Rep
Merrimack	10	Yury Polozov	Rep	Merrimack	10	Stephen Boyd	Rep
Merrimack	10	Thomas Walsh	Rep	Merrimack	10	Yury Polozov	Rep
Merrimack	11	Alisson Turcotte	Dem	Merrimack	11	Matthew Pitaro	Rep
Merrimack	12	Dianne Schuett	Dem	Merrimack	12	Peter Mehegan	Rep
Merrimack	12	Brian Seaworth	Rep	Merrimack	12	Brian Seaworth	Rep
Merrimack	13	Cyril Aures	Rep	Merrimack	13	Clayton Wood	Rep
Merrimack	13	Clayton Wood	Rep	Merrimack	13	Cyril Aures	Rep
Merrimack	14	Dan McGuire	Rep	Merrimack	14	Dan McGuire	Rep
Merrimack	15	Stephen Shurtleff	Dem	Merrimack	15	Tracy Bricchi	Dem
Merrimack	16	Connie Lane	Dem	Merrimack	16	Connie Lane	Dem
Merrimack	17	Beth Richards	Dem	Merrimack	17	Beth Richards	Dem
Merrimack	18	James MacKay	Dem	Merrimack	18	James MacKay	Dem
Merrimack	19	Mary Jane Wallner	Dem	Merrimack	19	Mary Jane Wallner	Dem
Merrimack	20	Eric Gallager	Dem	Merrimack	20	Eric Gallager	Dem
Merrimack	21	Timothy Soucy	Dem	Merrimack	21	Timothy Soucy	Dem
Merrimack	22	James Roesener	Dem	Merrimack	22	James Leon Roesener	Dem
Merrimack	23	Merryl Gibbs	Dem	Merrimack	23	Merryl Gibbs	Dem
Merrimack	24	Matthew Hicks	Dem	Merrimack	24	Matthew Hicks	Dem
Merrimack	25	Jason Gerhard	Rep	Merrimack	25	James Thibualt	Rep
Merrimack	26	Alvin See	Rep	Merrimack	26	Alvin See	Rep
Merrimack	27	J.R. Hoell	Rep	Merrimack	27	Carol McGuire	Rep
Merrimack	27	Carol McGuire	Rep	Merrimack	27	Ray Plante	Rep
Merrimack	28	Art Ellison	Dem	Merrimack	28	Jim Snodgrass	Dem
Merrimack	29	Kris Schultz	Dem	Merrimack	29	Kris Schultz	Dem
Merrimack	30	Rebecca McWilliams	Dem	Merrimack	30	Gary Woods	Dem
Rockingham	1	Benjamin Bartlett	Rep	Rockingham	1	Scott Bryer	Rep
Rockingham	1	Jacob Brouillard	Rep	Rockingham	1	James Guzofski	Rep
Rockingham	1	Paul Tudor	Rep	Rockingham	1	Paul Tudor	Rep
Rockingham	2	Jason Osborne	Rep	Rockingham	2	Jason Osborne	Rep
Rockingham	2	James Spillane	Rep	Rockingham	2	James Spillane	Rep
Rockingham	2	Kevin Verville	Rep	Rockingham	2	Kevin Verville	Rep
Rockingham	3	Mary Ford	Rep	Rockingham	3	Oliver Ford	Rep
Rockingham	4	Kevin Pratt	Rep	Rockingham	4	Mike Drago	Rep
Rockingham	4	Tim Cahill	Rep	Rockingham	4	Brian Nadeau	Rep
Rockingham	4	Mike Drago	Rep	Rockingham	4	Cindy Bennett	Rep
Rockingham	5	Mark Vallone	Dem	Rockingham	5	Mark Vallone	Dem
Rockingham	5	Michael Vose	Rep	Rockingham	5	Michael Vose	Rep
Rockingham	6	Eric Turer	Dem	Rockingham	6	Eric Turer	Dem
Rockingham	7	Emily Phillips	Rep	Rockingham	7	Laurence Miner	Rep
Rockingham	8	Scott Wallace	Rep	Rockingham	8	Sayra DeVito	Rep
Rockingham	9	Tony Piemonte	Rep	Rockingham	9	Donald Selby	Rep
Rockingham	9	Chris True	Rep	Rockingham	9	Vicki Wilson	Rep
Rockingham	10	Michael Cahill	Dem	Rockingham	10	Michael Cahill	Dem
Rockingham	10	Charlotte DiLorenzo	Dem	Rockingham	10	Ellen Read	Dem
Rockingham	10	Ellen Read	Dem	Rockingham	10	Toni Weinstein	Dem
Rockingham	11	Julie Gilman	Dem	Rockingham	11	Julie Gilman	Dem
Rockingham	11	Gaby Grossman	Dem	Rockingham	11	Mark Paige	Dem
Rockingham	11	Mark Paige	Dem	Rockingham	11	Gaby Grossman	Dem
Rockingham	11	Linda Haskins	Dem	Rockingham	11	Linda Haskins	Dem
Rockingham	12	Allison Knab	Dem	Rockingham	12	Allison Knab	Dem
Rockingham	12	Zoe Manos	Dem	Rockingham	12	Zoe Manos	Dem
Rockingham	13	Charles Foote	Rep	Rockingham	13	David Love	Rep
Rockingham	13	Phyllis Katsakiores	Rep	Rockingham	13	Jodi Nelson	Rep
Rockingham	13	Erica Layon	Rep	Rockingham	13	Erica Layon	Rep
Rockingham	13	David Love	Rep	Rockingham	13	Phyllis Katsakiores	Rep
Rockingham	13	David Milz	Rep	Rockingham	13	Charles Foote	Rep
Rockingham	13	Jodi Nelson	Rep	Rockingham	13	John Potucek	Rep
Rockingham	13	Stephen Pearson	Rep	Rockingham	13	Katherine Prudhomme O'Brien	Rep
Rockingham	13	John Potucek	Rep	Rockingham	13	Stephen Pearson	Rep
Rockingham	13	Katherine Prudhomme O'Brien	Rep	Rockingham	13	David Milz	Rep
Rockingham	13	Richard Tripp	Rep	Rockingham	13	Richard Tripp	Rep
Rockingham	14	Deborah Hobson	Rep	Rockingham	14	Kenneth Weyler	Rep
Rockingham	14	Kenneth Weyler	Rep	Rockingham	14	Pam Brown	Rep
Rockingham	15	Joseph Guthrie	Rep	Rockingham	15	Joseph Guthrie	Rep
Rockingham	15	Lilli Walsh	Rep	Rockingham	15	Lilli Walsh	Rep
Rockingham	16	Tom Dolan	Rep	Rockingham	16	Kristine Perez	Rep
Rockingham	16	Ron Dunn	Rep	Rockingham	16	David Lundgren	Rep
Rockingham	16	David Lundgren	Rep	Rockingham	16	Tom Dolan	Rep
Rockingham	16	Wayne MacDonald	Rep	Rockingham	16	Ron Dunn	Rep
Rockingham	16	Sherman Packard	Rep	Rockingham	16	Douglas Thomas	Rep
Rockingham	16	Kristine Perez	Rep	Rockingham	16	Sherman Packard	Rep
Rockingham	16	Douglas Thomas	Rep	Rockingham	16	Wayne MacDonald	Rep
Rockingham	17	Katelyn Kuttab	Rep	Rockingham	17	Charles McMahon	Rep
Rockingham	17	Bob Lynn	Rep	Rockingham	17	Katelyn Kuttab	Rep
Rockingham	17	Charles McMahon	Rep	Rockingham	17	Daniel Popovici-Muller	Rep
Rockingham	17	Daniel Popovici-Muller	Rep	Rockingham	17	Robert Lynn	Rep
Rockingham	18	Debra DeSimone	Rep	Rockingham	18	Debra DeSimone	Rep
Rockingham	18	Arlene Quaratiello	Rep	Rockingham	18	Jay Markell	Rep
Rockingham	19	Susan Porcelli	Rep	Rockingham	19	Susan Porcelli	Rep
Rockingham	20	Robert Harb	Rep	Rockingham	20	Robert Harb	Rep
Rockingham	20	Charles Melvin	Rep	Rockingham	20	Charles Melvin	Rep
Rockingham	20	James Summers	Rep	Rockingham	20	James Summers	Rep
Rockingham	21	Robin Vogt	Dem	Rockingham	21	Jennifer Mandelbaum	Dem
Rockingham	22	Kate Murray	Dem	Rockingham	22	Kate Murray	Dem
Rockingham	23	Jim Maggiore	Dem	Rockingham	23	Jim Maggiore	Dem
Rockingham	24	Jaci Grote	Dem	Rockingham	24	Jaci Grote	Dem
Rockingham	24	Dennis Malloy	Dem	Rockingham	24	Dennis Malloy	Dem
Rockingham	25	Fred Doucette	Rep	Rockingham	25	Joseph Sweeney	Rep
Rockingham	25	John Janigian	Rep	Rockingham	25	Fred Doucette	Rep
Rockingham	25	Joseph Sweeney	Rep	Rockingham	25	Lorie Ball	Rep
Rockingham	25	John Sytek	Rep	Rockingham	25	Tanya Donnelly	Rep
Rockingham	25	Susan Vandecasteele	Rep	Rockingham	25	John Janigian	Rep
Rockingham	25	Lorie Ball	Rep	Rockingham	25	John Sytek	Rep
Rockingham	25	Tanya Donnelly	Rep	Rockingham	25	Valerie McDonnell	Rep
Rockingham	25	Dennis Mannion	Rep	Rockingham	25	Susan Vandecasteele	Rep
Rockingham	25	Valerie McDonnell	Rep	Rockingham	25	Dennis Mannion	Rep
Rockingham	26	Joan Hamblet	Dem	Rockingham	26	Buzz Scherr	Dem
Rockingham	27	Gerry Ward	Dem	Rockingham	27	Gerry Ward	Dem
Rockingham	28	Rebecca McBeath	Dem	Rockingham	28	Carrie Sorensen	Dem
Rockingham	29	Michael Edgar	Dem	Rockingham	29	Chris Muns	Dem
Rockingham	29	Tracy Emerick	Rep	Rockingham	29	Nicholas Bridle	Rep
Rockingham	29	Chris Muns	Dem	Rockingham	29	Mike Edgar	Dem
Rockingham	29	Candice O'Neil	Dem	Rockingham	29	Erica de Vries	Dem
Rockingham	30	Tina Harley	Rep	Rockingham	30	Aboul Khan	Rep
Rockingham	30	Aboul Khan	Rep	Rockingham	30	Matt Sabourin	Rep
Rockingham	31	Jess Edwards	Rep	Rockingham	31	Jess Edwards	Rep
Rockingham	31	Terry Roy	Rep	Rockingham	31	Terry Roy	Rep
Rockingham	32	Josh Yokela	Rep	Rockingham	32	Melissa Litchfield	Rep
Rockingham	33	Alexis Simpson	Dem	Rockingham	33	Alexis Simpson	Dem
Rockingham	34	Mark Pearson	Rep	Rockingham	34	Mark Pearson	Rep
Rockingham	35	Julius Soti	Rep	Rockingham	35	Julius Soti	Rep
Rockingham	36	JD Bernardy	Rep	Rockingham	36	JD Bernardy	Rep
Rockingham	37	David Meuse	Dem	Rockingham	37	David Meuse	Dem
Rockingham	38	Peggy Balboni	Dem	Rockingham	38	Peggy Balboni	Dem
Rockingham	39	Ned Raynolds	Dem	Rockingham	39	Ned Raynolds	Dem
Rockingham	40	Jason Janvrin	Rep	Rockingham	40	Linda McGrath	Rep
Strafford	1	James Horgan	Rep	Strafford	1	Susan DeLemus	Rep
Strafford	1	Joseph Pitre	Rep	Strafford	1	Robley Hall	Rep
Strafford	2	Glenn Bailey	Rep	Strafford	2	Glenn Bailey	Rep
Strafford	2	Claudine Burnham	Rep	Strafford	2	Michael Granger	Rep
Strafford	2	Michael Granger	Rep	Strafford	2	Claudine Burnham	Rep
Strafford	3	David Bickford	Rep	Strafford	3	Susan DeRoy	Rep
Strafford	3	Cassandra Levesque	Dem	Strafford	4	Len Turcotte	Dem
Strafford	3	Heath Howard	Dem	Strafford	4	Cassandra Levesque	Dem
Strafford	3	Len Turcotte	Rep	Strafford	4	Heath Howard	Rep
Strafford	5	Thomas Kaczynski Jr.	Rep	Strafford	5	Thomas Kaczynski Jr.	Rep
Strafford	6	Clifford Newton	Rep	Strafford	6	Denise DeDe-Poulin	Rep
Strafford	7	Aidan Ankarberg	Rep	Strafford	7	Aidan Ankarberg	Rep
Strafford	8	Chuck Grassie	Dem	Strafford	8	Samuel Farrington	Dem
Strafford	9	Brandon Phinney	Rep	Strafford	9	Amy Malone	Rep
Strafford	10	Timothy Horrigan	Dem	Strafford	10	Marjorie Smith	Dem
Strafford	10	Cam Kenney	Dem	Strafford	10	Loren Selig	Dem
Strafford	10	Marjorie Smith	Dem	Strafford	10	Timothy Horrigan	Dem
Strafford	10	Loren Selig	Dem	Strafford	10	Wayne Burton	Dem
Strafford	11	Thomas Southworth	Dem	Strafford	11	Janet Wall	Dem
Strafford	11	Janet Wall	Dem	Strafford	11	Erik Johnson	Dem
Strafford	11	Hoy Menear	Dem	Strafford	11	Thomas Southworth	Dem
Strafford	12	Gerri Cannon	Dem	Strafford	12	Dawn Evans	Dem
Strafford	12	Cecilia Rich	Dem	Strafford	12	Myles England	Dem
Strafford	12	Jeffrey Rich	Dem	Strafford	12	John Stone	Dem
Strafford	12	Kenneth Vincent	Dem	Strafford	12	Wayne Pearson	Dem
Strafford	13	Peter Bixby	Dem	Strafford	13	Peter Bixby	Dem
Strafford	14	Peter B. Schmidt	Dem	Strafford	14	Peter B. Schmidt	Dem
Strafford	15	Bill Conlin	Dem	Strafford	15	Alice Wade	Dem
Strafford	16	Gail Pare	Dem	Strafford	16	Gary Gilmore	Dem
Strafford	17	Jessica LaMontagne	Dem	Strafford	17	Jessica LaMontagne	Dem
Strafford	18	Michael Harrington	Rep	Strafford	18	Michael Harrington	Rep
Strafford	19	James Connor	Rep	Strafford	19	David Walker	Rep
Strafford	19	Daniel Fitzpatrick	Dem	Strafford	19	John Larochelle	Dem
Strafford	19	Kelley Potenza	Rep	Strafford	19	Kelley Potenza	Rep
Strafford	20	Allan Howland	Dem	Strafford	20	Allan Howland	Dem
Strafford	21	Susan Treleaven	Dem	Strafford	21	Luz Bay	Dem
Strafford	21	Luz Bay	Dem	Strafford	21	Seth Miller	Dem
Strafford	21	Geoffrey Smith	Dem	Strafford	21	Geoffrey Smith	Dem
Sullivan	1	Brian Sullivan	Dem	Sullivan	1	Brian Sullivan	Dem
Sullivan	2	William Palmer	Dem	Sullivan	2	William Palmer	Dem
Sullivan	3	Skip Rollins	Rep	Sullivan	3	Skip Rollins	Rep
Sullivan	3	Steven D. Smith	Rep	Sullivan	3	Steven D. Smith	Rep
Sullivan	3	Walter Spilsbury	Rep	Sullivan	3	Walter Spilsbury	Rep
Sullivan	4	Judy Aron	Rep	Sullivan	4	Judy Aron	Rep
Sullivan	5	Linda Tanner	Dem	Sullivan	5	George Grant	Rep
Sullivan	6	John Cloutier	Dem	Sullivan	6	Dale Girard	Dem
Sullivan	6	Gary Merchant	Dem	Sullivan	6	John Cloutier	Dem
Sullivan	6	Walter Stapleton	Rep	Sullivan	6	Wayne Hemingway	Rep
Sullivan	7	Margaret Drye	Rep	Sullivan	7	Margaret Drye	Rep
Sullivan	8	Hope Damon	Dem	Sullivan	8	Hope Damon	Dem
Sullivan	8	Jonathan Stone	Rep	Sullivan	8	Michael Aron	Rep

== Detailed results ==
=== Belknap County ===
==== 1st District ====
Belknap’s 1st District Democratic primary details

Democratic Primary, Belknap’s 1st District (1 seat)
Party	Candidate	Votes	%
Democratic	David Rose	Unopposed	
Total votes		330	100.0

Belknap’s 1st District Republican primary details

Republican Primary, Belknap’s 1st District (1 seat)
Party	Candidate	Votes	%
Republican	Tom Ploszaj (Incumbent)	Unopposed	
Total votes		424	100.0

==== 2nd District ====
Belknap’s 2nd District Democratic primary details

Democratic Primary, Belknap’s 2nd District (2 seats)
Party	Candidate	Votes	%
Democratic	Lynn Thomas	534	57.48
Democratic	Ben Brookmyer	395	42.52
Total votes		929	100.00

Belknap’s 2nd District Republican primary details

Republican Primary, Belknap’s 2nd District (2 seats)
Party	Candidate	Votes	%
Republican	Matthew Coker (Incumbent)	749	53.39
Republican	Matthew Lunney (Incumbent)	345	24.59
Republican	Edward S. Twaddell III	309	22.02
Total votes		1,403	100.00

==== 3rd District ====
Belknap’s 3rd District Democratic primary details

Democratic Primary, Belknap’s 3rd District (1 seat)
Party	Candidate	Votes	%
Democratic	Andrew R. Sanborn	Unopposed	
Total votes		544	100.0

Belknap’s 3rd District Republican primary details

Republican Primary, Belknap’s 3rd District (1 seat)
Party	Candidate	Votes	%
Republican	Juliet Harvey-Bolia (Incumbent)	Unopposed	
Total votes		732	100.0

==== 4th District ====
No candidates filed to contest the Democratic Party primary election in Belknap’s 4th District.

Belknap’s 4th District Republican primary details

Republican Primary, Belknap’s 4th District (1 seat)
Party	Candidate	Votes	%
Republican	Travis Toner (Incumbent)	592	77.59
Write-In	Travis O’Hara	171	22.41
Total votes		763	100.00

==== 5th District ====
Belknap’s 5th District Democratic primary details

Democratic Primary, Belknap’s 5th District (4 seats)
Party	Candidate	Votes	%
Democratic	Charlie St. Clair (Incumbent)	901	32.55
Democratic	Wendy Chase	783	28.29
Democratic	Erika Gray	748	27.02
Write-in	Jon Hildreth	336	12.14
Total votes		2,768	100.00

Belknap’s 5th District Republican primary details

Republican Primary, Belknap’s 5th District (4 seats)
Party	Candidate	Votes	%
Republican	Mike Bordes (Incumbent)	1,066	23.81
Republican	Steven Bogert (Incumbent)	966	21.58
Republican	Richard Littlefield	872	19.48
Republican	Sheri Minor (Incumbent)	849	18.96
Republican	Dawn M. Johnson	724	16.17
Total votes		4,477	100.00

==== 6th District ====
Belknap’s 6th District Democratic primary details

Democratic Primary, Belknap’s 6th District (4 seats)
Party	Candidate	Votes	%
Democratic	Bob McLean	923	25.56
Democratic	Lena Nirk	923	25.56
Democratic	Kurt Webber	906	25.09
Democratic	Jonathan D. Arsenault	859	24.26
Total votes		3,611	100.00

Belknap’s 6th District Republican primary details

Republican Primary, Belknap’s 6th District (4 seats)
Party	Candidate	Votes	%
Republican	Harry Bean (Incumbent)	1,592	26.25
Republican	Russell Dumais (Incumbent)	1,212	19.99
Republican	David Nagel (Incumbent)	1,032	17.01
Republican	Glen Aldrich (Incumbent)	887	14.63
Republican	Ronnie Abbott	716	11.81
Republican	Richard B. Beaudoin	625	10.31
Total votes		6,064	100.00

==== 7th District ====
Belknap’s 7th District Democratic primary details

Democratic Primary, Belknap’s 7th District (3 seats)
Party	Candidate	Votes	%
Democratic	Ruth Larson	640	54.15
Democratic	Susan Church Stevens	418	35.36
Write-in	Stephanie Vuolo	109	9.22
Write-in	Alan Glassman	15	1.27
Total votes		1,182	100.00

Belknap’s 7th District Republican primary details

Republican Primary, Belknap’s 7th District (3 seats)
Party	Candidate	Votes	%
Republican	Paul Terry (Incumbent)	1,100	29.72
Republican	Peter Varney (Incumbent)	1,089	29.42
Republican	Barbara Comtois (Incumbent)	1,009	27.26
Republican	Brianna Weller	503	13.60
Total votes		3,701	100.00

==== 8th District ====
Belknap’s 8th District Democratic primary details

Democratic Primary, Belknap’s 8th District (2 seats)
Party	Candidate	Votes	%
Democratic	Sheryl Anderson	760	55.47
Democratic	Don House	610	44.53
Total votes		1,370	100.00

Belknap’s 8th District Republican primary details

Republican Primary, Belknap’s 8th District (2 seats)
Party	Candidate	Votes	%
Republican	Douglas Trottier (Incumbent)	1,239	53.43
Republican	Lisa Freeman (Incumbent)	1,080	46.57
Total votes		2,319	100.00

=== Carroll County ===
==== 1st District ====
Carroll’s 1st District Democratic primary details

Democratic Primary, Carroll’s 1st District (3 seats)
Party	Candidate	Votes	%
Democratic	Stephen Woodcock (Incumbent)	734	35.51
Democratic	David Paige (Incumbent)	674	32.61
Democratic	Thomas Buco (Incumbent)	659	31.88
Total votes		2,067	100.00

Carroll’s 1st District Republican primary details

Republican Primary, Carroll’s 1st District (3 seats)
Party	Candidate	Votes	%
Republican	Karen C. Umberger	Unopposed	
Total votes		685	100.0

==== 2nd District ====
Carroll’s 2nd District Democratic primary details

Democratic Primary, Carroll’s 2nd District (2 seats)
Party	Candidate	Votes	%
Democratic	Anita Borroughs (Incumbent)	1,080	57.57
Democratic	Chris McAleer (Incumbent)	796	42.43
Total votes		1,876	100.00

Carroll’s 2nd District Republican primary details

No candidates filed to contest the Republican Party primary election in Carroll’s 2nd District.

==== 3rd District ====
Carroll’s 3rd District Democratic primary details

Democratic Primary, Carroll’s 3rd District (2 seats)
Party	Candidate	Votes	%
Democratic	Sandra Ringelstein	1,004	51.28
Democratic	Kim Johnson	954	48.72
Total votes		1,958	100.00

Carroll’s 3rd District Republican primary details

Republican Primary, Carroll’s 3rd District (2 seats)
Party	Candidate	Votes	%
Republican	Karel Crawford (Incumbent)	1,134	51.95
Republican	Joseph Hamblen	1,049	48.05
Total votes		2,183	100.00

==== 4th District ====
Carroll’s 4th District Democratic primary details

Democratic Primary, Carroll’s 4th District (2 seats)
Party	Candidate	Votes	%
Democratic	Donna V. Ackerman	Unopposed	
Total votes		636	100.0

Carroll’s 4th District Republican primary details

Republican Primary, Carroll’s 4th District (1 seat)
Party	Candidate	Votes	%
Republican	Lino Avellani (Incumbent)	1,023	53.53
Republican	Mike Belcher (Incumbent)	888	46.47
Total votes		1,911	100.00

==== 5th District ====
No candidates filed to contest the Democratic Party primary election in Carroll’s 5th District.

Carroll’s 5th District Republican primary details

Republican Primary, Carroll’s 5th District (1 seat)
Party	Candidate	Votes	%
Republican	Jonathan Smith (Incumbent)	Unopposed	
Total votes		425	100.0

==== 6th District ====
Carroll’s 6th District Democratic primary details

Democratic Primary, Carroll’s 6th District (2 seats)
Party	Candidate	Votes	%
Democratic	Karen Burnett-Kurie	915	74.51
Write-in	Kayla Hewitt	313	25.49
Total votes		1,228	100.00

Carroll’s 6th District Republican primary details

Republican Primary, Carroll’s 6th District (2 seats)
Party	Candidate	Votes	%
Republican	Katy Peternel (Incumbent)	1,136	51.66
Republican	John MacDonald (Incumbent)	1,063	48.34
Total votes		2,199	100.00

==== 7th District ====
Carroll’s 7th District Democratic primary details

Democratic Primary, Carroll’s 7th District (1 seat)
Party	Candidate	Votes	%
Democratic	Bobbi Boudman	870	70.10
Democratic	Beverly Wood	371	29.90
Total votes		1,241	100.00

Carroll’s 7th District Republican primary details

Republican Primary, Carroll’s 5th District (1 seat)
Party	Candidate	Votes	%
Republican	Glenn Cordelli (Incumbent)	Unopposed	
Total votes		1,620	100.0

==== 8th District ====
Carroll’s 8th District Democratic primary details

Democratic Primary, Carroll’s 8th District (2 seats)
Party	Candidate	Votes	%
Democratic	James Pittman	1,454	50.43
Democratic	Rob Davies	1,429	49.57
Total votes		2,883	100.00

Carroll’s 8th District Republican primary details

Republican Primary, Carroll’s 8th District (2 seats)
Party	Candidate	Votes	%
Republican	Richard R. Brown	1,760	43.30
Republican	Brian R. Taylor	1,179	29.00
Republican	Michael Costable (Incumbent)	1,126	27.70
Total votes		4,065	100.00

=== Cheshire County ===
==== 1st District ====
Cheshire’s 1st District Democratic primary details

Democratic Primary, Cheshire’s 1st District (1 seat)
Party	Candidate	Votes	%
Democratic	Dylan Germana	Unopposed	
Total votes		305	100.0

No candidates filed to contest the Republican Party primary election in Cheshire’s 1st District.

==== 2nd District ====
Cheshire’s 2nd District Democratic primary details

Democratic Primary, Cheshire’s 2nd District (1 seat)
Party	Candidate	Votes	%
Democratic	Dru Fox (Incumbent)	Unopposed	
Total votes		503	100.0

Cheshire’s 2nd District Republican primary details

Republican Primary, Cheshire’s 2nd District (1 seat)
Party	Candidate	Votes	%
Republican	Nathan Carbone	Unopposed	
Total votes		150	100.0

==== 3rd District ====
Cheshire’s 3rd District Democratic primary details

Democratic Primary, Cheshire’s 3rd District (1 seat)
Party	Candidate	Votes	%
Democratic	Philip Jones (Incumbent)	Unopposed	
Total votes		555	100.0

No candidates filed to contest the Republican Party primary election in Cheshire’s 3rd District.

==== 4th District ====
Cheshire’s 4th District Democratic primary details

Democratic Primary, Cheshire’s 4th District (1 seat)
Party	Candidate	Votes	%
Democratic	Jodi Newell (Incumbent)	Unopposed	
Total votes		516	100.0

Cheshire’s 4th District Republican primary details

Republican Primary, Cheshire’s 4th District (1 seat)
Party	Candidate	Votes	%
Republican	Thomas Savastano	Unopposed	
Total votes		181	100.0

==== 5th District ====
Cheshire’s 5th District Democratic primary details

Democratic Primary, Cheshire’s 5th District (1 seat)
Party	Candidate	Votes	%
Democratic	Lucy Weber (Incumbent)	Unopposed	
Total votes		614	100.0

Cheshire’s 5th District Republican primary details

Republican Primary, Cheshire’s 5th District (1 seat)
Party	Candidate	Votes	%
Republican	William J. Sommer	Unopposed	
Total votes		312	100.0

==== 6th District ====
Cheshire’s 6th District Democratic primary details

Democratic Primary, Cheshire’s 6th District (2 seats)
Party	Candidate	Votes	%
Democratic	Cathryn Harvey (Incumbent)	751	50.98
Democratic	Paul Berch	722	49.02
Total votes		1,473	100.00

Cheshire’s 6th District Republican primary details

Republican Primary, Cheshire’s 6th District (2 seats)
Party	Candidate	Votes	%
Republican	Sean Graves	Unopposed	
Total votes		543	100.0

==== 7th District ====
No candidates filed to contest the Republican Party primary election in Cheshire’s 7th District.

Cheshire’s 7th District Democratic primary details

Democratic Primary, Cheshire’s 7th District (1 seat)
Party	Candidate	Votes	%
Democratic	Terri O’Rorke	Unopposed	
Total votes		518	100.0

==== 8th District ====
Cheshire’s 8th District Democratic primary details

Democratic Primary, Cheshire’s 8th District (1 seat)
Party	Candidate	Votes	%
Democratic	Lucius Parshal (Incumbent)	Unopposed	
Total votes		737	100.0

No candidates filed to contest the Republican Party primary election in Cheshire’s 8th District.

==== 9th District ====
Cheshire’s 9th District Democratic primary details

Democratic Primary, Cheshire’s 9th District (1 seat)
Party	Candidate	Votes	%
Democratic	Dan Eaton (Incumbent)	Unopposed	
Total votes		516	100.0

Cheshire’s 9th District Republican primary details

Republican Primary, Cheshire’s 9th District (1 seat)
Party	Candidate	Votes	%
Republican	Rich Nalevanko	Unopposed	
Total votes		463	100.0

==== 10th District ====
Cheshire’s 10th District Democratic primary details

Democratic Primary, Cheshire’s 10th District (2 seats)
Party	Candidate	Votes	%
Democratic	Barrett Faulkner (Incumbent)	546	57.90
Democratic	Alan Gross	397	42.10
Total votes		943	100.00

Cheshire’s 10th District Republican primary details

Republican Primary, Cheshire’s 10th District (2 seats)
Party	Candidate	Votes	%
Republican	Sly Karasinski (Incumbent)	551	52.33
Republican	Daniel LeClair	502	47.67
Total votes		1,053	100.00

==== 11th District ====
Cheshire’s 11th District Democratic primary details

Democratic Primary, Cheshire’s 11th District (1 seat)
Party	Candidate	Votes	%
Democratic	Natalie Quevedo	Unopposed	
Total votes		241	100.0

Cheshire’s 11th District Republican primary details

Republican Primary, Cheshire’s 11th District (1 seats)
Party	Candidate	Votes	%
Republican	Zachary Nutting (Incumbent)	Unopposed	
Total votes		234	100.0

==== 12th District ====
Cheshire’s 12th District Democratic primary details

Democratic Primary, Cheshire’s 12th District (1 seat)
Party	Candidate	Votes	%
Democratic	Jack Gettens	Unopposed	
Total votes		285	100.0

Cheshire’s 12th District Republican primary details

Republican Primary, Cheshire’s 12th District (1 seats)
Party	Candidate	Votes	%
Republican	Dick Thackston (Incumbent)	Unopposed	
Total votes		326	100.0

==== 13th District ====
Cheshire’s 13th District Democratic primary details

Democratic Primary, Cheshire’s 13th District (1 seat)
Party	Candidate	Votes	%
Democratic	Richard Ames (Incumbent)	Unopposed	
Total votes		782	100.0

Cheshire’s 13th District Republican primary details

Republican Primary, Cheshire’s 13th District (1 seat)
Party	Candidate	Votes	%
Republican	Donald R. Primrose	Unopposed	
Total votes		555	100.0

==== 14th District ====
Cheshire’s 14th District Democratic primary details

Democratic Primary, Cheshire’s 14th District (1 seat)
Party	Candidate	Votes	%
Democratic	Deni Dickler	Unopposed	
Total votes		391	100.0

Cheshire’s 14th District Republican primary details

Republican Primary, Cheshire’s 14th District (1 seats)
Party	Candidate	Votes	%
Republican	John B. Hunt (Incumbent)	Unopposed	
Total votes		648	100.0

==== 15th District ====
Cheshire’s 15th District Democratic primary details

Democratic Primary, Cheshire’s 15th District (2 seats)
Party	Candidate	Votes	%
Democratic	Samantha Jacobs	2,800	51.27
Democratic	Nicholas Germana	2,661	48.73
Total votes		5,461	100.00

Cheshire’s 15th District Republican primary details

Republican Primary, Cheshire’s 15th District (2 seats)
Party	Candidate	Votes	%
Republican	John W. Winter	1,150	52.06
Republican	Jerry L. Sickels	1,059	47.94
Total votes		2,209	100.00

==== 16th District ====
Cheshire’s 16th District Democratic primary details

Democratic Primary, Cheshire’s 16th District (1 seat)
Party	Candidate	Votes	%
Democratic	James Gruber	Unopposed	
Total votes		1,707	100.0

No candidates filed to contest the Republican Party primary election in Cheshire’s 16th District.

==== 17th District ====
Cheshire’s 17th District Democratic primary details

Democratic Primary, Cheshire’s 17th District (1 seat)
Party	Candidate	Votes	%
Democratic	Kristan Tilton	Unopposed	
Total votes		1,103	100.0

Cheshire’s 17th District Republican primary details

Republican Primary, Cheshire’s 17th District (1 seat)
Party	Candidate	Votes	%
Republican	Jennifer Rhodes (Incumbent)	Unopposed	
Total votes		1,277	100.0

==== 18th District ====
Cheshire’s 18th District Democratic primary details

Democratic Primary, Cheshire’s 18th District (2 seats)
Party	Candidate	Votes	%
Democratic	Hannah Bissex	894	42.67
Democratic	Tom Hsu	667	31.84
Democratic	Jed Brummer	534	25.49
Total votes		2,095	100.00

Cheshire’s 18th District Republican primary details

Republican Primary, Cheshire’s 15th District (2 seats)
Party	Candidate	Votes	%
Republican	Rita Mattson	1,041	50.51
Republican	Jim Qualey (Incumbent)	1,020	49.49
Total votes		2,061	100.00

=== Coos County ===
==== 1st District ====
Coos’ 1st District Democratic primary details

Democratic Primary, Coos’ 1st District (2 seats)
Party	Candidate	Votes	%
Democratic	Cathleen A. Fountain	Unopposed	
Total votes		482	100.0

Coos’ 1st District Republican primary details

Republican Primary, Coos’ 1st District (2 seats)
Party	Candidate	Votes	%
Republican	James Tierney Jr. (Incumbent)	465	52.48
Republican	Sean Durkin	421	47.52
Total votes		886	100.00

Coos’ 1st District General Elections details

General Election, Coos’ 1st District (2 seats)
Party	Candidate	Votes	%
Republican	Sean Durkin	1,960	38.1
Republican	James Tierney Jr. (Incumbent)	1,632	31.8
Democratic	Cathleen Fountain	1,544	30.0
Total votes		5,140	100.00

==== 2nd District ====
No candidates filed to contest the Democratic Party primary election in Coos' 2nd District.

Coos’ 2nd District Republican primary details

Republican Primary, Coos’ 2nd District (1 seat)
Party	Candidate	Votes	%
Republican	Arnold Davis (Incumbent)	Unopposed	
Total votes		453	100.0

==== 3rd District ====
No candidates filed to contest the Democratic Party primary election in Coos' 3rd District.

Coos’ 3rd District Republican primary details

Republican Primary, Coos’ 3rd District (1 seat)
Party	Candidate	Votes	%
Republican	Mike Ouellet (Incumbent)	Unopposed	
Total votes		361	100.0

==== 4th District ====
Coos’ 4th District Democratic primary details

Democratic Primary, Coos’ 4th District (1 seat)
Party	Candidate	Votes	%
Write-in	Suzy Colt	Unopposed	
Total votes		101	100.0

Coos’ 4th District Republican primary details

Republican Primary, Coos’ 4th District (1 seat)
Party	Candidate	Votes	%
Republican	Sent King (Incumbent)	Unopposed	
Total votes		412	100.0

==== 5th District ====
Coos’ 5th District Democratic primary details

Democratic Primary, Coos’ 5th District (2 seats)
Party	Candidate	Votes	%
Democratic	Corinne Cascadden (Incumbent)	579	53.41
Democratic	Henry W. Noel	505	46.59
Total votes		1,084	100.00

Coos’ 5th District Republican primary details

Republican Primary, Coos’ 5th District (2 seats)
Party	Candidate	Votes	%
Republican	Brian Valerino	498	52.20
Republican	Peter Morency	456	47.80
Total votes		954	100.00

==== 6th District ====
Coos’ 6th District Democratic primary details

Democratic Primary, Coos’ 6th District (1 seat)
Party	Candidate	Votes	%
Democratic	Maggie Baker	Unopposed	
Total votes		383	100.0

Coos’ 6th District Republican primary details

Republican Primary, Coos’ 6th District (1 seat)
Party	Candidate	Votes	%
Republican	Michael Murphy	Unopposed	
Total votes		313	100.0

==== 7th District ====
Coos’ 7th District Democratic primary details

Democratic Primary, Coos’ 7th District (1 seat)
Party	Candidate	Votes	%
Democratic	Eamon Kelley (Incumbent)	Unopposed	
Total votes		967	100.0

Coos’ 7th District Republican primary details

Republican Primary, Coos’ 7th District (1 seat)
Party	Candidate	Votes	%
Republican	Lori Korzen	Unopposed	
Total votes		951	100.0

=== Grafton County ===
==== 1st District ====
Grafton’s 1st District Democratic primary details

Democratic Primary, Grafton’s 1st District (3 seats)
Party	Candidate	Votes	%
Democratic	Linda Massimilla (Incumbent)	716	38.49
Democratic	Timothy T. Egan	636	34.19
Democratic	Vern Masters	508	27.32
Total votes		1,860	100.00

Grafton’s 1st District Republican primary details

Republican Primary, Grafton’s 1st District (3 seats)
Party	Candidate	Votes	%
Republican	Darrell Louis	633	30.13
Republican	Calvin Beaulier	548	26.08
Republican	Joseph Barton	517	24.61
Republican	Samuel Mealey	403	19.18
Total votes		2,101	100.00

==== 2nd District ====
Grafton’s 2nd District Democratic primary details

Democratic Primary, Grafton’s 2nd District (1 seat)
Party	Candidate	Votes	%
Democratic	Jared Sullivan (Incumbent)	Unopposed	
Total votes		586	100.0

Grafton’s 2nd District Republican primary details

Republican Primary, Grafton’s 2nd District (1 seat)
Party	Candidate	Votes	%
Republican	Eddie Qi	Unopposed	
Total votes		266	100.0

==== 3rd District ====
Grafton’s 3rd District Democratic primary details

Democratic Primary, Grafton’s 3rd District (1 seat)
Party	Candidate	Votes	%
Democratic	Jerry Stringham (Incumbent)	Unopposed	
Total votes		340	100.0

Grafton’s 3rd District Republican primary details

Republican Primary, Grafton’s 3rd District (1 seat)
Party	Candidate	Votes	%
Republican	Paul H. Schirduan	255	61.59
Republican	Bonnie Ham	159	38.41
Total votes		414	100.00

==== 4th District ====
Grafton’s 4th District Democratic primary details

Democratic Primary, Grafton’s 4th District (1 seat)
Party	Candidate	Votes	%
Democratic	Heather Baldwin (Incumbent)	Unopposed	
Total votes		401	100.0

Grafton’s 4th District Republican primary details

Republican Primary, Grafton’s 4th District (1 seat)
Party	Candidate	Votes	%
Republican	Steven Babin	Unopposed	
Total votes		333	100.0

==== 5th District ====
Grafton’s 5th District Democratic primary details

Democratic Primary, Grafton’s 5th District (2 seats)
Party	Candidate	Votes	%
Democratic	Rachael E. Booth	350	56.27
Democratic	Dustin Vigneault	272	43.73
Total votes		622	100.00

Grafton’s 5th District Republican primary details

Republican Primary, Grafton’s 5th District (2 seats)
Party	Candidate	Votes	%
Republican	Rick Ladd (Incumbent)	454	38.90
Republican	Marie Louise Bjelobrk	411	35.22
Republican	Greg Mathieson	302	25.88
Total votes		1,167	100.00

==== 6th District ====
Grafton’s 6th District Democratic primary details

Democratic Primary, Grafton’s 6th District (1 seat)
Party	Candidate	Votes	%
Democratic	Jolene T. Farmer	Unopposed	
Total votes		383	100.0

Grafton’s 6th District Republican primary details

Republican Primary, Grafton’s 6th District (1 seat)
Party	Candidate	Votes	%
Republican	Linda Franz	Unopposed	
Total votes		410	100.0

==== 7th District ====
Grafton’s 7th District Democratic primary details

Democratic Primary, Grafton’s 6th District (1 seat)
Party	Candidate	Votes	%
Democratic	Janet Marie Lucas	Unopposed	
Total votes		345	100.0

Grafton’s 7th District Republican primary details

Republican Primary, Grafton’s 7th District (1 seat)
Party	Candidate	Votes	%
Republican	Jon Gablinske	Unopposed	
Total votes		269	100.0

==== 8th District ====
Grafton’s 8th District Democratic primary details

Democratic Primary, Grafton’s 8th District (3 seats)
Party	Candidate	Votes	%
Democratic	Peter Lovett (Incumbent)	965	33.97
Democratic	Sallie Fellows (Incumbent)	957	33.69
Democratic	Bill Bolton (Incumbent)	919	32.34
Total votes		2,841	100.00

Grafton’s 8th District Republican primary details

Republican Primary, Grafton’s 8th District (2 seats)
Party	Candidate	Votes	%
Republican	Timothy Sweetsir	Unopposed	
Total votes		609	100.0

==== 9th District ====
Grafton’s 9th District Democratic primary details

Democratic Primary, Grafton’s 9th District (1 seat)
Party	Candidate	Votes	%
Democratic	Thomas Oppel	Unopposed	
Total votes		392	100.0

Grafton’s 9th District Republican primary details

Republican Primary, Grafton’s 9th District (1 seat)
Party	Candidate	Votes	%
Republican	Kevin M. Howard	Unopposed	
Total votes		281	100.0

==== 10th District ====
Grafton’s 10th District Democratic primary details

Democratic Primary, Grafton’s 10th District (1 seat)
Party	Candidate	Votes	%
Democratic	Richard A. Lobban Jr.	Unopposed	
Total votes		392	100.0

Grafton’s 10th District Republican primary details

Republican Primary, Grafton’s 10th District (1 seat)
Party	Candidate	Votes	%
Republican	John Sellers	Unopposed	
Total votes		491	100.0

==== 11th District ====
No candidates filed to contest the Democratic Party primary election in Grafton's 11th District.

Grafton’s 11th District Republican primary details

Republican Primary, Grafton’s 11th District (1 seat)
Party	Candidate	Votes	%
Republican	Lex Berezhny (Incumbent)	Unopposed	
Total votes		505	100.0

==== 12th District ====
Grafton’s 12th District Democratic primary details

Democratic Primary, Grafton’s 12th District (4 seats)
Party	Candidate	Votes	%
Democratic	Mary Hakken-Phillips (Incumbent)	1,782	25.69
Democratic	Russell Muirhead (Incumbent)	1,778	25.63
Democratic	Ellen Rockmore	1,712	24.68
Democratic	Terry Spahr	1,664	24.00
Total votes		6,936	100.00

No candidates filed to contest the Republican Party primary election in Grafton’s 12th District.

==== 13th District ====
Grafton’s 13th District Democratic primary details

Democratic Primary, Grafton’s 13th District (1 seat)
Party	Candidate	Votes	%
Democratic	Laurel Stavis (Incumbent)	Unopposed	
Total votes		542	100.0

No candidates filed to contest the Republican Party primary election in Grafton’s 13th District.

==== 14th District ====
Grafton’s 14th District Democratic primary details

Democratic Primary, Grafton’s 14th District (1 seat)
Party	Candidate	Votes	%
Democratic	George Sykes (Incumbent)	Unopposed	
Total votes		590	100.0

No candidates filed to contest the Republican Party primary election in Grafton’s 14th District.

==== 15th District ====
Grafton’s 15th District Democratic primary details

Democratic Primary, Grafton’s 15th District (1 seat)
Party	Candidate	Votes	%
Democratic	Thomas H. Cormen (Incumbent)	Unopposed	
Total votes		529	100.0

No candidates filed to contest the Republican Party primary election in Grafton’s 15th District.

==== 16th District ====
Grafton’s 16th District Democratic primary details

Democratic Primary, Grafton’s 16th District (1 seat)
Party	Candidate	Votes	%
Democratic	David Fracht	Unopposed	
Total votes		509	100.0

No candidates filed to contest the Republican Party primary election in Grafton’s 16th District.

==== 17th District ====
Grafton’s 17th District Democratic primary details

Democratic Primary, Grafton’s 17th District (1 seat)
Party	Candidate	Votes	%
Democratic	Susan Almy (Incumbent)	Unopposed	
Total votes		1,671	100.0

No candidates filed to contest the Republican Party primary election in Grafton’s 17th District.

==== 18th District ====
Grafton’s 18th District Democratic primary details

Democratic Primary, Grafton’s 18th District (1 seat)
Party	Candidate	Votes	%
Democratic	Carolyn Fluehr-Lobban	Unopposed	
Total votes		1,523	100.0

Grafton’s 18th District Republican primary details

Republican Primary, Grafton’s 18th District (1 seat)
Party	Candidate	Votes	%
Republican	Donald McFarlane	Unopposed	
Total votes		1,509	100.0

=== Hillsborough County ===
==== 1st District ====
Hillsborough’s 1st District Democratic primary details

Democratic Primary, Hillsborough’s 1st District (4 seats)
Party	Candidate	Votes	%
Democratic	Lisa Brown	533	25.82
Democratic	Ann Balcom-Dadak	516	25.00
Democratic	Paul L. Dadak	509	24.66
Democratic	B.J. Murphy	506	24.52
Total votes		2,064	100.00

Hillsborough’s 1st District Republican primary details

Republican Primary, Hillsborough’s 1st District (4 seats)
Party	Candidate	Votes	%
Republican	Jeffrey Tenczar (Incumbent)	1,175	25.98
Republican	Sandra Panek (Incumbent)	1,150	25.40
Republican	Tom Mannion (Incumbent)	1,105	24.41
Republican	Tim Mannion	1,097	24.23
Total votes		4,527	100.00

==== 2nd District ====
Hillsborough’s 2nd District Democratic primary details

Democratic Primary, Hillsborough’s 2nd District (7 seats)
Party	Candidate	Votes	%
Democratic	Catherine Rombeau (Incumbent)	1,867	15.19
Democratic	Matthew Sullivan	1,822	14.82
Democratic	Shana Potvin	1,754	14.27
Democratic	Loren Foxx (Incumbent)	1,743	14.18
Democratic	Kevin Boyarsky	1,713	13.94
Democratic	John Fitzgerald	1,710	13.91
Democratic	Jeff Kerr	1,683	13.69
Total votes		12,292	100.00

Hillsborough’s 2nd District Republican primary details

Republican Primary, Hillsborough’s 2nd District (7 seats)
Party	Candidate	Votes	%
Republican	Brian Labrie	2,029	14.12
Republican	Kirstin Noble (Incumbent)	1,985	13.81
Republican	Ted Gorski (Incumbent)	1,983	13.80
Republican	Linda Gould (Incumbent)	1,946	13.54
Republican	John Schneller	1,744	12.13
Republican	Peter Kujawski	1,712	11.91
Republican	Danielle Evansic	1,624	11.30
Republican	Russan Chester	1,350	9.39
Total votes		14,373	100.00

==== 3rd District ====
Hillsborough’s 3rd District Democratic primary details

Democratic Primary, Hillsborough’s 3rd District (3 seats)
Party	Candidate	Votes	%
Democratic	Paige Beachemin	248	34.54
Democratic	Marc Plamondon	243	33.84
Democratic	Fred Davis Jr. (Incumbent)	227	31.62
Total votes		718	100.00

Hillsborough’s 3rd District Republican primary details

Republican Primary, Hillsborough’s 3rd District (3 seats)
Party	Candidate	Votes	%
Republican	David M. Narkunas	175	56.27
Republican	Joost J.G. Baumeister	136	43.73
Total votes		311	100.00

==== 4th District ====
Hillsborough’s 4th District Democratic primary details

Democratic Primary, Hillsborough’s 4th District (3 seats)
Party	Candidate	Votes	%
Democratic	Sue Newman (Incumbent)	675	33.90
Democratic	Linda Ryan (Incumbent)	659	33.10
Democratic	Ray Newman (Incumbent)	657	33.00
Total votes		1,991	100.00

Hillsborough’s 4th District Republican primary details

Republican Primary, Hillsborough’s 4th District (3 seats)
Party	Candidate	Votes	%
Republican	Michael McCarthy	Unopposed	
Total votes		711	100.0

==== 5th District ====
Hillsborough’s 5th District Democratic primary details

Democratic Primary, Hillsborough’s 5th District (3 seats)
Party	Candidate	Votes	%
Democratic	Susan Elberger (Incumbent)	935	31.81
Democratic	Heather Raymond (Incumbent)	918	31.24
Democratic	Dale Swanson	767	26.10
Democratic	SuzAnne-Marie Rak	319	10.85
Total votes		2,939	100.00

Hillsborough’s 5th District Republican primary details

Republican Primary, Hillsborough’s 5th District (3 seats)
Party	Candidate	Votes	%
Republican	David Allison Dyer	733	34.14
Republican	Sean Rogers	710	33.07
Republican	Joseph Capriotti	704	32.79
Total votes		2,147	100.00

==== 6th District ====
Hillsborough’s 6th District Democratic primary details

Democratic Primary, Hillsborough’s 6th District (3 seats)
Party	Candidate	Votes	%
Democratic	Lee Ann Kluger	536	33.82
Democratic	Suzanne Vail (Incumbent)	533	33.63
Democratic	Carry Spier (Incumbent)	516	32.55
Total votes		1,585	100.00

Hillsborough’s 6th District Republican primary details

Republican Primary, Hillsborough’s 6th District (3 seats)
Party	Candidate	Votes	%
Republican	Paul R. Berube	430	36.59
Republican	Daniel Richardson	383	32.60
Republican	Doris Hohensee	362	30.81
Total votes		1,175	100.00

==== 7th District ====
Hillsborough’s 7th District Democratic primary details

Democratic Primary, Hillsborough’s 7th District (3 seats)
Party	Candidate	Votes	%
Democratic	Alicia Gregg (Incumbent)	464	36.74
Democratic	Catherine Sofikitis (Incumbent)	407	32.22
Democratic	Louis Juris (Incumbent)	392	31.04
Total votes		1,263	100.00

Hillsborough’s 7th District Republican primary details

Republican Primary, Hillsborough’s 7th District (3 seats)
Party	Candidate	Votes	%
Republican	Dee Hogan	393	51.24
Republican	Avalon Lewis	374	48.76
Total votes		767	100.00

==== 8th District ====
Hillsborough’s 8th District Democratic primary details

Democratic Primary, Hillsborough’s 8th District (3 seats)
Party	Candidate	Votes	%
Democratic	Christal Lloyd (Incumbent)	399	34.43
Democratic	Efstathia Booras (Incumbent)	391	33.74
Democratic	Fran Nutter-Upham (Incumbent)	369	31.83
Total votes		1,159	100.00

Hillsborough’s 8th District Republican primary details

Republican Primary, Hillsborough’s 8th District (3 seats)
Party	Candidate	Votes	%
Republican	Kevin Scully	Unopposed	
Total votes		398	100.0

==== 9th District ====
Hillsborough’s 9th District Democratic primary details

Democratic Primary, Hillsborough’s 9th District (3 seats)
Party	Candidate	Votes	%
Democratic	William Dolan (Incumbent)	681	36.11
Democratic	Sanjeev Manohar	614	32.56
Democratic	Santosh Salvi	591	31.33
Total votes		1,886	100.00

Hillsborough’s 9th District Republican primary details

Republican Primary, Hillsborough’s 9th District (1 seat)
Party	Candidate	Votes	%
Republican	Paula Johnson	Unopposed	
Total votes		759	100.0

==== 10th District ====
Hillsborough’s 10th District Democratic primary details

Democratic Primary, Hillsborough’s 10th District (3 seats)
Party	Candidate	Votes	%
Democratic	Linda Harriott-Gathright (Incumbent)	636	35.61
Democratic	Marty Jack (Incumbent)	626	35.05
Democratic	Melbourne Moran Jr.	524	29.34
Total votes		1,786	100.00

Hillsborough’s 10th District Republican primary details

Republican Primary, Hillsborough’s 10th District (3 seats)
Party	Candidate	Votes	%
Republican	Bill Ohm	624	41.74
Republican	John Cawthron	437	29.23
Republican	Dana Albrecht	434	29.03
Total votes		1,495	100.00

==== 11th District ====
Hillsborough’s 11th District Democratic primary details

Democratic Primary, Hillsborough’s 11th District (3 seats)
Party	Candidate	Votes	%
Democratic	Laura Telerski (Incumbent)	597	36.65
Democratic	Will Darby (Incumbent)	522	32.04
Democratic	Manoj Chourasia	510	31.31
Total votes		1,629	100.00

Hillsborough’s 11th District Republican primary details

Republican Primary, Hillsborough’s 11th District (3 seats)
Party	Candidate	Votes	%
Republican	Peter Silva	462	35.51
Republican	Kristie Hart	431	33.13
Republican	Robert J. Sullivan	408	31.36
Total votes		1,301	100.00

==== 12th District ====
Hillsborough’s 12th District Democratic primary details

Democratic Primary, Hillsborough’s 12th District (8 seats)
Party	Candidate	Votes	%
Democratic	Rosemarie Rung (Incumbent)	1,760	13.66
Democratic	Nancy Murphy (Incumbent)	1,754	13.61
Democratic	Wendy Thomas (Incumbent)	1,722	13.36
Democratic	Kathryn Stack	1,573	12.20
Democratic	Rebecca Boutin	1,565	12.14
Democratic	Marc Nozell	1,537	11.92
Democratic	George R. Dieter	1,495	11.60
Democratic	James Fils	1,484	11.51
Total votes		12,890	100.00

Hillsborough’s 12th District Republican primary details

Republican Primary, Hillsborough’s 12th District (8 seats)
Party	Candidate	Votes	%
Republican	Maureen Mooney (Incumbent)	2,298	13.49
Republican	Jeanine Notter (Incumbent)	2,256	13.24
Republican	William Boyd III (Incumbent)	2,243	13.16
Republican	Julie Miles	2,179	12.79
Republican	Rebekah Woodman	2,063	12.11
Republican	John Frechette	2,028	11.90
Republican	Adam Presa	2,014	11.82
Republican	Tracy Coyer	1,959	11.50
Total votes		17,040	100.00

==== 13th District ====
Hillsborough’s 13th District Democratic primary details

Democratic Primary, Hillsborough’s 13th District (6 seats)
Party	Candidate	Votes	%
Democratic	John Knowles	1,129	25.60
Democratic	Alejandro Urrutia	1,097	24.89
Democratic	Ryan Burke	1,093	24.80
Democratic	Timothy Wyatt	1,089	24.71
Total votes		4,408	100.00

Hillsborough’s 13th District Republican primary details

Republican Primary, Hillsborough’s 13th District (6 seats)
Party	Candidate	Votes	%
Republican	Dillon Dumont	1,782	17.82
Republican	Jordan Ulery (Incumbent)	1,726	17.25
Republican	Cathy Kenny (Incumbent)	1,701	17.00
Republican	Andrew Prout (Incumbent)	1,679	16.78
Republican	Robert Wherry	1,570	15.70
Republican	Jeremy Slottje	1,545	15.45
Total votes		10,003	100.00

==== 14th District ====
Hillsborough’s 14th District Democratic primary details

Democratic Primary, Hillsborough’s 14th District (2 seats)
Party	Candidate	Votes	%
Democratic	Michael Aniskovich	427	55.38
Democratic	Mahendra Bakshi	344	44.62
Total votes		771	100.00

Hillsborough’s 14th District Republican primary details

Republican Primary, Hillsborough’s 14th District (2 seats)
Party	Candidate	Votes	%
Republican	Richard Lascelles (Incumbent)	631	34.84
Republican	Raymond Pepples Jr.	533	29.43
Republican	Kimberley M. Queenan	338	18.66
Republican	George Lambert	309	17.07
Total votes		1,811	100.00

==== 15th District ====
Hillsborough’s 15th District Democratic primary details

Democratic Primary, Hillsborough’s 15th District (2 seats)
Party	Candidate	Votes	%
Democratic	Lara Quiroga	525	54.86
Democratic	Thomas Katsiantonis	432	45.14
Total votes		957	100.00

Hillsborough’s 15th District Republican primary details

Republican Primary, Hillsborough’s 15th District (2 seats)
Party	Candidate	Votes	%
Republican	Mark Proulx (Incumbent)	748	51.37
Republican	Mark McLean (Incumbent)	708	48.63
Total votes		1,456	100.00

==== 16th District ====
Hillsborough’s 16th District Democratic primary details

Democratic Primary, Hillsborough’s 16th District (2 seats)
Party	Candidate	Votes	%
Democratic	Dan Bergeron	Unopposed	
Total votes		637	100.0

Hillsborough’s 16th District Republican primary details

Republican Primary, Hillsborough’s 16th District (2 seats)
Party	Candidate	Votes	%
Republican	William Infante (Incumbent)	736	51.58
Republican	Larry Gagne (Incumbent)	691	48.42
Total votes		1,427	100.00

==== 17th District ====
Hillsborough’s 17th District Democratic primary details

Democratic Primary, Hillsborough’s 17th District (2 seats)
Party	Candidate	Votes	%
Democratic	Linda DiSilvestro (Incumbent)	759	51.18
Democratic	David Preece (Incumbent)	724	48.82
Total votes		1,483	100.00

Hillsborough’s 17th District Republican primary details

Republican Primary, Hillsborough’s 17th District (2 seats)
Party	Candidate	Votes	%
Republican	Ben Prescott	Unopposed	
Total votes		579	100.0

==== 18th District ====
Hillsborough’s 18th District Democratic primary details

Democratic Primary, Hillsborough’s 18th District (2 seats)
Party	Candidate	Votes	%
Democratic	Jessica Grill (Incumbent)	582	54.65
Democratic	Juliet Smith (Incumbent)	483	45.35
Total votes		1,065	100.00

Hillsborough’s 18th District Republican primary details

Republican Primary, Hillsborough’s 18th District (2 seats)
Party	Candidate	Votes	%
Republican	Steven Kesselring	521	53.16
Republican	Juliet Belle Di Pietro	459	46.84
Total votes		980	100.00

==== 19th District ====
Hillsborough’s 19th District Democratic primary details

Democratic Primary, Hillsborough’s 19th District (2 seats)
Party	Candidate	Votes	%
Democratic	Suzanne L. Chretien	517	59.77
Democratic	Samuel Petali	348	40.23
Total votes		865	100.00

Hillsborough’s 19th District Republican primary details

Republican Primary, Hillsborough’s 19th District (1 seat)
Party	Candidate	Votes	%
Republican	Matt Drew	Unopposed	
Total votes		559	100.0

==== 20th District ====
Hillsborough’s 20th District Democratic primary details

Democratic Primary, Hillsborough’s 20th District (2 seats)
Party	Candidate	Votes	%
Democratic	Alissandra Murray (Incumbent)	479	54.31
Democratic	Joshua Query	403	45.69
Total votes		882	100.00

Hillsborough’s 20th District Republican primary details

Republican Primary, Hillsborough’s 20th District (2 seats)
Party	Candidate	Votes	%
Republican	Pierre Dupont	428	56.91
Republican	Jose R. Marte	324	43.09
Total votes		752	100.00

==== 21st District ====
Hillsborough’s 21st District Democratic primary details

Democratic Primary, Hillsborough’s 21st District (2 seats)
Party	Candidate	Votes	%
Democratic	Christine Seibert (Incumbent)	1,100	54.24
Democratic	Matthew B. Wilhelm	928	45.76
Total votes		2,028	100.00

Hillsborough’s 21st District Republican primary details

Republican Primary, Hillsborough’s 21st District (2 seats)
Party	Candidate	Votes	%
Republican	Andrew Fromuth	Unopposed	
Total votes		796	100.0

==== 22nd District ====
Hillsborough’s 22nd District Democratic primary details

Democratic Primary, Hillsborough’s 22nd District (2 seats)
Party	Candidate	Votes	%
Democratic	Patricia Cornell (Incumbent)	397	48.83
Democratic	Nicole Leapley (Incumbent)	342	42.07
Democratic	Matthew Ping	74	9.10
Total votes		813	100.00

Hillsborough’s 22nd District Republican primary details

Republican Primary, Hillsborough’s 22nd District (2 seats)
Party	Candidate	Votes	%
Republican	Bill Gabler	293	51.68
Republican	Karl Beisel	274	48.32
Total votes		567	100.00

==== 23rd District ====
Hillsborough’s 23rd District Democratic primary details

Democratic Primary, Hillsborough’s 23rd District (2 seats)
Party	Candidate	Votes	%
Democratic	MaryNgwanda Geroges	384	44.34
Democratic	Jean Jeudy (Incumbent)	305	35.22
Democratic	Anthony L. Harris	177	20.44
Total votes		866	100.00

Hillsborough’s 23rd District Republican primary details

Republican Primary, Hillsborough’s 23rd District (2 seats)
Party	Candidate	Votes	%
Republican	Tim Peters	Unopposed	
Total votes		226	100.0

==== 24th District ====
Hillsborough’s 24th District Democratic primary details

Democratic Primary, Hillsborough’s 24th District (2 seats)
Party	Candidate	Votes	%
Democratic	Chris Herbert (Incumbent)	448	52.15
Democratic	Donald Bouchard (Incumbent)	411	47.85
Total votes		859	100.00

Hillsborough’s 24th District Republican primary details

Republican Primary, Hillsborough’s 24th District (2 seats)
Party	Candidate	Votes	%
Republican	Dennis M. Demars	Unopposed	
Total votes		371	100.0

==== 25th District ====
Hillsborough’s 25th District Democratic primary details

Democratic Primary, Hillsborough’s 25th District (2 seats)
Party	Candidate	Votes	%
Democratic	Kathy Staub (Incumbent)	303	55.60
Democratic	Hyacinth J. Landry	242	44.40
Total votes		545	100.00

Hillsborough’s 25th District Republican primary details

Republican Primary, Hillsborough’s 25th District (2 seats)
Party	Candidate	Votes	%
Republican	Kathleen Paquette	Unopposed	
Total votes		267	100.0

==== 26th District ====
Hillsborough’s 26th District Democratic primary details

Democratic Primary, Hillsborough’s 26th District (2 seats)
Party	Candidate	Votes	%
Democratic	Patrick Long	484	59.83
Democratic	Michael Reuschel	325	40.17
Total votes		809	100.00

Hillsborough’s 26th District Republican primary details

Republican Primary, Hillsborough’s 26th District (2 seats)
Party	Candidate	Votes	%
Republican	Brian Cole (Incumbent)	Unopposed	
Total votes		494	100.0

==== 27th District ====
Hillsborough’s 27th District Democratic primary details

Democratic Primary, Hillsborough’s 27th District (1 seat)
Party	Candidate	Votes	%
Democratic	Susan Kane	Unopposed	
Total votes		384	100.0

Hillsborough’s 27th District Republican primary details

Republican Primary, Hillsborough’s 27th District (1 seat)
Party	Candidate	Votes	%
Republican	Mary Murphy	Unopposed	
Total votes		475	100.0

==== 28th District ====
Hillsborough’s 28th District Democratic primary details

Democratic Primary, Hillsborough’s 28th District (2 seats)
Party	Candidate	Votes	%
Democratic	David Erikson	543	55.24
Democratic	Luke Drake Jr.	440	44.76
Total votes		983	100.00

Hillsborough’s 28th District Republican primary details

Republican Primary, Hillsborough’s 28th District (2 seats)
Party	Candidate	Votes	%
Republican	Keith Erf (Incumbent)	966	53.43
Republican	Travis Corcoran	842	46.57
Total votes		1,808	100.00

==== 29th District ====
Hillsborough’s 29th District Democratic primary details

Democratic Primary, Hillsborough’s 29th District (4 seats)
Party	Candidate	Votes	%
Democratic	Judi Lanza (Incumbent)	1,290	25.45
Democratic	Jim Craig	1,272	25.09
Democratic	Judy Johnson	1,255	24.75
Democratic	Melanie Renfrew-Hebert	1,253	24.71
Total votes		5,070	100.00

Hillsborough’s 29th District Republican primary details

Republican Primary, Hillsborough’s 29th District (4 seats)
Party	Candidate	Votes	%
Republican	Joe Alexander (Incumbent)	1,600	24.27
Republican	Sheila Seidel (Incumbent)	1,439	21.83
Republican	Sherri Reinfurt	1,439	21.83
Republican	Henry R. Giasson III	1,301	19.74
Republican	Peter Georgantas	813	12.33
Total votes		6,592	100.00

==== 30th District ====
Hillsborough’s 30th District Democratic primary details

Democratic Primary, Hillsborough’s 30th District (3 seats)
Party	Candidate	Votes	%
Democratic	Marjorie Porter	804	40.57
Democratic	Michael H. Schamel	619	31.23
Democratic	William Bryk	559	28.20
Total votes		1,982	100.00

Hillsborough’s 30th District Republican primary details

Republican Primary, Hillsborough’s 30th District (3 seats)
Party	Candidate	Votes	%
Republican	Jim Creighton (Incumbent)	800	34.98
Republican	Riché Colcombe (Incumbent)	772	33.76
Republican	Jim Fedolfi	715	31.26
Total votes		2,287	100.00

==== 31st District ====
Hillsborough’s 31st District Democratic primary details

Democratic Primary, Hillsborough’s 31st District (1 seat)
Party	Candidate	Votes	%
Democratic	Molly Howard (Incumbent)	Unopposed	
Total votes		603	100.0

Hillsborough’s 31st District Republican primary details

Republican Primary, Hillsborough’s 31st District (1 seat)
Party	Candidate	Votes	%
Republican	Jarvis M. Adams IV	Unopposed	
Total votes		419	100.0

==== 32nd District ====
Hillsborough’s 32nd District Democratic primary details

Democratic Primary, Hillsborough’s 32nd District (3 seats)
Party	Candidate	Votes	%
Democratic	Jennifer Bernet	663	34.37
Democratic	Kermit Williams	647	33.54
Democratic	Michael H. Schamel	619	32.09
Total votes		1,929	100.00

Hillsborough’s 32nd District Republican primary details

Republican Primary, Hillsborough’s 32nd District (3 seats)
Party	Candidate	Votes	%
Republican	Shane Sirois (Incumbent)	1,040	35.36
Republican	Diane Kelley (Incumbent)	955	32.47
Republican	Jim Kofalt (Incumbent)	946	32.17
Total votes		2,941	100.00

==== 33rd District ====
Hillsborough’s 33rd District Democratic primary details

Democratic Primary, Hillsborough’s 33rd District (2 seats)
Party	Candidate	Votes	%
Democratic	Jonah Wheeler (Incumbent)	1,020	37.63
Democratic	Peter Leishman (Incumbent)	977	36.25
Democratic	Ivy Vann	706	26.12
Total votes		2,703	100.00

Hillsborough’s 33rd District Republican primary details

Republican Primary, Hillsborough’s 33rd District (2 seats)
Party	Candidate	Votes	%
Republican	Kimberley Thomas	Unopposed	
Total votes		419	100.0

==== 34th District ====
Hillsborough’s 34th District Democratic primary details

Democratic Primary, Hillsborough’s 34th District (3 seats)
Party	Candidate	Votes	%
Democratic	Stephanie Grund	1,226	35.39
Democratic	Daniel Veilleux (Incumbent)	1,144	33.03
Democratic	Daniel LeClerc (Incumbent)	1,094	31.58
Total votes		3,464	100.00

Hillsborough’s 34th District Republican primary details

Republican Primary, Hillsborough’s 34th District (3 seats)
Party	Candidate	Votes	%
Republican	Russ Hodgkins	1,126	33.02
Republican	Diane Layton	1,047	30.70
Republican	Terry Reiber	938	27.51
Republican	Rolf Vanbibber	299	8.77
Total votes		3,410	100.00

==== 35th District ====
Hillsborough’s 35th District Democratic primary details

Democratic Primary, Hillsborough’s 35th District (2 seats)
Party	Candidate	Votes	%
Democratic	Kat McGhee (Incumbent)	917	56.12
Democratic	Will Walker	717	43.88
Total votes		1,634	100.00

Hillsborough’s 35th District Republican primary details

Republican Primary, Hillsborough’s 35th District (2 seats)
Party	Candidate	Votes	%
Republican	Liz Barbour	928	44.00
Republican	Sue Homola	895	42.44
Republican	Jack Langley	286	13.56
Total votes		2,109	100.00

==== 36th District ====
Hillsborough’s 36th District Democratic primary details

Democratic Primary, Hillsborough’s 36th District (2 seats)
Party	Candidate	Votes	%
Democratic	Peter A. Cook	623	52.18
Democratic	Carol Schreck	571	47.82
Total votes		1,194	100.00

Hillsborough’s 36th District Republican primary details

Republican Primary, Hillsborough’s 36th District (2 seats)
Party	Candidate	Votes	%
Republican	Diane Pauer (Incumbent)	739	50.83
Republican	John W. Suiter	715	49.17
Total votes		1,454	100.00

==== 37th District ====
Hillsborough’s 37th District Democratic primary details

Democratic Primary, Hillsborough’s 37th District (1 seat)
Party	Candidate	Votes	%
Democratic	Megan Murray (Incumbent)	Unopposed	
Total votes		2,524	100.0

Hillsborough’s 37th District Republican primary details

Republican Primary, Hillsborough’s 37th District (1 seat)
Party	Candidate	Votes	%
Republican	Pamela D. Coughlin	Unopposed	
Total votes		2,534	100.0

==== 38th District ====
Hillsborough’s 38th District Democratic primary details

Democratic Primary, Hillsborough’s 38th District (2 seats)
Party	Candidate	Votes	%
Democratic	Luan Baci	Unopposed	
Total votes		1,714	100.0

Hillsborough’s 38th District Republican primary details

Republican Primary, Hillsborough’s 38th District (2 seats)
Party	Candidate	Votes	%
Republican	Ralph Boehm	2,024	37.87
Republican	Kimberley Rice	1,999	37.41
Republican	Mark Edgington	1,321	24.72
Total votes		5,344	100.00

==== 39th District ====
Hillsborough’s 39th District Democratic primary details

Democratic Primary, Hillsborough’s 39th District (2 seats)
Party	Candidate	Votes	%
Democratic	Maxine Mosley	1,542	53.14
Democratic	Benjamin Baroody (Incumbent)	1,360	46.86
Total votes		2,902	100.00

Hillsborough’s 39th District Republican primary details

Republican Primary, Hillsborough’s 39th District (2 seats)
Party	Candidate	Votes	%
Republican	Mark Warden	1,758	52.12
Republican	Jonathan Morton	1,615	47.88
Total votes		3,373	100.00

==== 40th District ====
Hillsborough’s 40th District Democratic primary details

Democratic Primary, Hillsborough’s 40th District (4 seats)
Party	Candidate	Votes	%
Democratic	Mark MacKenzie (Incumbent)	2,688	26.20
Democratic	Erin Kerwin	2,661	25.94
Democratic	Trinidad Tellez (Incumbent)	2,510	24.47
Democratic	Suraj Budathoki	2,399	23.39
Total votes		10,258	100.00

Hillsborough’s 40th District Republican primary details

Republican Primary, Hillsborough’s 40th District (4 seats)
Party	Candidate	Votes	%
Republican	Carlos Gonzalez	1,925	27.80
Republican	Carla Gericke	1,679	24.24
Republican	Andre Rosa	1,670	24.11
Republican	Alex Krantz	1,652	23.85
Total votes		6,926	100.00

==== 41st District ====
Hillsborough’s 41st District Democratic primary details

Democratic Primary, Hillsborough’s 41st District (3 seats)
Party	Candidate	Votes	%
Democratic	Lily M. Foss	1,574	27.77
Democratic	Tim Hartnett	1,400	24.71
Democratic	Karen Hegner	1,159	20.46
Democratic	Mary Smith	835	14.74
Democratic	Rebecca Smith	698	12.32
Total votes		5,666	100.00

Hillsborough’s 41st District Republican primary details

Republican Primary, Hillsborough’s 41st District (3 seats)
Party	Candidate	Votes	%
Republican	Ryan Hebert	1,326	38.86
Republican	Melodye LaChance Smith	1,074	31.48
Republican	Lee Xavier Davis	1,012	29.66
Total votes		3,412	100.00

==== 42nd District ====
Hillsborough’s 42nd District Democratic primary details

Democratic Primary, Hillsborough’s 42nd District (3 seats)
Party	Candidate	Votes	%
Democratic	Sarah E. Chadzynski	1,007	33.86
Democratic	Brian Paquette	986	33.15
Democratic	Andrew Stokinger	981	32.99
Total votes		2,974	100.00

Hillsborough’s 42nd District Republican primary details

Republican Primary, Hillsborough’s 42nd District (3 seats)
Party	Candidate	Votes	%
Republican	Gerald Griffin (Incumbent)	1,109	33.92
Republican	Keith Ammon (Incumbent)	1,104	33.76
Republican	Lisa Post (Incumbent)	1,057	32.32
Total votes		3,270	100.00

==== 43rd District ====
Hillsborough’s 43rd District Democratic primary details

Democratic Primary, Hillsborough’s 43rd District (4 seats)
Party	Candidate	Votes	%
Democratic	Peter Petringo (Incumbent)	1,146	27.14
Democratic	Paul Dargie	1,087	25.74
Democratic	Scott Lawrence	1,006	23.82
Democratic	Michael Varraso	984	23.30
Total votes		4,223	100.00

Hillsborough’s 43rd District Republican primary details

Republican Primary, Hillsborough’s 43rd District (4 seats)
Party	Candidate	Votes	%
Republican	Gary Daniels	1,269	28.27
Republican	Vanessa Sheehan (Incumbent)	1,113	24.80
Republican	Michael Facques	1,076	23.98
Republican	Elizabeth Keenan	1,030	22.95
Total votes		4,488	100.00

==== 44th District ====
Hillsborough’s 44th District Democratic primary details

Democratic Primary, Hillsborough’s 44th District (2 seats)
Party	Candidate	Votes	%
Democratic	Marie B. Morgan	1,844	52.88
Democratic	Eric Emmerling	1,643	47.12
Total votes		3,487	100.00

Hillsborough’s 44th District Republican primary details

Republican Primary, Hillsborough’s 44th District (2 seats)
Party	Candidate	Votes	%
Republican	Lisa Mazur (Incumbent)	2,600	53.16
Republican	Ross Berry	2,291	46.84
Total votes		4,891	100.00

==== 45th District ====
Hillsborough’s 45th District Democratic primary details

Democratic Primary, Hillsborough’s 45th District (1 seat)
Party	Candidate	Votes	%
Democratic	Karen Calabro (Incumbent)	Unopposed	
Total votes		1,633	100.0

Hillsborough’s 45th District Republican primary details

Republican Primary, Hillsborough’s 45th District (1 seat)
Party	Candidate	Votes	%
Republican	Jack Flanagan	Unopposed	
Total votes		1,829	100.0

=== Merrimack County ===
==== 1st District ====
Merrimack’s 1st District Democratic primary details

Democratic Primary, Merrimack’s 1st District (1 seat)
Party	Candidate	Votes	%
Democratic	Lorrie Carey (Incumbent)	Unopposed	
Total votes		253	100.0

Merrimack’s 1st District Republican primary details

Republican Primary, Merrimack’s 1st District (1 seat)
Party	Candidate	Votes	%
Republican	Rick Devoid	Unopposed	
Total votes		293	100.0

==== 2nd District ====
No candidates filed to contest the Democratic Party primary election in Merrimack's 2nd District.

Merrimack’s 2nd District Republican primary details

Republican Primary, Merrimack’s 2nd District (1 seat)
Party	Candidate	Votes	%
Republican	Greg Hill	Unopposed	
Total votes		474	100.0

==== 3rd District ====
Merrimack’s 3rd District Democratic primary details

Democratic Primary, Merrimack’s 3rd District (2 seats)
Party	Candidate	Votes	%
Democratic	Scott A. Burns	443	54.29
Democratic	Justine Hoppe	373	45.71
Total votes		816	100.00

Merrimack’s 3rd District Republican primary details

Republican Primary, Merrimack’s 3rd District (2 seats)
Party	Candidate	Votes	%
Republican	Bryan Morse	503	38.19
Republican	Ernesto L. Gonzalez	481	36.52
Republican	Werner D. Horn	333	25.28
Total votes		1,317	100.00

==== 4th District ====
Merrimack’s 4th District Democratic primary details

Democratic Primary, Merrimack’s 4th District (2 seats)
Party	Candidate	Votes	%
Democratic	Ruth Heath	898	56.73
Democratic	Edward R. Friedrich	685	43.27
Total votes		1,583	100.00

Merrimack’s 4th District Republican primary details

Republican Primary, Merrimack’s 4th District (2 seats)
Party	Candidate	Votes	%
Republican	Michael Moffett	910	43.73
Republican	Jose Cambrils	785	37.72
Republican	Werner Carolyn A. Virtue	386	18.55
Total votes		2,081	100.00

==== 5th District ====
Merrimack’s 5th District Democratic primary details

Democratic Primary, Merrimack’s 5th District (2 seats)
Party	Candidate	Votes	%
Democratic	Lorna Carlisle	688	53.09
Democratic	David A. Nesbitt	608	46.91
Total votes		1,296	100.00

Merrimack’s 5th District Republican primary details

Republican Primary, Merrimack’s 5th District (2 seats)
Party	Candidate	Votes	%
Republican	Louise Andrus (Incumbent)	795	57.57
Republican	Deborah Aylward (Incumbent)	586	42.33
Total votes		1,381	100.00

==== 6th District ====
Merrimack’s 6th District Democratic primary details

Democratic Primary, Merrimack’s 6th District (1 seat)
Party	Candidate	Votes	%
Democratic	Tom Schamberg (Incumbent)	Unopposed	
Total votes		517	100.0

Merrimack’s 6th District Republican primary details

Republican Primary, Merrimack’s 6th District (1 seat)
Party	Candidate	Votes	%
Republican	Victor Prieto	Unopposed	
Total votes		357	100.0

==== 7th District ====
Merrimack’s 7th District Democratic primary details

Democratic Primary, Merrimack’s 7th District (2 seats)
Party	Candidate	Votes	%
Democratic	Karen Ebel (Incumbent)	1,090	55.22
Democratic	Gregory M. Sargent	884	44.78
Total votes		1,974	100.00

Merrimack’s 7th District Republican primary details

Republican Primary, Merrimack’s 7th District (2 seats)
Party	Candidate	Votes	%
Republican	Dorothy L. Hitchmoth	692	57.24
Republican	Claire A. Ketteler	517	42.76
Total votes		1,209	100.00

==== 8th District ====
Merrimack’s 8th District Democratic primary details

Democratic Primary, Merrimack’s 8th District (3 seats)
Party	Candidate	Votes	%
Democratic	Stephanie Payeur (Incumbent)	1,003	33.59
Democratic	Eileen Kelly	997	33.39
Democratic	Tony Caplan (Incumbent)	986	33.02
Total votes		2,986	100.00

Merrimack’s 8th District Republican primary details

Republican Primary, Merrimack’s 8th District (3 seats)
Party	Candidate	Votes	%
Republican	Natalie Wells	740	40.24
Republican	James Bass Parker	553	30.07
Republican	Sherry Gould (Incumbent)	546	29.69
Total votes		1,839	100.00

==== 9th District ====
Merrimack’s 9th District Democratic primary details

Democratic Primary, Merrimack’s 9th District (4 seats)
Party	Candidate	Votes	%
Democratic	Muriel Hall (Incumbent)	2,073	26.29
Democratic	Eleana Marie Colby	1,834	23.25
Democratic	David Luneau (Incumbent)	1,731	21.95
Democratic	James Newsom	1,528	19.37
Democratic	Nicholas J. Lydon	721	9.14
Total votes		7,887	100.00

Merrimack’s 9th District Republican primary details

Republican Primary, Merrimack’s 9th District (4 seats)
Party	Candidate	Votes	%
Republican	Matthew Poulin	1,174	28.39
Republican	David Germain	1,030	24.91
Republican	John F. Martin	987	23.87
Republican	Darlene Gildersleeve	944	22.83
Total votes		4,135	100.00

==== 10th District ====
Merrimack’s 10th District Democratic primary details

Democratic Primary, Merrimack’s 10th District (4 seats)
Party	Candidate	Votes	%
Democratic	William P. Lynch	1,054	26.41
Democratic	Madalasa Gurung	999	25.04
Democratic	Robert A. Ray	995	24.94
Democratic	Germano Martins	942	23.61
Total votes		3,990	100.00

Merrimack’s 10th District Republican primary details

Republican Primary, Merrimack’s 10th District (4 seats)
Party	Candidate	Votes	%
Republican	Thomas Walsh (Incumbent)	1,426	26.55
Republican	John Leavitt (Incumbent)	1,421	26.46
Republican	Stephen Boyd (Incumbent)	1,295	24.11
Republican	Yury Polozov	1,229	22.88
Total votes		5,371	100.00

==== 11th District ====
Merrimack’s 11th District Democratic primary details

Democratic Primary, Merrimack’s 11th District (1 seat)
Party	Candidate	Votes	%
Democratic	Alisson Turcotte (Incumbent)	Unopposed	
Total votes		325	100.0

Merrimack’s 11th District Republican primary details

Republican Primary, Merrimack’s 11th District (1 seat)
Party	Candidate	Votes	%
Republican	Matthew Pitaro	Unopposed	
Total votes		374	100.0

==== 12th District ====
Merrimack’s 12th District Democratic primary details

Democratic Primary, Merrimack’s 12th District (2 seats)
Party	Candidate	Votes	%
Democratic	Dianne Schuett (Incumbent)	621	57.45
Democratic	Maurice Regan	460	42.55
Total votes		1,081	100.00

Merrimack’s 12th District Republican primary details

Republican Primary, Merrimack’s 12th District (2 seats)
Party	Candidate	Votes	%
Republican	Brian Seaworth (Incumbent)	526	46.02
Republican	Peter Mehegan	353	30.88
Republican	Charles E. Therrien	264	23.10
Total votes		1,143	100.00

==== 13th District ====
Merrimack’s 13th District Democratic primary details

Democratic Primary, Merrimack’s 13th District (2 seats)
Party	Candidate	Votes	%
Democratic	Sally Kelly	423	59.66
Democratic	Dan Schroth	286	40.34
Total votes		709	100.00

Merrimack’s 13th District Republican primary details

Republican Primary, Merrimack’s 13th District (2 seats)
Party	Candidate	Votes	%
Republican	Clayton Wood (Incumbent)	740	47.68
Republican	Cyril Aures (Incumbent)	631	40.66
Republican	Sabrina Ann Smith	181	11.66
Total votes		1,552	100.00

==== 14th District ====
No candidates filed to contest the Democratic Party primary election in Merrimack's 14th District.

Merrimack’s 14th District Republican primary details

Republican Primary, Merrimack’s 14th District (1 seat)
Party	Candidate	Votes	%
Republican	Dan McGuire (Incumbent)	Unopposed	
Total votes		589	100.0

==== 15th District ====
Merrimack’s 15th District Democratic primary details

Democratic Primary, Merrimack’s 15th District (1 seat)
Party	Candidate	Votes	%
Democratic	Tracy Anne Bricchi	Unopposed	
Total votes		431	100.0

No candidates filed to contest the Republican Party primary election in Merrimack’s 15th District.

==== 16th District ====
Merrimack’s 16th District Democratic primary details

Democratic Primary, Merrimack’s 16th District (1 seat)
Party	Candidate	Votes	%
Democratic	Connie Lane (Incumbent)	Unopposed	
Total votes		405	100.0

Merrimack’s 16th District Republican primary details

Republican Primary, Merrimack’s 16th District (1 seat)
Party	Candidate	Votes	%
Republican	Laurence R. Weissbrot	Unopposed	
Total votes		234	100.0

==== 17th District ====
Merrimack’s 17th District Democratic primary details

Democratic Primary, Merrimack’s 17th District (1 seat)
Party	Candidate	Votes	%
Democratic	Beth Richards (Incumbent)	Unopposed	
Total votes		316	100.0

Merrimack’s 17th District Republican primary details

Republican Primary, Merrimack’s 17th District (1 seat)
Party	Candidate	Votes	%
Republican	Diana Freeman	Unopposed	
Total votes		157	100.0

==== 18th District ====
Merrimack’s 18th District Democratic primary details

Democratic Primary, Merrimack’s 18th District (1 seat)
Party	Candidate	Votes	%
Democratic	James MacKay (Incumbent)	Unopposed	
Total votes		552	100.0

Merrimack’s 18th District Republican primary details

Republican Primary, Merrimack’s 18th District (1 seat)
Party	Candidate	Votes	%
Republican	Kristen Jackson	Unopposed	
Total votes		168	100.0

==== 19th District ====
Merrimack’s 19th District Democratic primary details

Democratic Primary, Merrimack’s 19th District (1 seat)
Party	Candidate	Votes	%
Democratic	Mary Jane Wallner (Incumbent)	Unopposed	
Total votes		960	100.0

No candidates filed to contest the Republican Party primary election in Merrimack’s 19th District.

==== 20th District ====
Merrimack’s 20th District Democratic primary details

Democratic Primary, Merrimack’s 20th District (1 seat)
Party	Candidate	Votes	%
Democratic	Eric Gallager (Incumbent)	Unopposed	
Total votes		430	100.0

No candidates filed to contest the Republican Party primary election in Merrimack’s 20th District.

==== 21st District ====
Merrimack’s 21st District Democratic primary details

Democratic Primary, Merrimack’s 21st District (1 seat)
Party	Candidate	Votes	%
Democratic	Timothy Soucy (Incumbent)	Unopposed	
Total votes		805	100.0

Merrimack’s 21st District Republican primary details

Republican Primary, Merrimack’s 21st District (1 seat)
Party	Candidate	Votes	%
Republican	Robert G. Bertrand	Unopposed	
Total votes		283	100.0

==== 22nd District ====
Merrimack’s 22nd District Democratic primary details

Democratic Primary, Merrimack’s 22nd District (1 seat)
Party	Candidate	Votes	%
Democratic	James Roesener (Incumbent)	Unopposed	
Total votes		432	100.0

Merrimack’s 22nd District Republican primary details

Republican Primary, Merrimack’s 22nd District (1 seat)
Party	Candidate	Votes	%
Republican	Dennis Blankenbeker	Unopposed	
Total votes		307	100.0

==== 23rd District ====
Merrimack’s 23rd District Democratic primary details

Democratic Primary, Merrimack’s 23rd District (1 seat)
Party	Candidate	Votes	%
Democratic	Merryl Gibbs (Incumbent)	Unopposed	
Total votes		448	100.0

Merrimack’s 23rd District Republican primary details

Republican Primary, Merrimack’s 23rd District (1 seat)
Party	Candidate	Votes	%
Republican	Andrew Georgevits	Unopposed	
Total votes		207	100.0

==== 24th District ====
Merrimack’s 24th District Democratic primary details

Democratic Primary, Merrimack’s 24th District (1 seat)
Party	Candidate	Votes	%
Democratic	Matthew Hicks (Incumbent)	Unopposed	
Total votes		793	100.0

Merrimack’s 24th District Republican primary details

Republican Primary, Merrimack’s 24th District (1 seat)
Party	Candidate	Votes	%
Republican	Thom Bloomquist	Unopposed	
Total votes		399	100.0

==== 25th District ====
Merrimack’s 25th District Democratic primary details

Democratic Primary, Merrimack’s 25th District (1 seat)
Party	Candidate	Votes	%
Democratic	Joyce May Fulweiler	Unopposed	
Total votes		785	100.0

Merrimack’s 25th District Republican primary details

Republican Primary, Merrimack’s 25th District (1 seat)
Party	Candidate	Votes	%
Republican	James Thibualt	682	52.62
Republican	Brandon Stevens	614	47.38
Total votes		1,296	100.00

==== 26th District ====
Merrimack’s 26th District Democratic primary details

Democratic Primary, Merrimack’s 26th District (1 seat)
Party	Candidate	Votes	%
Democratic	Mason Donovan	Unopposed	
Total votes		1,802	100.0

Merrimack’s 26th District Republican primary details

Republican Primary, Merrimack’s 26th District (1 seat)
Party	Candidate	Votes	%
Republican	Alvin See (Incumbent)	Unopposed	
Total votes		2,257	100.0

==== 27th District ====
Merrimack’s 27th District Democratic primary details

Democratic Primary, Merrimack’s 27th District (2 seats)
Party	Candidate	Votes	%
Democratic	Phillip James Walker	1,763	97.30
Write-In	Kathleen Martins	49	2.70
Total votes		1,812	100.00

Merrimack’s 27th District Republican primary details

Republican Primary, Merrimack’s 27th District (1 seat)
Party	Candidate	Votes	%
Republican	Carol McGuire (Incumbent)	2,332	53.01
Republican	Ray Plante	2,067	46.99
Total votes		4,399	100.00

==== 28th District ====
Merrimack’s 28th District Democratic primary details

Democratic Primary, Merrimack’s 28th District (1 seat)
Party	Candidate	Votes	%
Democratic	Jim Snodgrass	Unopposed	
Total votes		1,127	100.0

Merrimack’s 28th District Republican primary details

Republican Primary, Merrimack’s 28th District (1 seat)
Party	Candidate	Votes	%
Republican	Brian Blackden	Unopposed	
Total votes		615	100.0

==== 29th District ====
Merrimack’s 29th District Democratic primary details

Democratic Primary, Merrimack’s 29th District (1 seat)
Party	Candidate	Votes	%
Democratic	Kris Schultz (Incumbent)	Unopposed	
Total votes		1,748	100.0

Merrimack’s 29th District Republican primary details

Republican Primary, Merrimack’s 29th District (1 seat)
Party	Candidate	Votes	%
Republican	Claude Lompufu Bongambe	Unopposed	
Total votes		707	100.0

==== 30th District ====
Merrimack’s 30th District Democratic primary details

Democratic Primary, Merrimack’s 30th District (1 seat)
Party	Candidate	Votes	%
Democratic	Gary L. Woods	Unopposed	
Total votes		2,572	100.0

Merrimack’s 30th District Republican primary details

Republican Primary, Merrimack’s 30th District (1 seat)
Party	Candidate	Votes	%
Republican	Robert C. Washburn Sr.	Unopposed	
Total votes		952	100.0

=== Rockinghams County ===
==== 1st District ====
Rockingham’s 1st District Republican primary details

Republican Primary, Rockingham’s 1st District (3 seats)
Party	Candidate	Votes	%
Republican	James Guzofski	978	35.09
Republican	Scott R. Bryer	915	32.83
Republican	Paul Tudor (Incumbent)	894	32.08
Total votes		2,787	100.00

==== 2nd District ====
Rockingham’s 2nd District Republican primary details

Republican Primary, Rockingham’s 2nd District (3 seats)
Party	Candidate	Votes	%
Republican	Jason Osborne (Incumbent)	1,981	35.91
Republican	Kevin Verville (Incumbent)	1,803	32.69
Republican	James Spillane (Incumbent)	1,732	31.40
Total votes		5,516	100.00

==== 3rd District ====
Rockingham’s 3rd District Democratic primary details

Democratic Primary, Rockingham’s 3rd District (1 seat)
Party	Candidate	Votes	%
Democratic	Jane W. Van Zandt	Unopposed	
Total votes		306	100.0

Rockingham’s 3rd District Republican primary details

Republican Primary, Rockingham’s 3rd District (1 seat)
Party	Candidate	Votes	%
Republican	Mary Ford	Unopposed	
Total votes		707	100.0

==== 4th District ====
Rockingham’s 4th District Republican primary details

Republican Primary, Rockingham’s 4th District (3 seats)
Party	Candidate	Votes	%
Republican	Mike Drago (Incumbent)	916	26.03
Republican	Brian Nadeau	709	20.15
Republican	Cindy Bennett	605	17.19
Republican	Kevin Pratt (Incumbent)	575	16.34
Republican	Tim Cahill (Incumbent)	456	12.96
Republican	John O’Blenis III	258	7.33
Total votes		3,519	100.00

==== 5th District ====
Rockingham’s 5th District Republican primary details

Republican Primary, Rockingham’s 5th District (2 seats)
Party	Candidate	Votes	%
Republican	Michael Vose (Incumbent)	780	54.02
Republican	Cody M. Belanger	664	45.98
Total votes		1,444	100.00

==== 6th District ====
Rockingham’s 6th District Democratic primary details

Democratic Primary, Rockingham’s 6th District (1 seat)
Party	Candidate	Votes	%
Democratic	Eric Turer (Incumbent)	Unopposed	
Total votes		430	100.0

Rockingham’s 6th District Republican primary details

Republican Primary, Rockingham’s 6th District (1 seat)
Party	Candidate	Votes	%
Republican	Allen Cook	443	57.53
Republican	Thaddeus Paul Riley	327	42.47
Total votes		770	100.00

==== 7th District ====
No candidates filed to contest the Democratic Party primary election in Rockingham's 7th District.

Rockingham’s 7th District Republican primary details

Republican Primary, Rockingham’s 7th District (1 seat)
Party	Candidate	Votes	%
Republican	Lawrence Miner	465	50.93
Republican	Josh Yokela	418	45.78
Republican	Kalup Nathan Veneman	30	3.29
Total votes		913	100.00

==== 8th District ====
Rockingham’s 8th District Democratic primary details

Democratic Primary, Rockingham’s 8th District (1 seat)
Party	Candidate	Votes	%
Democratic	Sheila Johannesen	Unopposed	
Total votes		224	100.0

Rockingham’s 8th District Republican primary details

Republican Primary, Rockingham’s 8th District (1 seat)
Party	Candidate	Votes	%
Republican	Sarya Lynn DeVito	Unopposed	
Total votes		569	100.0

==== 9th District ====
Rockingham’s 9th District Republican primary details

Republican Primary, Rockingham’s 9th District (2 seats)
Party	Candidate	Votes	%
Republican	Vicki Wilson	751	50.71
Republican	Donald Evan Selby	730	49.29
Total votes		1,481	100.00

==== 10th District ====
Rockingham’s 10th District Republican primary details

Republican Primary, Rockingham’s 10th District (3 seats)
Party	Candidate	Votes	%
Republican	Jeanene Cooper	Unopposed	
Total votes		827	100.0

==== 11th District ====
Rockingham’s 11th District Republican primary details

Republican Primary, Rockingham’s 11th District (4 seats)
Party	Candidate	Votes	%
Republican	Brian Griset	706	34.81
Republican	William A. Smith	665	32.79
Republican	Robert Goeman	657	32.40
Total votes		2,028	100.00

==== 12th District ====
Rockingham’s 12th District Republican primary details

Republican Primary, Rockingham’s 12th District (4 seats)
Party	Candidate	Votes	%
Republican	James Scamman	787	56.83
Republican	Jessica Kliskey	597	43.17
Total votes		1,383	100.00

==== 13th District ====
Rockingham’s 13th District Republican primary details

Republican Primary, Rockingham’s 13th District (10 seats)
Party	Candidate	Votes	%
Republican	David Love (Incumbent)	1,906	10.73
Republican	John Potucek (Incumbent)	1,761	9.92
Republican	Jodi Nelson (Incumbent)	1,707	9.61
Republican	Charles Foote (Incumbent)	1,693	9.53
Republican	Erica Layon (Incumbent)	1,681	9.47
Republican	Phyllis Katsakiores (Incumbent)	1,653	9.31
Republican	Stephen Pearson (Incumbent)	1,588	8.94
Republican	Richard Tripp (Incumbent)	1,537	8.66
Republican	David Milz (Incumbent)	1,530	8.62
Republican	Katherine Prudhomme O'Brien (Incumbent)	1,486	8.37
Republican	James E. Dietzel	1,216	6.84
Total votes		17,758	100.00

==== 14th District ====
Rockingham’s 14th District Republican primary details

Republican Primary, Rockingham’s 14th District (2 seats)
Party	Candidate	Votes	%
Republican	Kenneth Weyler (Incumbent)	789	38.83
Republican	Pam Brown	637	31.35
Republican	Ted Lloyd	606	29.82
Total votes		2,032	100.00

==== 15th District ====
Rockingham’s 15th District Republican primary details

Republican Primary, Rockingham’s 15th District (2 seats)
Party	Candidate	Votes	%
Republican	Joseph Guthrie (Incumbent)	870	39.47
Republican	Lilli Walsh (Incumbent)	823	37.34
Republican	Cale Houston	511	23.19
Total votes		2,204	100.00

==== 16th District ====
Rockingham’s 16th District Republican primary details

Republican Primary, Rockingham’s 16th District (7 seats)
Party	Candidate	Votes	%
Republican	Ron Dunn (Incumbent)	1,808	12.86
Republican	Kristine Perez (Incumbent)	1,645	11.70
Republican	David Lundgren (Incumbent)	1,626	11.56
Republican	Tom Dolan (Incumbent)	1,612	11.47
Republican	Sherman Packard (Incumbent)	1,610	11.45
Republican	Wayne MacDonald (Incumbent)	1,440	10.24
Republican	Douglas Thomas (Incumbent)	1,399	9.95
Republican	Moira K. Ryan (Incumbent)	1,207	8.58
Republican	Joseph M. Gagnon (Incumbent)	1,173	8.34
Republican	Eric Cooper (Incumbent)	540	3.85
Total votes		14,060	100.00

==== 17th District ====
Rockingham’s 17th District Republican primary details

Republican Primary, Rockingham’s 17th District (4 seats)
Party	Candidate	Votes	%
Republican	Charles McMahon (Incumbent)	1,270	26.43
Republican	Bob Lynn (Incumbent)	1,189	24.75
Republican	Katelyn Kuttab (Incumbent)	1,181	24.58
Republican	Daniel Popovici-Muller (Incumbent)	1,165	24.24
Total votes		4,805	100.00

==== 18th District ====
Rockingham’s 18th District Democratic primary details

Democratic Primary, Rockingham’s 18th District (2 seats)
Party	Candidate	Votes	%
Democratic	Michael Boucher	Unopposed	
Total votes		492	100.0

Rockingham’s 18th District Republican primary details

Republican Primary, Rockingham’s 18th District (2 seats)
Party	Candidate	Votes	%
Republican	Debra DeSimone (Incumbent)	993	54.77
Republican	Jay Markell	820	45.23
Total votes		1,813	100.00

==== 19th District ====
Rockingham’s 19th District Democratic primary details

Democratic Primary, Rockingham’s 19th District (1 seat)
Party	Candidate	Votes	%
Democratic	Wendy Larson	Unopposed	
Total votes		394	100.0

Rockingham’s 19th District Republican primary details

Republican Primary, Rockingham’s 19th District (1 seat)
Party	Candidate	Votes	%
Republican	Susan Porcelli (Incumbent)	Unopposed	
Total votes		634	100.0

==== 20th District ====
Rockingham’s 20th District Republican primary details

Republican Primary, Rockingham’s 20th District (2 seats)
Party	Candidate	Votes	%
Republican	Robert Harb (Incumbent)	1,023	36.11
Republican	Charles Melvin (Incumbent)	986	34.80
Republican	James Summers (Incumbent)	824	29.09
Total votes		2,833	100.00

==== 21st District ====
Rockingham’s 21st District Democratic primary details

Democratic Primary, Rockingham’s 21st District (1 seat)
Party	Candidate	Votes	%
Democratic	Jennifer Mandelbaum	Unopposed	
Total votes		618	100.0

No candidates filed to contest the Republican Party primary election in Rockingham’s 21st District.

==== 22nd District ====
Rockingham’s 22nd District Democratic primary details

Democratic Primary, Rockingham’s 22nd District (1 seat)
Party	Candidate	Votes	%
Democratic	Kate Murray (Incumbent)	Unopposed	
Total votes		965	100.0

Rockingham’s 22nd District Republican primary details

Republican Primary, Rockingham’s 22nd District (1 seat)
Party	Candidate	Votes	%
Republican	Thom Rossi	Unopposed	
Total votes		268	100.0

==== 23rd District ====
Rockingham’s 23rd District Democratic primary details

Democratic Primary, Rockingham’s 23rd District (1 seat)
Party	Candidate	Votes	%
Democratic	Jim Maggiore (Incumbent)	Unopposed	
Total votes		499	100.0

Rockingham’s 23rd District Republican primary details

Republican Primary, Rockingham’s 23rd District (1 seat)
Party	Candidate	Votes	%
Republican	Jennifer L. Smith	Unopposed	
Total votes		512	100.0

==== 24th District ====
Rockingham’s 24th District Republican primary details

Republican Primary, Rockingham’s 24th District (4 seats)
Party	Candidate	Votes	%
Republican	Marilyn Page	982	53.25
Republican	Kevin Szmyd	862	46.75
Total votes		1,844	100.00

==== 25th District ====
Rockingham’s 25th District Republican primary details

Republican Primary, Rockingham’s 25th District (9 seats)
Party	Candidate	Votes	%
Republican	Fred Doucette (Incumbent)	2,364	12.31
Republican	John Janigian (Incumbent)	2,307	12.02
Republican	Joseph Sweeney (Incumbent)	2,247	11.71
Republican	Lorie Ball (Incumbent)	2,221	11.57
Republican	John Sytek (Incumbent)	1,988	10.36
Republican	Valerie McDonnell (Incumbent)	1,868	9.73
Republican	Dennis Mannion (Incumbent)	1,813	9.45
Republican	Tanya Donnelly (Incumbent)	1,776	9.25
Republican	Susan Vandecasteele (Incumbent)	1,773	9.24
Republican	Betty I. Gay	837	4.36
Total votes		19,194	100.00

==== 26th District ====
Rockingham’s 26th District Democratic primary details

Democratic Primary, Rockingham’s 26th District (1 seat)
Party	Candidate	Votes	%
Democratic	Buzz Scherr	Unopposed	
Total votes		496	100.0

No candidates filed to contest the Republican Party primary election in Rockingham’s 26th District.

==== 27th District ====
Rockingham’s 27th District Democratic primary details

Democratic Primary, Rockingham’s 27th District (1 seat)
Party	Candidate	Votes	%
Democratic	Gerry Ward (Incumbent)	Unopposed	
Total votes		420	100.0

Rockingham’s 27th District Republican primary details

Republican Primary, Rockingham’s 27th District (1 seat)
Party	Candidate	Votes	%
Republican	Diane D. Bitter	Unopposed	
Total votes		237	100.0

==== 28th District ====
Rockingham’s 28th District Democratic primary details

Democratic Primary, Rockingham’s 28th District (1 seat)
Party	Candidate	Votes	%
Democratic	Carrie Sorensen	Unopposed	
Total votes		698	100.0

Rockingham’s 28th District Republican primary details

Republican Primary, Rockingham’s 28th District (1 seat)
Party	Candidate	Votes	%
Republican	Due Polidura	Unopposed	
Total votes		172	100.0

==== 29th District ====
Rockingham’s 29th District Republican primary details
Nicholas Bridle

Republican Primary, Rockingham’s 29th District (4 seats)
Party	Candidate	Votes	%
Republican	David Hagen	1,104	21.32
Republican	Nicholas D. Bridle	1,059	20.45
Republican	Ken Sheffert	1,044	20.16
Republican	Bruce Theriault	1,036	20.01
Republican	George R. Attar	935	18.06
Total votes		5,178	100.00

==== 30th District ====
Rockingham’s 30th District Republican primary details

Republican Primary, Rockingham’s 30th District (2 seats)
Party	Candidate	Votes	%
Republican	Aboul Khan (Incumbent)	536	31.24
Republican	Matt Sabourin	531	30.94
Republican	Jason A. Janvrin	432	25.17
Republican	William L. Fowler	217	12.65
Total votes		1,716	100.00

==== 31st District ====
Rockingham’s 31st District Republican primary details

Republican Primary, Rockingham’s 31st District (2 seats)
Party	Candidate	Votes	%
Republican	Jess Edwards (Incumbent)	2,591	53.17
Republican	Terry Roy (Incumbent)	2,282	46.83
Total votes		4,873	100.00

==== 32nd District ====
Rockingham’s 32nd District Democratic primary details

Democratic Primary, Rockingham’s 32nd District (1 seat)
Party	Candidate	Votes	%
Democratic	Diana West	Unopposed	
Total votes		887	100.0

Rockingham’s 32nd District Republican primary details

Republican Primary, Rockingham’s 32nd District (1 seat)
Party	Candidate	Votes	%
Republican	Melissa Litchfield	1,334	57.25
Republican	Scott Wallace	996	42.75
Total votes		2,330	100.00

==== 33rd District ====
Rockingham’s 33rd District Democratic primary details

Democratic Primary, Rockingham’s 33rd District (1 seat)
Party	Candidate	Votes	%
Democratic	Alexis Simpson (Incumbent)	Unopposed	
Total votes		4,601	100.0

No candidates filed to contest the Republican Party primary election in Rockingham’s 33rd District.

==== 34th District ====
Rockingham’s 34th District Democratic primary details

Democratic Primary, Rockingham’s 34th District (1 seat)
Party	Candidate	Votes	%
Democratic	Jade DeMio	Unopposed	
Total votes		1,109	100.0

Rockingham’s 34th District Republican primary details

Republican Primary, Rockingham’s 34th District (1 seat)
Party	Candidate	Votes	%
Republican	Mark Pearson (Incumbent)	Unopposed	
Total votes		2,238	100.0

==== 35th District ====
Rockingham’s 35th District Democratic primary details

Democratic Primary, Rockingham’s 35th District (1 seat)
Party	Candidate	Votes	%
Democratic	Michelle Stith	Unopposed	
Total votes		2,205	100.0

Rockingham’s 35th District Republican primary details

Republican Primary, Rockingham’s 35th District (1 seat)
Party	Candidate	Votes	%
Republican	Julius Soti (Incumbent)	Unopposed	
Total votes		3,412	100.0

==== 36th District ====
Rockingham’s 36th District Democratic primary details

Democratic Primary, Rockingham’s 36th District (1 seat)
Party	Candidate	Votes	%
Democratic	Eric B. Miller	Unopposed	
Total votes		993	100.0

Rockingham’s 36th District Republican primary details

Republican Primary, Rockingham’s 36th District (1 seat)
Party	Candidate	Votes	%
Republican	JD Bernardy (Incumbent)	Unopposed	
Total votes		1,771	100.0

==== 37th District ====
Rockingham’s 37th District Democratic primary details

Democratic Primary, Rockingham’s 37th District (1 seat)
Party	Candidate	Votes	%
Democratic	David Meuse (Incumbent)	Unopposed	
Total votes		1,552	100.0

No candidates filed to contest the Republican Party primary election in Rockingham’s 37th District.

==== 38th District ====
Rockingham’s 38th District Democratic primary details

Democratic Primary, Rockingham’s 38th District (1 seat)
Party	Candidate	Votes	%
Democratic	Peggy Balboni (Incumbent)	Unopposed	
Total votes		1,683	100.0

Rockingham’s 38th District Republican primary details

Republican Primary, Rockingham’s 38th District (1 seat)
Party	Candidate	Votes	%
Write-in	Janet Larsen	Unopposed	
Total votes		107	100.0

==== 39th District ====
Rockingham’s 39th District Democratic primary details

Democratic Primary, Rockingham’s 39th District (1 seat)
Party	Candidate	Votes	%
Democratic	Ned Raynolds (Incumbent)	Unopposed	
Total votes		1,610	100.0

No candidates filed to contest the Republican Party primary election in Rockingham’s 39th District.

==== 40th District ====
Rockingham’s 40th District Democratic primary details

Democratic Primary, Rockingham’s 40th District (1 seat)
Party	Candidate	Votes	%
Democratic	John P. Carty	Unopposed	
Total votes		1,705	100.0

Rockingham’s 40th District Republican primary details

Republican Primary, Rockingham’s 40th District (1 seat)
Party	Candidate	Votes	%
Republican	Linda McGrath	1,340	50.02
Republican	Richard E. Sawyer Jr.	1,339	49.98
Total votes		2,679	100.00

=== Strafford County ===
==== 1st District ====
Strafford’s 1st District Democratic primary details

Democratic Primary, Strafford’s 1st District (2 seats)
Party	Candidate	Votes	%
Democratic	Manny Krasner	349	73.94
Write-in	Fred Pitman	70	14.83
Write-in	Ricky Campbell	53	11.23
Total votes		472	100.00

Strafford’s 1st District Republican primary details

Republican Primary, Strafford’s 1st District (2 seats)
Party	Candidate	Votes	%
Republican	Sue DeLemus	424	61.01
Republican	Robley Hall	271	38.99
Total votes		695	100.00

==== 2nd District ====
Strafford’s 2nd District Democratic primary details

Democratic Primary, Strafford’s 2nd District (3 seats)
Party	Candidate	Votes	%
Democratic	Pamela Hubbard	411	36.08
Democratic	Larry Brown	374	32.84
Democratic	Marilyn J. Foster	354	31.08
Total votes		1,139	100.00

Strafford’s 2nd District Republican primary details

Republican Primary, Strafford’s 2nd District (3 seats)
Party	Candidate	Votes	%
Republican	Glenn Bailey (Incumbent)	666	34.52
Republican	Claudine Burnham (Incumbent)	634	32.87
Republican	Michael Granger (Incumbent)	629	32.61
Total votes		1,929	100.00

==== 3rd District ====
Strafford’s 3rd District Democratic primary details

Democratic Primary, Strafford’s 3rd District (1 seat)
Party	Candidate	Votes	%
Democratic	Ellen Phillips	Unopposed	
Total votes		252	100.0

Strafford’s 3rd District Republican primary details

Republican Primary, Strafford’s 3rd District (1 seat)
Party	Candidate	Votes	%
Republican	Susan DeRoy	542	70.66
Republican	David Bickford (Incumbent)	225	29.34
Total votes		767	100.00

==== 4th District ====
Strafford’s 4th District Democratic primary details

Democratic Primary, Strafford’s 4th District (3 seats)
Party	Candidate	Votes	%
Democratic	Cassandra Levesque (Incumbent)	1,153	34.94
Democratic	Heath Howard (Incumbent)	1,129	34.21
Democratic	Adam Mulholland	1,018	30.85
Total votes		3,300	100.00

Strafford’s 4th District Republican primary details

Republican Primary, Strafford’s 4th District (3 seats)
Party	Candidate	Votes	%
Republican	Len Turcotte (Incumbent)	1,149	37.31
Republican	Kurt Wuelper	989	32.11
Republican	Seamus Casey	942	30.58
Total votes		3,080	100.00

==== 5th District ====
Strafford’s 5th District Democratic primary details

Democratic Primary, Strafford’s 5th District (1 seat)
Party	Candidate	Votes	%
Democratic	Patricia Turner	Unopposed	
Total votes		369	100.0

Strafford’s 5th District Republican primary details

Republican Primary, Strafford’s 5th District (1 seat)
Party	Candidate	Votes	%
Republican	Thomas Kaczynski Jr. (Incumbent)	Unopposed	
Total votes		431	100.0

==== 6th District ====
Strafford’s 6th District Democratic primary details

Democratic Primary, Strafford’s 6th District (1 seat)
Party	Candidate	Votes	%
Democratic	Kathleen MacLeod	Unopposed	
Total votes		363	100.0

Strafford’s 6th District Republican primary details

Republican Primary, Strafford’s 6th District (1 seat)
Party	Candidate	Votes	%
Republican	Denise DeDe-Poulin	Unopposed	
Total votes		375	100.0

==== 7th District ====
Strafford’s 7th District Democratic primary details

Democratic Primary, Strafford’s 7th District (1 seat)
Party	Candidate	Votes	%
Democratic	David Herman	Unopposed	
Total votes		246	100.0

Strafford’s 7th District Republican primary details

Republican Primary, Strafford’s 7th District (1 seat)
Party	Candidate	Votes	%
Republican	Aidan Ankarberg (Incumbent)	Unopposed	
Total votes		347	100.0

==== 8th District ====
Strafford’s 8th District Democratic primary details

Democratic Primary, Strafford’s 8th District (1 seat)
Party	Candidate	Votes	%
Democratic	Chuck Grassie (Incumbent)	Unopposed	
Total votes		314	100.0

Strafford’s 8th District Republican primary details

Republican Primary, Strafford’s 8th District (1 seat)
Party	Candidate	Votes	%
Republican	Samuel Farrington	Unopposed	
Total votes		379	100.0

==== 9th District ====
Strafford’s 9th District Democratic primary details

Democratic Primary, Strafford’s 9th District (1 seat)
Party	Candidate	Votes	%
Democratic	Amy Malone	Unopposed	
Total votes		273	100.0

Strafford’s 9th District Republican primary details

Republican Primary, Strafford’s 9th District (1 seat)
Party	Candidate	Votes	%
Republican	Amy Malone	Unopposed	
Total votes		264	100.0

==== 10th District ====
Strafford’s 10th District Democratic primary details

Democratic Primary, Strafford’s 10th District (4 seats)
Party	Candidate	Votes	%
Democratic	Loren Selig (Incumbent)	1,543	25.90
Democratic	Marjorie Smith (Incumbent)	1,386	23.27
Democratic	Timothy Horrigan (Incumbent)	1,270	21.32
Democratic	Wayne Burton	981	16.47
Democratic	Gale Bailey	777	13.04
Total votes		5,957	100.00

No candidates filed to contest the Republican Party primary election in Strafford’s 10th District.

==== 11th District ====
Strafford’s 11th District Democratic primary details

Democratic Primary, Strafford’s 11th District (3 seats)
Party	Candidate	Votes	%
Democratic	Janet Wall (Incumbent)	1,541	34.23
Democratic	Erik Johnson	1,283	28.50
Democratic	Thomas Southworth (Incumbent)	1,198	26.61
Democratic	Andrew Kennedy	480	10.66
Total votes		4,502	100.00

Strafford’s 11th District Republican primary details

Republican Primary, Strafford’s 11th District (3 seats)
Party	Candidate	Votes	%
Republican	Joe Bazo	628	34.37
Republican	Denis Grenier	602	32.95
Republican	Bill Taylor	597	32.68
Total votes		1,827	100.00

==== 12th District ====
Strafford’s 12th District Democratic primary details

Democratic Primary, Strafford’s 12th District (4 seats)
Party	Candidate	Votes	%
Democratic	Dawn M. Evans	1,005	26.66
Democratic	Myles England	942	24.99
Democratic	Wayne Pearson	919	24.38
Democratic	John J. Stone	903	23.97
Total votes		3,769	100.00

Strafford’s 12th District Republican primary details

Republican Primary, Strafford’s 12th District (4 seats)
Party	Candidate	Votes	%
Republican	Ken Hilton	733	28.17
Republican	Jonathan Wilson	647	24.87
Republican	Padraic O’Hare	624	23.98
Republican	Will Milus	598	22.98
Total votes		2,602	100.00

==== 13th District ====
Strafford’s 13th District Democratic primary details

Democratic Primary, Strafford’s 13th District (1 seat)
Party	Candidate	Votes	%
Democratic	Peter Bixby (Incumbent)	Unopposed	
Total votes		441	100.0

Strafford’s 13th District Republican primary details

Republican Primary, Strafford’s 13th District (1 seat)
Party	Candidate	Votes	%
Republican	Daniel A. Furman	Unopposed	
Total votes		350	100.0

==== 14th District ====
Strafford’s 14th District Democratic primary details

Democratic Primary, Strafford’s 14th District (1 seat)
Party	Candidate	Votes	%
Democratic	Peter B. Schmidt (Incumbent)	Unopposed	
Total votes		547	100.0

Strafford’s 14th District Republican primary details

Republican Primary, Strafford’s 14th District (1 seat)
Party	Candidate	Votes	%
Republican	Elliot Ross Boutin	Unopposed	
Total votes		132	100.0

==== 15th District ====
Strafford’s 15th District Democratic primary details

Democratic Primary, Strafford’s 15th District (1 seat)
Party	Candidate	Votes	%
Democratic	Alice Wade	405	71.05
Democratic	Lucas Veitch	165	28.95
Total votes		570	100.00

Strafford’s 15th District Republican primary details

Republican Primary, Strafford’s 15th District (1 seat)
Party	Candidate	Votes	%
Republican	Keith Mistretta	Unopposed	
Total votes		158	100.0

==== 16th District ====
Strafford’s 16th District Democratic primary details

Democratic Primary, Strafford’s 16th District (1 seat)
Party	Candidate	Votes	%
Democratic	Gary Gilmore	Unopposed	
Total votes		566	100.0

Strafford’s 16th District Republican primary details

Republican Primary, Strafford’s 16th District (1 seat)
Party	Candidate	Votes	%
Republican	Diana M. Day	Unopposed	
Total votes		332	100.0

==== 17th District ====
Strafford’s 17th District Democratic primary details

Democratic Primary, Strafford’s 17th District (1 seat)
Party	Candidate	Votes	%
Democratic	Jessica LaMontagne (Incumbent)	Unopposed	
Total votes		407	100.0

Strafford’s 17th District Republican primary details

Republican Primary, Strafford’s 17th District (1 seat)
Party	Candidate	Votes	%
Republican	Matthew D. Albion	Unopposed	
Total votes		218	100.0

==== 18th District ====
Strafford’s 18th District Democratic primary details

Democratic Primary, Strafford’s 18th District (1 seat)
Party	Candidate	Votes	%
Democratic	Kimberley McGlinchey	Unopposed	
Total votes		1,476	100.0

Strafford’s 18th District Republican primary details

Republican Primary, Strafford’s 18th District (1 seat)
Party	Candidate	Votes	%
Republican	Michael Harrington (Incumbent)	Unopposed	
Total votes		1,940	100.0

==== 19th District ====
Strafford’s 19th District Democratic primary details

Democratic Primary, Strafford’s 19th District (3 seats)
Party	Candidate	Votes	%
Democratic	Daniel Fitzpatrick (Incumbent)	1,091	27.90
Democratic	John Larochelle	1,023	26.16
Democratic	Melena Lugo	971	24.83
Democratic	Seph Warren	826	21.11
Total votes		3,911	100.00

Strafford’s 19th District Republican primary details

Republican Primary, Strafford’s 19th District (3 seats)
Party	Candidate	Votes	%
Republican	David Walker	1,571	39.93
Republican	Kelley Potenza (Incumbent)	1,224	31.09
Republican	Jenny O. Wilson	1,142	28.98
Total votes		3,937	100.00

==== 20th District ====
Strafford’s 20th District Democratic primary details

Democratic Primary, Strafford’s 20th District (1 seat)
Party	Candidate	Votes	%
Democratic	Allan Howland (Incumbent)	Unopposed	
Total votes		3,141	100.0

Strafford’s 20th District Republican primary details

Republican Primary, Strafford’s 20th District (1 seat)
Party	Candidate	Votes	%
Republican	Joseph Rowell	Unopposed	
Total votes		981	100.0

==== 21st District ====
Strafford’s 21st District Democratic primary details

Democratic Primary, Strafford’s 21st District (3 seats)
Party	Candidate	Votes	%
Democratic	Luz Bay (Incumbent)	2,430	39.18
Democratic	Seth Miller	1,931	31.14
Democratic	Geoffrey Smith (Incumbent)	1,841	29.68
Total votes		6,202	100.00

Strafford’s 21st District Republican primary details

Republican Primary, Strafford’s 21st District (3 seats)
Party	Candidate	Votes	%
Republican	Renee L. Blaisdell	1,024	34.56
Republican	John V. Caggiano	1,001	33.78
Republican	Gary Fratus	938	31.66
Total votes		2,963	100.00

=== Sullivan County ===
==== 1st District ====
Sullivan’s 1st District Democratic primary details

Democratic Primary, Sullivan’s 1st District (1 seat)
Party	Candidate	Votes	%
Democratic	Brian Sullivan (Incumbent)	Unopposed	
Total votes		554	100.0

Sullivan’s 1st District Republican primary details

Republican Primary, Sullivan’s 1st District (1 seat)
Party	Candidate	Votes	%
Republican	Joel T. Hutchins	Unopposed	
Total votes		229	100.0

==== 2nd District ====
Sullivan’s 2nd District Democratic primary details

Democratic Primary, Sullivan’s 2nd District (1 seat)
Party	Candidate	Votes	%
Democratic	William Palmer (Incumbent)	Unopposed	
Total votes		724	100.0

Sullivan’s 2nd District Republican primary details

Republican Primary, Sullivan’s 2nd District (1 seat)
Party	Candidate	Votes	%
Republican	Virginia Drye	Unopposed	
Total votes		324	100.0

==== 3rd District ====
Sullivan’s 3rd District Democratic primary details

Democratic Primary, Sullivan’s 3rd District (1 seat)
Party	Candidate	Votes	%
Democratic	Nikki Murphy	Unopposed	
Total votes		796	100.0

Sullivan’s 3rd District Republican primary details

Republican Primary, Sullivan’s 3rd District (3 seats)
Party	Candidate	Votes	%
Republican	Skip Rollins (Incumbent)	898	38.24
Republican	Steven D. Smith (Incumbent)	786	33.48
Republican	Walter Spilsbury (Incumbent)	664	28.28
Total votes		2,348	100.00

==== 4th District ====
Sullivan’s 4th District Democratic primary details

Democratic Primary, Sullivan’s 4th District (1 seat)
Party	Candidate	Votes	%
Democratic	Claudia Istel	Unopposed	
Total votes		400	100.0

Sullivan’s 4th District Republican primary details

Republican Primary, Sullivan’s 4th District (1 seat)
Party	Candidate	Votes	%
Republican	Judy Aron (Incumbent)	Unopposed	
Total votes		548	100.0

==== 5th District ====
Sullivan’s 5th District Democratic primary details

Democratic Primary, Sullivan’s 5th District (1 seat)
Party	Candidate	Votes	%
Democratic	Linda Tanner (Incumbent)	Unopposed	
Total votes		608	100.0

Sullivan’s 5th District Republican primary details

Republican Primary, Sullivan’s 5th District (1 seat)
Party	Candidate	Votes	%
Republican	George C. Grant	Unopposed	
Total votes		574	100.0

==== 6th District ====
Sullivan’s 6th District Republican primary details

Republican Primary, Sullivan’s 6th District (3 seats)
Party	Candidate	Votes	%
Republican	Wayne Hemingway	647	35.76
Republican	Robert W Merrill Jr.	433	23.91
Republican	Emily Sandblade	259	14.30
Republican	Tom Luther	241	13.31
Republican	Luke Diamond	231	12.76
Total votes		1,811	100.00

==== 7th District ====
Sullivan’s 7th District Democratic primary details

Democratic Primary, Sullivan’s 7th District (1 seat)
Party	Candidate	Votes	%
Write-in	Jenny Ramsey	Unopposed	
Total votes		744	100.0

Sullivan’s 7th District Republican primary details

Republican Primary, Sullivan’s 7th District (1 seat)
Party	Candidate	Votes	%
Republican	Margaret Drye (Incumbent)	Unopposed	
Total votes		1,308	100.0

==== 8th District ====
Sullivan’s 8th District Republican primary details

Republican Primary, Sullivan’s 8th District (2 seats)
Party	Candidate	Votes	%
Republican	Jonathan Stone (Incumbent)	1,467	51.29
Republican	Michael Aron	1,393	48.71
Total votes		2,860	100.00

== See also ==
- List of New Hampshire General Courts
