= Candice O'Neil =

American politician

Member of the New Hampshire House of Representatives from the Rockingham 29th district
- In office December 7, 2022 – December 3, 2024

Personal details
- Party: Democratic

Candice O'Neil is an American politician. She serves as a Democratic member for the Rockingham 29th district of the New Hampshire House of Representatives.
