= 2026 New Hampshire House of Representatives election =

- November 3, 2026

All 400 seats in the New Hampshire House of Representatives 201 seats needed for a majority
	Majority party	Minority party
Leader	Alexis Simpson	Sherman Packard
Party	Democratic	Republican
Leader's seat	Rockingham 33	Rockingham 16
Last election	178	222
Seats before	179	220
Seats after	292	107
Seat change	▲114	▼115
- Democratic Hold Democratic Gain; Republican Hold Republican Gain; Independent Gain
Speaker before election
Sherman Packard
Republican
Elected Speaker
TBD

The 2026 New Hampshire House of Representatives election was held on November 3, 2026, alongside the other 2026 United States elections. Voters elected all 400 members of the New Hampshire House of Representatives to serve a two-year term.

Democrats won their largest majority in the House in at least a century.

== Background ==
In the 2024 New Hampshire House of Representatives election, Republicans picked up 21 seats, expanding their narrow one-seat majority.

== Retirements ==
=== Republican ===
1. Belknap 3: Juliet Harvey-Bolia is retiring.
2. Belknap 4: Travis Toner is retiring.
3. Belknap 5: Steven Bogert and Sheri Minor are retiring.
4. Belknap 6: Russell Dumais is retiring.
5. Belknap 8: Douglas Trottier is retiring.
6. Carroll 3: Joseph Hamblen is retiring.
7. Carroll 6: Katy Peternel is retiring.
8. Carroll 8: Richard Brown is retiring to run for Carroll 3.
9. Coös 1: Sean Durkin and James Tierney Jr. are retiring.
10. Coös 5: Marc Tremblay is retiring.
11. Grafton 1: Darrell Louis is retiring.
12. Grafton 5: Rick Ladd is retiring.
13. Grafton 10: John Sellers is retiring.
14. Grafton 11: Lex Berezhny is retiring.
15. Hillsborough 1: Tim Mannion is retiring.
16. Hillsborough 2: Ted Gorski and Linda Gould are retiring.
17. Hillsborough 8: Kevin Scully is retiring.
18. Hillsborough 16: Larry Gagne is retiring.
19. Hillsborough 26: Brian Cole is retiring to run for U.S. House
20. Hillsborough 30: Jim Creighton is retiring to run for state senate and Riché Colcombe and Jim Fedolfi are retiring.
21. Hillsborough 38: Kimberly Rice is retiring.
22. Hillsborough 39: Mark Warden is retiring.
23. Hillsborough 42: Keith Ammon is retiring.
24. Merrimack 3: Bryan Morse is retiring.
25. Merrimack 10: John Leavitt is retiring.
26. Merrimack 14: Dan McGuire is retiring.
27. Merrimack 14: Carol McGuire is retiring.
28. Rockingham 2: Kevin Verville is retiring.
29. Rockingham 9: Vicki Wilson is retiring.
30. Rockingham 13: Phyllis Katsakiores and Katherine Prudhomme O'Brien are retiring.
31. Rockingham 16: Tom Dolan and Douglas Thomas are retiring.
32. Rockingham 25: Tanya Donnelly is retiring.
33. Strafford 2: Claudine Burnham is retiring.
34. Strafford 4: Len Turcotte is retiring.
35. Strafford 5: Thomas Kaczynski Jr. is retiring.
36. Strafford 8: Sam Farrington is retiring to run for Strafford 19.
37. Strafford 19: David Walker is retiring to run for Strafford 8 and Kelley Potenza is retiring.
38. Sullivan 4: Judy Aron is retiring.
39. Sullivan 8: Michael Aron is retiring.

=== Democratic ===
1. Carroll 1: Thomas Buco and Stephen Woodcock are retiring.
2. Carroll 2: Chris McAleer is retiring.
3. Carroll 7: Bobbi Boudman is retiring to run for state senate.
4. Cheshire 8: Lucius Parshall is retiring to run for Cheshire 16.
5. Cheshire 10: Barrett Faulkner is retiring.
6. Cheshire 13: Richard Ames is retiring.
7. Cheshire 13: James Gruber is retiring to run for Cheshire 9.
8. Grafton 14: George Sykes is retiring to run for Grafton county commission.
9. Grafton 15: Thomas Cormen is retiring to run for Grafton 17.
10. Grafton 17: Susan Almy is retiring.
11. Hillsborough 2: Loren Foxx is retiring.
12. Hillsborough 3: Paige Beauchemin is retiring to run for U.S. House and Marc Plamondon is retiring.
13. Hillsborough 4: Ray Newman and Sue Newman are retiring.
14. Hillsborough 6: Carry Spier is retiring.
15. Hillsborough 7: Alicia Gregg and Catherine Sofikitis are retiring.
16. Hillsborough 9: William Dolan is retiring.
17. Hillsborough 11: Laura Telerski is retiring to run for state senate.
18. Hillsborough 16: Dan Bergeron is retiring.
19. Hillsborough 17: Linda DiSilvestro and David Preece are retiring.
20. Hillsborough 19: Suzanne Chretien is retiring.
21. Hillsborough 21: Matthew Wilhelm is retiring.
22. Hillsborough 22: Patricia Cornell is retiring.
23. Hillsborough 24: Christopher Herbert is retiring.
24. Hillsborough 41: Karen Hegner is retiring.
25. Hillsborough 43: Peter Petrigno is retiring.
26. Merrimack 18: James MacKay is retiring.
27. Merrimack 20: Eric Gallager is retiring.
28. Merrimack 22: James Roesener is retiring.
29. Merrimack 23: Merryl Gibbs is retiring.
30. Merrimack 28: Jim Snodgrass is retiring.
31. Merrimack 30: Gary Woods is retiring.
32. Rockingham 10: Toni Weinstein is retiring.
33. Rockingham 11: Gaby Grossman is retiring.
34. Rockingham 21: Jennifer Mandelbaum is retiring.
35. Rockingham 29: Erica de Vries, Mike Edgar, and Chris Muns are retiring.
36. Rockingham 37: David Meuse is retiring.
37. Rockingham 39: Ned Raynolds is retiring.
38. Strafford 4: Heath Howard is retiring to run for Strafford county commission (Note: Howard previously ran for U.S. House) and Cassandra Levesque is retiring.
39. Strafford 9: Amy Malone is retiring.
40. Strafford 10: Marjorie Smith is retiring.
41. Strafford 15: Alice Wade is retiring to run for Strafford 21.
42. Strafford 19: John Larochelle is retiring to run for Strafford 7.
43. Strafford 21: Luz Bay is retiring to run for Executive Council.
44. Sullivan 2: William Palmer is retiring.

=== Independent ===
1. Strafford 7: Aidan Ankarberg is retiring.

== Vacancies ==
=== Republican ===
1. Belknap 2: Matthew Lunney resigned September 23, 2025.
2. Belknap 6: Harry Bean died February 14, 2026.
3. Coös 6: Michael Murphy resigned May 22, 2026.
4. Hillsborough 1: Sandra Panek resigned March 1, 2026.
5. Hillsborough 29: Sheila Seidel resigned October 31, 2025.
6. Hillsborough 39: Jonathan Morton resigned July 15, 2026.
7. Rockingham 5: Michael Vose resigned August 27, 2026.
8. Rockingham 25: Fred Doucette resigned March 10, 2026 to become the FEMA Region 1 administrator.

=== Democratic ===
1. Belknap 5: Charlie St. Clair died August 22, 2026.
2. Cheshire 1: Dylan Germana resigned January 30, 2026 following a residency inquiry.
3. Grafton 9: Thomas Oppel resigned August 3, 2026.
4. Hillsborough 6: Suzanne Vail resigned June 15, 2026.
5. Hillsborough 24: Donald Bouchard resigned July 21, 2025.
6. Hillsborough 40: Suraj Budathoki resigned May 28, 2026.
7. Hillsborough 41: Tim Hartnett resigned July 30, 2026.
8. Rockingham 11: Linda Haskins resigned July 3, 2026.
9. Rockingham 22: Kate Murray resigned August 3, 2026.
10. Rockingham 24: Jaci Grote resigned June 15, 2026.

== Incumbents defeated ==
=== In primary elections ===
==== Republican ====
1. Carroll 5: Jonathan Smith lost renomination to Steven Brown.
2. Carroll 8: Brian Taylor lost renomination to Tammy Garthwaite and Colin Mitchell.
3. Hillsborough 13: Jeremy Slottje lost renomination to Tom Trost.
4. Hillsborough 38: Ralph Boehm lost renomination to Adam Haverstock and Ted Trost.
5. Merrimack 3: Ernesto Gonzalez lost renomination to Werner Horn and Mike Visconti.
6. Rockingham 9: Donald Selby lost renomination to Matthew Brooks and Kevin Major.
7. Rockingham 13: David Milz and Stephen Pearson lost renomination to Michael Appleton, Brandon Bach, Brian Chirichiello, and Anthony Henry.
8. Rockingham 30: Matt Sabourin dit Choinière lost renomination to Jason Janvrin.
9. Strafford 1: Susan DeLemus lost renomination to Packy Campbell and Andy Dow.

==== Democratic ====
1. Strafford 12: John Stone lost renomination to Will Hurley.

== Predictions ==
Source	Ranking	As of
Sabato's Crystal Ball	Lean D (flip)	October 16, 2026
State Navigate	Likely D (flip)	October 24, 2026

== Generic ballot polling ==
Poll source	Date(s) administered	Sample size (Note: Key: A – all adults RV – registered voters LV – likely voters V – unclear)	Margin of error	Republican	Democratic	Both	Other	Undecided
University of New Hampshire	September 17–21, 2026	1,418 (LV)	± 2.6%	39%	49%	7%	0%	5%
University of New Hampshire	October 27-31, 2026	2,040 (LV)	± 2.2%	38%	51%	6%	1%	4%

== Summary of results by district ==
† - Incumbent not seeking re-election

District		Incumbent	Party	District		Elected Representative	Party
Belknap	1	Tom Ploszaj	Rep	Belknap	1	Amber Schaefer	
Belknap	2	Matthew Coker	Rep	Belknap	2	Matthew Coker	
Belknap	2	Matthew Lunney	Rep	Belknap	2	Seth Wheeler	
Belknap	3	Juliet Harvey-Bolia	Rep	Belknap	3	William Lawrence Jr.	
Belknap	4	Travis Toner	Rep	Belknap	4	Kevin Nugent Jr.	Rep
Belknap	5	Mike Bordes	Rep	Belknap	5	Mike Bordes	
Belknap	5	Sheri Minor	Rep	Belknap	5	Marcia Hayward	
Belknap	5	Steven Bogert	Rep	Belknap	5	Eric Hoffman	
Belknap	5	Charlie St. Clair	Dem	Belknap	5	Denise Riley	
Belknap	6	Harry Bean	Rep	Belknap	6	Bob McLean	
Belknap	6	Russell Dumais	Rep	Belknap	6	Lisa Rivard	
Belknap	6	David Nagel	Dem (Note: Nagel switched parties in February 2026)	Belknap	6	David Nagel	
Belknap	6	Glen Aldrich	Rep	Belknap	6	Jade Wood	
Belknap	7	Peter Varney	Rep	Belknap	7	Peter Varney	Rep
Belknap	7	Paul Terry	Rep	Belknap	7	Barbara Comtois	Rep
Belknap	7	Barbara Comtois	Rep	Belknap	7	Paul Terry	Rep
Belknap	8	Douglas Trottier	Rep	Belknap	8	Lisa Freeman	Rep
Belknap	8	Lisa Freeman	Rep	Belknap	8	Cameron Thompson	Rep
Carroll	1	Stephen Woodcock	Dem	Carroll	1	Benjamin Colbath	Dem
Carroll	1	David Paige	Dem	Carroll	1	David Paige	Dem
Carroll	1	Thomas Buco	Dem	Carroll	1	Ellin Leonard	Dem
Carroll	2	Anita Burroughs	Dem	Carroll	2	Anita Burroughs	Dem
Carroll	2	Chris McAleer	Dem	Carroll	2	Adam Heard	Dem
Carroll	3	Karel Crawford	Rep	Carroll	3	Karel Crawford	
Carroll	3	Joseph Hamblen	Rep	Carroll	3	Todd Milliken	
Carroll	4	Lino Avellani	Rep	Carroll	4	Lino Avellani	
Carroll	4	Mike Belcher	Rep	Carroll	4	Mike Belcher	
Carroll	5	Jonathan Smith	Rep	Carroll	5	Steven Brown	
Carroll	6	Katy Peternel	Rep	Carroll	6	Deirdre McEachern	
Carroll	6	John MacDonald	Rep	Carroll	6	John MacDonald	
Carroll	7	Bobbi Boudman	Dem	Carroll	7	Dale Fincher	Rep
Carroll	8	Richard Brown	Rep	Carroll	8	George Randell	
Carroll	8	Brian R. Taylor	Rep	Carroll	8	Colin Mitchell	
Cheshire	1	Dylan Germana	Dem	Cheshire	1	Dylan Germana	Dem
Cheshire	2	Dru Fox	Dem	Cheshire	2	Dru Fox	Dem
Cheshire	3	Philip Jones	Dem	Cheshire	3	Philip Jones	Dem
Cheshire	4	Jodi Newell	Dem	Cheshire	4	Jodi Newell	Dem
Cheshire	5	Lucy Weber	Dem	Cheshire	5	Lucy Weber	Dem
Cheshire	6	Paul Berch	Dem	Cheshire	6	Cathryn Harvey	Dem
Cheshire	6	Cathryn Harvey	Dem	Cheshire	6	Paul Berch	Dem
Cheshire	7	Terri O'Rorke	Dem	Cheshire	7	Terri O'Rorke	Dem
Cheshire	8	Lucius Parshall	Dem	Cheshire	8	Christine Parshall	Dem
Cheshire	9	Rich Nalevanko	Rep	Cheshire	9	James Gruber	
Cheshire	10	Barrett Faulkner	Dem	Cheshire	10	Alan Gross	Dem
Cheshire	10	Sly Karasinski	Rep	Cheshire	10	Steve Russell	Dem
Cheshire	11	Denis Murphy	Rep	Cheshire	11	Lindseigh Picard	
Cheshire	12	Dick Thackston	Rep	Cheshire	12	Kristan Tilton	
Cheshire	13	Richard Ames	Dem	Cheshire	13	Tom Ahlborn-Hsu	Dem
Cheshire	14	John B. Hunt	Rep	Cheshire	14	John B. Hunt	
Cheshire	15	Samantha Jacobs	Dem	Cheshire	15	Samantha Jacobs	Dem
Cheshire	15	Nicholas Germana	Dem	Cheshire	15	Nicholas Germana	Dem
Cheshire	16	James Gruber	Dem	Cheshire	16	Lucius Parshall	Dem
Cheshire	17	Jennifer Rhodes	Rep	Cheshire	17	Jennie Gomarlo	
Cheshire	18	Jim Qualey	Rep	Cheshire	18	Jim Qualey	
Cheshire	18	Rita Mattson	Rep	Cheshire	18	Rita Mattson	
Coös	1	Sean Durkin	Rep	Coös	1	Sam Hoehn	
Coös	1	James Tierney Jr.	Rep	Coös	1	Amy Norris	
Coös	2	Arnold Davis	Rep	Coös	2	Arnold Davis	
Coös	3	Mike Ouellet	Rep	Coös	3	Mike Ouellet	Rep
Coös	4	Seth King	Rep	Coös	4	Seth King	Rep
Coös	5	Marc Tremblay	Rep	Coös	5	Mark Evans	
Coös	5	Pete Morency	Rep	Coös	5	Pete Morency	
Coös	6	Michael Murphy	Rep	Coös	6	Richard Umiker	
Coös	7	Lori Korzen	Rep	Coös	7	Corinne Cascadden	
Grafton	1	Joseph Barton	Rep	Grafton	1	Timothy Egan	
Grafton	1	Darrell Louis	Rep	Grafton	1	Linda Massimilla	
Grafton	1	Calvin Beaulier	Rep	Grafton	1	Andrew Dorsett	
Grafton	2	Jared Sullivan	Dem	Grafton	2	Jared Sullivan	Dem
Grafton	3	Jerry Stringham	Dem	Grafton	3	Jerry Stringham	Dem
Grafton	4	Heather Baldwin	Dem	Grafton	4	Heather Baldwin	Dem
Grafton	5	Rick Ladd	Rep	Grafton	5	Greg Mathieson	
Grafton	5	Marie Louise Bjelobrk	Rep	Grafton	5	Marie Louise Bjelobrk	
Grafton	6	Linda Franz	Rep	Grafton	6	Paul Goundrey	Dem
Grafton	7	Janet Lucas	Dem	Grafton	7	Janet Lucas	Dem
Grafton	8	Sallie Fellows	Dem	Grafton	8	Peter Lovett	Dem
Grafton	8	Peter Lovett	Dem	Grafton	8	Sallie Fellows	Dem
Grafton	8	Bill Bolton	Dem	Grafton	8	Bill Bolton	Dem
Grafton	9	Thomas Oppel	Dem	Grafton	9	Ella Barrett	Dem
Grafton	10	John Sellers	Rep	Grafton	10	Marc Bourassa	
Grafton	11	Lex Berezhny	Rep	Grafton	11	Jake Abuhav	
Grafton	12	Mary Hakken-Phillips	Dem	Grafton	12	Mary Hakken-Phillips	Dem
Grafton	12	Russell Muirhead	Dem	Grafton	12	Russell Muirhead	Dem
Grafton	12	Ellen Rockmore	Dem	Grafton	12	Ellen Rockmore	Dem
Grafton	12	Terry Spahr	Dem	Grafton	12	Terry Spahr	Dem
Grafton	13	Laurel Stavis	Dem	Grafton	13	Laurel Stavis	Dem
Grafton	14	George Sykes	Dem	Grafton	14	Kathryn Brennan	Dem
Grafton	15	Thomas H. Cormen	Dem	Grafton	15	Zoe Hill	Dem
Grafton	16	David Fracht	Dem	Grafton	16	David Fracht	Dem
Grafton	17	Susan Almy	Dem	Grafton	17	Thomas Cormen	Dem
Grafton	18	Donald McFarlane	Rep	Grafton	18	Marko Kloos	Dem
Hillsborough	1	Jeffrey Tenczar	Rep	Hillsborough	1	Jeffrey Tenczar	Rep
Hillsborough	1	Sandra Panek	Rep	Hillsborough	1	Tom Mannion	Rep
Hillsborough	1	Tom Mannion	Rep	Hillsborough	1	Deborah Kruzel	Rep
Hillsborough	1	Tim Mannion	Rep	Hillsborough	1	Diane Rogers	Rep
Hillsborough	2	Catherine Rombeau	Dem	Hillsborough	2	Catherine Rombeau	Dem
Hillsborough	2	Brian Labrie	Rep	Hillsborough	2	Jeffrey Kerr	Dem
Hillsborough	2	Kristin Noble	Rep	Hillsborough	2	John Fitzgerald	Dem
Hillsborough	2	Ted Gorski	Rep	Hillsborough	2	Todd Fahey	Dem
Hillsborough	2	John Schneller	Rep	Hillsborough	2	Geoffrey Wellington	Dem
Hillsborough	2	Loren Foxx	Dem	Hillsborough	2	Ryan Nugent	Dem
Hillsborough	2	Linda Gould	Rep	Hillsborough	2	Sheila Quick	Dem
Hillsborough	3	Paige Beauchemin	Dem	Hillsborough	3	Michael Joseph	Dem
Hillsborough	3	Fred Davis Jr.	Dem	Hillsborough	3	Suzanne Beaulieu	Dem
Hillsborough	3	Marc Plamondon	Dem	Hillsborough	3	Fred Davis Jr.	Dem
Hillsborough	4	Sue Newman	Dem	Hillsborough	4	Linda Ryan	Dem
Hillsborough	4	Linda Ryan	Dem	Hillsborough	4	Camille Pattison	Dem
Hillsborough	4	Ray Newman	Dem	Hillsborough	4	Renae Lias	Dem
Hillsborough	5	Heather Raymond	Dem	Hillsborough	5	Heather Raymond	Dem
Hillsborough	5	Susan Elberger	Dem	Hillsborough	5	Susan Elberger	Dem
Hillsborough	5	Dale Swanson	Dem	Hillsborough	5	Dale Swanson	Dem
Hillsborough	6	Lee Ann Kluger	Dem	Hillsborough	6	Adam Thompson	Dem
Hillsborough	6	Carry Spier	Dem	Hillsborough	6	Lee Ann Kluger	Dem
Hillsborough	6	Suzanne Vail	Dem	Hillsborough	6	Michele Roussel Buckley	Dem
Hillsborough	7	Alicia Gregg	Dem	Hillsborough	7	Jim Mahoney	Dem
Hillsborough	7	Louis Juris	Dem	Hillsborough	7	Charlene Pedersen	Dem
Hillsborough	7	Catherine Sofikitis	Dem	Hillsborough	7	Louis Juris	Dem
Hillsborough	8	Kevin Scully	Rep	Hillsborough	8	Christal Lloyd	Dem
Hillsborough	8	Christal Lloyd	Dem	Hillsborough	8	Fran Nutter-Upham	Dem
Hillsborough	8	Efstathia Booras	Dem	Hillsborough	8	Efstathia Booras	Dem
Hillsborough	9	William Dolan	Dem	Hillsborough	9	Santosh Salvi	Dem
Hillsborough	9	Santosh Salvi	Dem	Hillsborough	9	Rich Green	Dem
Hillsborough	9	Sanjeev Manohar	Dem	Hillsborough	9	Sanjeev Manohar	Dem
Hillsborough	10	Linda Harriott-Gathright	Dem	Hillsborough	10	Samantha O'Loughlin	Dem
Hillsborough	10	Marty Jack	Dem	Hillsborough	10	Marty Jack	Dem
Hillsborough	10	Bill Ohm	Rep	Hillsborough	10	Linda Harriott-Gathright	Dem
Hillsborough	11	Manoj Chourasia	Dem	Hillsborough	11	Will Darby	Dem
Hillsborough	11	Will Darby	Dem	Hillsborough	11	Manoj Chourasia	Dem
Hillsborough	11	Laura Telerski	Dem	Hillsborough	11	Arya Shams	Dem
Hillsborough	12	Maureen Mooney	Rep	Hillsborough	12	Rosemarie Rung	Dem
Hillsborough	12	Julie Miles	Rep	Hillsborough	12	Nancy Murphy	Dem
Hillsborough	12	Jeanine Notter	Rep	Hillsborough	12	Wendy Thomas	Dem
Hillsborough	12	Adam Presa	Rep	Hillsborough	12	Heather Robitaille	Dem
Hillsborough	12	Nancy Murphy	Dem	Hillsborough	12	Matthew Brown	Dem
Hillsborough	12	William Boyd III	Rep	Hillsborough	12	Mary Beth Raven	Dem
Hillsborough	12	Rosemarie Rung	Dem	Hillsborough	12	Marc Nozell	Dem
Hillsborough	12	Wendy Thomas	Dem	Hillsborough	12	Rebecca Boutin	Dem
Hillsborough	13	Cathy Kenny	Rep	Hillsborough	13	Cathy Kenny	
Hillsborough	13	Dillon Dumont	Rep	Hillsborough	13	Dillon Dumont	
Hillsborough	13	Andrew Prout	Rep	Hillsborough	13	Jim Caron	
Hillsborough	13	Jordan Ulery	Rep	Hillsborough	13	Jordan Ulery	
Hillsborough	13	Robert Wherry	Rep	Hillsborough	13	Kate Messner	
Hillsborough	13	Jeremy Slottje	Rep	Hillsborough	13	Tom Trost	
Hillsborough	14	Richard Lascelles	Rep	Hillsborough	14	Richard Lascelles	
Hillsborough	14	Raymond Peeples	Rep	Hillsborough	14	Raymond Peeples	
Hillsborough	15	Mark McLean	Rep	Hillsborough	15	Michael Farley	
Hillsborough	15	Mark Proulx	Rep	Hillsborough	15	Michael Fitzell	
Hillsborough	16	Larry Gagne	Rep	Hillsborough	16	Benjamin Baroody	
Hillsborough	16	Dan Bergeron	Dem	Hillsborough	16	Maxine Mosley	
Hillsborough	17	Linda DiSilvestro	Dem	Hillsborough	17	Rob Fox	
Hillsborough	17	David Preece	Dem	Hillsborough	17	Sean Parr	
Hillsborough	18	Jessica Grill	Dem	Hillsborough	18	Jessica Grill	
Hillsborough	18	Steven Kesselring	Rep	Hillsborough	18	Jim Normand	
Hillsborough	19	Matt Drew	Rep	Hillsborough	19	Jane Beaulieu	
Hillsborough	19	Suzanne Chretien	Dem	Hillsborough	19	Chrissy Simonds	
Hillsborough	20	Alissandra Murray	Dem	Hillsborough	20	Alissandra Murray	
Hillsborough	20	Pierre Dupont	Rep	Hillsborough	20	Pauline Martineau	
Hillsborough	21	Christine Seibert	Dem	Hillsborough	21	Christine Seibert	
Hillsborough	21	Matthew Wilhelm	Dem	Hillsborough	21	Jeffrey Goley	
Hillsborough	22	Patricia Cornell	Dem	Hillsborough	22	Greg Erskine	
Hillsborough	22	Nicole Leapley	Dem	Hillsborough	22	Nicole Leapley	
Hillsborough	23	Mary Ngwanda Georges	Dem	Hillsborough	23	Mary Ngwanda Georges	
Hillsborough	23	Jean Jeudy	Dem	Hillsborough	23	Jean Jeudy	
Hillsborough	24	Christopher Herbert	Dem	Hillsborough	24	Frank Anthony	
Hillsborough	24	Donald Bouchard	Dem	Hillsborough	24	Jessica Margeson	
Hillsborough	25	Kathleen Paquette	Rep	Hillsborough	25	Heather Deiner	
Hillsborough	25	Kathy Staub	Dem	Hillsborough	25	Kathy Staub	
Hillsborough	26	Brian Cole †	Rep	Hillsborough	26	Mary Freitas	
Hillsborough	26	Patrick Long	Dem	Hillsborough	26	Patrick Long	
Hillsborough	27	Mary Murphy	Rep	Hillsborough	27	Mary Murphy	
Hillsborough	28	Keith Erf	Rep	Hillsborough	28	Keith Erf	
Hillsborough	28	Travis Corcoran	Rep	Hillsborough	28	Travis Corcoran	
Hillsborough	29	Joe Alexander	Rep	Hillsborough	29	Karyn Battey	
Hillsborough	29	Sherri Reinfurt	Rep	Hillsborough	29	Christopher Calhoun	
Hillsborough	29	Sheila Seidel	Rep	Hillsborough	29	Judi Lanza	
Hillsborough	29	Henry Giasson	Rep	Hillsborough	29	Marie Morgan	
Hillsborough	30	Jim Creighton	Rep	Hillsborough	30	W. Gordon Allen	
Hillsborough	30	Riché Colcombe	Rep	Hillsborough	30	Janet McEwen	
Hillsborough	30	Jim Fedolfi	Rep	Hillsborough	30	Tim Morehouse	
Hillsborough	31	Molly Howard		Hillsborough	31	Molly Howard	
Hillsborough	32	Diane Kelley	Rep	Hillsborough	32	Diane Kelley	
Hillsborough	32	Jim Kofalt	Rep	Hillsborough	32	Jim Kofalt	
Hillsborough	32	Shane Sirois	Rep	Hillsborough	32	Shane Sirois	
Hillsborough	33	Peter Leishman	Dem	Hillsborough	33	Peter Leishman	
Hillsborough	33	Jonah Wheeler	Dem	Hillsborough	33	Jonah Wheeler	
Hillsborough	34	Stephanie Grund	Dem	Hillsborough	34	Stephanie Grund	
Hillsborough	34	Daniel LeClerc	Dem	Hillsborough	34	Daniel LeClerc	
Hillsborough	34	Daniel Veilleux	Dem	Hillsborough	34	Daniel Veilleux	
Hillsborough	35	Liz Barbour	Rep	Hillsborough	35	Ben Ming	
Hillsborough	35	Kat McGhee	Dem	Hillsborough	35	Kat McGhee	
Hillsborough	36	Diane Pauer	Rep	Hillsborough	36	Mike Pellerito	
Hillsborough	36	John Suiter	Rep	Hillsborough	36	Steve Spratt	
Hillsborough	37	Megan Murray	Dem	Hillsborough	37	Megan Murray	
Hillsborough	38	Kimberly Rice	Rep	Hillsborough	38	Heidi Jakoby	
Hillsborough	38	Ralph Boehm	Rep	Hillsborough	38	Adam Haverstock	
Hillsborough	39	Mark Warden	Rep	Hillsborough	39	Ellen Boudreau	
Hillsborough	39	Jonathan Morton	Rep	Hillsborough	39	Thomas Katsiantonis	
Hillsborough	40	Erin Kerwin	Dem	Hillsborough	40	Erin Kerwin	
Hillsborough	40	Mark MacKenzie	Dem	Hillsborough	40	Mark MacKenzie	
Hillsborough	40	Trinidad Tellez	Dem	Hillsborough	40	Trinidad Tellez	
Hillsborough	40	Suraj Budathoki	Dem	Hillsborough	40	Robert Richard-Snipes	
Hillsborough	41	Tim Hartnett	Dem	Hillsborough	41	Bishwa Bahadur Shah	
Hillsborough	41	Karen Hegner	Dem	Hillsborough	41	Tom Stewart	
Hillsborough	41	Lily Foss	Dem	Hillsborough	41	Lily Foss	
Hillsborough	42	Keith Ammon	Rep	Hillsborough	42	Teri Harkins	
Hillsborough	42	Lisa Post	Rep	Hillsborough	42	Lee Nyquist	
Hillsborough	42	Gerald Griffin	Rep	Hillsborough	42	Peter Ryder	
Hillsborough	43	Peter Petrigno	Dem	Hillsborough	43	Ethan Aho	
Hillsborough	43	Vanessa Sheehan	Rep	Hillsborough	43	Claire Holston	
Hillsborough	43	Gary Daniels	Rep	Hillsborough	43	Maria Perez	
Hillsborough	43	Paul Dargie	Dem	Hillsborough	43	Paul Dargie	
Hillsborough	44	Lisa Mazur	Rep	Hillsborough	44	Lisa Mazur	
Hillsborough	44	Ross Berry	Rep	Hillsborough	44	Chris Conroy	
Hillsborough	45	Jack Flanagan	Rep	Hillsborough	45	Jerry Roche	
Merrimack	1	Ricky Devoid	Rep	Merrimack	1	Lorrie Carey	
Merrimack	2	Gregory Hill	Rep	Merrimack	2	Gregory Hill	
Merrimack	3	Bryan Morse	Rep	Merrimack	3	Scott Burns	
Merrimack	3	Ernesto Gonzalez	Rep	Merrimack	3	Vivian Hall	
Merrimack	4	Jose Cambrils	Rep	Merrimack	4	Cody York	
Merrimack	4	Michael Moffett	Rep	Merrimack	4	Michael Moffett	
Merrimack	5	Louise Andrus	Rep	Merrimack	5	Lorna Carlisle	
Merrimack	5	Deborah Aylward	Rep	Merrimack	5	Thomas Ware	
Merrimack	6	Tom Schamberg	Dem	Merrimack	6	Tom Schamberg	
Merrimack	7	Karen Ebel	Dem	Merrimack	7	Karen Ebel	
Merrimack	7	Gregory Sargent	Dem	Merrimack	7	Gregory Sargent	
Merrimack	8	Tony Caplan	Dem	Merrimack	8	Tony Caplan	
Merrimack	8	Eileen Kelly	Dem	Merrimack	8	Eileen Kelly	
Merrimack	8	Stephanie Payeur	Dem	Merrimack	8	Stephanie Payeur	
Merrimack	9	Eleana Colby	Dem	Merrimack	9	Eleana Colby	
Merrimack	9	Muriel Hall	Dem	Merrimack	9	Muriel Hall	
Merrimack	9	David Luneau	Dem	Merrimack	9	David Luneau	
Merrimack	9	James Newsom	Dem	Merrimack	9	James Newsom	
Merrimack	10	Thomas Walsh	Rep	Merrimack	10	Thomas Walsh	
Merrimack	10	John Leavitt	Rep	Merrimack	10	Lucas Coriaty	
Merrimack	10	Stephen Boyd	Rep	Merrimack	10	William Lynch	
Merrimack	10	Yury Polozov	Rep	Merrimack	10	Germano Martins	
Merrimack	11	Matthew Pitaro	Rep	Merrimack	11	Alisson Turcotte	
Merrimack	12	Peter Mehegan	Rep	Merrimack	12	Mariana Beer	
Merrimack	12	Brian Seaworth	Rep	Merrimack	12	Kenneth Nivison	
Merrimack	13	Clayton Wood	Rep	Merrimack	13	Clayton Wood	
Merrimack	13	Cyril Aures	Rep	Merrimack	13	Becky Berk	
Merrimack	14	Dan McGuire	Rep	Merrimack	14	Gary Matteson	
Merrimack	15	Tracy Bricchi	Dem	Merrimack	15	Tracy Bricchi	
Merrimack	16	Connie Lane	Dem	Merrimack	16	Connie Lane	
Merrimack	17	Beth Richards	Dem	Merrimack	17	Beth Richards	
Merrimack	18	James MacKay	Dem	Merrimack	18	Lisa Beaudoin	
Merrimack	19	Mary Jane Wallner	Dem	Merrimack	19	Mary Jane Wallner	
Merrimack	20	Eric Gallager	Dem	Merrimack	20	Nathan Giffard	
Merrimack	21	Timothy Soucy	Dem	Merrimack	21	Timothy Soucy	
Merrimack	22	James Leon Roesener	Dem	Merrimack	22	Alison Murphy	
Merrimack	23	Merryl Gibbs	Dem	Merrimack	23	Kristopher Levesque	
Merrimack	24	Matthew Hicks	Dem	Merrimack	24	Matthew Hicks	
Merrimack	25	James Thibualt	Rep	Merrimack	25	James Thibualt	
Merrimack	26	Alvin See	Rep	Merrimack	26	Harold Tuttle	
Merrimack	27	Carol McGuire	Rep	Merrimack	27	Phillip Walker	
Merrimack	27	Ray Plante	Rep	Merrimack	27	Vanessa Poulin	
Merrimack	28	Jim Snodgrass	Dem	Merrimack	28	Lisa Brown	
Merrimack	29	Kris Schultz	Dem	Merrimack	29	Kris Schultz	
Merrimack	30	Gary Woods	Dem	Merrimack	30	Jason Quinno	
Rockingham	1	Scott Bryer	Rep	Rockingham	1	Donna Danis	
Rockingham	1	James Guzofski	Rep	Rockingham	1	Hal Rafter	
Rockingham	1	Paul Tudor	Rep	Rockingham	1	Pamela Sanderson	
Rockingham	2	Jason Osborne	Rep	Rockingham	2	Jason Osborne	Dem
Rockingham	2	James Spillane	Rep	Rockingham	2	James Spillane	
Rockingham	2	Kevin Verville	Rep	Rockingham	2	Will Huebner	
Rockingham	3	Oliver Ford	Rep	Rockingham	3	Mary Ford	
Rockingham	4	Mike Drago	Rep	Rockingham	4	Mike Drago	
Rockingham	4	Brian Nadeau	Rep	Rockingham	4	Brian Nadeau	
Rockingham	4	Cindy Bennett	Rep	Rockingham	4	Cindy Bennett	
Rockingham	5	Mark Vallone	Dem	Rockingham	5	Mark Vallone	
Rockingham	5	Michael Vose	Rep	Rockingham	5	John Scully	
Rockingham	6	Eric Turer	Dem	Rockingham	6	Eric Turer	
Rockingham	7	Laurence Miner	Rep	Rockingham	7	Laurence Miner	
Rockingham	8	Sayra DeVito	Rep	Rockingham	8	Sayra DeVito	
Rockingham	9	Donald Selby	Rep	Rockingham	9	Matthew Brooks	
Rockingham	9	Vicki Wilson	Rep	Rockingham	9	Kevin Major	
Rockingham	10	Michael Cahill	Dem	Rockingham	10	Michael Cahill	
Rockingham	10	Ellen Read	Dem	Rockingham	10	Ellen Read	
Rockingham	10	Toni Weinstein	Dem	Rockingham	10	Charlotte DiLorenzo	
Rockingham	11	Julie Gilman	Dem	Rockingham	11	Julie Gilman	
Rockingham	11	Mark Paige	Dem	Rockingham	11	Mark Paige	
Rockingham	11	Gaby Grossman	Dem	Rockingham	11	Enna Grazier	
Rockingham	11	Linda Haskins	Dem	Rockingham	11	Steven Jones	
Rockingham	12	Allison Knab	Dem	Rockingham	12	Allison Knab	
Rockingham	12	Zoe Manos	Dem	Rockingham	12	Zoe Manos	
Rockingham	13	David Love	Rep	Rockingham	13	Haley Carreau	
Rockingham	13	Jodi Nelson	Rep	Rockingham	13	Jamie Carreau	
Rockingham	13	Erica Layon	Rep	Rockingham	13	Matt Glavin	
Rockingham	13	Phyllis Katsakiores	Rep	Rockingham	13	Hollie Hesse	
Rockingham	13	Charles Foote	Rep	Rockingham	13	Charles Foote	
Rockingham	13	John Potucek	Rep	Rockingham	13	Jim Marshall	
Rockingham	13	Katherine Prudhomme O'Brien	Rep	Rockingham	13	David Provencher	
Rockingham	13	Stephen Pearson	Rep	Rockingham	13	Kristine Trow	
Rockingham	13	David Milz	Rep	Rockingham	13	Paula Mahon d'Entremont	
Rockingham	13	Richard Tripp	Rep	Rockingham	13	Brian Chirichiello	
Rockingham	14	Kenneth Weyler	Rep	Rockingham	14	Kenneth Weyler	
Rockingham	14	Pam Brown	Rep	Rockingham	14	Paul Paone	
Rockingham	15	Joseph Guthrie	Rep	Rockingham	15	Joseph Guthrie	
Rockingham	15	Lilli Walsh	Rep	Rockingham	15	Lilli Walsh	
Rockingham	16	Kristine Perez	Rep	Rockingham	16	Ted Combes	
Rockingham	16	David Lundgren	Rep	Rockingham	16	David Lundgren	
Rockingham	16	Tom Dolan	Rep	Rockingham	16	Jane Cooper	
Rockingham	16	Ron Dunn	Rep	Rockingham	16	Bob Cote	
Rockingham	16	Douglas Thomas	Rep	Rockingham	16	Isaac Fernandez	
Rockingham	16	Sherman Packard	Rep	Rockingham	16	Michela Hites	
Rockingham	16	Wayne MacDonald	Rep	Rockingham	16	Paul Skudlarek	
Rockingham	17	Charles McMahon	Rep	Rockingham	17	Charles McMahon	
Rockingham	17	Katelyn Kuttab	Rep	Rockingham	17	Katelyn Kuttab	
Rockingham	17	Daniel Popovici-Muller	Rep	Rockingham	17	Daniel Popovici-Muller	
Rockingham	17	Robert Lynn	Rep	Rockingham	17	Robert Lynn	
Rockingham	18	Debra DeSimone	Rep	Rockingham	18	Debra DeSimone	
Rockingham	18	Jay Markell	Rep	Rockingham	18	Jay Markell	
Rockingham	19	Susan Porcelli	Rep	Rockingham	19	Susan Porcelli	
Rockingham	20	Robert Harb	Rep	Rockingham	20	Robert Harb	
Rockingham	20	Charles Melvin	Rep	Rockingham	20	Rick Faulconer	
Rockingham	20	James Summers	Rep	Rockingham	20	James Summers	
Rockingham	21	Jennifer Mandelbaum	Dem	Rockingham	21	Anna Howard	
Rockingham	22	Kate Murray	Dem	Rockingham	22	Rebecca Audet	
Rockingham	23	Jim Maggiore	Dem	Rockingham	23	Jim Maggiore	
Rockingham	24	Jaci Grote	Dem	Rockingham	24	Michael Moody	
Rockingham	24	Dennis Malloy	Dem	Rockingham	24	Dennis Malloy	
Rockingham	25	Joseph Sweeney	Rep	Rockingham	25	Joseph Sweeney	
Rockingham	25	Fred Doucette	Rep	Rockingham	25	Donna Loranger	
Rockingham	25	Lorie Ball	Rep	Rockingham	25	Lorie Ball	
Rockingham	25	Tanya Donnelly	Rep	Rockingham	25	George Kassas	
Rockingham	25	John Janigian	Rep	Rockingham	25	John Janigian	
Rockingham	25	John Sytek	Rep	Rockingham	25	John Sytek	
Rockingham	25	Valerie McDonnell	Rep	Rockingham	25	Valerie McDonnell	
Rockingham	25	Susan Vandecasteele	Rep	Rockingham	25	Susan Vandecasteele	
Rockingham	25	Dennis Mannion	Rep	Rockingham	25	Dennis Mannion	
Rockingham	26	Buzz Scherr	Dem	Rockingham	26	Buzz Scherr	
Rockingham	27	Gerry Ward	Dem	Rockingham	27	Gerry Ward	
Rockingham	28	Carrie Sorensen	Dem	Rockingham	28	Carrie Sorensen	
Rockingham	29	Chris Muns	Dem	Rockingham	29	Ward Galanis	
Rockingham	29	Nicholas Bridle	Rep	Rockingham	29	Rebecca LaPierre	
Rockingham	29	Mike Edgar	Dem	Rockingham	29	Molly McCoy	
Rockingham	29	Erica de Vries	Dem	Rockingham	29	Nathan Riggs	
Rockingham	30	Aboul Khan	Rep	Rockingham	30	Aboul Khan	
Rockingham	30	Matt Sabourin	Rep	Rockingham	30	Jason Janvrin	
Rockingham	31	Jess Edwards	Rep	Rockingham	31	Jess Edwards	
Rockingham	31	Terry Roy	Rep	Rockingham	31	Terry Roy	
Rockingham	32	Melissa Litchfield	Rep	Rockingham	32	Melissa Litchfield	
Rockingham	33	Alexis Simpson	Dem	Rockingham	33	Alexis Simpson	
Rockingham	34	Mark Pearson	Rep	Rockingham	34	Mark Pearson	
Rockingham	35	Julius Soti	Rep	Rockingham	35	Michelle Stith	
Rockingham	36	JD Bernardy	Rep	Rockingham	36	JD Bernardy	
Rockingham	37	David Meuse	Dem	Rockingham	37	Kate Cook	
Rockingham	38	Peggy Balboni	Dem	Rockingham	38	Peggy Balboni	
Rockingham	39	Ned Raynolds	Dem	Rockingham	39	Barbara Ward	
Rockingham	40	Linda McGrath	Rep	Rockingham	40	Justin Packard	
Strafford	1	Susan DeLemus	Rep	Strafford	1	Packy Campbell	
Strafford	1	Robley Hall	Rep	Strafford	1	Andy Dow	
Strafford	2	Glenn Bailey	Rep	Strafford	2	Glenn Bailey	
Strafford	2	Michael Granger	Rep	Strafford	2	Michael Granger	
Strafford	2	Claudine Burnham	Rep	Strafford	2	Larry Brown	
Strafford	3	Susan DeRoy	Rep	Strafford	3	Susan DeRoy	
Strafford	4	Len Turcotte	Dem	Strafford	4	Kimberly McGlinchey	
Strafford	4	Cassandra Levesque	Dem	Strafford	4	Ginna Schonwald	
Strafford	4	Heath Howard †	Rep	Strafford	4	Scott Shepard	
Strafford	5	Thomas Kaczynski Jr.	Rep	Strafford	5	William Fessenden	
Strafford	6	Denise DeDe-Poulin	Rep	Strafford	6	Daniel Fitzpatrick	
Strafford	7	Aidan Ankarberg	Ind (Note: Ankarber switched parties in December 2024.)	Strafford	7	John Larochelle	
Strafford	8	Samuel Farrington	Dem	Strafford	8	Ty Wyman	
Strafford	9	Amy Malone	Rep	Strafford	9	Nevin Dexter	
Strafford	10	Marjorie Smith	Dem	Strafford	10	Siena Schaier	
Strafford	10	Loren Selig	Dem	Strafford	10	Loren Selig	
Strafford	10	Timothy Horrigan	Dem	Strafford	10	Timothy Horrigan	
Strafford	10	Wayne Burton	Dem	Strafford	10	Wayne Burton	
Strafford	11	Janet Wall	Dem	Strafford	11	Janet Wall	
Strafford	11	Erik Johnson	Dem	Strafford	11	Erik Johnson	
Strafford	11	Thomas Southworth	Dem	Strafford	11	Thomas Southworth	
Strafford	12	Billie Butler	Dem	Strafford	12	Billie Butler	
Strafford	12	Myles England	Dem	Strafford	12	Myles England	
Strafford	12	John Stone	Dem	Strafford	12	Will Hurley	
Strafford	12	Wayne Pearson	Dem	Strafford	12	Wayne Pearson	
Strafford	13	Peter Bixby	Dem	Strafford	13	Peter Bixby	
Strafford	14	Peter B. Schmidt	Dem	Strafford	14	Peter B. Schmidt	
Strafford	15	Alice Wade	Dem	Strafford	15	Samuel Chouinard	
Strafford	16	Gary Gilmore	Dem	Strafford	16	Gary Gilmore	
Strafford	17	Jessica LaMontagne	Dem	Strafford	17	Jessica LaMontagne	
Strafford	18	Michael Harrington	Rep	Strafford	18	Michael Harrington	
Strafford	19	David Walker	Rep	Strafford	19	Jonathan King	
Strafford	19	John Larochelle	Dem	Strafford	19	Justin McIsaac	
Strafford	19	Kelley Potenza	Rep	Strafford	19	Nick Paul	
Strafford	20	Allan Howland	Dem	Strafford	20	Allan Howland	
Strafford	21	Luz Bay	Dem	Strafford	21	Alice Wade	
Strafford	21	Seth Miller	Dem	Strafford	21	Seth Miller	
Strafford	21	Geoffrey Smith	Dem	Strafford	21	Geoffrey Smith	
Sullivan	1	Brian Sullivan	Dem	Sullivan	1	Brian Sullivan	
Sullivan	2	William Palmer	Dem	Sullivan	2	Jenny Ramsey	
Sullivan	3	Skip Rollins	Rep	Sullivan	3	Skip Rollins	
Sullivan	3	Steven D. Smith	Rep	Sullivan	3	Steven D. Smith	
Sullivan	3	Walter Spilsbury	Rep	Sullivan	3	Walter Spilsbury	
Sullivan	4	Judy Aron	Rep	Sullivan	4	Ron Rule	
Sullivan	5	George Grant	Rep	Sullivan	5	Judith Thackaberry	
Sullivan	6	Dale Girard	Rep (Note: Girard switched parties in April 2026)	Sullivan	6	Chris Cogswell	
Sullivan	6	John Cloutier	Dem	Sullivan	6	John Cloutier	
Sullivan	6	Wayne Hemingway	Rep	Sullivan	6	Lisa Gosselin	
Sullivan	7	Margaret Drye	Rep	Sullivan	7	Lawrence Schissel	
Sullivan	8	Hope Damon	Dem	Sullivan	8	Hope Damon	
Sullivan	8	Michael Aron	Rep	Sullivan	8	Samuel Deering	
