= Kevin Scully (New Hampshire politician) =

American politician

Member of the New Hampshire House of Representatives from the Hillsborough 8th district
- Incumbent
- Assumed office December 4, 2024 Serving with Christal Lloyd, Efstathia Booras
- Preceded by: Fran Nutter-Upham

Member of the New Hampshire House of Representatives from the Hillsborough 33rd district
- In office December 7, 2016 – December 5, 2018 Serving with Ken N. Gidge, Mark King
- Preceded by: Lee Guerrette; Efstathia Booras
- Succeeded by: Fran Nutter-Upham

Personal details
- Born: Everett, Massachusetts
- Party: Republican
- Education: Boston College

Kevin Scully is an American politician. He is a member of the New Hampshire House of Representatives. Scully attended Boston College.
