= Dossett =

Dossett is a surname. Notable people with the surname include:

- Chappell Dossett (1883–1961), British actor
- J.J. Dossett, American politician from Oklahoma
- Jo Anna Dossett, American politician from Oklahoma
- John Dossett (born c. 1958), American actor and singer
- Martin Dossett (born 1978), American college football player
- Myron Dossett (born 1961), American politician from Kentucky

== See also ==
- Dorsett
