= Michael Granger (disambiguation) =

Michael Granger (1923–1981) was an American actor.

Michael Granger may also refer to:

- Michael Granger (politician), American politician
- Mick Granger (1931–2016), English footballer
- Mike Granger (born 1991), American sprinter
