= Charles Foote =

Charles Foote may refer to:

- Charles A. Foote (1785–1828), United States Representative from New York
- Charles C. Foote (1811–1891), American Presbyterian minister, abolitionist and temperance activist
- Charles L. Foote, American ice hockey player and coach
- Charles Foote (New Hampshire politician), member of the New Hampshire House of Representatives
