= Kevin Nugent Jr. =

American politician

Member-elect of the New Hampshire House of Representatives from the Belknap 4th District
- Assuming office December 2, 2026
- Succeeding: Travis Toner

Personal details
- Party: Republican

Kevin Nugent Jr. is an American politician. A member of the Republican Party, he is the member-elect for the Belknap 4th District in the New Hampshire House of Representatives. Nugent is a dispatcher.

== See also ==
- 2026 New Hampshire House of Representatives election
