= Kassas =

Kassas is a surname. Notable people with the surname include:

- George Kassas, American politician
- Ibrahim Kassas, Tunisian politician
- Mohamed Kassas (1921–2012), Egyptian botanist and conservationist
- Mohammad Kassas (born 1976), Lebanese footballer

== See also ==
- Kassa (name)
