= Lee Nyquist =

American politician

Member of the New Hampshire House of Representatives from the Hillsborough 42nd district
- Incumbent
- Assumed office December 2, 2026

Personal details
- Party: Democratic

Lee Nyquist is an American politician. A member of the Democratic Party, he is the member-elect for the Hillsborough 42nd district of the New Hampshire House of Representatives. He was elected in the general election on November 3, 2026, and is due to take office on December 2, 2026.

== Early life and career ==
Nyquist earned a bachelor's degree from Harvard College and a J.D. from the Washington College of Law at American University. He worked as an attorney for 40 years before retiring. He has served as town moderator of New Boston for 34 years, since 1992, and has chaired the New Hampshire Unemployment Compensation Advisory Council since 2005. He served as president of the New Hampshire Trial Lawyers Association in 1988–1989 and of the Manchester Bar Association in 1992–1993.

== Elections ==
Nyquist was elected to the New Hampshire House of Representatives in the general election on November 3, 2026, winning one of the three seats in the Hillsborough 42nd district, which covers Lyndeborough, Mont Vernon and New Boston. He finished first with 2,985 votes (18.6%), ahead of fellow Democrats Teri Harkins (2,928 votes) and Peter Ryder (2,927 votes), who also won seats. In the Democratic primary on September 8, 2026, Nyquist won 1,050 votes (34.0%), ahead of Harkins (1,035) and Ryder (1,000). Nyquist previously ran for the New Hampshire Senate in District 9 in 2012, 2014 and 2016, losing all three times to Republican Andy Sanborn. In 2012, he lost by 213 votes after a recount, the closest race of that election.

== Personal life ==
Nyquist is a long-time resident of New Boston. He is married to Leslie Nixon, and they have five children. As of September 2026, he was 74 years old.
