= Eric Hoffman =

Eric Hoffman may refer to:

- Eric Hoffman (politician), American politician
- Eric Hoffman (fl. 1980s–2000s), founding member of American death metal band Deicide (band)
- Eric Von Hoffman (fl. 2010s), also credited as Eric Hoffman, comedy writer with Upright Citizens Brigade and Mr. Show with Bob and David, screenwriter of Girlfriend's Day

== See also ==
- Eric Hoffmann (born 1984), Luxembourgish football player
- Erik Hoffmann (born 1981), Namibian bicycle racer
- Erika Hoffman (fl. 1980s–1990s), British actress
- Erik Huffman (fl. 2000s), contestant on the television show Survivor (see List of Survivor (American TV series) contestants)
