= Rockmore =

Rockmore is a surname. Notable people with the surname include:

- Clara Rockmore (1911–1998), Lithuanian electronic musician
- Ellen Rockmore, American politician
- Noel Rockmore (1928–1995), American painter, draughtsman, and sculptor
- Tom Rockmore (born 1942), American philosopher

== See also ==
- Mount Rockmore, music album
