= Rivard =

Rivard is a surname of French origin meaning "of the river". Notable people with the surname include:

- Antoine Rivard (1898–1985), French Canadian politician from Quebec
- Augustin Rivard (1743–1798), Canadian farmer and political figure
- Aurélie Rivard (born 1996), Canadian Paralympic swimmer
- Bobby Rivard (1939–2023), Canadian ice hockey player
- David Rivard (born 1953), American poet
- Denise Poirier-Rivard (born 1941), Canadian politician from Quebec
- Fern Rivard (1946–1993), Canadian ice hockey player
- Guy Rivard (born 1936), Canadian politician
- Lisa Rivard, American politician
- Lucien Rivard (1914–2002), French criminal known for a sensational prison escape
- Michel Rivard (musician) (born 1951), Québécois singer and songwriter
- Rémy Girard (born 1950), Québécois actor and television host
