= Seth Miller =

Seth Miller may refer to:

- Seth Miller (American football)
- Seth Miller (politician)
- Seth Miller (House)
