= Boutin =

Boutin is a surname, and may refer to:

- Anne Boutin (born 1968), French physical chemist and theoretical chemist
- Charles R. Boutin (1942–2021), American politician
- Christine Boutin (born 1944), French politician
- Debra Boutin, American mathematician
- François Boutin (1937–1995), French horse trainer
- Joëlle Boutin (born 1979), Canadian politician
- Kim Boutin (born 1994), Canadian short track ice skater
- Michael Boutin (born 1981), American politician
- Paul Boutin (born 1961), American journalist
- Paul Boutin (born 1970), French-born American sound engineer
- Rebecca Boutin, American politician
- Rollie Boutin (born 1957), Canadian ice hockey goaltender
