= Ginna =

Ginna may refer to:

- Ginna Nuclear Generating Station, Ontario, New York, United States
- Arnaldo Ginna (1890-1982), Italian painter, sculptor and filmmaker
- Ginna Lopez (born 1994), member of the Peru women's national volleyball team
- Ginna Marston (born 1958), American advertising executive
- Ginna Schonwald, American politician
- Ginna, competitor in the Danish reality television series Big Brother 6
- Ginna (film), a 2022 Indian romantic action comedy
