= Frank Anthony (disambiguation) =

Frank Anthony (1908–1993) was an Indian politician

Frank Anthony may also be:

- Frank Anthony (American politician), American politician
- Frank Anthony (writer) (1891–1927), New Zealand seaman and writer
- Frank C.S. Anthony, Guyanese politician
