= Linda Ryan =

Linda Ryan may refer to:

- Linda Ryan (sport shooter)
- Linda Ryan (bowls)
- Linda Ryan (politician)
