= Brian Cole (politician) =

American politician

Member of the New Hampshire House of Representatives from the Hillsborough 26th district
- Incumbent
- Assumed office December 7, 2022
- Preceded by: John Lewicke; Diane Pauer

Personal details
- Born: Brian Douglas Cole; December 18, 1971 (age 54) Concord, New Hampshire, U.S.
- Party: Republican
- Education: Southern New Hampshire University (BS)

Brian Douglas Cole (born December 18, 1971) is an American politician. He is a Republican member for the Hillsborough 26th district of the New Hampshire House of Representatives. He is not seeking re-election in the 2026 State House election.

On August 4, 2025, Cole announced that he would be a candidate for the United States House of Representatives in District 1. Cole was defeated in that race by Anthony DiLorenzo.
