= Dorsett =

Dorsett is a surname. Notable people with the surname Dorsett include:

- Andrew Dorsett, American politician
- Anthony Dorsett (born 1973), American and Canadian football player, son of Tony Dorsett
- David J. Dorsett (born 1956), United States Navy vice admiral
- Derek Dorsett (born 1986), Canadian ice hockey player
- Dicky Dorsett (1919–1999), English footballer
- Georgina Dorsett, British actress
- Juanianne Dorsett, Bahamian politician
- Katie G. Dorsett (1932–2020), American politician
- Martha Angle Dorsett (1851–1918), American lawyer
- Phillip Dorsett, (born 1993), American football player
- Tony Dorsett (born 1954), American football player
