= Hal Rafter =

American politician

Member of the New Hampshire House of Representatives from the Rockingham 1st district
- Incumbent
- Assumed office October 4, 2023

Personal details
- Party: Democratic

Hal Rafter is an American politician. He serves as a Democratic member for the Rockingham 1st district of the New Hampshire House of Representatives.

== Life and career ==
Rafter is a former Nottingham town and school board member.

In 2023, Rafter defeated James Guzofski in the special general election for the Rockingham 1st district of the New Hampshire House of Representatives, winning 55 percent of the vote.
