= Latha Mangipudi =

American politician

Member of the New Hampshire House of Representatives from the Hillsborough 35th district
- In office November 13, 2013 – December 4, 2024
- Preceded by: Roland LaPlante
- Succeeded by: Manoj Chourasia

Personal details
- Party: Democratic
- Education: All India Institute of Speech and Hearing

Latha Mangipudi is a New Hampshire politician.

== Education ==
Mangipudi graduated from the All India Institute of Speech and Hearing.

== Career ==
On November 5, 2013, Mangipudi was elected to the New Hampshire House of Representatives where she represents the Hillsborough 35 district. Mangipudi assumed office on November 13, 2013. Mangipudi is a Democrat.

== Personal life ==
Mangipudi resides in Nashua, New Hampshire. Mangipudi is married and has two children. She is of Telugu descent.
