= Matthew Brown (New Hampshire politician) =

American state representative

Member-Elect of the New Hampshire House of Representatives from the Hillsborough 12th district
- Incumbent
- Assumed office December 2026

Personal details
- Party: Democratic

Matthew Brown is a New Hampshire politician.

== Career ==
Brown served as the student representative on the Merrimack, New Hampshire school board. In 2022, Brown partnered with State Representative Rosemarie Rung to pass legislation to add an eating disorder helpline to student ID cards. Brown was elected to the New Hampshire House of Representatives in 2026, he received 6,543 votes, coming in fifth place. Brown is also a member of the Merrimack Heritage Commission.
