= Susan Vandecasteele =

American politician

Member of the New Hampshire House of Representatives from the Rockingham 8th district
- In office 2020 – December 7, 2022

Member of the New Hampshire House of Representatives from the Rockingham 25th district
- Incumbent
- Assumed office December 7, 2022

Personal details
- Party: Republican

Susan Vandecasteele is an American politician. Since 2022, she serves as a Republican member for the Rockingham 25th district of the New Hampshire House of Representatives. She was originally elected in 2020 to represent the Rockingham 8th district. She was reelected for the Rockingham 25th district in 2026.

Vandecasteele has worked in the automotive industry, including as a service manager for Key Hyundai of Salem, and as customer service at Salem Ford.

== Early life and education ==
Vandecasteele was born and raised in Salem, New Hampshire. In 1986, she graduated from Salem High School.
