= Dylan Germana =

American politician

Member of the New Hampshire House of Representatives from the Cheshire 1st district
- In office December 4, 2024 – January 30, 2026
- Preceded by: Nicholas Germana
- Incumbent
- Assumed office December 2026

Personal details
- Party: Democratic

Dylan Germana is an American politician. He served as a Democratic member of the New Hampshire House of Representatives, elected in 2024 from the Cheshire 1st district. On January 30, 2026, Representative Germana resigned from the state house following an investigation involving residency status.
