= Scott Bryer =

American politician

Member of New Hampshire House of Representatives for Rockingham County's 1st district
- In office December 4, 2024 – December 2, 2026

Personal details
- Party: Republican
- Education: University of Massachusetts Boston; Southern New Hampshire University

Scott R. Bryer is an American politician. He is a member of the New Hampshire House of Representatives. He was elected in 2024. He was defeated in 2026.
