= Joe Schapiro =

American politician

Member of the New Hampshire House of Representatives from the Cheshire 16th district
- Incumbent
- Assumed office December 5, 2018
- Succeeded by: James Gruber (elect)

Personal details
- Party: Democratic

Joe Schapiro is an American politician who served as a Democratic member for the Cheshire 16th district of the New Hampshire House of Representatives.
