= Shaun Filiault =

New Hampshire politician

Member of New Hampshire House of Representatives for Cheshire 7
- In office December 7, 2022 – July 31, 2024
- Preceded by: Sparky Von Plinsky
- Succeeded by: Terri O'Rorke

Personal details
- Born: 1981 (age 44–45)
- Party: Independent (since 2023)
- Other political affiliations: Democratic (until 2023)
- Education: Boston University; University of South Australia; University of New Hampshire School of Law

Shaun Filiault is an American politician who served as a member of the New Hampshire House of Representatives from the Cheshire 7 District. He assumed office on December 7, 2022. He was also chairman of the Keene, New Hampshire, Democratic Committee prior to changing his party affiliation to Independent in June 2023.

On June 6, 2024, Filiault announced he would not seek re-election as he and his fiance planned to move out-of-state after Filiault’s term. He resigned from the House on July 31, 2024, as that anticipated out-of-state move ultimately occurred prior to the end of the term.

== Early life and education ==
Filiault was born in 1981 and raised in New Hampshire and educated in the Keene public school system. He earned a Bachelor of Arts degree from Boston University before earning his PhD at the University of South Australia. He later earned a Juris Doctor degree from the University of New Hampshire School of Law.

== Career ==
After earning his PhD, Filiault was a lecturer in health promotion at Flinders University in Adelaide, Australia. He specialized in men's health issues and published numerous articles in men's health promotion and men's body image. He subsequently changed careers and graduated from law school, passing the New York and New Hampshire bar exams. He clerked for Judge William G. Young in the U.S. District Court for the District of Massachusetts.

== Electoral History and Legislative Career ==
In 2020, Filiault won a seat on the Keene School Board. He later resigned that seat because an attorney at the law firm for which he worked was appointed the school district’s counsel and Filiault wished to avoid the possibility of a conflict of interests.

In 2022, Filiault defeated incumbent Rep. John Bordenet in the Democratic primary to represent the newly redistricted Cheshire 7 District, which covers Ward 2 in Keene. Filiault won that race with 74.9% of the vote to Bordenet’s 25.1% of the vote. Filiault cited Bordenet’s positions on the “gay panic defense,” gun violence prevention, and marijuana legalization as major reasons for challenging the incumbent Bordenet. Filiault then defeated Republican nominee David Kamm in the general election, with 73.9% of the vote to Kamm's 26.1%.

Filiault was a member of House Commerce and Consumer Affairs Committee.

In June 2023 Filiault left the House Democratic caucus and registered as an independent over disagreements about his legislative deal-making with Republicans.

In 2023, Filiault was the prime sponsor of HB 315, which sought to abolish the "gay panic defense" in New Hampshire. The bill passed both the House and Senate in June 2023 after first going to a "committee of conference" between the two chambers. The bill was signed by Governor Chris Sununu in August 2023, and went into effect on midnight January 1, 2024. The bill marks the first time a state with a Republican-controlled legislature and executive abolished the gay panic defense.

== Post-Electoral Career ==
After resigning from the legislature, Filiault ultimately returned to New Hampshire and continued serving the State. He was the Administrative Rules Coordinator for the New Hampshire Department of Safety. He is now an attorney for New Hampshire's Office of the Consumer Advocate.
