= Dennis Mannion (politician) =

American politician

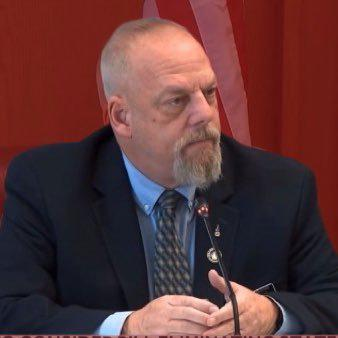
- Mannion in 2023

Member of the New Hampshire House of Representatives from the Rockingham 25 district
- Incumbent
- Assumed office December 7, 2022

Personal details
- Party: Republican
- Website: www.gencourt.state.nh.us/house/members/member.aspx?member=409127

Dennis Mannion is an American politician serving as a Republican member of the New Hampshire House of Representatives from Rockingham District 25, representing Salem, New Hampshire. First elected in 2022, he currently serves as vice chair of the House Judiciary Committee.

== Early life and career ==
Mannion is a resident of Salem, New Hampshire, where he has lived for over 20 years.

He graduated from Greater Lawrence Regional Vocational Technical High School.

Mannion has over 30 years of experience in law enforcement, including eight years as a police prosecutor.

== Political career ==
Mannion was elected to the New Hampshire House of Representatives in the 2022 election, representing Rockingham District 25 (Salem). He was assigned to the Criminal Justice and Public Safety Committee for the 2023–2024 legislative term.In the 2024 election, Mannion successfully ran for re-election, winning the general election held on November 5, 2024. For the 2025–2026 term, he was appointed vice chair of the Judiciary Committee. Mannion has been involved in legislation related to criminal justice reforms. In March 2024, he supported a bill to legalize brass knuckles, blackjacks, and slingshots, which passed the House.
