= James Gruber (politician) =

American politician

Member of the New Hampshire House of Representatives from the Cheshire 16th district
- Incumbent
- Assumed office December 4, 2024
- Preceded by: Joe Schapiro

Personal details
- Party: Democratic
- Education: San Diego State University (BA); Massachusetts Institute of Technology (MS); Harvard Kennedy School (MPA); University of Zagreb (PhD)

James Gruber is an American politician. He serves as a Democratic member for the Cheshire 16th district of the New Hampshire House of Representatives.

Gruber was a professor at Antioch University New England. He moved to Alstead, New Hampshire in 1978.
