= Eric Turer =

American politician

Member of the New Hampshire House of Representatives from the Rockingham 6th district
- Incumbent
- Assumed office December 7, 2022

Personal details
- Party: Democratic

Eric Turer is an American politician. He serves as a Democratic member for the Rockingham 6th district of the New Hampshire House of Representatives.

== Life and career ==
Turer is a former board member of the New England Rural Health Association.

In November 2022, Turer defeated Melissa Litchfield in the general election for the Rockingham 6th district of the New Hampshire House of Representatives, winning 50 percent of the votes. He assumed office in December 2022.
