= Liz Barbour =

American politician

Member of New Hampshire House of Representatives for Rockingham 35
- Incumbent
- Assumed office December 4, 2024

Personal details
- Party: Republican
- Education: Syracuse University
- Website: lizforhollis.com

Liz Barbour is an American politician. She is a member of the New Hampshire House of Representatives.

Barbour has lived in Hollis, New Hampshire for 25 years. She holds a Bachelor of Arts in Speech Communication from Syracuse University.
