= Marie Morgan =

Marie B. Morgan is an American politician. She was elected to the New Hampshire House of Representatives in 2026.
