= Denise DeDe-Poulin =

American politician

Member of New Hampshire House of Representatives for Strafford 6
- Incumbent
- Assumed office December 4, 2024
- Preceded by: Clifford Newton

Personal details
- Party: Republican
- Website: dedepoulin.com

Denise DeDe-Poulin is an American politician. She is a member of the New Hampshire House of Representatives.
