= Mike Drago =

American politician

Member of the New Hampshire House of Representatives from the Rockingham 4th district
- Incumbent
- Assumed office December 7, 2022

Personal details
- Party: Republican

Mike Drago is an American politician. He serves as a Republican member for the Rockingham 4th district of the New Hampshire House of Representatives.
