= Jim Marshall (New Hampshire politician) =

American politician

Member of the New Hampshire House of Representatives from the Rockingham 13th district
- Incumbent
- Assumed office December 2026

Personal details
- Party: Democratic

Jim Marshall is an American politician. A member of the Democratic Party, he is the member-elect for the Rockingham 13th district of the New Hampshire House of Representatives.
