= Sayra DeVito =

American politician

Member of New Hampshire House of Representatives for Rockingham 8
- Incumbent
- Assumed office December 4, 2024
- Preceded by: Scott Wallace

Personal details
- Party: Republican

Sayra DeVito is an American politician. She is a member of the New Hampshire House of Representatives.
