= Daniel LeClerc =

American politician

Member of the New Hampshire House of Representatives from the Hillsborough 34th district
- In office December 2022 – Present

Personal details
- Party: Democratic

Daniel LeClerc is an American politician. He serves as a Democratic member for the Hillsborough 34th district of the New Hampshire House of Representatives.

== Political career ==
LeClerc was first elected to the New Hampshire House of Representatives in 2022. LeClerc serves on the Labor, Industrial and Rehabilitative Services Committee.

On February 22, 2024, LeClerc gave a speech opposing Right-to-Work.

== Personal life ==
LeClerc resides in Amherst, New Hampshire. LeClerc is married and has two children.
