= Donald Selby =

American politician

Member of New Hampshire House of Representatives for Rockingham County's 9th district
- Incumbent
- Assumed office December 4, 2024

Personal details
- Party: Republican

Donald Evan Selby is an American politician. He is a member of the New Hampshire House of Representatives.
