= Dan Bergeron =

American politician

Member of New Hampshire House of Representatives for Hillsborough County's 16th district
- Incumbent
- Assumed office December 4, 2024

Personal details
- Party: Democratic

Dan Bergeron is an American politician. He is a member of the New Hampshire House of Representatives.
