= Gary Gilmore (politician) =

American politician

Member of New Hampshire House of Representatives for Strafford County's 16th district
- Incumbent
- Assumed office December 4, 2024

Personal details
- Party: Democratic
- Education: University of New Hampshire

Gary R. Gilmore is an American politician. He is a member of the New Hampshire House of Representatives. His district contains parts of Dover.

Gilmore moved to Dover, New Hampshire in 1978 after graduating from the University of New Hampshire with a degree in psychology.
