= Stephanie Grund =

American politician

Member of the New Hampshire House of Representatives from the Hillsborough 34th district
- Incumbent
- Assumed office December 4, 2024

Personal details
- Party: Democratic

Stephanie Grund is an American politician. She serves as a Democratic member for the Hillsborough 34th district of the New Hampshire House of Representatives.

== Personal life ==
Grund graduated from Solon High School in Ohio. She attended Ohio Northern University and earned a bachelor's degree from Case Western Reserve University in 1992. Grund now resides in Amherst, New Hampshire.

== Political career ==
Grund was elected to the New Hampshire House of Representatives in 2024. She has served on the Souhegan Cooperative School Board since 2020 and became its chair in 2021.
