= Laurence Miner =

American politicia from New Hampshire

Member of New Hampshire House of Representatives for Rockingham County's 7th district
- Incumbent
- Assumed office December 4, 2024
- Preceded by: Emily Phillips

Personal details
- Party: Republican

Laurence A. Miner is an American politician. He is a member of the New Hampshire House of Representatives.
