= Ned Raynolds =

American politician

Member of the New Hampshire House of Representatives from the Rockingham 39th district
- Incumbent
- Assumed office December 7, 2022

Personal details
- Party: Democratic
- Children: 3
- Education: Harvard Kennedy School of Government

Ned Raynolds is an American politician. He serves as a Democratic member for the Rockingham 39th district of the New Hampshire House of Representatives.

== Education and career ==
Raynolds attended United States Coast Guard Academy and Harvard Kennedy School of Government.

In November 2022, Raynolds defeated Sue Polidura in the general election for the Rockingham 39th district of the New Hampshire House of Representatives, winning 69 percent of the votes. He assumed office in December 2022.
