= Robley Hall =

American politician

Member of New Hampshire House of Representatives for Strafford County's 1st district
- Incumbent
- Assumed office December 4, 2024

Personal details
- Party: Republican

Robley Hall is an American politician. He is a member of the New Hampshire House of Representatives.

Hall is an activist with the libertarian Free State Project.
