= Jeffrey Tenczar =

American politician

The Honorable Jeffrey Tenczar

Member of the New Hampshire House of Representatives from the Hillsborough 1st district
- Incumbent
- Assumed office December 7, 2022

Personal details
- Party: Republican
- Education: Suffolk University, Northeastern University
- Website: LinkedIn

Jeffrey Tenczar is an American politician. He serves as a Republican member for the Hillsborough 1st district of the New Hampshire House of Representatives.
