= John Larochelle =

American politician

Member of New Hampshire House of Representatives for Strafford County's 19th district
- Incumbent
- Assumed office December 4, 2024

Personal details
- Born: Rochester, New Hampshire
- Party: Democratic
- Education: University of New Hampshire; Iowa State University
- Website: www.rochesternh.gov/people/john-larochelle

John Larochelle is an American politician. He is a member of the New Hampshire House of Representatives.

Larochelle has served on Rochester City Council, as Mayor and on the Police Commission and Economic Development Commission. He is a United States Army veteran.
