= David Nagel (politician) =

American politician

Member of the New Hampshire House of Representatives from the Belknap 6th district
- Incumbent
- Assumed office December 7, 2022

Personal details
- Party: Republican (before 2026); Democratic (2026–present)

David Nagel is an American politician from New Hampshire. Elected as a Republican for the Belknap 6th district of the New Hampshire House of Representatives in 2022 and re-elected in 2024, he became a Democrat on February 4, 2026.
