= Terry Spahr =

American politician

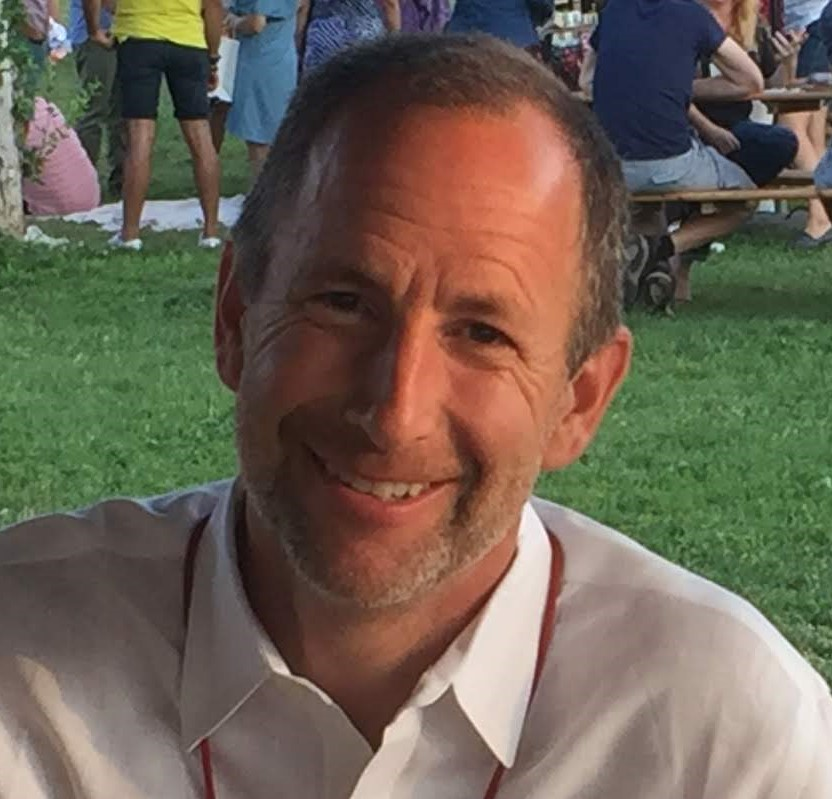

Member of the New Hampshire House of Representatives from the Grafton 12th district
- Incumbent
- Assumed office December 4, 2024

Personal details
- Born: February 17, 1966 (age 60)
- Party: Democratic

Terry Spahr (born February 17, 1966) is an American businessman, filmmaker, environmental activist and politician. He is the executive director of Earth Overshoot, a non-profit dedicated to sustainability is an American politician. He serves as a Democratic member for the Grafton 12th district of the New Hampshire House of Representatives.

== Early life and education ==
Spahr was born in Philadelphia, Pennsylvania on February 17, 1966. He graduated from The Haverford School and attended the University of Pennsylvania, where he earned a bachelor's degree in American History in 1988. At Penn he played squash in and achieved All American recognition in the sport. He returned to Penn and earned a master's degree in Public Administration from the Fels Institute of Government in 1996.

== Career ==
In 1988 Spahr started in the financial services field selling insurance and investment products through Northwestern Mutual Life and Baird Securities earning his series 6 and 63 securities licenses and achieving CLU and CHFC designations.

Subsequently, Spahr acquired his Virginia Real Estate sales license in 1996 and joined Long & Foster Real Estate as a salesperson. In 2001 he was appointed to open and managed the company's first real estate office in Pennsylvania, and in 2011 he was promoted to regional vice president. Spahr was responsible for the growth and success of over twenty Long and Foster offices and 1000 agents throughout New Jersey, Delaware and the Eastern Shore of Maryland. He was a member of the board of directors of Long and Foster Companies.

In 2016 he left the real estate industry to write and produce 8 Billion Angels, an award-winning environmental and human health documentary, that premiered globally April 2021. In 2018 Spahr established Earth Overshoot, a 501c3 non profit focused on education and advocacy for a sustainable world, and acts as the organization's Executive Director. An expert in sustainability, he lectures, does media interviews^{,} and appearances, writes blogs, articles and op-eds in addition to numerous activist campaigns surrounding humanity's impact on the planet and people.

In 2024 Spahr ran for the New Hampshire State Legislature in the Grafton County 12th district as a Democrat. He was successfully elected and is serving in the 2025 New Hampshire legislative bienniel session on the Ways and Means Committee. In 2025 Spahr was appointed by the Governor to the Charitable Gaming Study Commission. He also serves on the Executive Committee for Grafton County.

Additionally he is a member of the Emerging Technology Caucus of the New Hampshire Legislature.

== Personal life ==
Spahr is divorced and has three adult sons, Callaway, Jackson and Griffin. He lives with his partner Sara Perine in Hanover, New Hampshire.
