= Chris Muns =

American politician

Member of the New Hampshire House of Representatives from the Rockingham 29th district
- Incumbent
- Assumed office December 7, 2022

Member of the New Hampshire House of Representatives from the Rockingham 21st district
- In office December 5, 2012 – December 3, 2014

Personal details
- Party: Democratic

Chris Muns is an American politician. He serves as a Democratic member for the Rockingham 29th district of the New Hampshire House of Representatives.
