= Tom Mannion (politician) =

American politician

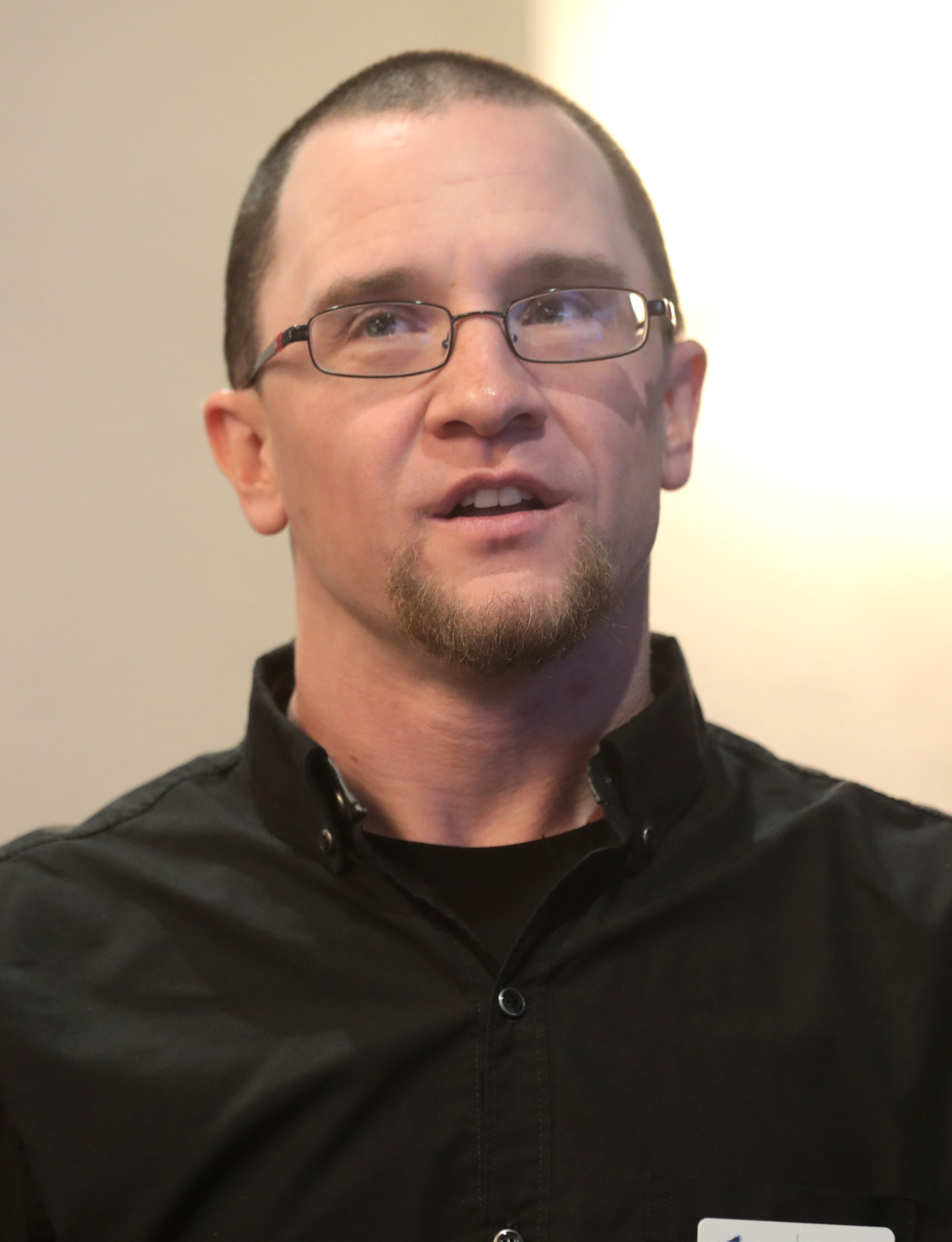
- Mannion in 2022

Member of the New Hampshire House of Representatives from the Hillsborough 1st district
- Incumbent
- Assumed office December 7, 2022

Personal details
- Party: Republican

Tom Mannion is an American politician. He serves as a Republican member for the Hillsborough 1st district of the New Hampshire House of Representatives.
