= Erin Kerwin =

American politician

Member of New Hampshire House of Representatives for Hillsborough 40
- Incumbent
- Assumed office December 4, 2024

Personal details
- Born: Cleveland, Ohio
- Party: Democratic
- Education: New York University

Erin Kerwin is an American politician. She is a member of the New Hampshire House of Representatives.

Kerwin is a former social worker and schoolteacher.
