= Andy Dow (politician) =

American politician

Member of the New Hampshire House of Representatives from the Strafford 1st district
- Incumbent
- Assumed office December 2026

Personal details
- Party: Republican

Andy Dow is an American politician. A member of the Republican Party, he is the member-elect for the Strafford 1st district of the New Hampshire House of Representatives.
