= Allan Howland =

American politician

Member of the New Hampshire House of Representatives from the Strafford 20th district
- Incumbent
- Assumed office December 7, 2022

Personal details
- Party: Democratic

Allan Howland is an American politician. He serves as a Democratic member for the Strafford 20th district of the New Hampshire House of Representatives.

== Life and career ==
Howland is a former high school science teacher.

In November 2022, Howland defeated Mark Racic in the general election for the Strafford 20th district of the New Hampshire House of Representatives, winning 71 percent of the votes. He assumed office in December 2022.
