= Matt Drew =

American politician

Member of New Hampshire House of Representatives for Hillsborough County's 19th district
- Incumbent
- Assumed office December 4, 2024

Personal details
- Party: Republican
- Website: mdrew4nh.org

Matt Drew is an American politician. A member of the Republican Party, he is a member of the New Hampshire House of Representatives.

In the state House, Drew sought to eliminate all state vaccine requirements. In 2026, Drew sponsored an anti-vaccine bill (HB 1811) that was defeated on a 192–155 vote, with 35 Republicans joining all Democrats in voting no. However, a narrower bill co-sponsored by Drew, to remove the hepatitis B vaccine from the list of required vaccinations, passed along party lines, 186–168.
