= Vanessa Poulin =

American politician

Member of the New Hampshire House of Representatives from the Merrimack 27th district
- Incumbent
- Assumed office December 2026

Personal details
- Party: Republican

Vanessa Poulin is an American politician. A member of the Republican Party, she is the member-elect for the Merrimack 27th district of the New Hampshire House of Representatives.
