= David Walker (New Hampshire politician) =

American politician

Member of New Hampshire House of Representatives for Strafford County's 19th district
- Incumbent
- Assumed office December 4, 2024

Personal details
- Party: Republican

David Walker is an American politician. He is a member of the New Hampshire House of Representatives.

Walker was an unsuccessful candidate in a special election in Rochester Ward 4 in 2023.
