= Myles England =

American politician

Member of New Hampshire House of Representatives for Strafford County's 12th district
- Incumbent
- Assumed office December 4, 2024

Personal details
- Party: Democratic
- Education: University of New Hampshire

Myles England is an American politician. He is a member of the New Hampshire House of Representatives.

England grew up in Rollinsford, New Hampshire.
