= Suzanne Chretien =

American politician

Member of New Hampshire House of Representatives for Hillsborough 19
- Incumbent
- Assumed office December 4, 2024

Personal details
- Party: Democratic

Suzanne L. Chretien is an American politician. She is a member of the New Hampshire House of Representatives.

Chretien taught in Manchester Public Schools for 31 years. She has lived in Manchester most of her life and has two sons and four grandchildren.
