= James Newsom =

American politician

Member of New Hampshire House of Representatives for Merrimack County's 9th district
- Incumbent
- Assumed office December 4, 2024

Personal details
- Party: Democratic
- Education: University of Pennsylvania; Wharton School; Antioch University; Washington University in St. Louis

James Newsom is an American politician. He is a member of the New Hampshire House of Representatives.

Newsom was a school moderator for 10 years and was chair of the Hopkinton Library Foundation.
