= Louis Juris =

American politician

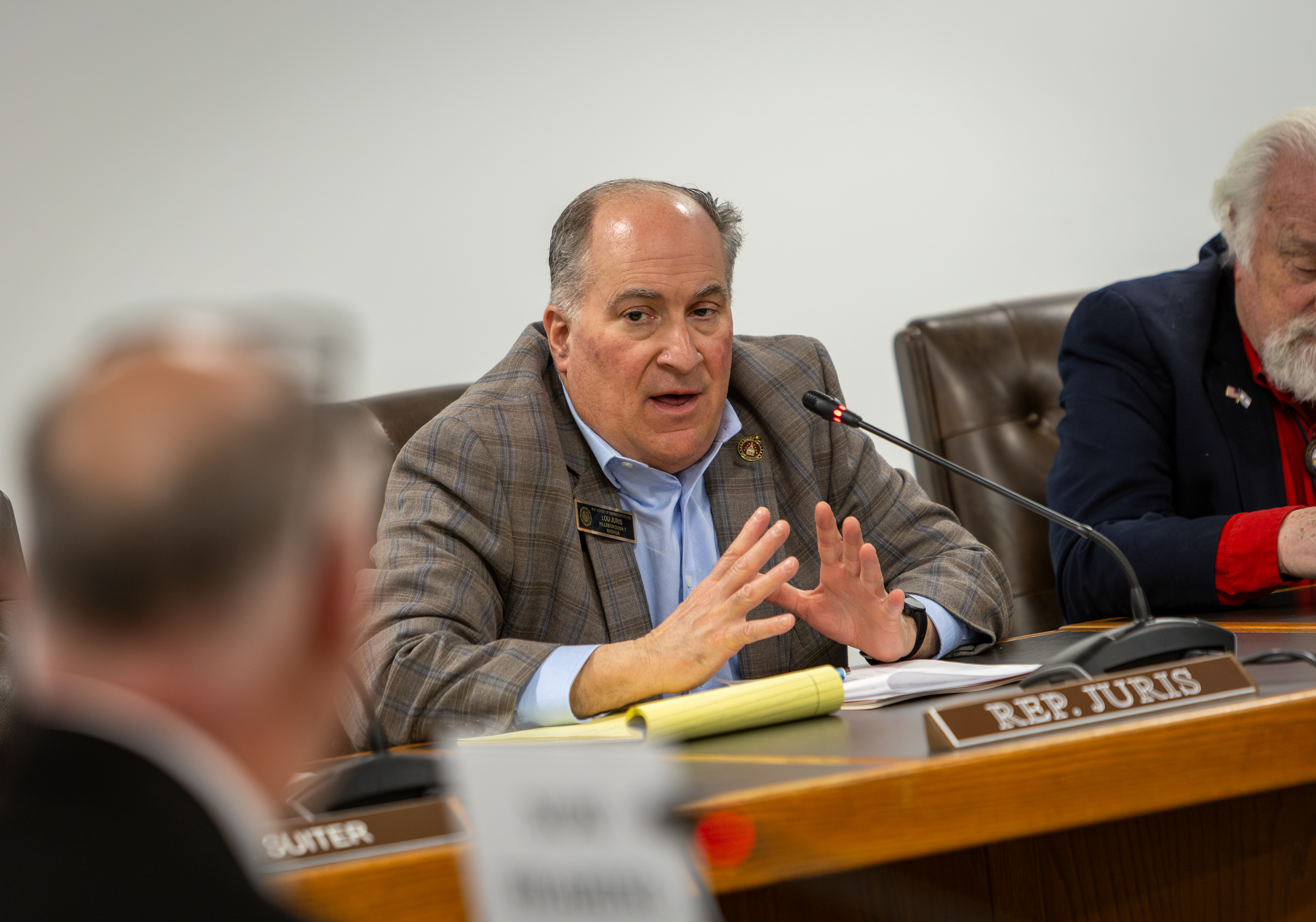
- Juris in 2026

Member of the New Hampshire House of Representatives from the Hillsborough 7th district
- Incumbent
- Assumed office December 7, 2022

Personal details
- Party: Democratic

Louis Juris is an American politician. He serves as a Democratic member for the Hillsborough 7th district of the New Hampshire House of Representatives.
