= Zoe Manos =

American politician

Member of the New Hampshire House of Representatives from the Rockingham 12th district
- Incumbent
- Assumed office December 7, 2022

Personal details
- Party: Democratic

Zoe Manos is an American politician. She serves as a Democratic member for the Rockingham 12th district of the New Hampshire House of Representatives.
