= Clayton Wood =

American politician

Member of the New Hampshire House of Representatives from the Merrimack 13th district
- Incumbent
- Assumed office December 7, 2022

Personal details
- Party: Republican

Clayton Wood is an American politician. He serves as a Republican member for the Merrimack 13th district of the New Hampshire House of Representatives.

== Controversies ==
In January 2026, Wood and fellow Republican state representative Cyril Aures walked out of a public forum on education policy in Pembroke after audience members pressed lawmakers about Republican positions on public education funding. The forum, organized by the Pembroke School Board to encourage dialogue between residents and legislators, became contentious as Wood and Aures disputed criticism from attendees and ultimately left before the event concluded. The incident was reported as highlighting tensions between some lawmakers and constituents over education policy debates in New Hampshire.
