= Philip Jones (American politician) =

American politician

Member of the New Hampshire House of Representatives from the Cheshire 3rd district
- Incumbent
- Assumed office December 7, 2022

Personal details
- Party: Democratic

Philip Jones is an American politician. He serves as a Democratic member for the Cheshire 3rd district of the New Hampshire House of Representatives. Jones is a member of the State-Federal Relations and Veterans Affairs committee.

Philip Jones is a fiscal conservative who claims to stand against all forms of extremism, he spent many years working as an independent Manufacturers Sales and Marketing Representative.

== Personal life ==
Jones has a BA in marketing from William Paterson University.

Jones is married to his wife, June, and has 3 daughters. In 2024 he mentioned having moved to Keene "30 years ago."
