= Carrie Sorensen =

American politician

Member of New Hampshire House of Representatives for Rockingham 28
- Incumbent
- Assumed office December 4, 2024
- Preceded by: Rebecca McBeath

Personal details
- Born: Nashua, New Hampshire
- Party: Democratic

Carrie Sorensen is an American politician. She is a member of the New Hampshire House of Representatives. Her district contains parts of Portsmouth.
