= Greg Sargent =

American politician

Member of New Hampshire House of Representatives for Merrimack County's 7th district
- Incumbent
- Assumed office December 4, 2024

Personal details
- Party: Democratic
- Education: University of New Hampshire; Boston Law School

Gregory M. Sargent is an American politician. He is a member of the New Hampshire House of Representatives. His district contains the towns of New London and Newbury.

Sargent graduated from the University of New Hampshire and Boston University School of Law.
