= Sheila Seidel =

American politician

Member of the New Hampshire House of Representatives from the Hillsborough 29th district
- In office December 7, 2022 – October 31, 2025

Personal details
- Born: New Hampshire, U.S.
- Party: Republican

Sheila Seidel is an American politician. She served as a Republican member for the Hillsborough 29th district of the New Hampshire House of Representatives. She resigned in October 2025.
