= Henry Giasson =

American politician

Member of New Hampshire House of Representatives for Hillsborough 29
- Incumbent
- Assumed office December 4, 2024

Personal details
- Born: Minot, North Dakota
- Party: Republican

Henry R. Giasson is an American politician. He is a member of the New Hampshire House of Representatives.

Giasson served in the United States Army for 24 years and is honorably retired and rated disabled by the United States Department of Veterans Affairs.
