= Kelley Potenza =

American politician

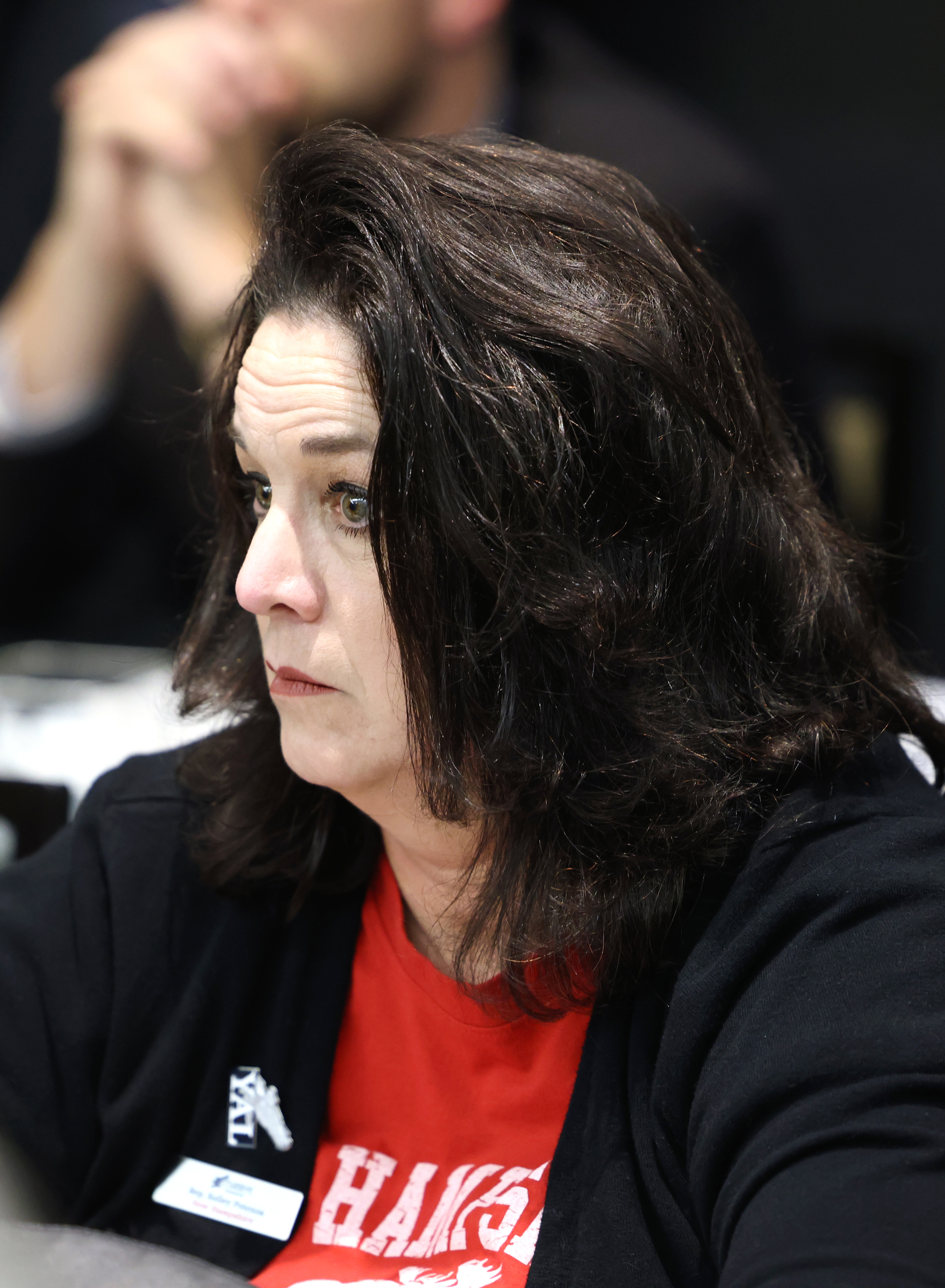

Member of the New Hampshire House of Representatives from the Strafford 19th district
- Incumbent
- Assumed office December 7, 2022

Personal details
- Party: Republican

Kelley Potenza is an American politician. She serves as a Republican member for the Strafford 19th district of the New Hampshire House of Representatives.
