= Mary Ngwanda Georges =

American politician

Member of New Hampshire House of Representatives for Hillsborough 23
- Incumbent
- Assumed office December 4, 2024

Personal details
- Party: Democratic

Mary Ngwanda Georges is a Congo-born American politician. She is a member of the New Hampshire House of Representatives.

== Biography ==
She was born in Fatundu, a small town in Bandundu Province, Democratic Republic of the Congo. She completed nursing training and moved to the United States in 1990.

She was a member of the Manchester Board of School Committee. She is the founder of Victory Women of Vision. She endorsed the Bernie Sanders 2020 presidential campaign.
