= Steven Bogert =

American politician

Member of the New Hampshire House of Representatives from the Belknap 5th district
- Incumbent
- Assumed office December 7, 2022

Personal details
- Party: Republican

Steven Bogert is an American politician. He serves as a Republican member for the Belknap 5th district of the New Hampshire House of Representatives.
