= Cindy Bennett =

American politician

Member of New Hampshire House of Representatives for Rockingham 4
- Incumbent
- Assumed office December 4, 2024

Personal details
- Party: Republican

Cindy L. Bennett is an American politician. She is a member of the New Hampshire House of Representatives.

She has worked as a math teacher at Christian schools.
