= Julie Miles =

American politician

Member of New Hampshire House of Representatives for Hillsborough 12
- Incumbent
- Assumed office December 4, 2024

Personal details
- Party: Republican
- Website: votejuliemiles.org

Julie Miles is an American politician. She is a member of the New Hampshire House of Representatives. She is a registered nurse.
