= Terri O'Rorke =

American politician

Member of New Hampshire House of Representatives for Cheshire 7
- Incumbent
- Assumed office December 4, 2024
- Preceded by: Shaun Filiault

Personal details
- Party: Democratic
- Website: democracynh.com

Teresa "Terri" O'Rorke is an American politician. She is a member of the New Hampshire House of Representatives.

O'Rorke is a former deputy town clerk and trust fund trustee in Richmond, New Hampshire.

O'Rorke is a retired hairdresser and has two daughters and six grandchildren.
