= Trinidad Tellez =

American politician

Member of the New Hampshire House of Representatives from the Hillsborough 40th district
- Incumbent
- Assumed office December 7, 2022

Personal details
- Party: Democratic
- Education: Harvard College (BA); Dartmouth College (MD)

Trinidad Tellez is an American politician. She serves as a Democratic member for the Hillsborough 40th district of the New Hampshire House of Representatives.
