= Calvin Beaulier =

American politician

Member of New Hampshire House of Representatives from the Grafton 1st district
- Incumbent
- Assumed office December 4, 2024

Personal details
- Born: Houston, Texas
- Party: Republican
- Children: 3
- Education: American University (BA); Louisiana State University (JD)
- Website: calvinbeaulier.com

Calvin Beaulier is an American attorney, real estate broker, and politician serving as a Republican member of the New Hampshire House of Representatives representing the Grafton, New Hampshire, 1st district. He represents the towns of Bath, Lisbon, Littleton, Lyman, Monroe, and Sugar Hill.

== Early life ==
Beaulier received a Bachelor of Arts in international studies from American University, and later received his Juris Doctor from Louisiana State University.

== Personal life ==
Beaulier resides in Littleton, New Hampshire.
