= Jessica LaMontagne =

American politician

Member of the New Hampshire House of Representatives from the Strafford 17th district
- Incumbent
- Assumed office December 7, 2022

Personal details
- Party: Democratic

Jessica LaMontagne is an American politician. She serves as a Democratic member for the Strafford 17th district of the New Hampshire House of Representatives.
