= John Suiter =

American politician

Member of New Hampshire House of Representatives for Hillsborough 36
- Incumbent
- Assumed office December 4, 2024
- Succeeded by: Steve Spratt (elect)

Personal details
- Party: Republican

John W. Suiter is an American politician. He is a member of the New Hampshire House of Representatives. He has represented Hillsborough District 36 since 2024.

Suiter is a select board member in Mason, New Hampshire.
