= Lee Ann Kluger =

American politician

Member of New Hampshire House of Representatives for Hillsborough 6
- Incumbent
- Assumed office December 4, 2024

Personal details
- Party: Democratic
- Education: Lesley University

Lee Ann Kluger is an American politician. She is a member of the New Hampshire House of Representatives.

Kluger graduated from Lesley University. She is an elementary school teacher by profession.
