= Michela Hites =

American politician

Member of the New Hampshire House of Representatives from the Rockingham 16th district
- Incumbent
- Assumed office December 2026

Personal details
- Party: Democratic

Michela Hites is an American politician. A member of the Democratic Party, she is the member-elect for the Rockingham 16th district of the New Hampshire House of Representatives.
