= Sanjeev Manohar =

American politician

Member of New Hampshire House of Representatives for Hillsborough County's 9th district
- Incumbent
- Assumed office December 4, 2024

Personal details
- Born: India
- Party: Democratic
- Education: University of Madras (BS Chemistry, MS Physical Chemistry); Southern Illinois University Carbondale (MS Organic Chemistry); University of Pennsylvania (PhD Organic Chemistry)
- Website: sanjeevmanohar.com

Sanjeev K. Manohar is an American politician. He is a member of the New Hampshire House of Representatives. Manohar is Indian-American.
