= Lily Foss =

American politician

Lily M. Foss

Member of New Hampshire House of Representatives for Hillsborough 41
- Incumbent
- Assumed office December 4, 2024

Personal details
- Born: Manchester, New Hampshire, U.S.
- Party: Democratic
- Education: Scripps College

Lily M. Foss is an American politician. She is a member of the New Hampshire House of Representatives.

Her family has lived in Manchester, New Hampshire since 1905. Foss graduated from Scripps College in 2013 with a dual degree in Politics and Gender & Women's Studies.
