= Allison Knab =

American politician

Member of the New Hampshire House of Representatives from the Rockingham 12th district
- Incumbent
- Assumed office December 7, 2022

Personal details
- Party: Democratic

Allison Knab is an American politician. She serves as a Democratic member for the Rockingham 12th district of the New Hampshire House of Representatives. She is currently the ranking member on the Resources, Recreation and Development Committee.

Allison also serves on the Stratham Select Board as the Vice Chair and is the Executive Director of the non-profit Great Bay Stewards. She is a graduate of the University of Virginia and lives in Stratham with her husband and two daughters.
