= Katelyn Kuttab =

New Hampshire state Representative

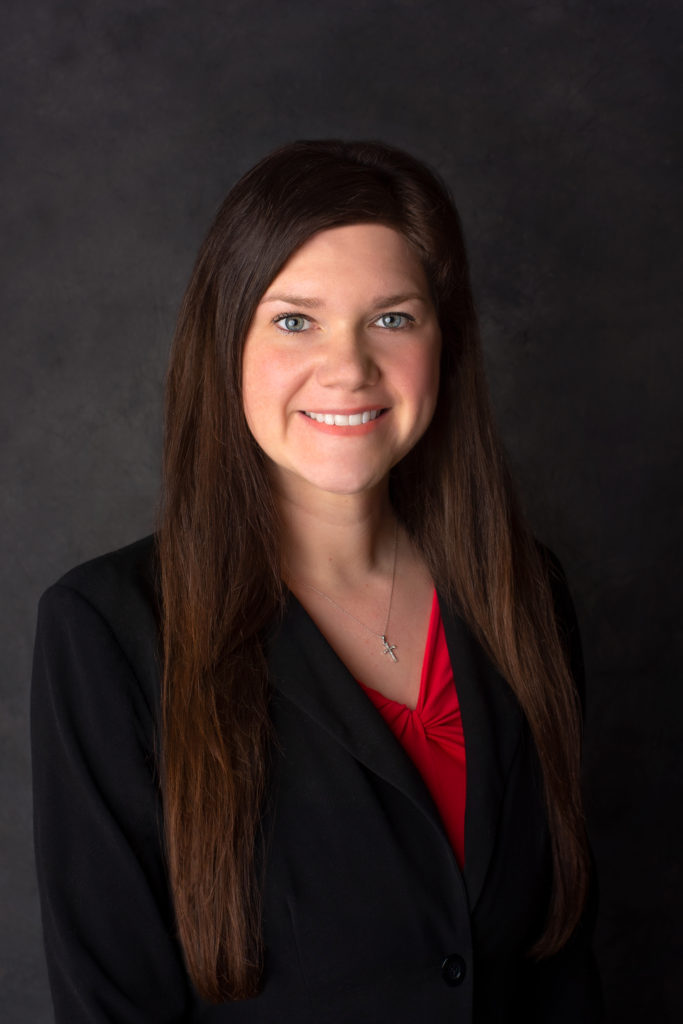

Member of the New Hampshire House of Representatives from the Rockingham 17th district
- Incumbent
- Assumed office December 7, 2022
- Preceded by: Mary Griffin

Personal details
- Party: Republican
- Spouse: Johny Kuttab
- Children: 4
- Education: Florida Institute of Technology
- Website: kkuttab.com

Katelyn T. Kuttab is an American politician. She is a Republican member of the New Hampshire House of Representatives. She represents Rockingham District 17, which consists of the town of Windham. She was first elected on November 8, 2022.
