= David Paige (New Hampshire politician) =

American politician

Member of the New Hampshire House of Representatives from the Carroll 1st district
- Incumbent
- Assumed office December 7, 2022

Personal details
- Party: Democratic

David Paige is an American politician. He serves as a Democratic member for the Carroll, 1st district of the New Hampshire House of Representatives.
