= Wayne Pearson =

American politician

Member of New Hampshire House of Representatives for Strafford County's 12th district
- Incumbent
- Assumed office December 4, 2024

Personal details
- Party: Democratic

Wayne Pearson is an American politician. He is a member of the New Hampshire House of Representatives. His district contains areas of Rollinsford and Somersworth.

Pearson is a retired commercial photographer.
