= Denise Riley (politician) =

American politician

Member of the New Hampshire House of Representatives from the Belknap 5th district
- Incumbent
- Assumed office December 2026

Personal details
- Party: Democratic

Denise Riley is an American politician. A member of the Democratic Party, she is the member-elect for the Belknap 5th district of the New Hampshire House of Representatives.
