= Samantha Jacobs =

American politician

Member of New Hampshire House of Representatives for Cheshire 15
- Incumbent
- Assumed office December 4, 2024

Personal details
- Party: Democratic

Samantha Jacobs is an American politician. She is a member of the New Hampshire House of Representatives.

Jacobs was raised in the town of Fitzwilliam, New Hampshire.
