= Tracy Bricchi =

American politician

Member of New Hampshire House of Representatives for Merrimack 15
- Incumbent
- Assumed office December 4, 2024
- Preceded by: Stephen Shurtleff

Personal details
- Party: Democratic
- Website: bricchinh.com

Tracy Anne Bricchi is an American politician. She is a member of the New Hampshire House of Representatives. Bricchi is a retired public school educator.
