= Rita Mattson =

American politician

Member of New Hampshire House of Representatives for Cheshire 18
- Incumbent
- Assumed office December 4, 2024

Personal details
- Born: Atkinson, New Hampshire, U.S.
- Party: Republican
- Website: www.ritamattson.com

Rita Mattson is an American politician. She is a member of the New Hampshire House of Representatives.

Mattson is chair of the GOP in the towns of Dublin, Harrisville and Marlborough. Rita Mattson is a retired blue-collar worker.
