= Lorie Ball =

American politician

Member of the New Hampshire House of Representatives from the Rockingham 25th district
- Incumbent
- Assumed office December 7, 2022

Personal details
- Party: Republican

Lorie Ball is an American politician. She serves as a Republican member for the Rockingham 25th district of the New Hampshire House of Representatives.
