= Seth King (politician) =

American politician

Member of the New Hampshire House of Representatives from the Coos 4th district
- Incumbent
- Assumed office December 7, 2022

Personal details
- Party: Republican

Seth King is an American politician. He serves as a Republican member for the Coos 4th district of the New Hampshire House of Representatives.

== Views ==
King opposes gender affirming care to transgender youth under the age of 18, arguing that children are unable to consent, may later regret the decision, and that irreversible surgeries or drugs may negative long-term health problems.

== Election ==
King ran unopposed in the primary election, and successfully defeated Democrat Suzy Colt 1,109 votes to 911, winning 54.9% of the votes on November 8, 2022.
