= Susan Porcelli =

American politician

Member of the New Hampshire House of Representatives from the Rockingham 19th district
- Incumbent
- Assumed office December 7, 2022

Personal details
- Party: Republican

Susan M. Porcelli is an American politician. She serves as a Republican member for the Rockingham 19th district of the New Hampshire House of Representatives.

She earned a BS biology cum laude, Montclair State University.
