= Manoj Chourasia =

American politician

Member of the New Hampshire House of Representatives from the Hillsborough 11th district
- Incumbent
- Assumed office December 4, 2024
- Preceded by: Latha Mangipudi

Personal details
- Party: Democratic

Manoj Chourasia is an American politician. He serves as a Democratic member for the Hillsborough 11th district of the New Hampshire House of Representatives. He is Indian-American.
