= Erica de Vries =

American politician

Member of New Hampshire House of Representatives for Rockingham 29
- Incumbent
- Assumed office December 4, 2024

Personal details
- Party: Democratic
- Education: University of Maine
- Website: www.devries4nh.com

Erica R. de Vries is an American politician. She is a member of the New Hampshire House of Representatives.
