= Heather Raymond =

American politician

Member of the New Hampshire House of Representatives from the Hillsborough 5th district
- Incumbent
- Assumed office December 7, 2022

Personal details
- Party: Democratic

Heather Raymond is an American politician. She serves as a Democratic member for the Hillsborough 5th district of the New Hampshire House of Representatives.

Raymond has been a member of the Nashua Board of Education since 2018, and served as president of the board from 2019 to 2021.

== Early life ==
Raymond earned a Bachelor of Science in psychology from Worcester State University. She has worked for a variety of child services agencies including the New Hampshire Division for Children, Youth, and Families.
