= Daniel Popovici-Muller =

American politician

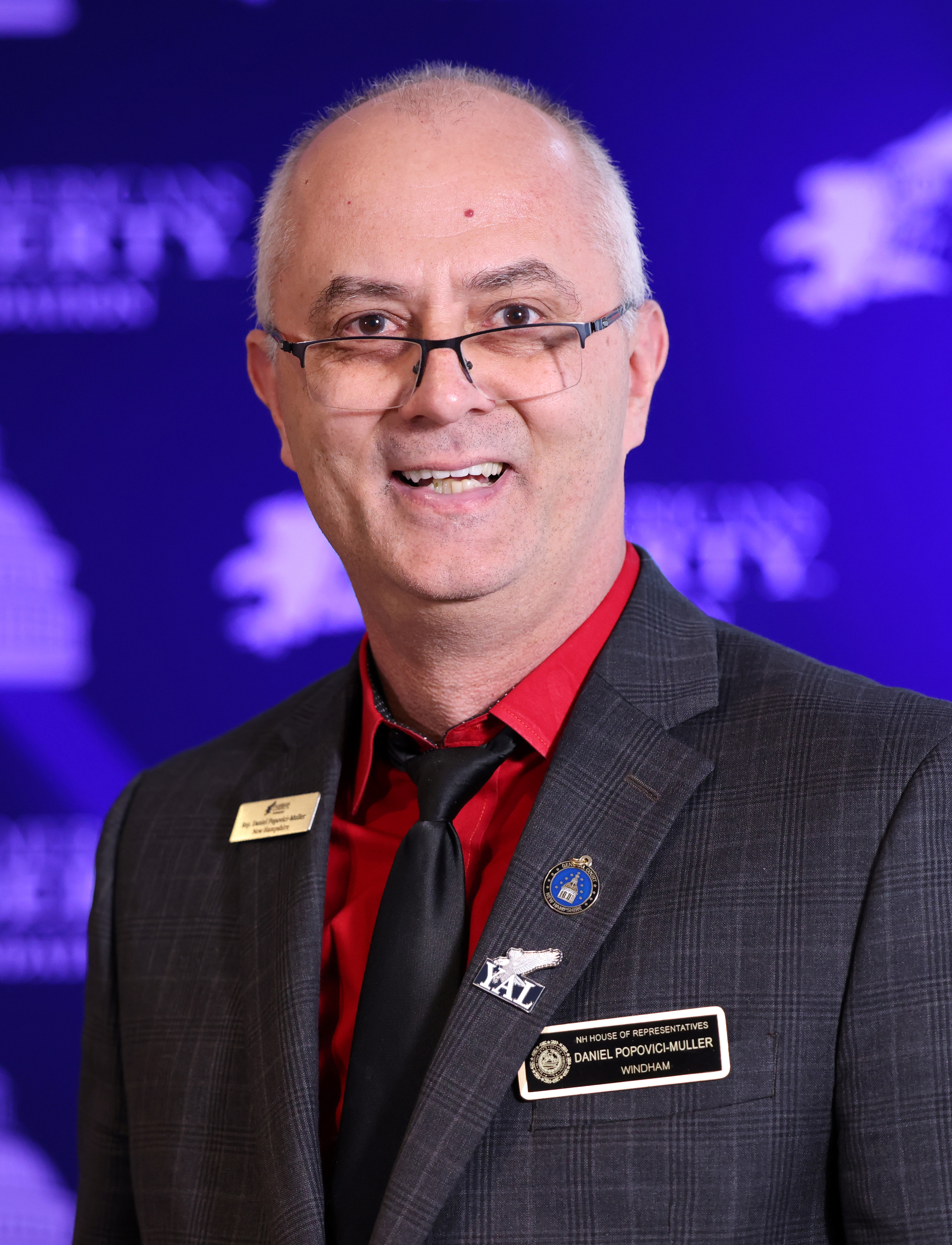
- Popovici-Muller at the 2024 Hazlitt Summit hosted by Young Americans for Liberty Foundation

Member of the New Hampshire House of Representatives from the Rockingham 17th district
- Incumbent
- Assumed office December 7, 2022

Personal details
- Born: Romania
- Party: Republican

Daniel Popovici-Muller is an American politician. He serves as a Republican member for the Rockingham 17th district of the New Hampshire House of Representatives.
