= Tom Schamberg =

American politician

Member of the New Hampshire House of Representatives from the Merrimack 4th district
- Incumbent
- Assumed office December 5, 2018
- Preceded by: Douglas Long
- In office December 2012 – December 2014
- Succeeded by: Douglas Long

Mayor of Orwell, Ohio

Personal details
- Born: December 1946 (age 79)
- Party: Democratic
- Education: Massachusetts School of Law (J.D.)

Thomas Schamberg (born December 1946) is a New Hampshire politician.

== Education ==
Schamberg earned a J.D. from the Massachusetts School of Law in 2006.

== Career ==
Schamberg is a retired teacher. Schamberg served as mayor of Orwell, Ohio, for 14 and a half years. He was elected to the Wilmot, New Hampshire, Board of Selectmen in March 2015 and is now serving his second term. On November 6, 2018, Schamberg was elected to the New Hampshire House of Representatives where he represents the Merrimack 4 district. Schamberg assumed office on December 5, 2018. Schamberg is a Democrat.

On January 6, 2024, Schamberg was selected as a New Hampshire's 2nd congressional district primary delegate for the Dean Phillips 2024 presidential campaign.

== Personal life ==
Schamberg resides in Wilmot, New Hampshire. On May 19, 2005, Schamberg's son, Kurt, died at the age of 26 in a roadside bombing while serving the Iraq War.
