= Santosh Salvi =

American politician

Member of the New Hampshire House of Representatives from the Hillsborough 9th district
- Incumbent
- Assumed office December 4, 2024

Personal details
- Born: India
- Party: Democratic

Santosh Salvi is an American politician. He serves as a Democratic member for the Hillsborough 9th district of the New Hampshire House of Representatives.
