= Mike Ouellet =

American politician

Member of the New Hampshire House of Representatives from the Coos 3rd district
- Incumbent
- Assumed office December 7, 2022

Personal details
- Party: Republican

Mike Ouellet is an American politician. He serves as a Republican member for the Coos 3rd district of the New Hampshire House of Representatives.
