= Geoffrey Smith (New Hampshire politician) =

American politician

Member of the New Hampshire House of Representatives from the Strafford 21st district
- Incumbent
- Assumed office December 7, 2022

Personal details
- Party: Democratic

Geoffrey Smith is an American politician. He serves as a Democratic member for the Strafford 21st district of the New Hampshire House of Representatives.
