= Vicki Wilson (politician) =

American politician

Member of New Hampshire House of Representatives for Rockingham 9
- Incumbent
- Assumed office December 4, 2024

Personal details
- Party: Republican

Vicki Wilson is an American politician. She is a member of the New Hampshire House of Representatives.

Wilson was a member of the Sandown Planning Board for ten years.
