= Wayne Hemingway (politician) =

American politician

Member of New Hampshire House of Representatives for Sullivan County's 6th district
- Incumbent
- Assumed office December 4, 2024

Personal details
- Party: Republican
- Website: wayne4nh.com

Wayne J. Hemingway is an American politician. He is a member of the New Hampshire House of Representatives.
