= Jeremy Slottje =

American politician

Member of New Hampshire House of Representatives for Hillsborough County's 13th district
- Incumbent
- Assumed office December 4, 2024

Personal details
- Party: Republican

Jeremy Slottje is an American politician. He is a member of the New Hampshire House of Representatives.

Slottje represents the town of Hudson, New Hampshire.
