= Will Darby =

American politician

Member of the New Hampshire House of Representatives from the Hillsborough 11th district
- Incumbent
- Assumed office December 7, 2022

Personal details
- Party: Democratic
- Education: Clarkson University; Villanova University

William (Will) Darby is an American politician. He serves as a Democratic member for the Hillsborough 11th district of the New Hampshire House of Representatives.
