= Raymond Peeples =

American politician

Member of New Hampshire House of Representatives for Hillsborough County's 14th district
- Incumbent
- Assumed office December 4, 2024

Personal details
- Born: Buffalo, New York
- Party: Republican
- Website: peeples4staterep.com

Raymond (Ray) C. Peeples Jr. is an American politician. He is a member of the New Hampshire House of Representatives.
