= Peter Lovett =

American politician

Member of the New Hampshire House of Representatives from the Grafton 8th district
- Incumbent
- Assumed office December 7, 2022

Personal details
- Party: Democratic

Peter Lovett is an American politician. He serves as a Democratic member for the Grafton 8th district of the New Hampshire House of Representatives.
