= Dillon Dumont =

American politician

Member of New Hampshire House of Representatives for Hillsborough County's 13th district
- Incumbent
- Assumed office December 4, 2024

Personal details
- Party: Republican

Dillon Dumont is an American politician. He is a member of the New Hampshire House of Representatives.

He is a member of the Board of Selectmen in the town of Hudson, New Hampshire.
