= Toni Weinstein =

American politician

Member of New Hampshire House of Representatives for Rockingham 10
- Incumbent
- Assumed office December 4, 2024

Personal details
- Party: Democratic

Toni Weinstein is an American politician. She is a member of the New Hampshire House of Representatives.

Weinstein attended Torrington High School and Albertus Magnus College. She has held community roles in her hometown of Newmarket, New Hampshire.

She and her husband have two sons.

== Election results ==
New Hampshire House of Representatives for Rockingham 10, Democratic Primary Election 2024
Party	Candidate	Votes	%
Democratic	Ellen Read	1,195	28.3%
Democratic	Toni Weinstein	1,101	26.1%
Democratic	Michael Cahill	984	23.3%
Democratic	Lela Porter Love	940	22.3%
Turnout		4,220	

New Hampshire House of Representatives for Rockingham 10, General Election 2024
Party	Candidate	Votes	%
Democratic	Michael Cahill	4,074	27.9%
Democratic	Ellen Read	3,922	26.8%
Democratic	Toni Weinstein	3,795	26%
Republican	Jeanene Cooper	2,833	19.4%
Turnout		14,624	
