= Darrell Louis =

American politician

Member of New Hampshire House of Representatives for Grafton 1
- Incumbent
- Assumed office December 4, 2024

Personal details
- Party: Republican

Darrell A. Louis is an American politician. He is a member of the New Hampshire House of Representatives.
