= Stephanie Payeur =

American politician

Member of the New Hampshire House of Representatives from the Merrimack 8th district
- Incumbent
- Assumed office December 7, 2022

Personal details
- Party: Democratic

Stephanie Payeur is an American politician. She serves as a Democratic member for the Merrimack 8th district of the New Hampshire House of Representatives. She works in a hospital laboratory.

== Early life ==
Payeur grew up in New Hampshire and graduated from the University of New Hampshire with a Bachelor of Science.
