= Dale Swanson (politician) =

American politician

Member of New Hampshire House of Representatives for Hillsborough County's 5th district
- Incumbent
- Assumed office December 4, 2024

Personal details
- Born: Mankato, Minnesota
- Party: Democratic
- Education: University of Idaho

Dale Swanson is an American politician. He is a member of the New Hampshire House of Representatives.

== Biography ==
Swanson served in the United States Air Force 1981 to 1993, including NATO deployments for six years, and combat duties in Saudi Arabia during the Gulf War. He moved to Hudson, New Hampshire after leaving the Air Force in 1993.
