= Eleana Colby =

American politician

Member of New Hampshire House of Representatives for Merrimack 9
- Incumbent
- Assumed office December 4, 2024

Personal details
- Party: Democratic
- Website: colbyfornh.com

Eleana Marie Colby is an American politician who has been a member of the New Hampshire House of Representatives since 2024.

Colby is married and has five children. She has worked the special education department at Bow High School.
