= Sheri Minor =

American politician from New Hampshire

Member of the New Hampshire House of Representatives from the Belknap 5th district
- Incumbent
- Assumed office December 4, 2024
- Preceded by: David Huot

Personal details
- Party: Republican

Sheri Minor is an American politician. She serves as a Republican member for the Belknap 5th district of the New Hampshire House of Representatives.
