= Eileen Kelly (politician) =

American politician

Member of New Hampshire House of Representatives for Merrimack 8
- Incumbent
- Assumed office December 4, 2024

Personal details
- Party: Democratic

Eileen Kelly is an American politician. She is a member of the New Hampshire House of Representatives. Her district contains the towns of Bradford, Henniker and Warner.

Kelly was Chief of Staff to the New Hampshire Speaker of the House for 2 years.
