= Ellen Rockmore =

American politician

Member of New Hampshire House of Representatives for Grafton 12
- Incumbent
- Assumed office December 4, 2024

Personal details
- Party: Democratic
- Education: Yale College; New York University

Ellen Bresler Rockmore is an American politician. She was elected a member of the New Hampshire House of Representatives in 2024. Her district contains the towns of Hanover and Lyme. Rockmore was a lecturer in the Institute for Writing and Rhetoric at Dartmouth College.
