= Teri Harkins =

American politician

Member of the New Hampshire House of Representatives from the Hillsborough 42nd district
- Incumbent
- Assumed office December 2026

Personal details
- Party: Democratic

Teri Harkins is an American politician. A member of the Democratic Party, she is the member-elect for the Hillsborough 42nd district of the New Hampshire House of Representatives.
