= Andrew Dorsett =

American politician

Member of the New Hampshire House of Representatives from the Grafton 1st district
- Incumbent
- Assumed office December 2026

Personal details
- Party: Republican

Andrew Dorsett is an American politician. A member of the Republican Party, he is the member-elect for the Grafton 1st district of the New Hampshire House of Representatives.
