= Nicholas Germana =

American politician

Member of the New Hampshire House of Representatives from the Cheshire 15th district
- Incumbent
- Assumed office December 4, 2024

Personal details
- Party: Democratic

Nicholas Germana is an American politician. He serves as a Democratic member for the Cheshire 15th district of the New Hampshire House of Representatives. He serves as the Deputy Democratic Floor Leader in the New Hampshire House. Germana is also a professor at Keene State College as a member of the history department.
