= James Guzofski =

American politician

Member of the New Hampshire House of Representatives from the Rockingham 1st district
- Incumbent
- Assumed office December 4, 2024

Personal details
- Party: Republican

James Guzofski is an American politician. He serves as a Republican member for the Rockingham 1st district of the New Hampshire House of Representatives.
