= Linda Ryan (politician) =

American politician

Member of the New Hampshire House of Representatives from the Hillsborough 4th district
- Incumbent
- Assumed office December 7, 2022

Personal details
- Party: Democratic

Linda Ryan is an American politician. She serves as a Democratic member for the Hillsborough 4th district of the New Hampshire House of Representatives.
