= Efstathia Booras =

American politician

Member of the New Hampshire House of Representatives from the Hillsborough 8th district
- Incumbent
- Assumed office December 7, 2022

Member of the New Hampshire House of Representatives from the Hillsborough 33rd district
- In office December 5, 2012 – December 7, 2016
- In office December 2, 2020 – December 7, 2022

Personal details
- Party: Democratic

Efstathia Booras is an American politician. She serves as a Democratic member for the Hillsborough 8th district of the New Hampshire House of Representatives.
