= Seth Miller (politician) =

American politician

Member of New Hampshire House of Representatives for Strafford County's 21st district
- Incumbent
- Assumed office December 4, 2024

Personal details
- Born: Gainesville, Florida
- Party: Democratic
- Website: millerfornh.com

Seth Miller is an American politician and journalist. He is a member of the New Hampshire House of Representatives. His district contains parts of Dover.

As an independent journalist, he writes for PaxEx.Aero covering the aviation industry. Miller also led a billboard campaign against Avelo Airlines for being a contractor for deportation flights for United States Immigrations and Customs Enforcement.
