= Fran Nutter-Upham =

American politician

Member of the New Hampshire House of Representatives from the Hillsborough 33rd district
- Incumbent
- Assumed office December 5, 2018
- Preceded by: Kevin Scully

Personal details
- Party: Democratic

Frances Nutter-Upham is a New Hampshire politician and a Democratic member of the New Hampshire House of Representatives.

== New Hampshire House of Representatives ==
On November 6, 2018, Nutter-Upham was elected to the New Hampshire House of Representatives where she represents the Hillsborough 33 district.

Nutter-Upham endorsed Bernie Sanders in the 2020 Democratic Party presidential primaries.

== Personal life ==
Nutter-Upham resides in Nashua, New Hampshire. She is married and has four children.
