= Travis Toner =

American politician

Member of the New Hampshire House of Representatives from the Belknap 4th district
- Incumbent
- Assumed office December 4, 2024
- Preceded by: Travis O'Hara

Personal details
- Party: Republican

Travis Toner is an American politician. He serves as a Republican member for the Belknap 4th district of the New Hampshire House of Representatives.
