= Michael Granger (politician) =

American politician

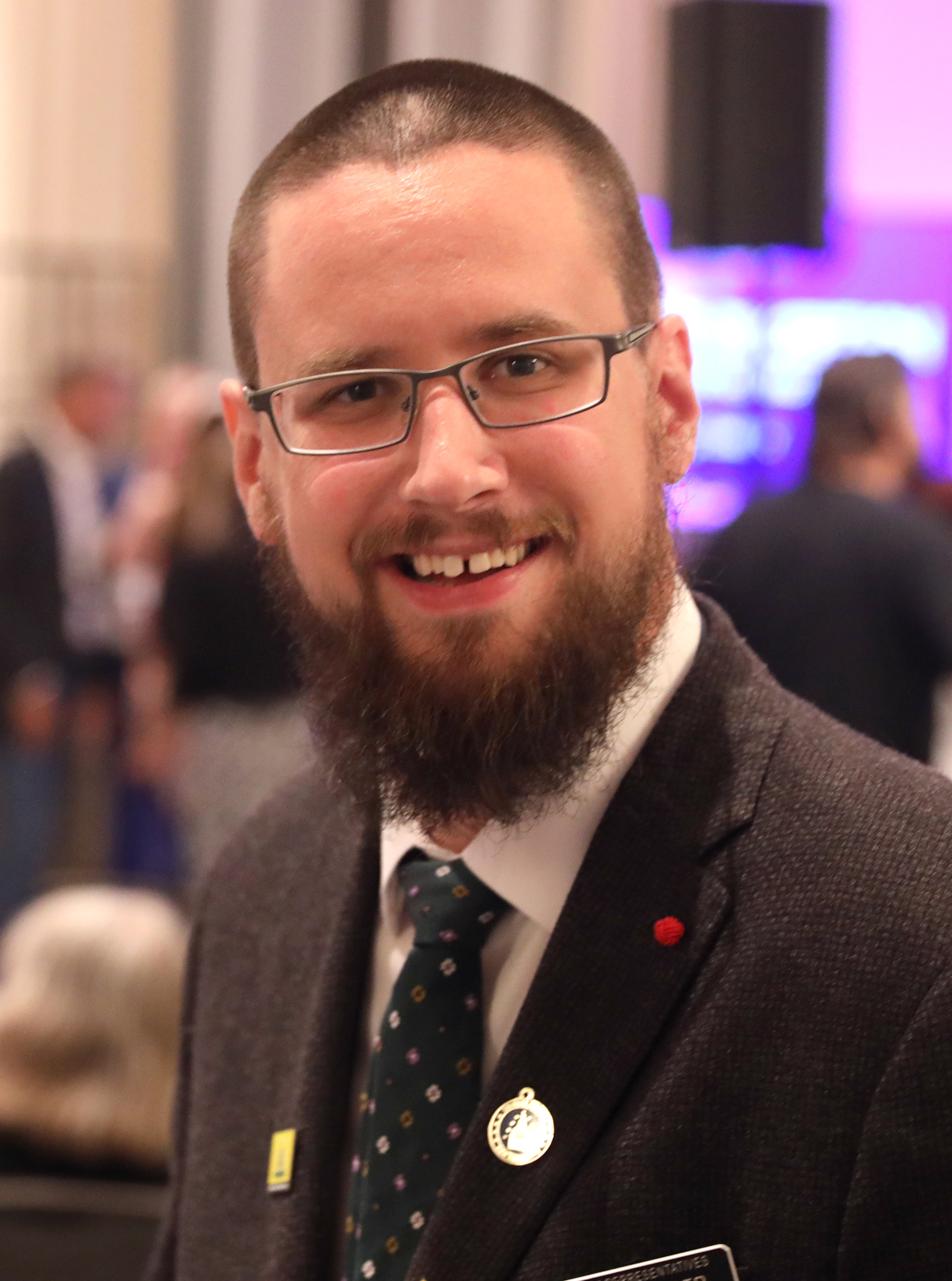

Member of the New Hampshire House of Representatives from the Strafford 2nd district
- Incumbent
- Assumed office December 7, 2022

Personal details
- Party: Republican

Michael Granger is an American politician. He serves as a Republican member for the Strafford 2nd district of the New Hampshire House of Representatives. He is also a former board member of the New Hampshire Liberty Alliance.

He is best known for being the prime sponsor of a bill to eliminate motor vehicle inspections within the state of New Hampshire. This bill was eventually incorporated into the budget and signed by Governor Kelly Ayotte.
