= Results of the 2022 New Hampshire House of Representatives election =

2022 New Hampshire House of Representatives election
- November 8, 2022

All 400 seats in the New Hampshire House of Representatives 201 seats needed for a majority
| Leader | Sherman Packard | David Cote |
| Party | Republican | Democratic |
| Leader's seat | Rockingham 5 (running in Rockingham 16) | Hillsborough 31 (running in Hillsborough 3) |
| Last election | 213 seats, 50.9% | 187 seats, 48.9% |
| Current seats | 206 | 181 |
| Seats needed | Steady | ▲19 |
Incumbent Speaker
Sherman Packard
Republican

== Cheshire County ==
=== Cheshire 1 ===
- Elects one representative.

Democratic primary

Cheshire 1 Democratic primary
| Party | Candidate | Votes | % |
|---|---|---|---|
| Democratic | Nicholas Germana | 289 | 100.0 |
| Total votes | | 289 | 100.0 |

Republican primary

Cheshire 1 Republican primary
| Party | Candidate | Votes | % |
|---|---|---|---|
| Republican | Aria DiMezzo | 60 | 75.9 |
| Write-in | Write-ins | 19 | 24.1 |
| Total votes | | 79 | 100.0 |

General election

Cheshire 1 general election, 2022
| Party | Candidate | Votes | % |
|---|---|---|---|
| Democratic | Nicholas Germana | 1,095 | 79.5 |
| Republican | Aria DiMezzo | 272 | 19.7 |
| Write-in | Write-ins | 11 | 0.8 |
| Total votes | | 1,378 | 100.0 |

=== Cheshire 2 ===
- Elects one representative.

Democratic primary

Cheshire 2 Democratic primary
| Party | Candidate | Votes | % |
|---|---|---|---|
| Democratic | Dru Fox (incumbent) | 438 | 98.9 |
| Write-in | Write-ins | 5 | 1.1 |
| Total votes | | 443 | 100.0 |

Republican primary

Cheshire 2 Republican primary
| Party | Candidate | Votes | % |
|---|---|---|---|
| Republican | Wesley Felix | 150 | 98.7 |
| Write-in | Write-ins | 2 | 1.3 |
| Total votes | | 152 | 100.0 |

General election

Cheshire 2 general election, 2022
| Party | Candidate | Votes | % |
|---|---|---|---|
| Democratic | Dru Fox (incumbent) | 1,289 | 70.9 |
| Republican | Wesley Felix | 529 | 29.1 |
| Total votes | | 1,818 | 100.0 |

=== Cheshire 3 ===
- Elects one representative.

Democratic primary

Cheshire 3 Democratic primary
| Party | Candidate | Votes | % |
|---|---|---|---|
| Democratic | Philip Jones | 550 | 99.6 |
| Write-in | Write-ins | 2 | 0.4 |
| Total votes | | 552 | 100.0 |

Republican primary

Cheshire 3 Republican primary
| Party | Candidate | Votes | % |
|---|---|---|---|
| Republican | Jerry Sickels | 193 | 99.0 |
| Write-in | Write-ins | 2 | 1.0 |
| Total votes | | 195 | 100.0 |

General election

Cheshire 3 general election, 2022
| Party | Candidate | Votes | % |
|---|---|---|---|
| Democratic | Philip Jones | 1,484 | 69.9 |
| Republican | Jerry Sickels | 636 | 30.0 |
| Write-in | Write-ins | 3 | 0.1 |
| Total votes | | 2,123 | 100.0 |

=== Cheshire 4 ===
- Elects one representative.

Democratic primary

Cheshire 4 Democratic primary
| Party | Candidate | Votes | % |
|---|---|---|---|
| Democratic | Jodi Newell | 494 | 99.6 |
| Write-in | Write-ins | 2 | 0.4 |
| Total votes | | 496 | 100.0 |

Republican primary

Cheshire 4 Republican primary
| Party | Candidate | Votes | % |
|---|---|---|---|
| Republican | Thomas Savastano | 170 | 71.1 |
| Republican | Matthew Roach | 66 | 27.6 |
| Write-in | Write-ins | 3 | 1.3 |
| Total votes | | 239 | 100.0 |

General election

Cheshire 4 general election, 2022
| Party | Candidate | Votes | % |
|---|---|---|---|
| Democratic | Jodi Newell | 1,276 | 66.8 |
| Republican | Thomas Savastano | 633 | 33.1 |
| Write-in | Write-ins | 1 | 0.1 |
| Total votes | | 1,910 | 100.0 |

=== Cheshire 5 ===
- Elects one representative.

Democratic primary

Cheshire 5 Democratic primary
| Party | Candidate | Votes | % |
|---|---|---|---|
| Democratic | Lucy Weber (incumbent) | 438 | 100.0 |
| Total votes | | 438 | 100.0 |

Republican primary

Cheshire 5 Republican primary
| Party | Candidate | Votes | % |
|---|---|---|---|
| Republican | John Winter | 264 | 98.9 |
| Write-in | Write-ins | 3 | 1.1 |
| Total votes | | 267 | 100.0 |

General election

Cheshire 5 general election, 2022
| Party | Candidate | Votes | % |
|---|---|---|---|
| Democratic | Lucy Weber (incumbent) | 1,439 | 62.9 |
| Republican | John Winter | 847 | 37.0 |
| Write-in | Write-ins | 3 | 0.1 |
| Total votes | | 2,289 | 100.0 |

=== Cheshire 6 ===
- Elects two representatives.

Democratic primary

Cheshire 6 Democratic primary
| Party | Candidate | Votes | % |
|---|---|---|---|
| Democratic | Cathryn Harvey (incumbent) | 696 | 50.9 |
| Democratic | Michael Abbott (incumbent) | 671 | 49.0 |
| Write-in | Write-ins | 1 | 0.1 |
| Total votes | | 1,368 | 100.0 |

Republican primary

Cheshire 6 Republican primary
| Party | Candidate | Votes | % |
|---|---|---|---|
| Republican | Tony Barton | 477 | 53.1 |
| Republican | Rick Merkt | 415 | 46.2 |
| Democratic | Cathryn Harvey (incumbent) (write-in) | 3 | 0.3 |
| Democratic | Michael Abbott (incumbent) (write-in) | 2 | 0.2 |
| Write-in | Misc. Write-ins | 2 | 0.2 |
| Total votes | | 899 | 100.0 |

General election

Cheshire 6 general election, 2022
| Party | Candidate | Votes | % |
|---|---|---|---|
| Democratic | Michael Abbott (incumbent) | 2,237 | 28.94 |
| Democratic | Cathryn Harvey (incumbent) | 2,176 | 28.15 |
| Republican | Rick Merkt | 1,660 | 21.47 |
| Republican | Tony Barton | 1,656 | 21.42 |
| Write-in | Write-ins | 1 | 0.01 |
| Total votes | | 7,730 | 100.0 |

=== Cheshire 7 ===
- Elects one representative.

Democratic primary

Cheshire 7 Democratic primary
| Party | Candidate | Votes | % |
|---|---|---|---|
| Democratic | Shaun Filiault | 409 | 74.50 |
| Democratic | John Bordonet (incumbent) | 137 | 24.95 |
| Republican | David Kamm (write-in) | 1 | 0.18 |
| Write-in | Misc. Write-ins | 2 | 0.36 |
| Total votes | | 549 | 100.0 |

Republican primary

Cheshire 7 Republican primary
| Party | Candidate | Votes | % |
|---|---|---|---|
| Republican | David Kamm | 157 | 98.7 |
| Democratic | Shaun Filiault (write-in) | 1 | 0.6 |
| Write-in | Misc. Write-ins | 1 | 0.6 |
| Total votes | | 159 | 100.0 |

General election

Cheshire 7 general election, 2022
| Party | Candidate | Votes | % |
|---|---|---|---|
| Democratic | Shaun Filiault | 1,409 | 73.89 |
| Republican | David Kamm | 497 | 26.06 |
| Write-in | Write-ins | 1 | 0.05 |
| Total votes | | 1,907 | 100.0 |

=== Cheshire 8 ===
- Elects one representative.

Democratic primary

Cheshire 8 Democratic primary
| Party | Candidate | Votes | % |
|---|---|---|---|
| Democratic | Lucius Parshall (incumbent) | 649 | 100.0 |
| Total votes | | 649 | 100.0 |

- No Republican candidates filed to run in the district, a total number of 17 scattered write-in votes in the Republican primary in this district have been counted.

General election

Cheshire 8 general election, 2022
| Party | Candidate | Votes | % |
|---|---|---|---|
| Democratic | Lucius Parshall (incumbent) | 1,745 | 98.4 |
| Write-in | Write-ins | 29 | 1.6 |
| Total votes | | 1,774 | 100.0 |

=== Cheshire 9 ===
- Elects one representative.

Democratic primary

Cheshire 9 Democratic primary
| Party | Candidate | Votes | % |
|---|---|---|---|
| Democratic | Dan Eaton (incumbent) | 425 | 99.3 |
| Republican | Rich Nalevanko (write-in) | 1 | 0.2 |
| Write-in | Misc. Write-ins | 2 | 0.5 |
| Total votes | | 428 | 100.0 |

Republican primary

Cheshire 9 Republican primary
| Party | Candidate | Votes | % |
|---|---|---|---|
| Republican | Rich Nalevanko | 317 | 68.6 |
| Republican | Robert D'Arcy | 142 | 30.7 |
| Write-in | Write-ins | 3 | 0.6 |
| Total votes | | 462 | 100.0 |

General election

Cheshire 9 general election, 2022
| Party | Candidate | Votes | % |
|---|---|---|---|
| Democratic | Dan Eaton (incumbent) | 1,255 | 52.66 |
| Republican | Rich Nalevanko | 1,127 | 47.29 |
| Write-in | Write-ins | 1 | 0.04 |
| Total votes | | 2,383 | 100.0 |

=== Cheshire 10 ===
- Elects two representatives.

Democratic primary

Cheshire 10 Democratic primary
| Party | Candidate | Votes | % |
|---|---|---|---|
| Democratic | Bruce Tatro | 419 | 51.9 |
| Democratic | Barry Faulkner (incumbent) | 386 | 47.8 |
| Republican | Daniel LeClair (write-in) | 1 | 0.1 |
| Write-in | Misc. Write-ins | 2 | 0.2 |
| Total votes | | 808 | 100.0 |

Republican primary

Cheshire 10 Republican primary
| Party | Candidate | Votes | % |
|---|---|---|---|
| Republican | Daniel LeClair | 483 | 53.8 |
| Republican | Michael York | 400 | 44.5 |
| Democratic | Bruce Tatro (write-in) | 3 | 0.3 |
| Democratic | Barry Faulkner (incumbent) (write-in) | 3 | 0.3 |
| Write-in | Misc. Write-ins | 9 | 1.0 |
| Total votes | | 898 | 100.0 |

General election

Cheshire 10 general election, 2022
| Party | Candidate | Votes | % |
|---|---|---|---|
| Democratic | Bruce Tatro | 1,772 | 27.36 |
| Democratic | Barry Faulkner (incumbent) | 1,658 | 25.60 |
| Republican | Daniel LeClair | 1,563 | 24.13 |
| Republican | Michael York | 1,482 | 22.88 |
| Write-in | Write-ins | 2 | 0.03 |
| Total votes | | 6,477 | 100.0 |

=== Cheshire 11 ===
- Elects one representative.

Republican primary

Cheshire 11 Republican primary
| Party | Candidate | Votes | % |
|---|---|---|---|
| Republican | Zachary Nutting | 228 | 63.16 |
| Republican | Max Santonastaso | 130 | 36.01 |
| Democratic | Natalie Quevedo (write-in) | 2 | 0.55 |
| Write-in | Misc. Write-ins | 1 | 0.28 |
| Total votes | | 361 | 100.0 |

Democratic primary

Cheshire 11 Democratic primary
| Party | Candidate | Votes | % |
|---|---|---|---|
| Democratic | Natalie Quevedo | 224 | 97.0 |
| Write-in | Write-ins | 7 | 3.0 |
| Total votes | | 231 | 100.0 |

General election

Cheshire 11 general election, 2022
| Party | Candidate | Votes | % |
|---|---|---|---|
| Republican | Zachary Nutting | 766 | 52.94 |
| Democratic | Natalie Quevedo | 679 | 46.92 |
| Write-in | Write-ins | 2 | 0.14 |
| Total votes | | 1,447 | 100.0 |

=== Cheshire 12 ===
- Elects one representative.

Democratic primary

Cheshire 12 Democratic primary
| Party | Candidate | Votes | % |
|---|---|---|---|
| Democratic | Jack Gettens | 224 | 99.6 |
| Republican | Dick Thackston (write-in) | 1 | 0.4 |
| Total votes | | 225 | 100.0 |

Republican primary

Cheshire 12 Republican primary
| Party | Candidate | Votes | % |
|---|---|---|---|
| Republican | Dick Thackston | 309 | 99.4 |
| Write-in | Write-ins | 2 | 0.6 |
| Total votes | | 311 | 100.0 |

General election

Cheshire 12 general election, 2022
| Party | Candidate | Votes | % |
|---|---|---|---|
| Republican | Dick Thackston | 1,046 | 54.79 |
| Democratic | Jack Gettens | 860 | 45.05 |
| Write-in | Write-ins | 3 | 0.16 |
| Total votes | | 1,909 | 100.0 |

=== Cheshire 13 ===
- Elects one representative.

Democratic primary

Cheshire 13 Democratic primary
| Party | Candidate | Votes | % |
|---|---|---|---|
| Democratic | Richard Ames (incumbent) | 589 | 100.0 |
| Total votes | | 589 | 100.0 |

Republican primary

Cheshire 13 Republican primary
| Party | Candidate | Votes | % |
|---|---|---|---|
| Republican | Rita Mattson | 466 | 69.6 |
| Republican | Christopher Mazerall | 120 | 17.9 |
| Republican | Donald Primrose | 83 | 12.4 |
| Democratic | Richard Ames (incumbent) (write-in) | 1 | 0.1 |
| Total votes | | 670 | 100.0 |

General election

Cheshire 13 general election, 2022
| Party | Candidate | Votes | % |
|---|---|---|---|
| Democratic | Richard Ames (incumbent) | 1,776 | 53.77 |
| Republican | Rita Mattson | 1,525 | 46.17 |
| Write-in | Write-ins | 2 | 0.06 |
| Total votes | | 3,303 | 100.0 |

=== Cheshire 14 ===
- Elects one representative.

Republican primary

Cheshire 14 Republican primary
| Party | Candidate | Votes | % |
|---|---|---|---|
| Republican | John B. Hunt (incumbent) | 649 | 99.4 |
| Write-in | Write-ins | 4 | 0.6 |
| Total votes | | 653 | 100.0 |

Democratic primary

Cheshire 14 Democratic primary
| Party | Candidate | Votes | % |
|---|---|---|---|
| Democratic | Hannah Bissex | 293 | 99.32 |
| Republican | John B. Hunt (incumbent) (write-in) | 1 | 0.34 |
| Write-in | Misc. Write-ins | 1 | 0.34 |
| Total votes | | 295 | 100.0 |

General election

Cheshire 14 general election, 2022
| Party | Candidate | Votes | % |
|---|---|---|---|
| Republican | John B. Hunt (incumbent) | 1,766 | 63.16 |
| Democratic | Hannah Bissex | 1,028 | 36.77 |
| Write-in | Write-ins | 2 | 0.07 |
| Total votes | | 2,796 | 100.0 |

=== Cheshire 15 ===
- Elects two representatives.

Democratic primary

Cheshire 15 Democratic primary
| Party | Candidate | Votes | % |
|---|---|---|---|
| Democratic | Amanda Toll (incumbent) | 2,193 | 41.55 |
| Democratic | Renee Monteil | 1,602 | 30.35 |
| Democratic | Paul Berch (incumbent) | 1,472 | 27.89 |
| Republican | Joseph Mirzoeff (write-in) | 1 | 0.02 |
| Write-in | Misc. Write-ins | 10 | 0.19 |
| Total votes | | 5,278 | 100.0 |

Republican primary

Cheshire 15 Republican primary
| Party | Candidate | Votes | % |
|---|---|---|---|
| Republican | John Schmitt | 955 | 41.50 |
| Republican | Joseph Mirzoeff | 684 | 29.3 |
| Republican | Malia Boaz | 643 | 27.94 |
| Democratic | Paul Berch (incumbent) (write-in) | 6 | 0.26 |
| Democratic | Amanda Toll (incumbent) (write-in) | 2 | 0.09 |
| Democratic | Renee Monteil | 1 | 0.04 |
| Write-in | Misc. Write-ins | 10 | 0.43 |
| Total votes | | 2,301 | 100.0 |

General election

Cheshire 15 general election, 2022
| Party | Candidate | Votes | % |
|---|---|---|---|
| Democratic | Amanda Toll (incumbent) | 8,585 | 33.74 |
| Democratic | Renee Monteil | 8,022 | 31.53 |
| Republican | John Schmitt | 4,647 | 18.27 |
| Republican | Joseph Mirzoeff | 4,171 | 16.39 |
| Write-in | Write-ins | 16 | 0.06 |
| Total votes | | 25,441 | 100.0 |

=== Cheshire 16 ===
- Elects one representative.

Democratic primary

Cheshire 16 Democratic primary
| Party | Candidate | Votes | % |
|---|---|---|---|
| Democratic | Joe Schapiro (incumbent) | 1,589 | 99.75 |
| Republican | Fred Ward (write-in) | 1 | 0.06 |
| Write-in | Misc. Write-ins | 3 | 0.19 |
| Total votes | | 1,593 | 100.0 |

Republican primary

Cheshire 16 Republican primary
| Party | Candidate | Votes | % |
|---|---|---|---|
| Republican | Fred Ward | 801 | 99.01 |
| Democratic | Joe Schapiro (incumbent) (write-in) | 1 | 0.12 |
| Write-in | Misc. Write-ins | 7 | 0.87 |
| Total votes | | 809 | 100.0 |

General election

Cheshire 16 general election, 2022
| Party | Candidate | Votes | % |
|---|---|---|---|
| Democratic | Joe Schapiro (incumbent) | 4,196 | 63.35 |
| Republican | Fred Ward | 2,424 | 36.59 |
| Write-in | Write-ins | 4 | 0.06 |
| Total votes | | 6,624 | 100.0 |

=== Cheshire 17 ===
- Elects one representative.

Republican primary

Cheshire 17 Republican primary
| Party | Candidate | Votes | % |
|---|---|---|---|
| Republican | Jennifer Rhodes (incumbent) | 1,266 | 99.69 |
| Democratic | Renee Murphy (write-in) | 2 | 0.15 |
| Write-in | Misc. Write-ins | 2 | 0.15 |
| Total votes | | 1,270 | 100.0 |

Democratic primary

Cheshire 17 Democratic primary
| Party | Candidate | Votes | % |
|---|---|---|---|
| Democratic | Renee Murphy | 906 | 99.7 |
| Republican | Jennifer Rhodes (incumbent) (write-in) | 2 | 0.2 |
| Write-in | Misc. Write-ins | 1 | 0.1 |
| Total votes | | 909 | 100.0 |

General election

Cheshire 17 general election, 2022
| Party | Candidate | Votes | % |
|---|---|---|---|
| Republican | Jennifer Rhodes (incumbent) | 3,792 | 55.22 |
| Democratic | Renee Murphy | 3,070 | 44.71 |
| Write-in | Write-ins | 5 | 0.07 |
| Total votes | | 6,867 | 100.0 |

=== Cheshire 18 ===
- Elects two representatives.

Republican primary

Cheshire 18 Republican primary
| Party | Candidate | Votes | % |
|---|---|---|---|
| Republican | Jim Qualey (incumbent) | 944 | 54.00 |
| Republican | Matthew Santonastaso (incumbent) | 795 | 45.48 |
| Democratic | Jeffrey Dickler (write-in) | 2 | 0.11 |
| Democratic | John McCarthy (write-in) | 1 | 0.06 |
| Write-in | Misc. Write-ins | 6 | 0.34 |
| Total votes | | 1,748 | 100.0 |

Democratic primary

Cheshire 18 Democratic primary
| Party | Candidate | Votes | % |
|---|---|---|---|
| Democratic | John McCarthy | 766 | 50.30 |
| Democratic | Jeffrey Dickler | 752 | 49.38 |
| Republican | Matthew Santonastaso (incumbent) (write-in) | 1 | 0.07 |
| Write-in | Misc. Write-ins | 4 | 0.26 |
| Total votes | | 1,523 | 100.0 |

General election

Cheshire 18 general election, 2022
| Party | Candidate | Votes | % |
|---|---|---|---|
| Republican | Jim Qualey (incumbent) | 2,927 | 25.95 |
| Republican | Matthew Santonastaso (incumbent) | 2,917 | 25.86 |
| Democratic | John McCarthy | 2,811 | 24.92 |
| Democratic | Jeffrey Dickler | 2,621 | 23.24 |
| Write-in | Write-ins | 4 | 0.04 |
| Total votes | | 11,280 | 100.0 |

== Coös County ==
=== Coös 1 ===
- Elects two representatives.

Republican primary

Coös 1 Republican primary
| Party | Candidate | Votes | % |
|---|---|---|---|
| Republican | Troy Merner (incumbent) | 455 | 57.0 |
| Republican | James Tierney | 340 | 42.6 |
| Democratic | Cathleen Fountain (write-in) | 3 | 0.4 |
| Write-in | Misc. Write-ins | 8 | 1.0 |
| Total votes | | 806 | 100.0 |

Democratic primary

Coös 1 Democratic primary
| Party | Candidate | Votes | % |
|---|---|---|---|
| Democratic | Cathleen Fountain | 250 | 94.7 |
| Republican | Troy Merner (incumbent) (write-in) | 8 | 3.0 |
| Republican | James Tierney (write-in) | 2 | 0.8 |
| Write-in | Misc. Write-ins | 4 | 1.5 |
| Total votes | | 264 | 100.0 |

General election

Coös 1 general election, 2022
| Party | Candidate | Votes | % |
|---|---|---|---|
| Republican | Troy Merner (incumbent) | 1,446 | 36.67 |
| Republican | James Tierney | 1,380 | 35.00 |
| Democratic | Cathleen Fountain | 1,110 | 28.15 |
| Write-in | Write-ins | 7 | 0.18 |
| Total votes | | 3,943 | 100.0 |

=== Coös 2 ===
- Elects one representative.

Republican primary

Coös 2 Republican primary
| Party | Candidate | Votes | % |
|---|---|---|---|
| Republican | Arnold Davis (incumbent) | 473 | 99.0 |
| Democratic | Katie Doherty (write-in) | 3 | 0.6 |
| Write-in | Misc. Write-ins | 2 | 0.4 |
| Total votes | | 478 | 100.0 |

Democratic primary

Coös 2 Democratic primary
| Party | Candidate | Votes | % |
|---|---|---|---|
| Democratic | Katie Doherty | 162 | 100.0 |
| Total votes | | 162 | 100.0 |

General election

Coös 2 general election, 2022
| Party | Candidate | Votes | % |
|---|---|---|---|
| Republican | Arnold Davis (incumbent) | 1,180 | 65.2 |
| Democratic | Katie Doherty | 628 | 34.7 |
| Write-in | Write-ins | 2 | 0.1 |
| Total votes | | 1,810 | 100.0 |

=== Coös 3 ===
- Elects one representative.

Republican primary

Coös 3 Republican primary
| Party | Candidate | Votes | % |
|---|---|---|---|
| Republican | Mike Ouellet | 294 | 51.1 |
| Republican | Gary Whitehill | 277 | 48.2 |
| Write-in | Write-ins | 4 | 0.7 |
| Total votes | | 575 | 100.0 |

- No other candidates filed to run in the district, and in the Democratic primary, with 30 votes cast, Mike Ouellet and Gary Whitehill got 19 and 8 votes respectively, with the rest three votes being scattered write-in votes.

General election

Coös 3 general election, 2022
| Party | Candidate | Votes | % |
|---|---|---|---|
| Republican | Mike Ouellet | 1,169 | 98.1 |
| Write-in | Write-ins | 23 | 1.9 |
| Total votes | | 1,192 | 100.0 |

=== Coös 4 ===
- Elects one representative.

Republican primary

Coös 4 Republican primary
| Party | Candidate | Votes | % |
|---|---|---|---|
| Republican | Seth King | 451 | 98.26 |
| Democratic | Suzy Colt (write-in) | 4 | 0.87 |
| Write-in | Misc. Write-ins | 4 | 0.87 |
| Total votes | | 459 | 100.0 |

Democratic primary

Coös 4 Democratic primary
| Party | Candidate | Votes | % |
|---|---|---|---|
| Democratic | Suzy Colt | 214 | 99.07 |
| Republican | Seth King (write-in) | 1 | 0.46 |
| Write-in | Misc. Write-ins | 1 | 0.46 |
| Total votes | | 216 | 100.0 |

General election

Coös 4 general election, 2022
| Party | Candidate | Votes | % |
|---|---|---|---|
| Republican | Seth King | 1,109 | 54.87 |
| Democratic | Suzy Colt | 911 | 45.08 |
| Write-in | Write-ins | 1 | 0.05 |
| Total votes | | 2,021 | 100.0 |

=== Coös 5 ===
- Elects two representatives.

Republican primary

Coös 5 Republican primary
| Party | Candidate | Votes | % |
|---|---|---|---|
| Republican | Lori Korzen | 369 | 54.4 |
| Republican | Gaston Gingues | 297 | 43.8 |
| Democratic | Corinne Cascadden (write-in) | 3 | 0.4 |
| Democratic | Henry Noel (write-in) | 2 | 0.3 |
| Write-in | Misc. Write-ins | 7 | 1.0 |
| Total votes | | 678 | 100.0 |

Democratic primary

Coös 5 Democratic primary
| Party | Candidate | Votes | % |
|---|---|---|---|
| Democratic | Corinne Cascadden | 341 | 51.28 |
| Democratic | Henry Noel | 319 | 47.97 |
| Republican | Lori Korzen (write-in) | 4 | 0.60 |
| Republican | Gaston Gingues (write-in) | 1 | 0.15 |
| Total votes | | 665 | 100.0 |

General election

Coös 5 general election, 2022
| Party | Candidate | Votes | % |
|---|---|---|---|
| Democratic | Corinne Cascadden | 1,519 | 28.4 |
| Democratic | Henry Noel | 1,418 | 26.5 |
| Republican | Lori Korzen | 1,361 | 25.5 |
| Republican | Gaston Gingues | 1,048 | 19.6 |
| Total votes | | 5,346 | 100.0 |

=== Coös 6 ===
- Elects one representative

Democratic primary

Coös 6 Democratic primary
| Party | Candidate | Votes | % |
|---|---|---|---|
| Democratic | William Hatch (incumbent) | 200 | 81.63 |
| Democratic | Dan Farland | 42 | 17.14 |
| Republican | Jakob Unger Jr. (write-in) | 3 | 1.22 |
| Total votes | | 245 | 100.0 |

Republican primary

Coös 6 Republican primary
| Party | Candidate | Votes | % |
|---|---|---|---|
| Republican | Jakob Unger Jr. | 241 | 96.4 |
| Democratic | William Hatch (incumbent) (write-in) | 4 | 1.6 |
| Write-in | Misc. Write-ins | 5 | 2.0 |
| Total votes | | 250 | 100.0 |

General election

Coös 6 general election, 2022
| Party | Candidate | Votes | % |
|---|---|---|---|
| Democratic | William Hatch (incumbent) | 998 | 57.99 |
| Republican | Jakob Unger Jr. | 722 | 41.95 |
| Write-in | Misc. Write-ins | 1 | 0.06 |
| Total votes | | 1,721 | 100.0 |

=== Coös 7 ===
- Elects one representative.

Democratic primary

Coös 7 Democratic primary
| Party | Candidate | Votes | % |
|---|---|---|---|
| Democratic | Eamon Kelley (incumbent) | 592 | 99.16 |
| Republican | John Greer (write-in) | 2 | 0.34 |
| Write-in | Misc. Write-ins | 3 | 0.50 |
| Total votes | | 597 | 100.0 |

Republican primary

Coös 7 Republican primary
| Party | Candidate | Votes | % |
|---|---|---|---|
| Republican | John Greer | 846 | 99.06 |
| Democratic | Eamon Kelley (incumbent) (write-in) | 3 | 0.35 |
| Write-in | Misc. Write-ins | 5 | 0.59 |
| Total votes | | 854 | 100.0 |

General election

Coös 7 general election, 2022
| Party | Candidate | Votes | % |
|---|---|---|---|
| Democratic | Eamon Kelley (incumbent) | 2,452 | 50.02 |
| Republican | John Greer | 2,450 | 49.98 |
| Total votes | | 4,902 | 100.0 |

Greer initially led the count on election night by four votes, but a recount put Kelley in the lead by two (With Greer and Kelley getting 2447 and 2443 votes originally, with one vote being a scattered write-in vote).

== Grafton County ==
=== Grafton 1 ===
- Elects three representatives.

Democratic primary

Grafton 1 Democratic primary
| Party | Candidate | Votes | % |
|---|---|---|---|
| Democratic | Linda Massimilla (incumbent) | 498 | 37.1 |
| Democratic | Jordan Applewhite | 428 | 31.8 |
| Democratic | Timothy Egan (incumbent) | 409 | 30.4 |
| Republican | Matthew Simon (write-in) | 3 | 0.2 |
| Republican | David Rochefort (write-in) | 2 | 0.1 |
| Republican | Calvin Beaulier (write-in) | 2 | 0.1 |
| Write-in | Misc. Write-ins | 2 | 0.1 |
| Total votes | | 1,344 | 100.0 |

Republican primary

Grafton 1 Republican primary
| Party | Candidate | Votes | % |
|---|---|---|---|
| Republican | Matthew Simon | 756 | 38.34 |
| Republican | David Rochefort | 643 | 32.61 |
| Republican | Calvin Beaulier | 567 | 28.75 |
| Democratic | Linda Massimilla (incumbent) (write-in) | 1 | 0.05 |
| Democratic | Jordan Applewhite (write-in) | 1 | 0.05 |
| Write-in | Misc. Write-ins | 4 | 0.20 |
| Total votes | | 1,972 | 100.0 |

General election

Grafton 1 general election, 2022
| Party | Candidate | Votes | % |
|---|---|---|---|
| Republican | Matthew Simon | 2,358 | 18.39 |
| Republican | David Rochefort | 2,292 | 17.88 |
| Democratic | Linda Massimilla (incumbent) | 2,171 | 16.93 |
| Republican | Calvin Beaulier | 2,058 | 16.05 |
| Democratic | Jordan Applewhite | 1,984 | 15.47 |
| Democratic | Timothy Egan (incumbent) | 1,958 | 15.27 |
| Write-in | Write-ins | 1 | 0.01 |
| Total votes | | 12,822 | 100.0 |

=== Grafton 2 ===
- Elects one representative

Democratic primary

Grafton 2 Democratic primary
| Party | Candidate | Votes | % |
|---|---|---|---|
| Democratic | Jared Sullivan | 421 | 99.06 |
| Write-in | Write-ins | 4 | 0.94 |
| Total votes | | 425 | 100.0 |

Republican primary

Grafton 2 Republican primary
| Party | Candidate | Votes | % |
|---|---|---|---|
| Republican | Cathy Qi | 231 | 63.64 |
| Republican | Christopher Ford | 131 | 36.09 |
| Write-in | Write-ins | 1 | 0.28 |
| Total votes | | 363 | 100.0 |

General election

Grafton 2 general election, 2022
| Party | Candidate | Votes | % |
|---|---|---|---|
| Democratic | Jared Sullivan | 1,319 | 64.50 |
| Republican | Cathy Qi | 723 | 35.35 |
| Write-in | Write-ins | 3 | 0.15 |
| Total votes | | 2,045 | 100.0 |

=== Grafton 3 ===
- Elects one representative.

Republican primary

Grafton 3 Republican primary
| Party | Candidate | Votes | % |
|---|---|---|---|
| Republican | Bonnie Ham (incumbent) | 194 | 50.0 |
| Republican | Paul Schirduan | 190 | 49.0 |
| Democratic | Jerry Stringham (write-in) | 2 | 0.5 |
| Write-in | Misc. Write-ins | 2 | 0.5 |
| Total votes | | 388 | 100.0 |

Democratic primary

Grafton 3 Democratic primary
| Party | Candidate | Votes | % |
|---|---|---|---|
| Democratic | Jerry Stringham | 245 | 96.46 |
| Republican | Bonnie Ham (incumbent) (write-in) | 4 | 1.57 |
| Write-in | Misc. Write-ins | 5 | 1.97 |
| Total votes | | 254 | 100.0 |

General election

Grafton 3 general election, 2022
| Party | Candidate | Votes | % |
|---|---|---|---|
| Democratic | Jerry Stringham | 862 | 54.97 |
| Republican | Bonnie Ham (incumbent) | 699 | 44.58 |
| Write-in | Write-ins | 7 | 0.45 |
| Total votes | | 1,568 | 100.0 |

=== Grafton 4 ===
- Elects one representative.

Republican primary

Grafton 4 Republican primary
| Party | Candidate | Votes | % |
|---|---|---|---|
| Republican | Steve Babin | 290 | 99.3 |
| Write-in | Write-ins | 2 | 0.7 |
| Total votes | | 292 | 100.0 |

Democratic primary

Grafton 4 Democratic primary
| Party | Candidate | Votes | % |
|---|---|---|---|
| Democratic | Heather Baldwin | 297 | 100.0 |
| Total votes | | 297 | 100.0 |

General election

Grafton 4 general election, 2022
| Party | Candidate | Votes | % |
|---|---|---|---|
| Democratic | Heather Baldwin | 988 | 53.7 |
| Republican | Steve Babin | 851 | 46.3 |
| Total votes | | 1,839 | 100.0 |

=== Grafton 5 ===
- Elects two representatives.

Republican primary

Grafton 5 Republican primary
| Party | Candidate | Votes | % |
|---|---|---|---|
| Republican | Rick Ladd (incumbent) | 568 | 63.1 |
| Republican | Matthew Coulon | 322 | 35.8 |
| Write-in | Write-ins | 10 | 1.1 |
| Total votes | | 900 | 100.0 |

- No other candidates filed to run in the district, and in the Democratic primary in this district, 40 valid votes were cast, 7 of which for Rick Ladd, and the rest of them (33 votes) were scattered write-in votes.

General election

Grafton 5 general election, 2022
| Party | Candidate | Votes | % |
|---|---|---|---|
| Republican | Rick Ladd (incumbent) | 1,903 | 54.36 |
| Republican | Matthew Coulon | 1,560 | 44.56 |
| Write-in | Write-ins | 38 | 1.09 |
| Total votes | | 3,501 | 100.0 |

=== Grafton 6 ===
- Elects one representative.

Republican primary

Grafton 6 Republican primary
| Party | Candidate | Votes | % |
|---|---|---|---|
| Republican | Jeffrey Greeson | 365 | 99.7 |
| Write-in | Write-ins | 1 | 0.3 |
| Total votes | | 366 | 100.0 |

Democratic primary

Grafton 6 Democratic primary
| Party | Candidate | Votes | % |
|---|---|---|---|
| Democratic | Craig Tomlinson | 310 | 99.0 |
| Write-in | Write-ins | 3 | 1.0 |
| Total votes | | 313 | 100.0 |

General election

Grafton 6 general election, 2022
| Party | Candidate | Votes | % |
|---|---|---|---|
| Republican | Jeffrey Greeson | 1,006 | 51.99 |
| Democratic | Craig Tomlinson | 924 | 47.75 |
| Write-in | Write-ins | 5 | 0.26 |
| Total votes | | 1,935 | 100.0 |

=== Grafton 7 ===
- Elects one representative.

Republican primary

Grafton 7 Republican primary
| Party | Candidate | Votes | % |
|---|---|---|---|
| Republican | Mark Alliegro (incumbent) | 357 | 98.3 |
| Write-in | Write-ins | 6 | 1.7 |
| Total votes | | 363 | 100.0 |

Democratic primary

Grafton 7 Democratic primary
| Party | Candidate | Votes | % |
|---|---|---|---|
| Democratic | Tommy Hoyt | 254 | 99.6 |
| Write-in | Write-ins | 1 | 0.4 |
| Total votes | | 255 | 100.0 |

General election

Grafton 7 general election, 2022
| Party | Candidate | Votes | % |
|---|---|---|---|
| Democratic | Tommy Hoyt | 858 | 50.5 |
| Republican | Mark Alliegro (incumbent) | 840 | 49.5 |
| Total votes | | 1,698 | 100.0 |

The results above are the official results after recount, the original results had Tommy Hoyt getting 856 votes, Mark Alligero getting 837 votes, and the rest 4 valid votes being scattered write-in votes.

=== Grafton 8 ===
- Elects three representatives.

Democratic primary

Grafton 8 Democratic primary
| Party | Candidate | Votes | % |
|---|---|---|---|
| Democratic | Sallie Fellows (incumbent) | 708 | 34.9 |
| Democratic | Peter Lovett | 661 | 32.6 |
| Democratic | Bill Bolton | 653 | 32.2 |
| Write-in | Write-ins | 5 | 0.2 |
| Total votes | | 2,027 | 100.0 |

Republican primary

Grafton 8 Republican primary
| Party | Candidate | Votes | % |
|---|---|---|---|
| Republican | Kendall Hughes | 542 | 54.1 |
| Republican | George Kirk | 409 | 40.8 |
| Republican | Mike McLaughlin (write-in) | 33 | 3.3 |
| Democratic | Bill Bolton (write-in) | 3 | 0.3 |
| Democratic | Sallie Fellows (incumbent) (write-in) | 1 | 0.1 |
| Democratic | Peter Lovett (write-in) | 1 | 0.1 |
| Write-in | Misc. Write-ins | 13 | 1.3 |
| Total votes | | 1,002 | 100.0 |

General election

Grafton 8 general election, 2022
| Party | Candidate | Votes | % |
|---|---|---|---|
| Democratic | Sallie Fellows (incumbent) | 2,525 | 21.2 |
| Democratic | Peter Lovett | 2,468 | 20.7 |
| Democratic | Bill Bolton | 2,421 | 20.3 |
| Republican | Kendall Hughes | 1,662 | 14.0 |
| Republican | Mike McLaughlin | 1,450 | 12.2 |
| Republican | George Kirk | 1,359 | 11.4 |
| Write-in | Write-ins | 14 | 0.1 |
| Total votes | | 11,899 | 100.0 |

=== Grafton 9 ===
- Elects one representative.

Republican primary

Grafton 9 Republican primary
| Party | Candidate | Votes | % |
|---|---|---|---|
| Republican | Donald McFarlane | 251 | 99.6 |
| Write-in | Write-ins | 1 | 0.4 |
| Total votes | | 252 | 100.0 |

Democratic primary

Grafton 9 Democratic primary
| Party | Candidate | Votes | % |
|---|---|---|---|
| Democratic | Corinne Morse | 295 | 99.7 |
| Write-in | Write-ins | 1 | 0.3 |
| Total votes | | 296 | 100.0 |

General election

Grafton 9 general election, 2022
| Party | Candidate | Votes | % |
|---|---|---|---|
| Democratic | Corinne Morse | 1,030 | 54.1 |
| Republican | Donald McFarlane | 875 | 45.9 |
| Total votes | | 1,905 | 100.0 |

=== Grafton 10 ===
- Elects one representative.

Republican primary

Grafton 10 Republican primary
| Party | Candidate | Votes | % |
|---|---|---|---|
| Republican | Carroll Brown Jr. | 351 | 61.6 |
| Republican | Randall Kelley | 216 | 37.9 |
| Write-in | Write-ins | 3 | 0.5 |
| Total votes | | 570 | 100.0 |

Democratic primary

Grafton 10 Democratic primary
| Party | Candidate | Votes | % |
|---|---|---|---|
| Democratic | Taylor Largmann | 225 | 99.6 |
| Write-in | Write-ins | 1 | 0.4 |
| Total votes | | 226 | 100.0 |

General election

Grafton 10 general election, 2022
| Party | Candidate | Votes | % |
|---|---|---|---|
| Republican | Carroll Brown Jr. | 1,255 | 59.23 |
| Democratic | Taylor Largmann | 863 | 40.73 |
| Write-in | Write-ins | 1 | 0.04 |
| Total votes | | 2,119 | 100.0 |

=== Grafton 11 ===
- Elects one representative.

Republican primary

Grafton 11 Republican primary
| Party | Candidate | Votes | % |
|---|---|---|---|
| Republican | Lex Berezhny (incumbent) | 491 | 100.0 |
| Total votes | | 491 | 100.0 |

Democratic primary

Grafton 11 Democratic primary
| Party | Candidate | Votes | % |
|---|---|---|---|
| Democratic | Catherine Mulholland | 245 | 99.2 |
| Write-in | Write-ins | 2 | 0.8 |
| Total votes | | 247 | 100.0 |

General election

Grafton 11 general election, 2022
| Party | Candidate | Votes | % |
|---|---|---|---|
| Republican | Lex Berezhny (incumbent) | 1,264 | 58.2 |
| Democratic | Catherine Mulholland | 905 | 41.7 |
| Write-in | Write-ins | 2 | 0.1 |
| Total votes | | 2,171 | 100.0 |

=== Grafton 12 ===
- Elects four representatives.

Democratic primary

Grafton 12 Democratic primary
| Party | Candidate | Votes | % |
|---|---|---|---|
| Democratic | Mary Hakken-Phillips (incumbent) | 1,772 | 21.9 |
| Democratic | Russell Muirhead (incumbent) | 1,642 | 20.3 |
| Democratic | Sharon Nordgren (incumbent) | 1,637 | 20.2 |
| Democratic | James M. Murphy (incumbent) | 1,466 | 18.1 |
| Democratic | Miles Brown | 1,119 | 13.8 |
| Democratic | Nicolas Macri | 458 | 5.7 |
| Write-in | Write-ins | 10 | 0.1 |
| Total votes | | 8,104 | 100.0 |

- No other candidates filed to run in the district, and in the Republican primary in this district, of all 43 votes, 34 of which were scattered write-in votes, and James M. Murphy got 3 votes. Mary Hakken-Phillips, Russell Muirhead, Sharon Nordgren got 2 votes each.

General election

Grafton 12 general election, 2022
| Party | Candidate | Votes | % |
|---|---|---|---|
| Democratic | Russell Muirhead (incumbent) | 5,386 | 25.04 |
| Democratic | James M. Murphy (incumbent) | 5,365 | 24.95 |
| Democratic | Mary Hakken-Phillips (incumbent) | 5,322 | 24.75 |
| Democratic | Sharon Nordgren (incumbent) | 5,312 | 24.70 |
| Write-in | Write-ins | 121 | 0.56 |
| Total votes | | 21,506 | 100.0 |

=== Grafton 13 ===
- Elects one representative.

Democratic primary

Grafton 13 Democratic primary
| Party | Candidate | Votes | % |
|---|---|---|---|
| Democratic | Laurel Stavis (incumbent) | 491 | 99.8 |
| Write-in | Write-ins | 1 | 0.2 |
| Total votes | | 492 | 100.0 |

- No other candidates filed to run in the district, and in the Republican primary in this district, 5 scattered write-in votes were cast.

General election

Grafton 13 general election, 2022
| Party | Candidate | Votes | % |
|---|---|---|---|
| Democratic | Laurel Stavis (incumbent) | 1,640 | 99.5 |
| Write-in | Write-ins | 8 | 0.5 |
| Total votes | | 1,648 | 100.0 |

=== Grafton 14 ===
- Elects one representative.

Democratic primary

Grafton 14 Democratic primary
| Party | Candidate | Votes | % |
|---|---|---|---|
| Democratic | George Sykes (incumbent) | 430 | 99.8 |
| Write-in | Write-ins | 1 | 0.2 |
| Total votes | | 431 | 100.0 |

- No other candidates filed to run in the district, and in the Republican primary in this district, 6 scattered write-in votes were cast.

General election

Grafton 14 general election, 2022
| Party | Candidate | Votes | % |
|---|---|---|---|
| Democratic | George Sykes (incumbent) | 1,641 | 99.3 |
| Write-in | Write-ins | 12 | 0.7 |
| Total votes | | 1,653 | 100.0 |

=== Grafton 15 ===
- Elects one representative.

Democratic primary

Grafton 15 Democratic primary
| Party | Candidate | Votes | % |
|---|---|---|---|
| Democratic | Thomas Cormen | 449 | 100.0 |
| Total votes | | 449 | 100.0 |

In the republican primary of this district, 13 votes were cast, one for Thomas Cormen, and the rest being scattered write-in votes. General election

Grafton 15 general election, 2022
| Party | Candidate | Votes | % |
|---|---|---|---|
| Democratic | Thomas Cormen | 1,416 | 74.5 |
| Independent | Nick Mouzourakis | 486 | 25.5 |
| Total votes | | 1,902 | 100.0 |

=== Grafton 16 ===
- Elects one representative.

Democratic primary

Grafton 16 Democratic primary
| Party | Candidate | Votes | % |
|---|---|---|---|
| Democratic | Joshua Adjutant (incumbent) | 410 | 99.8 |
| Write-in | Write-ins | 1 | 0.2 |
| Total votes | | 411 | 100.0 |

- No other candidates filed to run in the district, and in the Republican primary for this district, 4 scattered write-in votes were cast.

General election

Grafton 16 general election
| Party | Candidate | Votes | % |
|---|---|---|---|
| Democratic | Joshua Adjutant (incumbent) | 1,597 | 100.0 |
| Total votes | | 1,597 | 100.0 |

=== Grafton 17 ===
- Elects one representative.

Democratic primary

Grafton 17 Democratic primary
| Party | Candidate | Votes | % |
|---|---|---|---|
| Democratic | Susan Almy (incumbent) | 1,395 | 99.9 |
| Write-in | Write-ins | 2 | 0.1 |
| Total votes | | 1,397 | 100.0 |

- No other candidates filed to run in the district, and in the Republican primary for this district, 11 votes were cast, one for Susan Almy, and the rest were scattered write-in votes.

General election

Grafton 17 general election, 2022
| Party | Candidate | Votes | % |
|---|---|---|---|
| Democratic | Susan Almy (incumbent) | 4,985 | 99.3 |
| Write-in | Write-ins | 33 | 0.7 |
| Total votes | | 5,018 | 100.0 |

=== Grafton 18 ===
- Elects one representative.

Republican primary

Grafton 18 Republican primary
| Party | Candidate | Votes | % |
|---|---|---|---|
| Republican | John Sellers | 1,172 | 71.2 |
| Republican | Andrew Ware | 471 | 28.6 |
| Write-in | Write-ins | 3 | 0.2 |
| Total votes | | 1,646 | 100.0 |

Democratic primary

Grafton 18 Democratic primary
| Party | Candidate | Votes | % |
|---|---|---|---|
| Democratic | Carolyn Fluehr-Lobban | 1,147 | 99.3 |
| Write-in | Write-ins | 8 | 0.7 |
| Total votes | | 1,155 | 100.0 |

General election

Grafton 18 general election, 2022
| Party | Candidate | Votes | % |
|---|---|---|---|
| Republican | John Sellers | 4,229 | 50.02 |
| Democratic | Carolyn Fluehr-Lobban | 4,225 | 49.98 |
| Total votes | | 8,454 | 100.0 |

The results above are official after recount, and the original results are John Sellers getting 4223 votes, Carolyn Fluehr-Lobban getting 4188 votes, and the rest of the 3 votes being scattered write-in votes.

== Hillsborough County ==
=== Hillsborough 1 ===
- Elects four representatives.

Republican primary

Hillsborough 1 Republican primary
| Party | Candidate | Votes | % |
|---|---|---|---|
| Republican | Kimberly Abare | 1,576 | 29.69 |
| Republican | Tom Mannion | 932 | 17.56 |
| Republican | Jeffrey Tenczar | 836 | 15.75 |
| Republican | Sandra Panek | 792 | 14.92 |
| Republican | Donna Dube | 731 | 13.77 |
| Republican | Dave Cate | 412 | 7.76 |
| Democratic | David Hennessey (write-in) | 2 | 0.04 |
| Democratic | Harold Lynde (write-in) | 1 | 0.02 |
| Democratic | Sarah Champman (write-in) | 1 | 0.02 |
| Write-in | Misc. Write-ins | 25 | 0.47 |
| Total votes | | 5,308 | 100.0 |

Democratic primary

Hillsborough 1 Democratic primary
| Party | Candidate | Votes | % |
|---|---|---|---|
| Democratic | David Hennessey | 429 | 26.0 |
| Democratic | Sarah Champman | 408 | 24.7 |
| Democratic | Harold Lynde | 404 | 24.4 |
| Democratic | Paul Dadak | 393 | 23.8 |
| Republican | Dave Cate (write-in) | 10 | 0.6 |
| Republican | Kimberly Abare (write-in) | 3 | 0.2 |
| Republican | Tom Mannion (write-in) | 2 | 0.1 |
| Republican | Donna Dube (write-in) | 2 | 0.1 |
| Write-in | Misc. Write-ins | 2 | 0.1 |
| Total votes | | 1,653 | 100.0 |

General election

Hillsborough 1 General election, 2022
| Party | Candidate | Votes | % |
|---|---|---|---|
| Republican | Kimberly Abare | 4,240 | 17.74 |
| Republican | Tom Mannion | 3,610 | 15.11 |
| Republican | Sandra Panek | 3,540 | 14.81 |
| Republican | Jeffrey Tenczar | 3,533 | 14.79 |
| Democratic | David Hennessey | 2,339 | 9.79 |
| Democratic | Harold Lynde | 2,294 | 9.60 |
| Democratic | Sarah Champman | 2,171 | 9.09 |
| Democratic | Paul Dadak | 2,157 | 9.03 |
| Write-in | Write-ins | 11 | 0.05 |
| Total votes | | 23,895 | 100.0 |

=== Hillsborough 2 ===
- Elects seven representatives.

Republican primary

Hillsborough 2 Republican primary
| Party | Candidate | Votes | % |
|---|---|---|---|
| Republican | Laurie Sanborn (incumbent) | 2,137 | 15.51 |
| Republican | Linda Gould (incumbent) | 2,070 | 15.03 |
| Republican | Ted Gorski (incumbent) | 1,892 | 13.74 |
| Republican | Kristin Noble | 1,805 | 13.10 |
| Republican | Dan Hynes | 1,689 | 12.26 |
| Republican | John Schneller | 1,588 | 11.53 |
| Republican | Britton Albiston | 1,478 | 10.73 |
| Republican | Russan Marie Chester | 1,069 | 7.76 |
| Democratic | Loren Foxx (write-in) | 5 | 0.04 |
| Democratic | Catherine Rombeau (incumbent) (write-in) | 3 | 0.02 |
| Democratic | John Fitzgerald (write-in) | 2 | 0.01 |
| Democratic | Jeffrey Kerr (write-in) | 2 | 0.01 |
| Democratic | Kara LaMarche (write-in) | 1 | 0.01 |
| Democratic | Shana Potvin (write-in) | 1 | 0.01 |
| Democratic | Cheri Schmitt (write-in) | 1 | 0.01 |
| Write-in | Misc. Write-ins | 31 | 0.23 |
| Total votes | | 13,774 | 100.0 |

Democratic primary

Hillsborough 2 Democratic primary
| Party | Candidate | Votes | % |
|---|---|---|---|
| Democratic | Catherine Rombeau (incumbent) | 1,430 | 15.72 |
| Democratic | Kara LaMarche | 1,299 | 14.28 |
| Democratic | Shana Potvin | 1,287 | 14.15 |
| Democratic | John Fitzgerald | 1,284 | 14.12 |
| Democratic | Loren Foxx | 1,283 | 14.11 |
| Democratic | Cheri Schmitt | 1,260 | 13.86 |
| Democratic | Jeffrey Kerr | 1,244 | 13.68 |
| Republican | Laurie Sanborn (incumbent) (write-in) | 1 | 0.01 |
| Republican | Linda Gould (incumbent) (write-in) | 1 | 0.01 |
| Write-in | Misc. Write-ins | 5 | 0.05 |
| Total votes | | 9,094 | 100.0 |

General election

Hillsborough 2 general election, 2022
| Party | Candidate | Votes | % |
|---|---|---|---|
| Republican | Linda Gould (incumbent) | 5,607 | 7.67 |
| Republican | Laurie Sanborn (incumbent) | 5,602 | 7.66 |
| Republican | Ted Gorski (incumbent) | 5,466 | 7.48 |
| Democratic | Catherine Rombeau (incumbent) | 5,397 | 7.38 |
| Republican | Kristin Noble | 5,320 | 7.28 |
| Republican | Dan Hynes | 5,227 | 7.15 |
| Democratic | Loren Foxx | 5,223 | 7.14 |
| Republican | John Schneller | 5,176 | 7.08 |
| Democratic | Kara LaMarche | 5,168 | 7.07 |
| Republican | Britton Albiston | 5,107 | 6.99 |
| Democratic | John Fitzgerald | 5,107 | 6.99 |
| Democratic | Jeffrey Kerr | 4,946 | 6.77 |
| Democratic | Shana Potvin | 4,909 | 6.71 |
| Democratic | Cheri Schmitt | 4,818 | 6.59 |
| Write-in | Misc. Write-ins | 34 | 0.05 |
| Total votes | | 73,107 | 100.0 |

=== Hillsborough 3 ===
- Elects three representatives.

Democratic primary

Hillsborough 3 Democratic primary
| Party | Candidate | Votes | % |
|---|---|---|---|
| Democratic | David Cote (incumbent) | 133 | 34.9 |
| Democratic | Stacie-Marie Laughton (incumbent) | 124 | 32.5 |
| Democratic | Fred Davis | 114 | 29.9 |
| Republican | Joost Baumeister (write-in) | 1 | 0.3 |
| Write-in | Misc. Write-ins | 9 | 2.4 |
| Total votes | | 381 | 100.0 |

Republican primary

Hillsborough 3 Republican primary
| Party | Candidate | Votes | % |
|---|---|---|---|
| Republican | Joost Baumeister | 149 | 91.4 |
| Write-in | Write-ins | 14 | 8.6 |
| Total votes | | 163 | 100.0 |

General election

Hillsborough 3 general election, 2022
| Party | Candidate | Votes | % |
|---|---|---|---|
| Democratic | David Cote (incumbent) | 894 | 28.1 |
| Democratic | Stacie-Marie Laughton (incumbent) | 841 | 26.4 |
| Democratic | Fred Davis | 778 | 24.5 |
| Republican | Joost Baumeister | 668 | 21.0 |
| Total votes | | 3,181 | 100.0 |

=== Hillsborough 4 ===
- Elects three representatives.

Democratic primary

Hillsborough 4 Democratic primary
| Party | Candidate | Votes | % |
|---|---|---|---|
| Democratic | Sue Newman (incumbent) | 494 | 34.6 |
| Democratic | Linda Ryan | 471 | 33.0 |
| Democratic | Ray Newman (incumbent) | 458 | 32.1 |
| Write-in | Write-ins | 3 | 0.2 |
| Total votes | | 1,426 | 100.0 |

Republican primary

Hillsborough 4 Republican primary
| Party | Candidate | Votes | % |
|---|---|---|---|
| Republican | Michael McCarthy | 548 | 36.34 |
| Republican | Julie Smith | 486 | 32.23 |
| Republican | Corey MacLean | 449 | 29.77 |
| Democratic | Linda Ryan (write-in) | 1 | 0.07 |
| Write-in | Misc. Write-ins | 24 | 1.59 |
| Total votes | | 1,508 | 100.0 |

General election

Hillsborough 4 general election, 2022
| Party | Candidate | Votes | % |
|---|---|---|---|
| Democratic | Sue Newman (incumbent) | 2,284 | 19.80 |
| Democratic | Ray Newman (incumbent) | 2,198 | 19.05 |
| Democratic | Linda Ryan | 2,180 | 18.90 |
| Republican | Michael McCarthy | 1,694 | 14.68 |
| Republican | Julie Smith | 1,621 | 14.05 |
| Republican | Corey MacLean | 1,559 | 13.51 |
| Total votes | | 11,536 | 100.0 |

=== Hillsborough 5 ===
- Elects three representatives.

Democratic primary

Hillsborough 5 Democratic primary
| Party | Candidate | Votes | % |
|---|---|---|---|
| Democratic | Heather Raymond | 595 | 33.41 |
| Democratic | Susan Elberger | 589 | 33.07 |
| Democratic | Shelley Devine | 584 | 32.79 |
| Republican | Allison Dyer (write-in) | 2 | 0.11 |
| Republican | Tom Lanzara (write-in) | 2 | 0.11 |
| Republican | Michael Henry (write-in) | 2 | 0.11 |
| Republican | Elizabeth Ferreira (write-in) | 1 | 0.06 |
| Write-in | Misc. Write-ins | 6 | 0.34 |
| Total votes | | 1,781 | 100.0 |

Republican primary

Hillsborough 5 Republican primary
| Party | Candidate | Votes | % |
|---|---|---|---|
| Republican | Tom Lanzara | 697 | 32.6 |
| Republican | Elizabeth Ferreira | 611 | 28.6 |
| Republican | Allison Dyer | 531 | 24.9 |
| Republican | Michael Henry | 289 | 13.5 |
| Write-in | Write-ins | 7 | 0.3 |
| Total votes | | 2,135 | 100.0 |

General election

Hillsborough 5 general election, 2022
| Party | Candidate | Votes | % |
|---|---|---|---|
| Democratic | Susan Elberger | 2,424 | 18.4 |
| Democratic | Heather Raymond | 2,381 | 18.0 |
| Democratic | Shelley Devine | 2,369 | 18.0 |
| Republican | Tom Lanzara | 2,119 | 16.1 |
| Republican | Elizabeth Ferreira | 1,969 | 14.9 |
| Republican | Allison Dyer | 1,930 | 14.6 |
| Total votes | | 13,192 | 100.0 |

=== Hillsborough 6 ===
- Elects three representatives.

Democratic primary

Hillsborough 6 Democratic primary
| Party | Candidate | Votes | % |
|---|---|---|---|
| Democratic | Sherry Dutzy (incumbent) | 380 | 33.66 |
| Democratic | Suzanne Vail (incumbent) | 375 | 33.22 |
| Democratic | Carry Spier | 368 | 32.60 |
| Republican | Paul Berube (write-in) | 2 | 0.18 |
| Republican | Tara Canaway (write-in) | 1 | 0.09 |
| Republican | Joseph Chartier (write-in) | 1 | 0.09 |
| Republican | Doris Hohensee (write-in) | 1 | 0.09 |
| Republican | David Schoneman (write-in) | 1 | 0.09 |
| Total votes | | 1,129 | 100.0 |

Republican primary

Hillsborough 6 Republican primary
| Party | Candidate | Votes | % |
|---|---|---|---|
| Republican | Paul Berube | 356 | 26.93 |
| Republican | Tara Canaway | 337 | 25.49 |
| Republican | David Schoneman | 326 | 24.66 |
| Republican | Doris Hohensee | 182 | 13.77 |
| Republican | Joseph Chartier | 121 | 9.15 |
| Total votes | | 1,322 | 100.0 |

General election

Hillsborough 6 general election, 2022
| Party | Candidate | Votes | % |
|---|---|---|---|
| Democratic | Sherry Dutzy (incumbent) | 1,731 | 19.56 |
| Democratic | Suzanne Vail (incumbent) | 1,725 | 19.49 |
| Democratic | Carry Spier | 1,708 | 19.30 |
| Republican | Tara Canaway | 1,257 | 14.20 |
| Republican | Paul Berube | 1,240 | 14.01 |
| Republican | David Schoneman | 1,188 | 13.43 |
| Total votes | | 8,849 | 100.0 |

=== Hillsborough 7 ===
- Elects three representatives

Democratic primary

Hillsborough 7 Democratic primary
| Party | Candidate | Votes | % |
|---|---|---|---|
| Democratic | Alicia Gregg | 309 | 34.8 |
| Democratic | Catherine Sofikitis (incumbent) | 291 | 32.7 |
| Democratic | Louis Juris | 285 | 32.1 |
| Republican | Daniel Moriarty (write-in) | 1 | 0.1 |
| Write-in | Misc. Write-ins | 3 | 0.3 |
| Total votes | | 889 | 100.0 |

Republican primary

Hillsborough 7 Republican primary
| Party | Candidate | Votes | % |
|---|---|---|---|
| Republican | Edith Hogan | 311 | 33.3 |
| Republican | Daniel Moriarty | 306 | 32.7 |
| Republican | Avalon Lewis | 303 | 32.4 |
| Write-in | Write-ins | 15 | 1.6 |
| Total votes | | 935 | 100.0 |

General election

Hillsborough 7 general election, 2022
| Party | Candidate | Votes | % |
|---|---|---|---|
| Democratic | Alicia Gregg | 1,496 | 19.8 |
| Democratic | Catherine Sofikitis (incumbent) | 1,368 | 18.1 |
| Democratic | Louis Juris | 1,351 | 17.9 |
| Republican | Avalon Lewis | 1,119 | 14.8 |
| Republican | Edith Hogan | 1,107 | 14.7 |
| Republican | Daniel Moriarty | 1,098 | 14.6 |
| Total votes | | 7,539 | 100.0 |

=== Hillsborough 8 ===
- Elects three representatives

Democratic primary

Hillsborough 8 Democratic primary
| Party | Candidate | Votes | % |
|---|---|---|---|
| Democratic | Efstathia Booras (incumbent) | 278 | 33.33 |
| Democratic | Christal Lloyd | 275 | 32.97 |
| Democratic | Fran Nutter-Upham (incumbent) | 275 | 32.97 |
| Republican | Edward Decatur (write-in) | 1 | 0.12 |
| Republican | Kevin Scully (write-in) | 1 | 0.12 |
| Republican | Chris Thibodeau (write-in) | 1 | 0.12 |
| Write-in | Misc. Write-ins | 3 | 0.36 |
| Total votes | | 834 | 100.0 |

Republican primary

Hillsborough 8 Republican primary
| Party | Candidate | Votes | % |
|---|---|---|---|
| Republican | Kevin Scully | 287 | 40.94 |
| Republican | Chris Thibodeau | 217 | 30.96 |
| Republican | Edward Decatur | 193 | 27.53 |
| Write-in | Write-ins | 4 | 0.57 |
| Total votes | | | 100.0 |

General election

Hillsborough 8 general election, 2022
| Party | Candidate | Votes | % |
|---|---|---|---|
| Democratic | Christal Lloyd | 1,411 | 18.85 |
| Democratic | Efstathia Booras (incumbent) | 1,409 | 18.83 |
| Democratic | Fran Nutter-Upham (incumbent) | 1,348 | 18.01 |
| Republican | Kevin Scully | 1,204 | 16.09 |
| Republican | Chris Thibodeau | 1,103 | 14.74 |
| Republican | Edward Decatur | 1,009 | 13.48 |
| Total votes | | 7,484 | 100.0 |

=== Hillsborough 9 ===
- Elects three representatives

Democratic primary

Hillsborough 9 Democratic primary
| Party | Candidate | Votes | % |
|---|---|---|---|
| Democratic | Allison Nutting-Wong (incumbent) | 490 | 36.57 |
| Democratic | Michael Pedersen (incumbent) | 423 | 31.57 |
| Democratic | William Dolan | 415 | 30.97 |
| Republican | Paula Johnson (write-in) | 2 | 0.15 |
| Republican | Di Lothrop (write-in) | 2 | 0.15 |
| Republican | Claudette Schmidt (write-in) | 2 | 0.15 |
| Write-in | Misc. Write-ins | 6 | 0.45 |
| Total votes | | 1,340 | 100.0 |

Republican primary

Hillsborough 9 Republican primary
| Party | Candidate | Votes | % |
|---|---|---|---|
| Republican | Paula Johnson | 620 | 37.44 |
| Republican | Claudette Schmidt | 509 | 30.74 |
| Republican | Di Lothrop | 505 | 30.50 |
| Democratic | Allison Nutting-Wong (incumbent) (write-in) | 2 | 0.12 |
| Democratic | Michael Pedersen (incumbent) (write-in) | 2 | 0.12 |
| Democratic | William Dolan (write-in) | 1 | 0.06 |
| Write-in | Misc. Write-ins | 17 | 1.03 |
| Total votes | | 1,656 | 100.0 |

General election

Hillsborough 9 general election, 2022
| Party | Candidate | Votes | % |
|---|---|---|---|
| Democratic | Allison Nutting-Wong (incumbent) | 2,436 | 18.63 |
| Democratic | William Dolan | 2,314 | 17.70 |
| Democratic | Michael Pedersen (incumbent) | 2,291 | 17.52 |
| Republican | Paula Johnson | 2,151 | 16.45 |
| Republican | Claudette Schmidt | 1,980 | 15.14 |
| Republican | Di Lothrop | 1,902 | 14.55 |
| Total votes | | 13,074 | 100.0 |

=== Hillsborough 10 ===
- Elects three representatives

Democratic primary

Hillsborough 10 Democratic primary
| Party | Candidate | Votes | % |
|---|---|---|---|
| Democratic | Linda Harriott-Gathright (incumbent) | 433 | 35.20 |
| Democratic | Michael O'Brien (incumbent) | 404 | 32.85 |
| Democratic | Marty Jack (incumbent) | 389 | 31.63 |
| Write-in | Write-ins | 4 | 0.33 |
| Total votes | | 1,230 | 100.0 |

Republican primary

Hillsborough 10 Republican primary
| Party | Candidate | Votes | % |
|---|---|---|---|
| Republican | Bill Ohm | 492 | 39.49 |
| Republican | John Cawthron | 373 | 29.94 |
| Republican | Paul Thoman | 362 | 29.05 |
| Democratic | Linda Harriott-Gathright (incumbent) | 2 | 0.16 |
| Democratic | Marty Jack (incumbent) | 1 | 0.08 |
| Write-in | Misc. Write-ins | 16 | 0.33 |
| Total votes | | 1,246 | 1.28 |

General election

Hillsborough 10 general election, 2022
| Party | Candidate | Votes | % |
|---|---|---|---|
| Democratic | Michael O'Brien (incumbent) | 2,155 | 19.11 |
| Democratic | Linda Harriott-Gathright (incumbent) | 2,118 | 18.78 |
| Democratic | Marty Jack (incumbent) | 2,039 | 18.08 |
| Republican | Bill Ohm | 1,828 | 16.21 |
| Republican | John Cawthron | 1,594 | 14.14 |
| Republican | Paul Thoman | 1,541 | 13.67 |
| Total votes | | 11,275 | 100.0 |

=== Hillsborough 11 ===
- Elects three representatives

Democratic primary

Hillsborough 11 Democratic primary
| Party | Candidate | Votes | % |
|---|---|---|---|
| Democratic | Latha Mangipudi (incumbent) | 425 | 34.47 |
| Democratic | Laura Telerski (incumbent) | 421 | 34.14 |
| Democratic | William Darby | 384 | 31.14 |
| Write-in | Write-ins | 3 | 0.24 |
| Total votes | | 1,233 | 100.0 |

Republican primary

Hillsborough 11 Republican primary
| Party | Candidate | Votes | % |
|---|---|---|---|
| Republican | Peter Silva | 383 | 37.4 |
| Republican | Kristie Hart | 330 | 32.2 |
| Republican | Brett Powell | 293 | 28.6 |
| Democratic | Latha Mangipudi (incumbent) (write-in) | 1 | 0.1 |
| Write-in | Misc. Write-ins | 17 | 1.7 |
| Total votes | | 1,024 | 100.0 |

General election

Hillsborough 11 general election, 2022
| Party | Candidate | Votes | % |
|---|---|---|---|
| Democratic | Latha Mangipudi (incumbent) | 2,011 | 20.59 |
| Democratic | Laura Telerski (incumbent) | 2,009 | 20.57 |
| Democratic | William Darby | 1,926 | 19.72 |
| Republican | Kristie Hart | 1,334 | 13.66 |
| Republican | Peter Silva | 1,319 | 13.51 |
| Republican | Brett Powell | 1,166 | 11.94 |
| Total votes | | 9,765 | 100.0 |

=== Hillsborough 12 ===
- Elects eight representatives

Democratic primary

Hillsborough 12 Democratic primary
| Party | Candidate | Votes | % |
|---|---|---|---|
| Democratic | Rosemarie Rung (incumbent) | 1,148 | 13.40 |
| Democratic | Nancy Murphy (incumbent) | 1,127 | 13.16 |
| Democratic | Wendy Thomas (incumbent) | 1,106 | 12.91 |
| Democratic | Kathryn Stack (incumbent) | 1,067 | 12.45 |
| Democratic | Sara Locke | 1,035 | 12.08 |
| Democratic | Kimberly Plante | 1,035 | 12.08 |
| Democratic | Anne Manning | 1,026 | 11.98 |
| Democratic | Donna LaRue | 1,023 | 11.94 |
| Total votes | | 8,567 | 100.00 |

Republican Primary

Hillsborough 12 Republican primary
| Party | Candidate | Votes | % |
|---|---|---|---|
| Republican | Jeanine Notter (incumbent) | 1,954 | 12.51 |
| Republican | Maureen Mooney (incumbent) | 1,887 | 12.08 |
| Republican | Tim McGough | 1,874 | 12.00 |
| Republican | Bill Boyd (incumbent) | 1,866 | 11.95 |
| Republican | Bob Healey (incumbent) | 1,746 | 11.18 |
| Republican | Melissa Blasek | 1,713 | 10.97 |
| Republican | Barbara Healey | 1,640 | 10.50 |
| Republican | Mary Mayville (incumbent) | 1,560 | 9.99 |
| Republican | R. Brian Snow | 1,379 | 8.83 |
| Total votes | | 15,619 | 100.00 |

General election

Hillsborough 12 general election, 2022
| Party | Candidate | Votes | % |
|---|---|---|---|
| Democratic | Rosemarie Rung (incumbent) | 6,245 | 6.85 |
| Democratic | Nancy Murphy (incumbent) | 6,131 | 6.73 |
| Republican | Maureen Mooney (incumbent) | 6,037 | 6.62 |
| Republican | Jeanine Notter (incumbent) | 5,860 | 6.43 |
| Democratic | Wendy Thomas (incumbent) | 5,843 | 6.41 |
| Republican | Bill Boyd (incumbent) | 5,839 | 6.41 |
| Republican | Tim McGough | 5,828 | 6.39 |
| Republican | Bob Healey (incumbent) | 5,710 | 6.27 |
| Republican | Melissa Blasek (incumbent) | 5,635 | 6.18 |
| Republican | Barbara Healey | 5,625 | 6.17 |
| Democratic | Kathryn Stack (incumbent) | 5,545 | 6.08 |
| Democratic | Sara Locke | 5,522 | 6.06 |
| Republican | Mary Mayville (incumbent) | 5,456 | 5.99 |
| Democratic | Donna LaRue | 5,341 | 5.86 |
| Democratic | Anne Manning | 5,262 | 5.77 |
| Democratic | Kimberly Plante | 5,258 | 5.77 |
| Total votes | | 91,137 | 100.0 |

=== Hillsborough 13 ===
- Elects six representatives

Democratic primary

Hillsborough 13 Democratic primary
| Party | Candidate | Votes | % |
|---|---|---|---|
| Democratic | Barbara Blue | 839 | 25.67 |
| Democratic | John Knowles | 831 | 25.43 |
| Democratic | Steven Katsos | 804 | 24.60 |
| Democratic | J. Alejandro Urrutia | 782 | 23.93 |
| Write-in | Misc. Write-ins | 4 | 0.12 |
| Republican | Andrew Prout (incumbent) (write-in) | 2 | 0.06 |
| Republican | Jordan Ulery (incumbent) (write-in) | 2 | 0.06 |
| Republican | Stephen Kennedy (write-in) | 1 | 0.03 |
| Republican | Cathy Kenny (write-in) | 1 | 0.03 |
| Republican | Andrew Renzullo (incumbent) (write-in) | 1 | 0.03 |
| Republican | Robert Wherry (write-in) | 1 | 0.03 |
| Total votes | | 3,268 | 100.0 |

Republican primary

Hillsborough 13 Republican primary
| Party | Candidate | Votes | % |
|---|---|---|---|
| Republican | Jordan Ulery (incumbent) | 1,604 | 17.39 |
| Republican | Andrew Renzullo (incumbent) | 1,582 | 17.15 |
| Republican | Stephen Kennedy | 1,549 | 16.79 |
| Republican | Andrew Prout (incumbent) | 1,537 | 16.66 |
| Republican | Cathy Kenny | 1,509 | 16.36 |
| Republican | Robert Wherry | 1,407 | 15.25 |
| Write-in | Misc. Write-ins | 35 | 0.38 |
| Democratic | J. Alejandro Urrutia (write-in) | 1 | 0.01 |
| Total votes | | 9,224 | 100.0 |

General election

Hillsborough 13 general election, 2022
| Party | Candidate | Votes | % |
|---|---|---|---|
| Republican | Stephen Kennedy | 5,474 | 11.49 |
| Republican | Cathy Kenny | 5,454 | 11.45 |
| Republican | Jordan Ulery (incumbent) | 5,293 | 11.11 |
| Republican | Andrew Renzullo (incumbent) | 5,170 | 10.86 |
| Republican | Andrew Prout (incumbent) | 5,161 | 10.84 |
| Republican | Robert Wherry | 4,882 | 10.25 |
| Democratic | John Knowles | 4,135 | 8.68 |
| Democratic | Steven Katsos | 4,068 | 8.54 |
| Democratic | Barbara Blue | 4,052 | 8.51 |
| Democratic | J. Alejandro Urrutia | 3,894 | 8.18 |
| Write-in | Misc. Write-ins | 44 | 0.09 |
| Total votes | | 47,627 | 100.0 |

=== Hillsborough 14 ===
- Elects two representatives

Republican primary

Hillsborough 14 Republican primary
| Party | Candidate | Votes | % |
|---|---|---|---|
| Republican | Rich Lascelles (incumbent) | 712 | 48.2 |
| Republican | Ralph Boehm (incumbent) | 630 | 42.6 |
| Republican | Ray Peeples (write-in) | 134 | 9.1 |
| Write-in | Misc. Write-ins | 2 | 0.1 |
| Total votes | | 1,478 | 100.0 |

Democratic primary

Hillsborough 14 Democratic primary
| Party | Candidate | Votes | % |
|---|---|---|---|
| Democratic | Joe Stanieich-Burke | 313 | 54.3 |
| Democratic | Mahendra Bakshi | 254 | 44.1 |
| Write-in | Write-ins | 9 | 1.6 |
| Total votes | | 576 | 100.0 |

General election

Hillsborough 14 general election, 2022
| Party | Candidate | Votes | % |
|---|---|---|---|
| Republican | Rich Lascelles (incumbent) | 2,358 | 31.4 |
| Republican | Ralph Boehm (incumbent) | 2,090 | 27.8 |
| Democratic | Joe Stanieich-Burke | 1,702 | 22.6 |
| Democratic | Mahendra Bakshi | 1,370 | 18.2 |
| Total votes | | 7,520 | 100.0 |

=== Hillsborough 15 ===
- Elects two representatives

Republican primary

Hillsborough 15 Republican primary
| Party | Candidate | Votes | % |
|---|---|---|---|
| Republican | Mark McLean (incumbent) | 697 | 53.2 |
| Republican | Mark Proulx | 606 | 46.2 |
| Write-in | Misc. Write-ins | 7 | 0.5 |
| Democratic | Brandon Lemay (write-in) | 1 | 0.1 |
| Total votes | | 1,311 | 100.0 |

Democratic primary

Hillsborough 15 Democratic primary
| Party | Candidate | Votes | % |
|---|---|---|---|
| Democratic | Lara Quiroga | 360 | 51.72 |
| Democratic | Brandon Lemay | 334 | 47.99 |
| Republican | Mark McLean (incumbent) (write-in) | 1 | 0.14 |
| Republican | Mark Proulx (write-in) | 1 | 0.14 |
| Total votes | | 696 | 100.0 |

General election

Hillsborough 15 general election, 2022
| Party | Candidate | Votes | % |
|---|---|---|---|
| Republican | Mark Proulx | 2,011 | 27.68 |
| Republican | Mark McLean (incumbent) | 1,946 | 26.79 |
| Democratic | Brandon Lemay | 1,678 | 23.10 |
| Democratic | Lara Quiroga | 1,627 | 22.40 |
| Write-in | Write-ins | 3 | 0.04 |
| Total votes | | 7,265 | 100.0 |

=== Hillsborough 16 ===
- Elects two representatives

Republican primary

Hillsborough 16 Republican primary
| Party | Candidate | Votes | % |
|---|---|---|---|
| Republican | William Infantine (incumbent) | 675 | 51.4 |
| Republican | Larry Gagne (incumbent) | 629 | 47.9 |
| Write-in | Write-ins | 9 | 0.7 |
| Total votes | | 1,313 | 100.0 |

Democratic primary

Hillsborough 16 Democratic primary
| Party | Candidate | Votes | % |
|---|---|---|---|
| Democratic | Maxine Mosley | 383 | 54.8 |
| Democratic | Holly Hillhouse | 305 | 43.6 |
| Republican | William Infantine (incumbent) (write-in) | 4 | 0.6 |
| Write-in | Misc.Write-ins | 4 | 0.6 |
| Republican | Larry Gagne (incumbent) (write-in) | 3 | 0.4 |
| Total votes | | 699 | 100.0 |

General election

Hillsborough 16 general election, 2022 (preliminary count)
| Party | Candidate | Votes | % |
|---|---|---|---|
| Republican | William Infantine (incumbent) | 1,895 | 26.47 |
| Republican | Larry Gagne (incumbent) | 1,820 | 25.42 |
| Democratic | Maxine Mosley | 1,797 | 25.10 |
| Democratic | Holly Hillhouse | 1,644 | 22.96 |
| Write-in | Write-ins | 4 | 0.06 |
| Total votes | | 7,160 | 100.0 |

Hillsborough 16 general election, 2022 (first recount)
| Party | Candidate | Votes | % |
|---|---|---|---|
| Republican | William Infantine (incumbent) | 1,877 | 26.37 |
| Democratic | Maxine Mosley | 1,799 | 25.28 |
| Republican | Larry Gagne (incumbent) | 1,798 | 25.26 |
| Democratic | Holly Hillhouse | 1,643 | 23.09 |
| Total votes | | 7,117 | 100.0 |

Hillsborough 16 general election, 2022 (court ordered final recount)
| Party | Candidate | Votes | % |
|---|---|---|---|
| Republican | William Infantine (incumbent) | 1,903 | 26.55 |
| Republican | Larry Gagne (incumbent) | 1,824 | 25.45 |
| Democratic | Maxine Mosley | 1,798 | 25.08 |
| Democratic | Holly Hillhouse | 1,643 | 22.92 |
| Total votes | | 7,168 | 100.0 |

=== Hillsborough 17 ===
- Elects two representatives

Democratic primary

Hillsborough 17 Democratic primary
| Party | Candidate | Votes | % |
|---|---|---|---|
| Democratic | Linda DiSilvestro (incumbent) | 521 | 50.1 |
| Democratic | David Preece | 515 | 49.6 |
| Write-in | Misc. Write-ins | 2 | 0.2 |
| Republican | Tyler Chase (write-in) | 1 | 0.1 |
| Total votes | | 1,039 | 100.0 |

Republican primary

Hillsborough 17 Republican primary
| Party | Candidate | Votes | % |
|---|---|---|---|
| Republican | Tyler Chase | 503 | 57.5 |
| Republican | Lee Davis | 359 | 41.0 |
| Write-in | Misc. Write-ins | 11 | 1.3 |
| Democratic | Linda DiSilvestro (incumbent) (write-in) | 1 | 0.1 |
| Democratic | David Preece (write-in) | 1 | 0.1 |
| Total votes | | 875 | 100.0 |

General election

Hillsborough 17 general election, 2022
| Party | Candidate | Votes | % |
|---|---|---|---|
| Democratic | Linda DiSilvestro (incumbent) | 2,053 | 29.51 |
| Democratic | David Preece | 1,940 | 27.88 |
| Republican | Tyler Chase | 1,397 | 20.08 |
| Republican | Lee Davis | 1,243 | 17.86 |
| Libertarian | Valerie Sarwark | 323 | 4.64 |
| Write-in | Write-ins | 2 | 0.02 |
| Total votes | | 6,958 | 100.0 |

=== Hillsborough 18 ===
- Elects two representatives

Democratic primary

Hillsborough 18 Democratic primary
| Party | Candidate | Votes | % |
|---|---|---|---|
| Democratic | Jessica Grill | 427 | 53.8 |
| Democratic | Juliet Smith | 364 | 45.8 |
| Write-in | Write-ins | 3 | 0.4 |
| Total votes | | 794 | 100.0 |

Republican primary

Hillsborough 18 Republican primary
| Party | Candidate | Votes | % |
|---|---|---|---|
| Republican | Matt Whitlock | 334 | 51.31 |
| Republican | Dick Marston (incumbent) | 308 | 47.31 |
| Write-in | Misc. Write-ins | 8 | 1.23 |
| Democratic | Jessica Grill (write-in) | 1 | 0.15 |
| Total votes | | 651 | 100.0 |

General election

Hillsborough 18 general election, 2022
| Party | Candidate | Votes | % |
|---|---|---|---|
| Democratic | Jessica Grill | 1,719 | 27.98 |
| Democratic | Juliet Smith | 1,665 | 27.10 |
| Republican | Dick Marston (incumbent) | 1,458 | 23.73 |
| Republican | Matt Whitlock | 1,295 | 21.08 |
| Write-in | Write-ins | 6 | 0.10 |
| Total votes | | 6,143 | 100.0 |

=== Hillsborough 19 ===
- Elects two representatives

Democratic primary

Hillsborough 19 Democratic primary
| Party | Candidate | Votes | % |
|---|---|---|---|
| Democratic | Heidi Hamer (incumbent) | 373 | 51.1 |
| Democratic | Jane Beaulieu (incumbent) | 353 | 48.4 |
| Write-in | Misc. Write-ins | 3 | 0.4 |
| Republican | Tammy Simmons Garthwaite (write-in) | 1 | 0.1 |
| Total votes | | 730 | 100.0 |

Republican primary

Hillsborough 19 Republican primary
| Party | Candidate | Votes | % |
|---|---|---|---|
| Republican | Tammy Simmons Garthwaite | 455 | 51.7 |
| Republican | Daniel Garthwaite | 420 | 47.7 |
| Write-in | Misc. Write-ins | 4 | 0.5 |
| Democratic | Heidi Hamer (incumbent) (write-in) | 1 | 0.1 |
| Total votes | | 880 | 100.0 |

General election

Hillsborough 19 general election, 2022
| Party | Candidate | Votes | % |
|---|---|---|---|
| Democratic | Heidi Hamer (incumbent) | 1,471 | 27.0 |
| Democratic | Jane Beaulieu (incumbent) | 1,425 | 26.2 |
| Republican | Tammy Simmons Garthwaite | 1,300 | 23.9 |
| Republican | Daniel Garthwaite | 1,242 | 22.8 |
| Write-in | Write-ins | 10 | 0.2 |
| Total votes | | 5,448 | 100.0 |

=== Hillsborough 20 ===
- Elects two representatives

Republican primary

Hillsborough 20 Republican primary
| Party | Candidate | Votes | % |
|---|---|---|---|
| Republican | Pierre Dupont | 363 | 52.4 |
| Republican | Robert Kliskey | 328 | 47.3 |
| Write-in | Write-ins | 2 | 0.3 |
| Total votes | | 693 | 100.0 |

Democratic primary

Hillsborough 20 Democratic primary (preliminary count)
| Party | Candidate | Votes | % |
|---|---|---|---|
| Democratic | Alissandra Murray | 232 | 35.80 |
| Democratic | Candace Gibbons | 210 | 32.41 |
| Democratic | Joshua Query (incumbent) | 206 | 31.79 |
| Total votes | | 648 | 100.0 |

Hillsborough 20 Democratic primary (recount)
| Party | Candidate | Votes | % |
|---|---|---|---|
| Democratic | Alissandra Murray | 233 | 35.85 |
| Democratic | Candace Gibbons | 211 | 32.46 |
| Democratic | Joshua Query (incumbent) | 206 | 31.69 |
| Total votes | | 650 | 100.0 |

General election

Hillsborough 20 general election, 2022
| Party | Candidate | Votes | % |
|---|---|---|---|
| Democratic | Alissandra Murray | 1,398 | 27.49 |
| Democratic | Candace Gibbons | 1,376 | 27.05 |
| Republican | Pierre Dupont | 1,160 | 22.81 |
| Republican | Robert Kliskey | 1,150 | 22.61 |
| Write-in | Write-ins | 2 | 0.04 |
| Total votes | | 5,086 | 100.0 |

=== Hillsborough 21 ===
- Elects two representatives

Republican primary

Hillsborough 21 Republican primary
| Party | Candidate | Votes | % |
|---|---|---|---|
| Republican | Andrew Fromuth | 581 | 49.79 |
| Republican | August Fromuth | 578 | 49.53 |
| Write-in | Misc. Write-ins | 4 | 0.34 |
| Democratic | Jeffrey Goley (incumbent) (write-in) | 3 | 0.26 |
| Democratic | Christine Seibert (write-in) | 1 | 0.09 |
| Total votes | | 1,167 | 100.0 |

Democratic primary

Hillsborough 21 Democratic primary (preliminary count)
| Party | Candidate | Votes | % |
|---|---|---|---|
| Democratic | Jeffrey Goley (incumbent) | 637 | 38.37 |
| Democratic | Christine Seibert | 515 | 31.02 |
| Democratic | Diane Langley (incumbent) | 508 | 30.60 |
| Total votes | | 1,660 | 100.0 |

Hillsborough 21 Democratic primary (recount)
| Party | Candidate | Votes | % |
|---|---|---|---|
| Democratic | Jeffrey Goley (incumbent) | 639 | 38.45 |
| Democratic | Christine Seibert | 515 | 30.99 |
| Democratic | Diane Langley (incumbent) | 508 | 30.57 |
| Total votes | | 1,662 | 100.0 |

General election

Hillsborough 21 general election, 2022
| Party | Candidate | Votes | % |
|---|---|---|---|
| Democratic | Jeffrey Goley (incumbent) | 2,527 | 30.52 |
| Democratic | Christine Seibert | 2,459 | 29.70 |
| Republican | August Fromuth | 1,676 | 20.24 |
| Republican | Andrew Fromuth | 1,612 | 19.47 |
| Write-in | Write-ins | 5 | 0.06 |
| Total votes | | 8,279 | 100.0 |

=== Hillsborough 22 ===
- Elects two representatives

Republican primary

Hillsborough 22 Republican primary
| Party | Candidate | Votes | % |
|---|---|---|---|
| Republican | Carla Gericke | 284 | 53.2 |
| Republican | Brittany LeClear-Ping | 237 | 44.4 |
| Write-in | Misc. Write-ins | 12 | 2.2 |
| Democratic | Sara Lachance (write-in) | 1 | 0.2 |
| Total votes | | 534 | 100.0 |

Democratic primary

Hillsborough 22 Democratic primary
| Party | Candidate | Votes | % |
|---|---|---|---|
| Democratic | Patricia Cornell (incumbent) | 262 | 45.2 |
| Democratic | Nicole Leapley | 206 | 35.5 |
| Democratic | Sara Lachance | 111 | 19.1 |
| Write-in | Write-ins | 1 | 0.2 |
| Total votes | | 580 | 100.0 |

General election

Hillsborough 22 general election, 2022
| Party | Candidate | Votes | % |
|---|---|---|---|
| Democratic | Patricia Cornell (incumbent) | 1,225 | 28.59 |
| Democratic | Nicole Leapley | 1,196 | 27.92 |
| Republican | Carla Gericke | 966 | 22.55 |
| Republican | Brittany LeClear-Ping | 897 | 20.94 |
| Total votes | | 4,284 | 100.0 |

=== Hillsborough 23 ===
- Elects two representatives

Democratic primary

Hillsborough 23 Democratic primary, 2022
| Party | Candidate | Votes | % |
|---|---|---|---|
| Democratic | Patrick Long (incumbent) | 339 | 53.3 |
| Democratic | Jean Jeudy (incumbent) | 296 | 46.5 |
| Write-in | Write-ins | 1 | 0.2 |
| Total votes | | 636 | 100.0 |

No Republicans filed their candidacies in this district. In the Republican primary of this district, 32 votes were cast, 3 for Patrick Long, and the rest of them being scattered write-in votes. General election

Hillsborough 23 general election, 2022
| Party | Candidate | Votes | % |
|---|---|---|---|
| Democratic | Patrick Long (incumbent) | 1,490 | 52.0 |
| Democratic | Jean Jeudy (incumbent) | 1,356 | 47.3 |
| Write-in | Write-ins | 19 | 0.7 |
| Total votes | | 2,865 | 100.0 |

=== Hillsborough 24 ===
- Elects two representatives

Democratic primary

Hillsborough 24 Democratic primary
| Party | Candidate | Votes | % |
|---|---|---|---|
| Democratic | Chris Herbert (incumbent) | 324 | 49.62 |
| Democratic | Donald Bouchard (incumbent) | 323 | 49.46 |
| Republican | Jean Mathieu (write-in) | 3 | 0.46 |
| Write-in | Misc. Write-ins | 3 | 0.46 |
| Total votes | | 653 | 100.0 |

Republican primary

Hillsborough 24 Republican primary
| Party | Candidate | Votes | % |
|---|---|---|---|
| Republican | Jean Mathieu | 313 | 56.09 |
| Republican | Richard Hagala | 237 | 42.47 |
| Write-in | Misc. Write-ins | 7 | 1.25 |
| Democratic | Donald Bouchard (incumbent) (write-in) | 1 | 0.18 |
| Total votes | | 558 | 100.0 |

General election

Hillsborough 24 general election, 2022
| Party | Candidate | Votes | % |
|---|---|---|---|
| Democratic | Chris Herbert (incumbent) | 1,290 | 29.82 |
| Democratic | Donald Bouchard (incumbent) | 1,229 | 28.41 |
| Republican | Jean Mathieu | 982 | 22.70 |
| Republican | Richard Hagala | 824 | 19.05 |
| Write-in | Write-ins | 1 | 0.02 |
| Total votes | | 4,326 | 100.0 |

=== Hillsborough 25 ===
- Elects two representatives

Democratic primary

Hillsborough 25 Democratic primary
| Party | Candidate | Votes | % |
|---|---|---|---|
| Democratic | Amanda Bouldin (incumbent) | 172 | 48.04 |
| Democratic | Andrew Bouldin (incumbent) (withdrew) | 149 | 41.62 |
| Write-in | Write-ins | 37 | 10.34 |
| Total votes | | 358 | 100 |

Republican primary

Hillsborough 25 Republican primary
| Party | Candidate | Votes | % |
|---|---|---|---|
| Republican | Scott Mattiello | 212 | 90.6 |
| Write-in | Write-ins | 22 | 9.4 |
| Total votes | | 234 | 100 |

General election

Hillsborough 25 general election, 2022
| Party | Candidate | Votes | % |
|---|---|---|---|
| Democratic | Amanda Bouldin (incumbent) | 899 | 29.87 |
| Democratic | Kathy Staub | 853 | 28.34 |
| Republican | Kathleen Paquette | 676 | 22.46 |
| Republican | Scott Mattiello | 581 | 19.30 |
| Write-in | Write-ins | 1 | 0.03 |
| Total votes | | 3,010 | 100.0 |

=== Hillsborough 26 ===
- Elects two representatives

Republican primary

Hillsborough 26 Republican primary
| Party | Candidate | Votes | % |
|---|---|---|---|
| Republican | Brian Cole | 389 | 96.5 |
| Write-in | Write-ins | 14 | 3.5 |
| Total votes | | 403 | 100.0 |

Democratic primary

Hillsborough 26 Democratic primary
| Party | Candidate | Votes | % |
|---|---|---|---|
| Democratic | Mary Freitas (incumbent) | 340 | 57.05 |
| Democratic | Tiffany Forsing | 253 | 42.45 |
| Write-in | Misc. Write-ins | 2 | 0.34 |
| Republican | Brian Cole (write-in) | 1 | 0.17 |
| Total votes | | 596 | 100.0 |

General election

Hillsborough 26 general election, 2022
| Party | Candidate | Votes | % |
|---|---|---|---|
| Democratic | Mary Freitas (incumbent) | 1,408 | 38.50 |
| Republican | Brian Cole | 1,159 | 31.69 |
| Democratic | Tiffany Forsing | 1,085 | 29.67 |
| Write-in | Write-ins | 5 | 0.14 |
| Total votes | | 3,657 | 100.0 |

=== Hillsborough 27 ===
- Elects one representative

Democratic primary

Hillsborough 27 Democratic primary
| Party | Candidate | Votes | % |
|---|---|---|---|
| Democratic | Susan Kane | 261 | 99.24 |
| Republican | Karen Reid (write-in) | 1 | 0.38 |
| Write-in | Misc. Write-ins | 1 | 0.38 |
| Total votes | | 263 | 100.0 |

Republican primary

Hillsborough 27 Republican primary
| Party | Candidate | Votes | % |
|---|---|---|---|
| Republican | Karen Reid | 456 | 98.7 |
| Write-in | Misc. Write-ins | 5 | 1.1 |
| Democratic | Susan Kane (write-in) | 1 | 0.2 |
| Total votes | | 462 | 100.0 |

General election

Hillsborough 27 general election, 2022
| Party | Candidate | Votes | % |
|---|---|---|---|
| Republican | Karen Reid | 1,032 | 55.5 |
| Democratic | Susan Kane | 827 | 44.4 |
| Write-in | Write-ins | 2 | 0.1 |
| Total votes | | 1,861 | 100.0 |

=== Hillsborough 28 ===
- Elects two representatives
