= Karen Read =

Karen Read may refer to:

- Karen A. Read, American woman found not guilty of charges related to the death of John O'Keefe
- Karen Read (cricketer), Australian former cricketer
- Karen Reid, former American politician and New Hampshire House of Representatives member
