= Robert Wherry =

Robert Wherry may refer to:

- Robert Wherry (judge) (born 1944), judge of the United States Tax Court
- Robert Wherry (politician) (fl. 2020s), American politician
