= Sue Newman =

Sue Newman may refer to:

- Sue Newman (squash player)
- Sue Newman (politician)
