= Daniel Eaton =

Daniel Eaton may refer to:

- Daniel Cady Eaton (1834–1895), American botanist and author
- Daniel Isaac Eaton (1753–1814), English radical author and activist
- Daniel Eaton (figure skater) (born 1992), American ice dancer
- Daniel Eaton (cyclist)
- Dan Eaton, American politician
