= David Preece =

David Preece may refer to:

- David Preece (footballer, born 1963) (1963–2007), played for Walsall, Luton Town, Derby County and Cambridge United
- David Preece (footballer, born 1976), played for Darlington, Aberdeen and Silkeborg IF
- David Preece (politician), American politician
