= Joseph Stallcop =

American politician

Joseph P. Stallcop
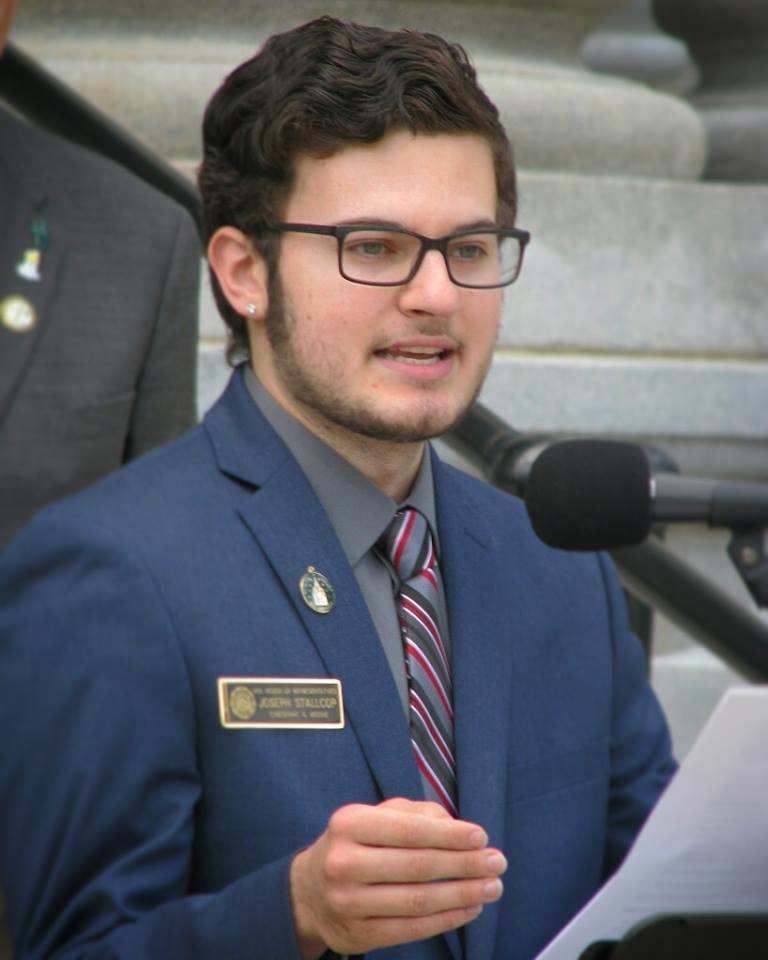

Member of the New Hampshire House of Representatives from the Cheshire 4 district
- In office December 7, 2016 – August 6, 2018
- Preceded by: William Pearson
- Succeeded by: David Morrill

Personal details
- Born: May 7, 1996 (age 30) Saratoga Springs, New York, U.S.
- Party: Libertarian (2017–present)
- Other political affiliations: Democratic (2016–2017)
- Education: Keene State College
- Occupation: Student
- Salary: $100/year
- Committees: None
- Website: Legislative webpage

Joseph P. Stallcop (born May 7, 1996) is an American politician, author, EMT, and former member of the New Hampshire House of Representatives. He was first elected to the chamber in 2016 as a Democrat. In May 2017, Stallcop switched his party affiliation to Libertarian. He served on the House Legislative Administration Committee and as a member of the House Libertarian Caucus led by Rep. Caleb Q. Dyer.

== Personal life ==
Joseph Stallcop was born in Saratoga Springs, New York, on May 7, 1996, to John and Julie Stallcop. When Joseph was young, his father was a Lieutenant Commander in the United States Navy and thus their family moved several times before eventually settling in Gales Ferry, Connecticut, where he was raised. He attended Saint Bernard School, a Catholic private school in Uncasville, Connecticut, from the 6th grade through high school. In 2014, Joseph moved to New Hampshire to attend Keene State College. He is also an author.

== Political career ==
=== Electoral history ===
In June 2016, Stallcop filed to run as a Democratic candidate for the New Hampshire House of Representatives from Cheshire County's 4th district. By the end of the filing period, he was the only candidate in the race on either side. On September 13, 2016, he was elected unopposed for the Democratic nomination. On November 8, 2016, without Republican or write-in opposition, Stallcop was elected to the New Hampshire House of Representatives.

=== Switch to Libertarian Party ===
On May 10, 2017, Stallcop announced that he had changed his voter registration from Democrat to Libertarian. In a speech given on the steps of the New Hampshire State House, Stallcop said that the Libertarian Party was a better fit for those of his views, which he described as classically liberal and civil libertarian. Stallcop also cited his experiences attending the Dakota Access Pipeline protests in North Dakota. Stallcop also said he was frustrated by criticism over his vote to kill legislation to increase the minimum age of marriage to 18 years old and his vote to allow the carrying of concealed guns without a permit.

Stallcop resigned from the New Hampshire House of Representatives on August 6, 2018, citing that he had moved out of Keene following his graduation from college and did not plan to run for re-election.
