= Jim Kofalt =

American politician

Speaker pro tempore of the New Hampshire House of Representatives
- Incumbent
- Assumed office March 10, 2025
- Preceded by: Fred Doucette

Member of the New Hampshire House of Representatives
- Incumbent
- Assumed office December 2, 2020
- Constituency: Hillsborough 4th district (2020–2022); Hillsborough 32nd district (2022–present)

Personal details
- Party: Republican
- Education: Georgetown University (BA); Syracuse University (MBA)

Jim Kofalt is an American politician. He serves as a Republican member for the Hillsborough 32nd district of the New Hampshire House of Representatives. He was selected as speaker pro tempore in March 2025.

New Hampshire House of Representatives
| Preceded by Fred Doucette | Speaker pro tempore of the New Hampshire House of Representatives; 2025–present | Incumbent |
