= Christine Parshall =

American politician

Member-elect of the New Hampshire House of Representatives from the Cheshire 8th district
- Assuming office December 2026
- Succeeding: Lucius Parshall

Personal details
- Party: Democratic

Christine Parshall is an American politician. A member of the Democratic Party, she is the member-elect for the Cheshire 8th district of the New Hampshire House of Representatives.
