= Lawrence Welkowitz =

American politician

Member of New Hampshire House of Representatives for Cheshire 4
- In office December 2, 2020 – December 7, 2022
- Preceded by: David Morrill
- Succeeded by: Jodi Newell

Personal details
- Party: Democratic
- Education: Middlebury College; University of Hawaii

Lawrence Welkowitz is an American psychologist and politician. He was a member of the New Hampshire House of Representatives and represented the Cheshire 4th district from 2020 to 2022.

He is an American clinical psychologist, academic, author, and inventor known for his work on autism spectrum disorders and social anxiety. He is a former professor of psychology at Keene State College and has contributed to research, clinical practice, and the development of communication technologies.

== Early life and education ==
Welkowitz was born in New York City and raised in Metuchen, New Jersey. He earned a Ph.D. in clinical psychology from the University of Hawaiʻi and completed clinical training at NYU/Bellevue Hospital. He is Jewish.

== Academic career ==
Welkowitz served as a professor of psychology at Keene State College in Keene, New Hampshire, where his work focused on autism spectrum disorders, particularly social communication and speech patterns.

He conducted research on the role of acoustic features of speech, including pitch and rhythm, in social interaction and communication.

== Clinical career ==
Welkowitz is a licensed clinical psychologist who has practiced in New Hampshire and Colorado. His clinical work has focused on autism spectrum disorders, anxiety disorders, and mood disorders, using cognitive-behavioral and behavioral approaches.

== Publications ==
Welkowitz is co-author of The Hidden Face of Shyness, published by Avon Books in 1996.

He is also co-editor of Asperger's Syndrome: Intervening in Schools, Clinics, and Communities (2005), a multidisciplinary volume on intervention strategies.

He has co-authored peer-reviewed research with psychiatrist Michael R. Liebowitz on anxiety disorders, including panic disorder.

== Technological contributions ==
Welkowitz is co-inventor of SpeechMatch, a software application designed to provide visual feedback on speech characteristics such as pitch, rhythm, and volume to support communication development.

He holds a United States patent for this technology: Communication system for processing audio input with visual display (U.S. Patent No. 11,315,588), issued April 26, 2022.

== Political career ==
Welkowitz served as a Democratic Party member of the New Hampshire House of Representatives from December 2, 2020 until December 7, 2022, representing a district that includes Keene, New Hampshire.

== Selected works ==
- The Hidden Face of Shyness (1996)
- Asperger's Syndrome: Intervening in Schools, Clinics, and Communities (2005)
- "Cognitive-behavior therapy for panic disorder delivered by psychopharmacologically oriented clinicians" (1991)
