= Camille Pattison =

American politician

Member-elect of the New Hampshire House of Representatives from the Hillsborough 4th district
- Assuming office December 2026
- Succeeding: Sue Newman

Personal details
- Party: Democratic

Camille Pattison is an American politician. A member of the Democratic Party, she is the member-elect for the Hillsborough 4th district of the New Hampshire House of Representatives.
