= David Morrill =

American politician

Dave Morrill

Member of the New Hampshire House of Representatives from the Cheshire 4th district
- In office December 5, 2018 – June 1, 2020
- Preceded by: Joseph Stallcop
- Succeeded by: Lawrence Welkowitz

Personal details
- Party: Democratic
- Education: Keene State College; Antioch University New England

David Morrill is an American politician who served as a member of the New Hampshire House of Representatives from 2018 to 2020.

== Education ==
Morrill earned a B.S. from Keene State College in graphic design and earned an M.B.A. from Antioch University New England.

== Career ==
On November 6, 2018, Morrill was elected to the New Hampshire House of Representatives where he represents the Cheshire 4 district. Morrill assumed office on December 5, 2018. Morrill is a Democrat.

== Personal life ==
Morrill resides in Keene, New Hampshire.
