= Mary Murphy (New Hampshire politician) =

American politician

Member of New Hampshire House of Representatives for Hillsborough 27
- Incumbent
- Assumed office December 4, 2024
- Preceded by: Karen Reid

Personal details
- Party: Republican
- Website: www.marymurphynh.com

Mary Carroll Murphy is an American politician. She is a member of the New Hampshire House of Representatives. Her district covers the towns of Deering and Francestown.

Murphy is a business owner and former Fortune 500 executive from Hillsborough County, New Hampshire.
