= Fred Doucette =

American politician (1964/1965–2026)

- Doucette at the Red Summit, 2017

Speaker pro tempore of the New Hampshire House of Representatives
- In office December 15, 2024 – March 10, 2025
- Preceded by: Laurie Sanborn
- Succeeded by: Jim Kofalt

Member of the New Hampshire House of Representatives
- In office December 3, 2014 – March 10, 2025
- Constituency: Rockingham 8th district (2014–2022); Rockingham 25th district (2022–2025)

Personal details
- Born: 1964 or 1965
- Died: July 28, 2026 (aged 61)
- Party: Republican
- Education: Northern Essex Community College

Fred Doucette (1964 or 1965 – July 28, 2026) was an American politician. He served as a Republican member of the New Hampshire House of Representatives, representing Rockingham County District 8, the town of Salem, New Hampshire. In 2020, Doucette was appointed a deputy Republican leader.

Doucette was the New Hampshire campaign co-chair for Donald Trump's 2016 and 2020 presidential campaigns. In April 2023, he became a senior advisor and state campaign co-chair for Vivek Ramaswamy's 2024 presidential campaign. At the time he was deputy majority leader in the state House of Representatives.

He resigned in March 2025 in order to become the Region 1 administrator of the Federal Emergency Management Agency (FEMA) in Boston.

Doucette died on July 28, 2026.

New Hampshire House of Representatives
Preceded by Laurie Sanborn	Speaker pro tempore of the New Hampshire House of Representatives; 2024–2025	Succeeded by Jim Kofalt
