= Charlene Pedersen =

American politician

Member-elect of the New Hampshire House of Representatives from the Hillsborough 7th district
- Assuming office December 2026
- Succeeding: Catherine Sofikitis

Personal details
- Party: Democratic

Charlene Pedersen is an American politician. A member of the Democratic Party, she is the member-elect for the Hillsborough 7th district of the New Hampshire House of Representatives.
