= Jessica Grill =

American politician

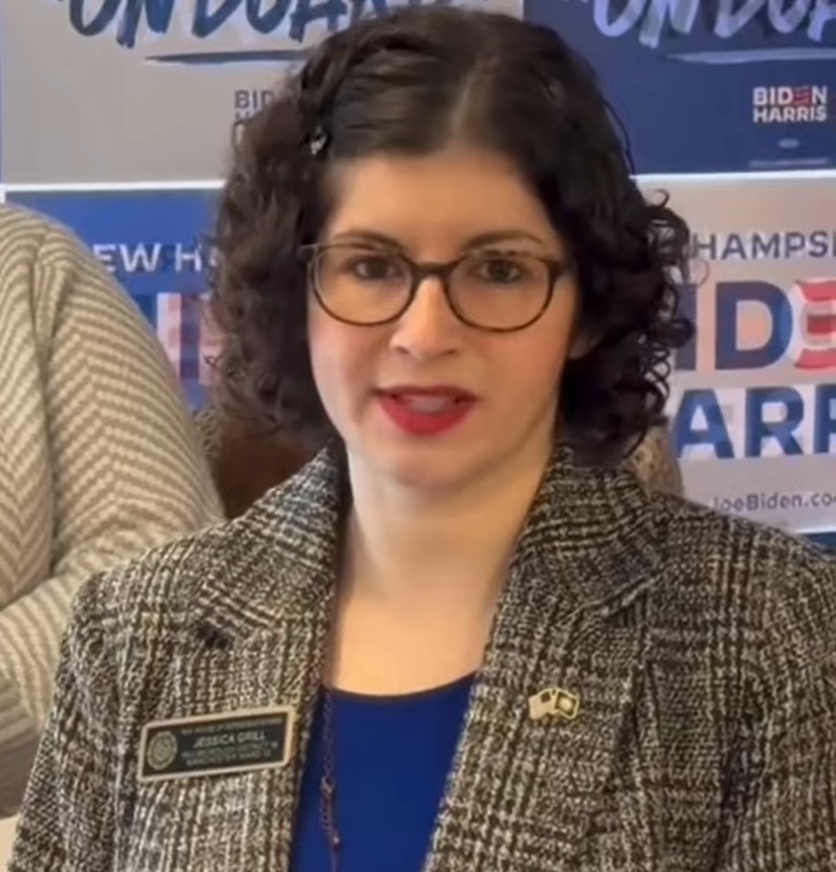
- Grill in 2024

Member of the New Hampshire House of Representatives from the Hillsborough 18th district
- Incumbent
- Assumed office December 7, 2022

Personal details
- Born: 1995 (age 30–31) Manchester, New Hampshire
- Party: Democratic

Jessica Michelle Grill (born 1995) is an American politician. She serves as a Democratic member for the Hillsborough 18th district of the New Hampshire House of Representatives.

== Early life ==
Grill was born in Manchester, New Hampshire. She graduated from Northeastern University. She worked in advertising.

In 2021, Grill served as a local election official, a job she described as '"thankless". She first ran for political office in 2022, and was endorsed by Run for Something. In an interview, Grill cited personal contact as being crucial for victory in state legislature elections.

== Tenure ==
In 2022, Grill was elected to the New Hampshire House of Representatives as one of the two representatives from the Hillsborough 18th district, alongside Juliet Smith. She serves on the Committee on Election Law.

In 2024, Grill sponsored a bill extending the latest time that bars could sell alcohol from 1 a.m. to 2 a.m.

In 2026, after Grill attempted to form a 'Karaoke caucus', GOP representative Travis Corcoran tweeted, "We need a final solution for theater kids in politics." This tweet drew controversy for referencing the 'final solution', especially since Grill is Jewish. Grill called for Corcoran to be expelled from the state legislature. Corcoran was censured for his comments.
