= Edith Hogan =

American politician

Member of New Hampshire House of Representatives for Hillsborough 34
- In office 2014–2016

Member of New Hampshire House of Representatives for Hillsborough 25
- In office 2006–2012

Personal details
- Party: Republican

Edith Dee Hogan is an American politician. She represented Hillsborough County on the New Hampshire House of Representatives from 2006 to 2012, and again from 2014 to 2016.

She was president of Nashua's Women's Club. She was a candidate in 2020, 2022 and 2024.
