= Jodi Newell =

American politician

Member of the New Hampshire House of Representatives from the Cheshire 4th district
- Incumbent
- Assumed office December 7, 2022
- Preceded by: Lawrence Welkowitz

Personal details
- Party: Democratic

Jodi Newell is an American politician. She serves as a Democratic member for the Cheshire 4th district of the New Hampshire House of Representatives.

Newell has been a longtime advocate for substance use treatment, prevention and harm reduction, having lost her fiancé, father to her two children, to heroin overdose in 2008. In his honor and for the benefit of others who have lost loved ones to overdose, she has partnered with a small organizing team to host the Monadnock Overdose Awareness Day vigil, passing a declaration of support unanimously through the Keene City Council in 2023.

As a community organizer, she worked with a national collection of harm reduction advocates to push through and ultimately pass the Mainstreaming Addiction Treatment (MAT) Act. This piece of legislation, first introduced by US Senator Maggie Hassan, removed unnecessary barriers to prescribing buprenorphine to those struggling with Opioid Use Disorder. The MAT Act was signed into law on December 29, 2022.

Having established her career working with the unhoused in a transitional shelter, Newell recognized a need for advocacy in her own community. In 2021, she ran for Councilor At Large in Keene, New Hampshire. After a narrow loss in that race, the following year she ran for and won the seat that she now holds in the NH House of Representatives.

As a first year legislator, Representative Newell was the primary sponsor HB287, a measure which decriminalized the testing strips used to detect the presence of fentanyl and xylozine when mixed with other drugs.

In her second term, which started in 2025, Newell was the primary sponsor of two bills that passed - one establishing the Blue Envelopes Program for drivers with Autism Spectrum Disorders and with trauma related disorders in the state of NH and the other enabling municipalities to regulate the muzzling of demonstrably aggressive dogs in public.

She has cosponsored a variety of legislation related to housing/tenants rights, healthcare, reproductive freedom, mental health and serves on the Criminal Justice and Public Safety Committee.

Newell was arrested on 30 June 2025 on a charge of driving under the influence following a single-vehicle crash.
