= Cathryn Harvey =

American politician

Member of the New Hampshire House of Representatives from the Cheshire 1st district
- In office 2016 – December 7, 2022

Member of the New Hampshire House of Representatives from the Cheshire 6th district
- Incumbent
- Assumed office December 7, 2022

Personal details
- Party: Democratic

Cathryn Harvey is an American politician. She serves as a Democratic member for the Cheshire 6th district of the New Hampshire House of Representatives.
