= Linda Harriott-Gathright =

American politician

Member of the New Hampshire House of Representatives from the Hillsborough 36 district
- Incumbent
- Assumed office December 5, 2018
- In office 2012–2014

Personal details
- Born: Philadelphia, Pennsylvania, U.S.
- Party: Democratic
- Children: 1
- Education: Daniel Webster College (AS, BS)

Linda C. Harriott-Gathright is an American politician serving as a member of the New Hampshire House of Representatives from the Hillsborough 36 district. She assumed office on December 5, 2018.

== Early life and education ==
Born in Philadelphia, Harriott-Gathright graduated from West Philadelphia High School. She earned an Associate of Science degree and Bachelor of Science from Daniel Webster College.

== Career ==
Harriott-Gathright worked for Verizon Communications from 1974 to 2008, where she specialized in contracts. She also served as a member of the Nashua Board of Aldermen, Nashua Board of Health, and Nashua Housing Authority. She served as a member of the New Hampshire House of Representatives for the Hillsborough 36 district from 2012 to 2014 and was elected again in 2018.
