= Michael Abbott =

American politician

Member of the New Hampshire House of Representatives from the Cheshire 1st district
- In office December 3, 2014 – 2022
- Preceded by: William Butynski

Member of the New Hampshire House of Representatives from the Cheshire 6th district
- In office 2022–2024

Personal details
- Party: Democratic
- Spouse: Sharon
- Children: 1
- Education: Longmeadow High School; Brown University; Keene State College

Michael Dennis Abbott is a New Hampshire politician. He served in the New Hampshire House of Representatives from 2014 to 2024.

== Education ==
Abbott graduated from Longmeadow High School. Abbott earned a B.A. from Brown University in 1970 and a M.E.d. from Keene State College in 1986.

== Career ==
Abbott worked as principal of Hinsdale High School in New Hampshire from 1985 to 2000. On November 4, 2014, Abbott was elected as a Democrat to the New Hampshire House of Representatives to represent the Cheshire 1 district. Abbott assumed office on December 3, 2014. He won reelection to the Cheshire 1 district in 2016, 2018, and 2020, and he was elected to represent the Cheshire 6 district in 2022. He did not seek reelection in 2024.

== Personal life ==
Abbott resides in Hinsdale, New Hampshire and has since 1970. Abbott is married to Sharon and has one child.
