= Ray Newman (politician) =

American politician

Member of the New Hampshire House of Representatives from the Hillsborough 29th district
- Incumbent
- Assumed office December 5, 2018
- Succeeded by: Renae Lias (elect)

Personal details
- Party: Democratic
- Spouse: Sue Newman

Military service
- Allegiance: United States Army

Raymond Newman is a New Hampshire politician.

== Military career ==
Newman served in the United States Army.

== Political career ==
On November 6, 2018, Newman was elected to the New Hampshire House of Representatives where he represents the Hillsborough 29 district. He assumed office on December 5, 2018. He is a Democrat.

== Personal life ==
Newman resides in Nashua, New Hampshire. Ray is married to fellow state representative Sue Newman. Together they have three children and six grandchildren.
