= Jeffrey Goley =

American politician

Member of the New Hampshire House of Representatives from the Hillsborough 37th district
- In office 1998–2002

Member of the New Hampshire House of Representatives from the Hillsborough 8th district
- In office 2004 – December 7, 2022

Member of the New Hampshire House of Representatives from the Hillsborough 21st district
- Incumbent
- Assumed office December 7, 2022

Personal details
- Party: Democratic

Jeffrey Goley is an American politician. He serves as a Democratic member for the Hillsborough 21st district of the New Hampshire House of Representatives.

Goley has revitalized the Sportsmen’s Caucus, which has grown significantly under his leadership, highlighting the importance of outdoor recreation in New Hampshire's economy.
