= Catherine Sofikitis =

American politician

Member of the New Hampshire House of Representatives from the Hillsborough 34th district
- Incumbent
- Assumed office December 7, 2016
- Succeeded by: Charlene Pedersen (elect)

Personal details
- Party: Democratic

Catherine Sofikitis is a New Hampshire politician.

== Career ==
On November 8, 2016, Sofikitis was elected to the New Hampshire House of Representatives where she represents the Hillsborough 34 district. She is a Democrat. Sofikitis endorsed Bernie Sanders in the 2020 Democratic Party presidential primaries.

== Personal life ==
Sofikitis resides in Nashua, New Hampshire. She is married and has one child.
