= Jordan Ulery =

American politician (born 1949)

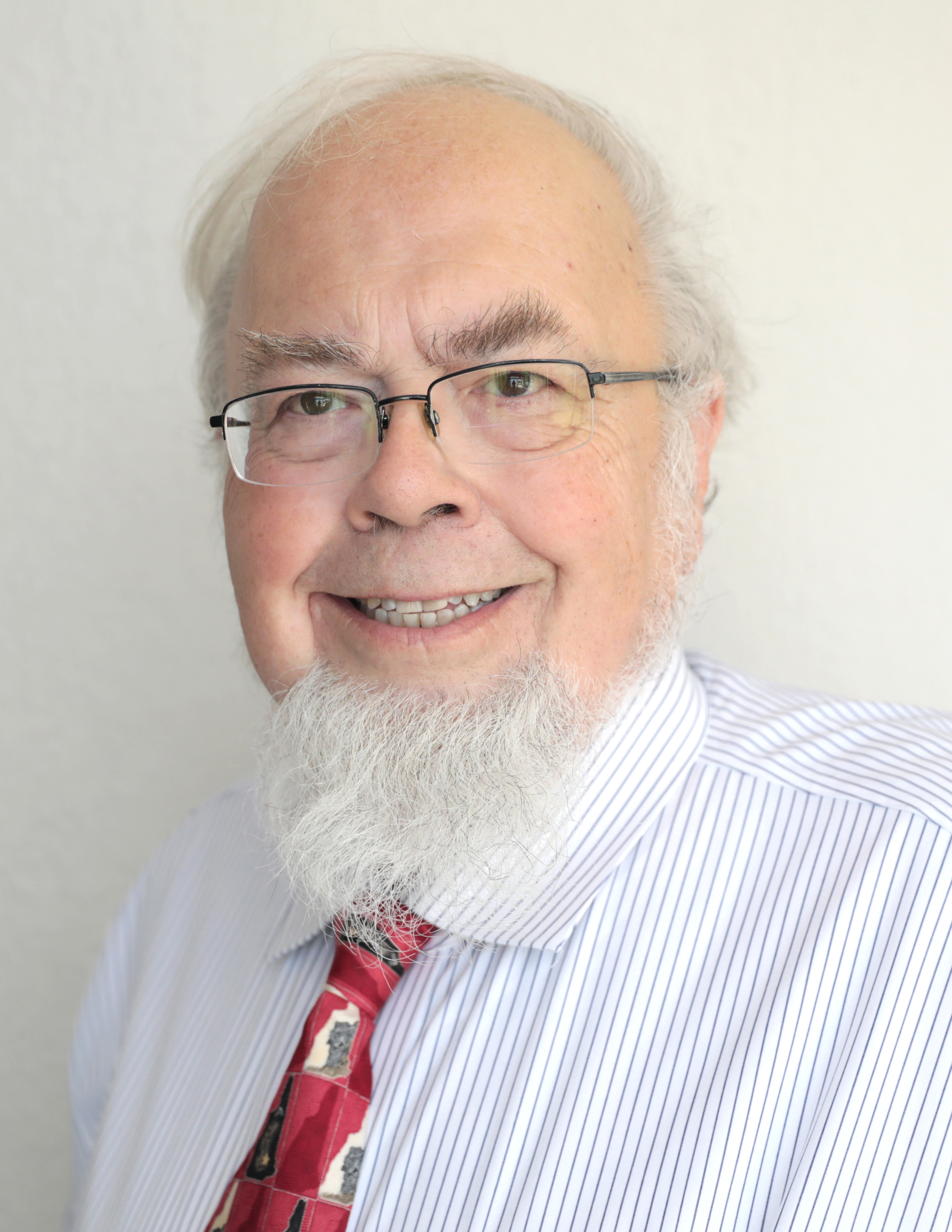

Member of the New Hampshire House of Representatives from the Hillsborough 13th district
- Incumbent
- Assumed office 2004

Personal details
- Born: October 19, 1949 (age 77) Elkhart, Indiana, U.S.
- Party: Republican
- Education: St. Anselm College
- Occupation: fraud investigator

Jordan Ulery (born October 19, 1949) is an American politician in the state of New Hampshire. They are a member of the New Hampshire House of Representatives, sitting as a Republican from the Hillsborough 37 district, having been first elected in 2004.
