= Donald Bouchard (politician) =

American politician

Member of the New Hampshire House of Representatives from the Hillsborough 24th district
- In office December 7, 2022 – July 21, 2025

Member of the New Hampshire House of Representatives from the Hillsborough 11th district
- In office 2018 – December 7, 2022

Personal details
- Party: Democratic

Donald Bouchard is an American politician. He served as a Democratic member for the Hillsborough 24th district of the New Hampshire House of Representatives. He resigned in July 2025.

== Early life ==
Bouchard taught physical science in public school for 45 years in middle school.
