= Allison Nutting-Wong =

American politician (born c.1991)

Member of the New Hampshire House of Representatives
- Incumbent
- Assumed office December 5, 2018
- Constituency: Hillsborough 32nd
- In office December 7, 2016 – May 24, 2018
- Constituency: Hillsborough 34th

Personal details
- Born: c. 1991 (age 34–35)
- Party: Democratic
- Education: Russell Sage College

Allison Nutting-Wong (born c. 1991) is a New Hampshire, United States, politician.

== Early life and education ==
Nutting-Wong was born around 1991. Nutting-Wong earned a BA in political science from Russell Sage College.

== Career ==
Nutting-Wong worked for 10 years as an office manager. In 2014, Nutting-Wong ran unsuccessfully for one of the New Hampshire House of Representatives seats representing the Hillsborough 34 district. In 2015, Nutting-Wong ran unsuccessfully for the position of at-large representative of the Nashua School District. On November 8, 2016, Nutting-Wong was elected to the New Hampshire House of Representatives where she represented the Hillsborough 34 district until May 24, 2018, when she resigned after moving out of the district. On November 6, 2018, Nutting-Wong was elected to the New Hampshire House of Representatives where she represents the Hillsborough 32 district. She assumed office on December 5, 2018. She is a Democrat.

== Personal life ==
Nutting-Wong resides in Nashua, New Hampshire. Nutting-Wong is married to Matthew, and together they have one son.

In 2022, the New Hampshire Union Leader published an op-ed authored by Nutting-Wong in which she described her experience with a recent miscarriage.
