= Cathy Kenny (politician) =

American politician from New Hampshire

Member of the New Hampshire House of Representatives from the Hillsborough 13th district
- Incumbent
- Assumed office December 7, 2022

Personal details
- Party: Republican

Cathy Kenny is an American politician. She serves as a Republican member for the Hillsborough 13th district of the New Hampshire House of Representatives.

Kenny was a veterinarian at the Amherst Animal Hospital.
