= Linda DiSilvestro =

American politician

Member of the New Hampshire House of Representatives from the Hillsborough 17th district
- Incumbent
- Assumed office December 7, 2022
- Succeeded by: Rob Fox (elect)

Member of the New Hampshire House of Representatives from the Hillsborough 9th district
- In office December 5, 2012 – December 7, 2022

Personal details
- Party: Democratic

Linda DiSilvestro is an American politician. She serves as a Democratic member for the Hillsborough 17th district of the New Hampshire House of Representatives.
