= Lucius Parshall =

American politician

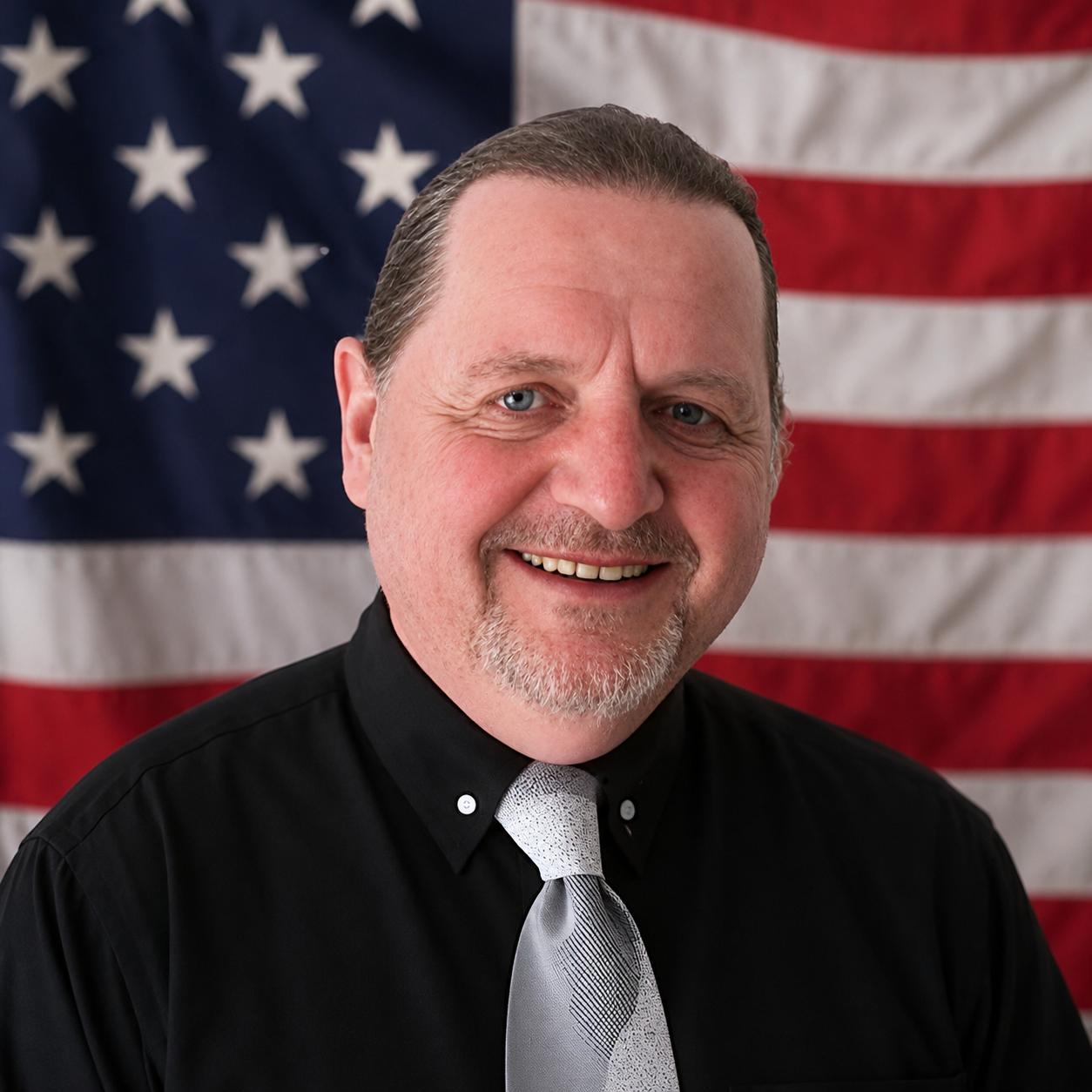

Member of the New Hampshire House of Representatives from the Cheshire 10th district
- In office 2020 – December 7, 2022

Member of the New Hampshire House of Representatives from the Cheshire 8th district
- Incumbent
- Assumed office December 7, 2022
- Succeeded by: Christine Parshall (elect)

Personal details
- Party: Democratic
- Education: Ithaca College (BM); Binghamton University MBA)

Lucius Parshall is an American politician. He serves as a Democratic member for the Cheshire 8th district of the New Hampshire House of Representatives.
