= Laurie Sanborn =

American politician

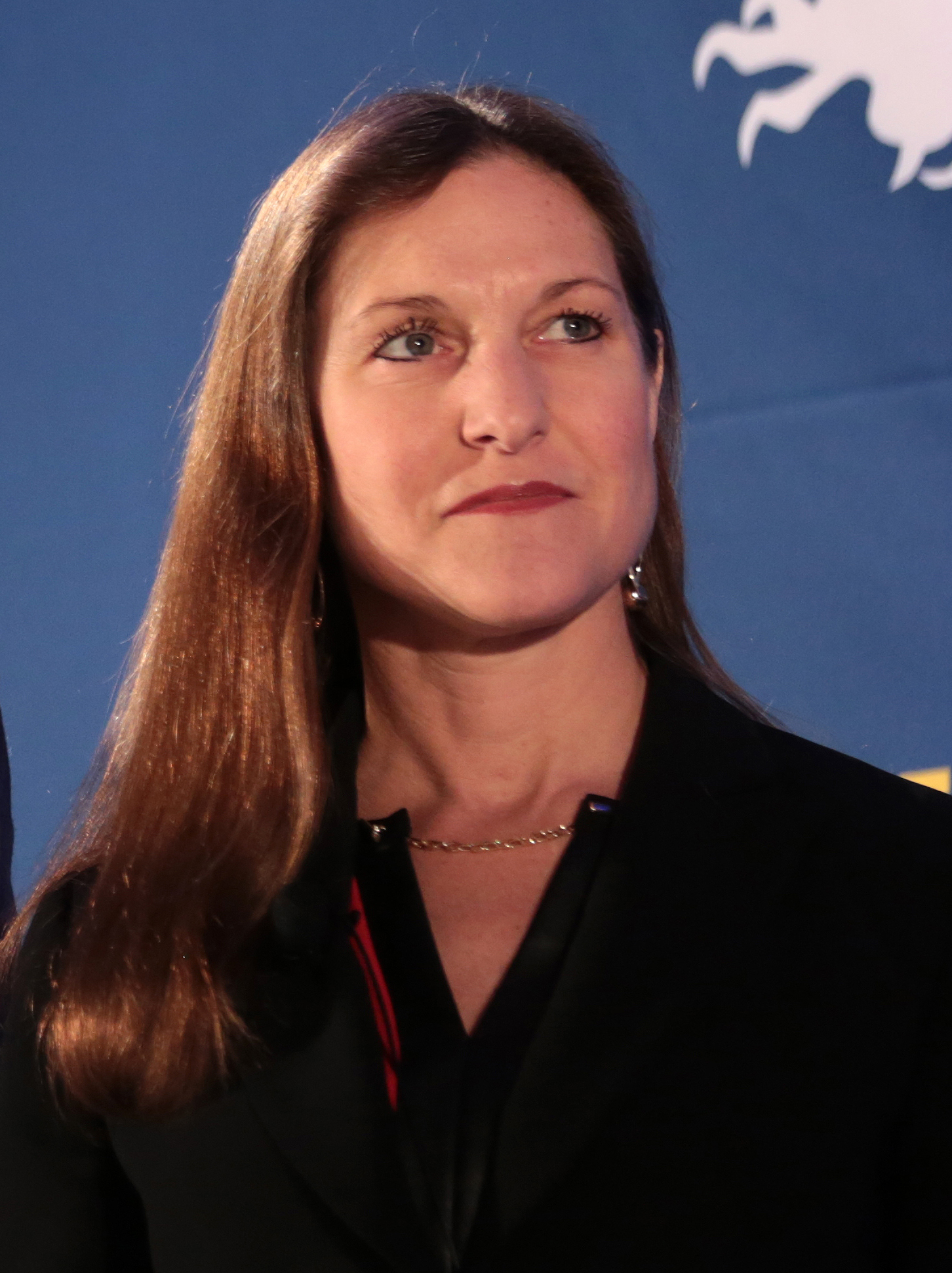

Speaker pro tempore of the New Hampshire House of Representatives
- In office December 7, 2022 – December 4, 2024
- Preceded by: Kimberly Rice
- Succeeded by: Fred Doucette

Member of the New Hampshire House of Representatives
- In office December 5, 2012 – December 4, 2024
- Constituency: Hillsborough 41st district
- In office December 1, 2010 – June 5, 2012
- Constituency: Merrimack 5th district

Personal details
- Born: Nashua, New Hampshire, U.S.
- Party: Republican
- Education: Simmons University (BA)

Laurie Sanborn is an American politician in the state of New Hampshire. She is a former member of the New Hampshire House of Representatives. A Republican from the Hillsborough 41 district, she was first elected in 2012. Sanborn served as Deputy Majority Leader starting on December 2, 2020. Sanborn served in the House previously, representing Merrimack 5 from 2010 until her resignation on June 5, 2012.

== Controversy ==
In 2023, Sanborn resigned as chairwoman of the commission to Study the Effect of Recent Changes Made to the Charitable Gaming Laws. This happened after she was named in an investigation of her husband, former State Senator Andy Sanborn, and his alleged illegal use of $844,000 in pandemic assistance.

New Hampshire House of Representatives
| Preceded by Kimberly Rice | Speaker pro tempore of the New Hampshire House of Representatives; 2022–2024 | Succeeded by Fred Doucette |
