= Rich Nalevanko =

American politician

Member of New Hampshire House of Representatives for Cheshire 9
- Incumbent
- Assumed office December 4, 2024
- Preceded by: Dan Eaton

Personal details
- Party: Republican
- Education: Cornell University; University of Pittsburgh
- Website: www.richnalevanko.com

Richard (Rich) M. Nalevanko is an American politician. He is a member of the New Hampshire House of Representatives.

Nalevanko is a retired Fortune 100 executive. He graduated from Cornell University and the University of Pittsburgh.
