= Heidi Hamer =

American politician

Member of the New Hampshire House of Representatives from the Hillsborough 17th district
- In office 2018 – December 7, 2022

Member of the New Hampshire House of Representatives from the Hillsborough 19th district
- Incumbent
- Assumed office December 7, 2022

Personal details
- Party: Democratic

Heidi Hamer is an American politician. She serves as a Democratic member for the Hillsborough 19th district of the New Hampshire House of Representatives.
