= Sallie Fellows =

American politician

Member of the New Hampshire House of Representatives from the Grafton 8th district
- Incumbent
- Assumed office December 5, 2018
- Preceded by: Travis Bennett

Personal details
- Party: Democratic
- Education: Skidmore College (BA); University of Massachusetts Amherst (MEd); Southern New Hampshire University
- Website: Fellows 4 NH

Military service
- Allegiance: United States
- Branch/service: United States Army
- Rank: Sergeant

Sallie Fellows is a New Hampshire politician.

== Education ==
Fellows graduated from Skidmore College with a B.A. in psychology, the University of Massachusetts Amherst with a M.Ed. in education administration, and Southern New Hampshire University with a graduate certificate in school business administration.

== Military career ==
Fellows was a sergeant in the United States Army.

== Professional career ==
On November 6, 2018, Fellows was elected to the New Hampshire House of Representatives where she represents the Grafton 8 district. Fellows assumed office on December 5, 2018. Fellows is a Democrat. Fellows endorses Bernie Sanders in the 2020 Democratic Party presidential primaries.

== Personal life ==
Fellows resides in Holderness, New Hampshire.
