= Andrew Prout =

American politician

Member of the New Hampshire House of Representatives from the Hillsborough 37th district
- Incumbent
- Assumed office December 7, 2016

Personal details
- Party: Republican

Andrew Prout is a New Hampshire politician.

== Career ==
On November 8, 2016, Prout was elected to the New Hampshire House of Representatives where he represents the Hillsborough 37 district. He assumed office later in 2016. He is a Republican.

== Personal life ==
Prout resides in Hudson, New Hampshire. Prout is married and has three children.
