= Rosemarie Rung =

American politician

Member of the New Hampshire House of Representatives from the Hillsborough 21st district
- Incumbent
- Assumed office December 5, 2018
- Succeeded by: Marc Nozell (elect)

Personal details
- Party: Democratic

Rosemarie Rung is an American politician serving as a Democratic member of the New Hampshire House of Representatives since 2018.

== Education ==
Rung earned a BS in biochemistry.

== Career ==
On November 6, 2018, Rung was elected to the New Hampshire House of Representatives where she represents the Hillsborough 21 district. She assumed office on December 5, 2018.

In January 2021, House Speaker Sherman Packard removed Rung from her committee assignments following a social-media post in which she urged New Hampshire police to denounce the Troy police chief's attendance at the January 6 rally in Washington, D.C. The Speaker later ordered Rung to leave a committee meeting, citing House rules and decorum concerns. The actions drew coverage from regional outlets and wire services.

In February 2022, Rung faced criticism from some fellow Democrats over comments about considering “context” around the use of a racial slur amid an intra-caucus dispute. The dispute involved allegations that a fellow Democratic legislator had used a racial slur. In a post discussing the incident, Rung wrote that "the n-word is never acceptable, but having context helps understand the motivation," and drew an analogy to evaluating self-defense in a physical altercation. Her comments were interpreted by some activists and progressive organizations as attempting to justify or excuse the language, prompting widespread criticism within the state party. Rung later clarified that she did not condone the use of racial slurs, stating that her intent was to encourage understanding of the circumstances surrounding the exchange. She also expressed concern that her colleague had “been under immense stress from antisemitism and felt threatened … because she is Jewish.”

== Personal life ==
Rung resides in Merrimack, New Hampshire. Rung is married and has three children.
