= Juliet Smith =

American politician

Member of the New Hampshire House of Representatives from the Hillsborough 18th district
- Incumbent
- Assumed office December 7, 2022

Personal details
- Party: Democratic

Juliet Smith is an American politician. She serves as a Democratic member for the Hillsborough 18th district of the New Hampshire House of Representatives.
