= David Preece (politician) =

American politician

Member of the New Hampshire House of Representatives from the Hillsborough 17th district
- Incumbent
- Assumed office December 7, 2022
- Succeeded by: Sean Parr (elect)

Personal details
- Born: Ogden, Utah
- Party: Democratic

David Preece is an American politician. He serves as a Democratic member for the Hillsborough 17th district of the New Hampshire House of Representatives.
