= Sue Newman (politician) =

American politician

Member of the New Hampshire House of Representatives from the Hillsborough 29th district
- Incumbent
- Assumed office December 2016
- Succeeded by: Camille Pattison (elect)

Personal details
- Born: Rochester, New York
- Party: Democratic
- Spouse: Ray Newman

Sue Newman is a New Hampshire politician.

== Early life ==
Newman was born in Rochester, New York. In 1981, Newman moved to Nashua, New Hampshire after at different times living in Germany, Florida, Georgia and Virginia.

== Education ==
Newman went to college for two years.

== Political career ==
On November 8, 2016, Newman was elected to the New Hampshire House of Representatives where she represents the Hillsborough 29 district. She assumed office later in 2016. She is a Democrat.

== Personal life ==
Sue Newman resides in Nashua, New Hampshire. Sue is married to fellow state representative Ray Newman. Together they have three children and six grandchildren.
