= Karen Reid =

American politician

Member of the New Hampshire House of Representatives from the Hillsborough 27th district
- In office December 7, 2022 – December 4, 2024
- Succeeded by: Mary Murphy

Personal details
- Party: Republican

Karen Reid is an American politician. She served as a Republican member for the Hillsborough 27th district of the New Hampshire House of Representatives.
