= Dan Eaton =

American politician (born 1956)

Member of the New Hampshire House of Representatives from the Cheshire 3rd district
- In office December 5, 2012 – December 4, 2024
- Succeeded by: Rich Nalevanko

Personal details
- Born: April 15, 1956 (age 70) Keene, New Hampshire, U.S.
- Party: Democratic
- Occupation: businessman, consultant

Daniel Adams Eaton (born April 15, 1956) is an American politician in the state of New Hampshire. He was a member of the New Hampshire House of Representatives, sitting as a Democrat from the Cheshire 3 district, having been first elected in 2012. He previously served from 1976 to 1990 and 2002 to 2010.
