= Robert Wherry (politician) =

American politician

Member of the New Hampshire House of Representatives from the Hillsborough 13th district
- Incumbent
- Assumed office December 7, 2022

Personal details
- Party: Republican

Robert Wherry is an American politician. He serves as a Republican member for the Hillsborough 13th district of the New Hampshire House of Representatives.
