= 2025–2026 New Hampshire state legislative special elections =

Special elections to the 168th General Court

- 2025–2026

3 seats in the New Hampshire House of Representatives as of March 2026 201 seats needed for a majority
	Majority party	Minority party
Party	Republican	Democratic
Won in 2024	222	178
Seats up	2	1
Seats won	1	2
Seats change	▼1	▲1

As of July 3, 2025, two state legislative special elections are scheduled to be held in the U.S. state of New Hampshire during the 2025–2026 legislative session. Both elections are for the New Hampshire House of Representatives. At 400 members, the state house is the largest state legislative body in the United States, and the fourth largest lower house in the English-speaking world. As members are only paid $100 per year plus travel costs, turnover tends to be frequent, as members resign or die mid-term, resulting in a special election to replace them. According to the Constitution of the State of New Hampshire, if there is a vacancy in the New Hampshire General Court, a special election must be called to fill the vacant seat within 21 days of receiving proof of a vacancy or a request that a vacancy be filled. Nine special elections were called during the 2023–2024 session, five in 2023 and four in 2024.

== Strafford 12 ==
New Hampshire House District Strafford 12 special election
- June 24, 2025
Candidate	Billie Butler	Ken Hilton
Party	Democratic	Republican
Popular vote	964	774
Percentage	55.47%	44.53%
- Town results Butler: 50–60%
Representative before election
Dawn Evans (elect)
Democratic
Elected Representative
Billie Butler
Democratic

Strafford 12 is a multi-member district in Strafford County that elects four representatives using plurality block voting. It contains the town of Rollinsford and all 5 wards from Somersworth. The special election was made necessary after Democrat Dawn Evans did not assume office after being elected in 2024, as she had moved out of the district. The special election was held on June 24, 2025, with a primary on May 6, 2025. Democratic nominee Billie Butler won the special election.

=== Background ===
Voter party registration in the towns of Rollinsford and Somersworth as of May 5, 2025, per the office of the Secretary of State:
1. Democratic (32.6%)
2. Republican (26.5%)
3. Undeclared (40.8%)

Of the 9,757 registered voters in Strafford 12, 3,186 (33%) are Democrats, 2,586 (27%) are Republicans, and 3,985 (41%) are unaffiliated. In the past two elections, it sent four Democrats to the state house. According to data from Dave's Redistricting, it voted for Democratic presidential nominee Kamala Harris by 11.69 percentage points in the 2024 presidential election.

=== Recent results (2022–present) ===
Year	Democrats			Republicans			Others		Ref.
2024	✓ Dawn Evans	4,110	14.33%	Ken Hilton	3,446	12.02%			
2024	✓ Myles England	3,992	13.92%	Jonathan Wilson	3,221	11.23%			
2024	✓ John Joseph Stone	3,961	13.81%	Padraic O'Hare	3,101	10.81%			
2024	✓ Wayne Pearson	3,905	13.62%	Will Milus	2,925	10.20%			
2024	Total Dem.	15,968	55.68%	Total Rep.	12,693	44.26%	15	0.05%	
2022	✓ Kenneth Vincent (r)	3,153	14.76%	Ken Hilton	2,470	11.56%			
2022	✓ Cecilia Rich (r)	3,095	14.49%	Matthew Spencer	2,309	10.81%			
2022	✓ Gerri Cannon (r)	3,043	14.24%	Nick Boyle	2,245	10.51%			
2022	✓ Jeffrey Rich	2,860	13.39%	Steven McMahon	2,190	10.25%			
2022	Total Dem.	12,151	56.87%	Total Rep.	9,214	43.13%			

(r) = incumbent redistricted

=== Democratic nominee ===
Performing artist and gig worker Billie Butler went unopposed for the Democratic nomination, receiving 187 votes in the primary.

=== Republican primary ===
==== Nominee ====
- Ken Hilton, plumber and candidate for this district in 2024 and 2022

==== Eliminated in primary ====
- Nick Boyle, candidate for this district in 2022

==== Results ====
2025 New Hampshire House of Representatives Strafford 12 special Republican primary
Party	Candidate	Votes	%
Republican	Ken Hilton	150	88.76%
Republican	Nick Boyle	19	11.24%
Total votes		169	100.00%
Turnout		169	6.54%
Registered electors		2,586 (R)	

Results by town
Town	Hilton		Boyle		Total
Rollinsford	39	84.78%	7	15.22%	46
Somersworth	111	90.24%	12	9.76%	123

=== General election ===
2025 New Hampshire House of Representatives Strafford 12 special election
Party	Candidate	Votes	%
Democratic	Billie Butler	964	55.47%
Republican	Ken Hilton	774	44.53%
Total votes		1,738	100.00%
Turnout		1,738	17.81%
Registered electors		9,757	

Results by town
Town	Butler		Hilton		Total
Rollinsford	268	59.56%	182	40.44%	450
Somersworth	696	54.04%	592	45.96%	1,288

== Coos 5 ==
New Hampshire House District Coos 5 special election
- November 4, 2025
Candidate	Marc Tremblay	Corinne Cascadden
Party	Republican	Democratic
Initial count	878; 50.40%	864; 49.60%
Recount	878; 50.14%	873; 49.86%
Representative before election
Brian Valerino
Republican
Elected Representative
Marc Tremblay
Republican

Coos 5 is a multimember district in Coös County, electing 2 members to the New Hampshire House of Representatives. It contains the city of Berlin. Incumbent Brian Valerino resigned on June 19, 2025, after being appointed warden of the Northern New Hampshire Correctional Facility. The special election was held on November 4, 2025.

Republican Marc Tremblay narrowly defeated former Democratic state representative Corinne Cascadden in the election. A recount was conducted, confirming Tremblay’s victory but reducing his margin to five votes. According to New Hampshire's Secretary of State David Scanlan, there was no clear explanation for the discrepancy between the 1,794 ballots reported as cast by city officials and the 10 additional votes tallied by the three recount teams. The recount determined that Cascadden gained nine of those additional votes, including one write-in ballot, while Tremblay’s total remained unchanged.

=== Recent results (2022–present) ===
Year	Winning Candidates			Losing Candidates			Others		Ref.
2024	✓ Brian Valerino	2,032	27.86%	Corinne Cascadden	1,768	24.24%			
2024	✓ Peter Morency	1,932	26.48%	Henry W. Noel	1,561	21.40%			
2024	Total Rep.	3,964	54.34%	Total Dem.	3,329	45.63%	2	0.03%	
2022	✓ Corinne Cascadden	1,519	28.41%	Lori Korzen	1,361	25.46%			
2022	✓ Henry W. Noel	1,418	26.53%	Justin Hale	1,048	19.60%			
2022	Total Dem.	2,937	54.94%	Total Rep.	2,409	45.06%			

=== Democratic nominee ===
Former representative Corinne Cascadden went unopposed for the Democratic nomination, receiving 188 votes in the primary.

=== Republican primary ===
==== Nominee ====
- Marc Tremblay, former New Hampshire House of Representatives from Coos 4 from 2010 to 2012

==== Eliminated in primary ====
- Johnathan Henson

==== Results ====
2025 New Hampshire House of Representatives Coos 5 special Republican primary
Party	Candidate	Votes	%
Republican	Marc Tremblay	157	94.01%
Republican	Johnathan Henson	10	5.99%
Total votes		167	100.00%
Turnout			
Registered electors			

=== General election ===
2025 New Hampshire House of Representatives Coos 5 special election
Party	Candidate	Votes	%
Republican	Marc Tremblay	878	50.14%
Democratic	Corinne Cascadden	873	49.86%
Total votes		1,751	100.00%
Turnout			
Registered electors			

== Carroll 7 ==
New Hampshire House District Carroll 7 special election
- March 10, 2026
Candidate	Bobbi Boudman	Dale Fincher
Party	Democratic	Republican
Popular vote	2,207	2,042
Percentage	51.94%	48.06%
Representative before election
Glenn Cordelli
Republican
Elected Representative
Bobbi Boudman
Democratic

Carroll 7 is a district in Carroll County, electing a member to the New Hampshire House of Representatives. Incumbent Glenn Cordelli resigned on November 12, 2025, after moving out of state. The special election was held on March 10, 2026.

Democrat Bobbi Boudman narrowly defeated Republican Dale Fincher in the election, flipping the district.

=== Recent results (2022–present) ===
Year	Winning Candidate			Losing Candidate			Ref.
2024	✓ Glenn Cordelli	5,095	56.8%	Bobbi Boudman	3,871	43.1%	
2022	✓ Glenn Cordelli	4,119	56.2%	Bobbi Boudman	3,203	43.7%	

=== Democratic nominee ===
Bobbi Boudman went unopposed for the Democratic nomination, receiving 615 votes in the primary.

=== Republican primary ===
==== Nominee ====
- Dale Fincher

==== Eliminated in primary ====
- Dallas Emery Jr.
- Jenna Dancy
- Seamas Oscalaidhe

==== Results ====
2026 New Hampshire House of Representatives Carroll 7 special Republican primary
Party	Candidate	Votes	%
Republican	Dale Fincher (write-in)	771	64.46%
Republican	Dallas Emery Jr.	223	18.65%
Republican	Jenna Dancy (write-in)	175	14.63%
Republican	Seamas Oscalaidhe	27	2.26%
Total votes		1,196	100.00%
Turnout			
Registered electors			

=== General election ===
2026 New Hampshire House of Representatives Carroll 7 special election
Party	Candidate	Votes	%
Democratic	Bobbi Boudman	2,207	51.94%
Republican	Dale Fincher	2,042	48.06%
Total votes		4,249	100.00%
Turnout			
Registered electors			
