= 2022 New Hampshire House of Representatives election in Carroll County =

- November 8, 2022

All 15 seats representing Carroll County in the New Hampshire House of Representatives
	Majority party	Minority party
Party	Republican	Democratic
Last election	9 seats	6 seats
Seats before	9	6
Seats after	10	5
Seat change	▲1	▼1

For 2022 New Hampshire House of Representatives election in Carroll County, all 15 out of 400 seats representing Belknap County in New Hampshire House of Representatives were up for election.

== Detailed results ==
- Source for Republican primary results, Carroll County:
- Source for Democratic primary results, Carroll County:
- Reference for general election results, Carroll County:

=== Carroll 1 ===
- Elects three representatives

Democratic primary

Carroll 1 Democratic primary
Party	Candidate	Votes	%
Democratic	Stephen Woodcock (incumbent)	559	35.54
Democratic	Tom Buco (incumbent)	512	32.55
Democratic	David Paige	482	30.64
Republican	Mark Hounsell (write-in)	6	0.38
Republican	Karen Umberger (incumbent) (write-in)	5	0.32
Republican	Frank McCarthy (write-in)	3	0.19
Republican	Michael DiGregorio (write-in)	2	0.13
Republican	Joseph Mosca (write-in)	1	0.06
Write-in	Misc. Write-ins	3	0.19
Total votes		1,573	100.0

Republican primary

Carroll 1 Republican primary
Party	Candidate	Votes	%
Republican	Karen Umberger (incumbent)	578	28.35
Republican	Frank McCarthy	457	22.41
Republican	Michael DiGregorio	445	21.82
Republican	Mark Hounsell	445	21.82
Republican	Joseph Mosca	107	5.25
Write-in	Write-ins	7	0.34
Total votes		2,039	100.0

Michael DiGregorio won a tiebreaker, advancing to the general election over Mark Hounsell. General election

Carroll 1 general election, 2022
Party	Candidate	Votes	%
Democratic	Stephen Woodcock (incumbent)	2,375	19.96
Democratic	Tom Buco (incumbent)	2,206	18.54
Democratic	David Paige	2,129	17.90
Republican	Karen Umberger (incumbent)	1,835	15.43
Republican	Michael DiGregorio	1,730	14.54
Republican	Frank McCarthy	1,614	13.57
Write-in	Write-ins	7	0.06
Total votes		11,896	100.0

=== Carroll 2 ===
- Elects two representatives

Democratic election

Carroll 2 Democratic primary
Party	Candidate	Votes	%
Democratic	Anita Burroughs (incumbent)	825	56.4
Democratic	Chris McAleer (incumbent)	636	43.5
Write-in	Write-ins	2	0.1
Total votes		1,463	100.0

Republican primary

Carroll 2 Republican primary
Party	Candidate	Votes	%
Republican	Gene G. Chandler (write-in)	56	43.1
Write-in	Misc. Write-ins	74	56.9
Total votes		130	100.0

General election

Carroll 2 general election, 2022
Party	Candidate	Votes	%
Democratic	Anita Burroughs (incumbent)	2,417	31.00
Democratic	Chris McAleer (incumbent)	2,232	28.62
Republican	Gene G. Chandler	1,827	23.42
Republican	Daniel Bacon	1,319	16.91
Write-in	Write-ins	3	0.04
Total votes		7,798	100.0

=== Carroll 3 ===
- Elects two representatives

Republican primary

Carroll 3 Republican primary
Party	Candidate	Votes	%
Republican	Richard Brown	869	36.10
Republican	Karel Crawford (incumbent)	827	34.36
Republican	George Mottram	702	29.16
Write-in	Write-ins	9	0.37
Total votes		2,407	100.0

Democratic election

Carroll 3 Democratic primary
Party	Candidate	Votes	%
Democratic	Gabrielle Watson	791	51.83
Democratic	Peaco Todd	730	47.84
Republican	Karel Crawford (incumbent) (write-in)	3	0.20
Republican	Richard Brown (write-in)	2	0.13
Total votes		1,526	100.0

General election

Carroll 3 general election, 2022
Party	Candidate	Votes	%
Republican	Karel Crawford (incumbent)	3,000	27.8
Republican	Richard Brown	2,947	27.3
Democratic	Gabrielle Watson	2,552	23.6
Democratic	Peaco Todd	2,291	21.2
Write-in	Write-ins	11	0.1
Total votes		10,801	100.0

=== Carroll 4 ===
- Elects two representatives

Republican primary

Carroll 4 Republican primary
Party	Candidate	Votes	%
Republican	Lino Avellani (incumbent)	979	53.3
Republican	Mike Belcher	849	46.2
Write-in	Write-ins	9	0.5
Total votes		1,837	100.0

Democratic election

Carroll 4 Democratic primary
Party	Candidate	Votes	%
Democratic	Max Gehring	473	52.79
Democratic	Knute Ogren	415	46.32
Republican	Lino Avellani (incumbent) (write-in)	4	0.45
Republican	Mike Belcher (write-in)	3	0.33
Write-in	Misc. Write-ins	1	0.12
Total votes		896	100.0

General election

Carroll 4 general election, 2022
Party	Candidate	Votes	%
Republican	Lino Avellani (incumbent)	2,771	31.2
Republican	Mike Belcher	2,636	29.7
Democratic	Knute Ogren	1,801	20.3
Democratic	Max Gehring	1,679	18.9
Total votes		8,887	100.0

=== Carroll 5 ===
- Elects one representative

Republican primary

Carroll 5 Republican primary
Party	Candidate	Votes	%
Republican	Jonathan Smith (incumbent)	466	96.1
Write-in	Write-ins	19	3.9
Total votes		485	100.0

Democratic election

Carroll 5 Democratic primary
Party	Candidate	Votes	%
Democratic	Patricia Pustell	183	93.8
Write-in	Write-ins	12	6.2
Total votes		195	100.0

General election

Carroll 5 general election, 2022
Party	Candidate	Votes	%
Republican	Jonathan Smith (incumbent)	1,211	61.8
Democratic	Patricia Pustell	743	37.9
Write-in	Write-ins	4	0.2
Total votes		1,958	100.0

=== Carroll 6 ===
- Elects two representatives

Republican primary

Carroll 6 Republican primary
Party	Candidate	Votes	%
Republican	Katy Peternel	1,093	33.3
Republican	John MacDonald (incumbent)	899	27.4
Republican	Brodie Deshaies (incumbent)	849	25.9
Republican	Lawrence Borland	417	12.7
Write-in	Write-ins	26	0.8
Total votes		3,284	100.0

Democratic election

Carroll 6 Democratic primary
Party	Candidate	Votes	%
Democratic	Carrie Duran	707	53.93
Democratic	Gogi Millner	596	45.46
Republican	Brodie Deshaies (incumbent) (write-in)	3	0.23
Republican	Lawrence Borland (write-in)	1	0.08
Republican	Katy Peternel (write-in)	1	0.08
Write-in	Misc. Write-ins	3	0.23
Total votes		1,311	100.0

General election

Carroll 6 general election, 2022
Party	Candidate	Votes	%
Republican	Katy Peternel	2,821	28.2
Republican	John MacDonald (incumbent)	2,781	27.8
Democratic	Carrie Duran	2,314	23.1
Democratic	Gogi Millner	2,081	20.8
Write-in	Write-ins	12	0.1
Total votes		10,009	100.0

=== Carroll 7 ===
- Elects one representative

Republican primary

Carroll 7 Republican primary
Party	Candidate	Votes	%
Republican	Glenn Cordelli (incumbent)	1,839	98.0
Write-in	Write-ins	37	2.0
Total votes		1,876	100.0

Democratic election

Carroll 7 Democratic primary
Party	Candidate	Votes	%
Democratic	Bobbi Boudman	939	99.3
Republican	Glenn Cordelli (incumbent) (write-in)	2	0.2
Write-in	Misc. Write-ins	5	0.5
Total votes		946	100.0

General election

Carroll 7 general election, 2022
Party	Candidate	Votes	%
Republican	Glenn Cordelli (incumbent)	4,120	56.22
Democratic	Bobbi Boudman	3,203	43.71
Write-in	Write-ins	5	0.07
Total votes		7,328	100.0

=== Carroll 8 ===
- Elects two representatives

Republican primary

Carroll 8 Republican primary
Party	Candidate	Votes	%
Republican	Mark McConkey (incumbent)	2,302	59.3
Republican	Michael Costable Jr.	1,554	40.0
Write-in	Write-ins	25	0.6
Total votes		3,881	100.0

Democratic election

Carroll 8 Democratic primary
Party	Candidate	Votes	%
Democratic	Sandra Ringelstein	1,241	50.18
Democratic	Jerry Knirk (incumbent)	1,221	49.37
Republican	Mark McConkey (incumbent) (write-in)	4	0.16
Republican	Michael Costable Jr. (write-in)	4	0.16
Write-in	Misc. Write-ins	3	0.12
Total votes		2,473	100.0

General election

Carroll 8 general election, 2022
Party	Candidate	Votes	%
Republican	Mark McConkey (incumbent)	6,062	31.19
Republican	Michael Costable Jr.	4,785	24.62
Democratic	Jerry Knirk (incumbent)	4,298	22.11
Democratic	Sandra Ringelstein	4,287	22.06
Write-in	Write-ins	4	0.02
Total votes		19,436	100.0
