= Frank McCarthy (politician) =

American politician

Member of the New Hampshire House of Representatives from the 2nd Carroll district
- In office December 3, 2014 – December 5, 2018 Serving with Karen Umberger, Thomas Buco
- Preceded by: Syndi White
- Succeeded by: Harrison Kanzler; Stephen L. Woodcock

Personal details
- Party: Republican

Frank McCarthy is an American politician. He was a member of the New Hampshire House of Representatives from 2014 to 2018.

He was a candidate in the 2022 New Hampshire House of Representatives election. McCarthy was part of the Donald Trump 2024 presidential campaign in New Hampshire.
