= Lakes Region =

Lakes Region or Lake Region may refer to:

== Regions ==
- African Great Lakes region
- Finger Lakes Region, New York, United States
- Great Lakes region, North America
- Lakes Region (New Hampshire), United States
- Los Lagos Region, Chile
- Turkish Lakes Region, Anatolia, Turkey
- Uwharrie Lakes Region, North Carolina, United States
- Willandra Lakes Region, New South Wales, Australia

== Education ==
- Lake Region High School (disambiguation), multiple high schools
- Lake Region State College, a two-year public college in Devils Lake, North Dakota, United States
- Lake Region Union High School, a high school in Barton, Vermont, United States
- Lakes Region Community College, Laconia, New Hampshire, United States

== Other uses ==
- Lakes Region Facility, a former state prison in Laconia, New Hampshire, United States
- Lakes Region League, an athletics league in New Hampshire
- Lakes Region News Club, a private newspaper publishing company in New Hampshire
