= LGBTQ history in New Hampshire =

The American state of New Hampshire has been home to LGBTQ gathering places and communities since the mid-20th century. LGBTQ activism became more prominent in the state starting in the 1970s, and the state passed protections for LGBTQ residents beginning in the 1990s. The 21st century has seen LGBTQ residents be elected to statewide positions.

== 20th century ==
=== 1950s and 1960s ===
The 1950s saw the emergence of an LGBTQ community in Portsmouth. The city's first gay bar, the Seacoast Club, opened in 1957. A second LGBTQ-friendly venue, the Sagamore Social Club, opened that year; it remained open until 1978.

However, the LGBTQ community remained largely quiet, and many LGBTQ-friendly establishments were in out-of-the-way or secret locations.

=== 1970s ===
The 1970s saw a rise in LGBTQ activism in the state, particularly in the Seacoast Region.

In the early 1970s, students at the University of New Hampshire founded the Gay Student Organization. The university's student body president recognized the group in 1973. However, the group faced opposition from authorities, including then-Governor Meldrim Thomson, who told the university the group was not allowed to host social events, and UNH resciended their support. In spring 1974, student activists attempted to meet with Thomson via an auction, as New Hampshire Public Television was auctioning off a pancake breakfast with the governor to raise funds. The students were outbid, and were not given a chance to raise their bid before the item closed. Beginning in 1992, the GSU would commemorate this occasion with an annual LGBTQ+ and Ally Pancake Breakfast. The GSU instead took their case of discrimination to the state's supreme court, who ruled in GSU's favor in 1975.

In 1970, three openly gay men from New York City opened Blue Strawberry, a restaurant in Portsmouth that remained open until 1986. The Seaport Club opened in 1977, and continued to serve the community until its closure in 1995. In 1979, the social group Seacoast Gay Men was founded.

=== 1980s ===
The LGBTQ community in New Hampshire, as with the rest of the country, was heavily impacted by the HIV/AIDS crisis. AIDS Response Seacoast was working in the state by the late 1980s.

In October 1981, the NH Gay Symposium was held. In April 1982, New Hampshire police seized the mail list of the Gay Community News.

In 1984, a gay man from Portsmouth, Charlie Howard, was killed in a hate crime in Bangor, Maine. Two memorial benches were later installed in Portsmouth in his memory.

Iris, a "women's bar" in Portsmouth, was open during the 1980s.

=== 1990s ===
In the early 1990s, community organizers held a Gay Pride event at Pats Peak, a ski resort in Henniker.

In 1993, activists proposed an anti-discrimination ordinance in Portsmouth. The city's first Gay History Walk was held the following year.

In July 1996, LGBTQ people and their allies protested The Shirt Factory on Hampton Beach, after the business sold t-shirts with homophobic messages and graphics.

In April 1999, state legislators struck down a ban on gay and lesbian adults being able to foster or adopt.

== 21st century ==
In 2007, the New Hampshire legislature passed a bill legalizing civil unions in the state. This made New Hampshire the first state to legalize civil unions through legislation rather than court decisions. In 2010, same sex marriage was legalized in the state.

The first Pride event in Portsmouth was held on June 27, 2015, the day after the U.S. Supreme Court ruled in Obergefell v. Hodges that same-sex couples had a right to marry. That same year, New Hampshire resident Tom Kaufhold founded the NH Seacoast LGBT History Project.

In 2018, Chris Pappas was elected to the U.S. House of Representatives, becoming the state's first openly LGBTQ congressperson. That same year, Gerri Cannon and Lisa Bunker became the first openly transgender women to be elected to the New Hampshire House of Representatives.

In 2022, James Rosener became the first openly trans man to be elected to the New Hampshire legislature; he has served in the House of Representatives since January 2023.
