= Lori Korzen =

Lori E. Korzen (née Abbott; born February, 1971) is a member of the New Hampshire House of Representatives, serving since 2024.

== Biography ==
She was born as Lori E. Abbott in February, 1971. She is a foster parent, a mother of two children and a grandmother. She married Steven Korzen on September 6, 1997.

Korzen has worked as an advanced emergency medical technician and as a wilderness emergency medical technician. She is a small business owner. She has been involved with various dog rescue organizations, and has trained therapy dogs.

In 2022, Korzen ran for the New Hampshire House of Representatives in Coös County District 5, as a Republican. She faced Democrats Corinne Cascadden and Henry Noel, as well as Republican Gaston Gingues. Korzen came in third place with 1,361 votes, behind Noel and Cascadden.

In 2024, Korzen ran for the New Hampshire House of Representatives again, this time in Coös County District 7 as a Republican, against incumbent Democrat Eamon Kelley, who had been serving since 2022. Korzen won the race, receiving 3,421 votes to Kelley's 3,039 votes, or 53% to 47%.

Korzen was sworn in on December 4, 2024. As of 2025, she lives in Berlin, New Hampshire.

On February 20, 2025, Korzen voted ITL on NH HB56, which mandates that all firearm transfers in New Hampshire go through a licensed firearms dealer, ensuring background checks and record-keeping to prevent prohibited individuals from obtaining firearms.
