= Pete Morency =

American politician

Peter Morency is an American politician serving as a Republican member of the New Hampshire House of Representatives from Coös County District 5 since 2024.

== Biography ==
Morency was elected to the New Hampshire House of Representatives from Coös County District 5 on November 5, 2024. He was running against Republican Brian Valerino, and Democrats Corinne Cascadden and Henry Noel. Morency came in second place receiving 1,932 votes. Valerino came in first place, meaning that Morency and Valerino won the election. Cascadden and Noel lost.

Morency was sworn in on December 4, 2024. His current term ends on December 2, 2026.

On February 20, 2025, Morency voted yes on NH HB56, which mandates that all firearm transfers in New Hampshire go through a licensed firearms dealer, ensuring background checks and record-keeping to prevent prohibited individuals from obtaining firearms.
