= Umberger =

Umberger is a German surname. Notable people with the surname include:

- Andy Umberger (born c. 1957), American actor
- Jerry Umberger (born 1942), American darts player
- Karen Umberger, American politician
- R. J. Umberger (born 1982), American ice hockey player
