= Gerri Cannon =

American politician

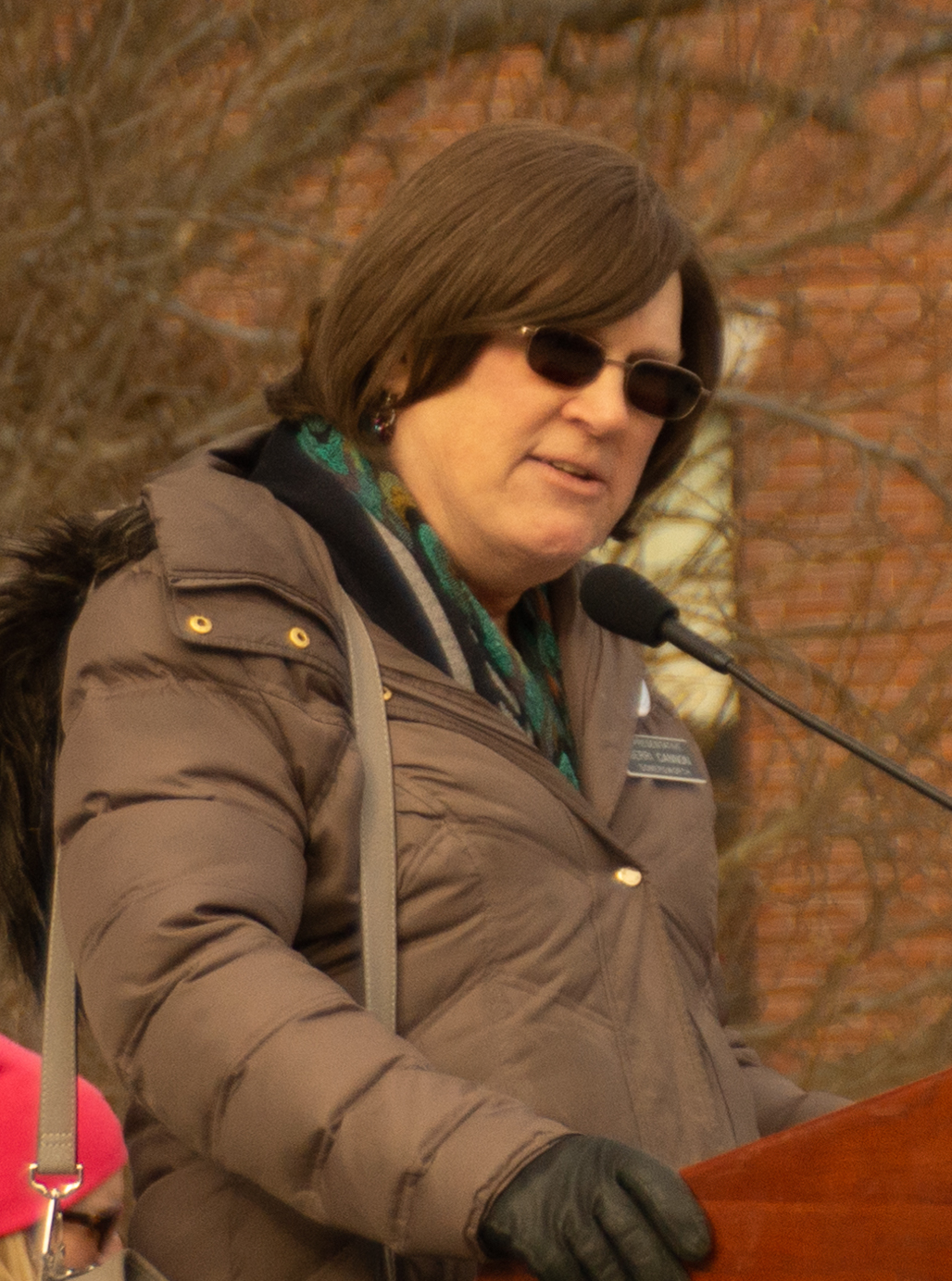
- Cannon at the 2019 Women's March in Concord

Member of the New Hampshire House of Representatives
- In office December 7, 2022 – December 4, 2024 Serving with Kenneth Vincent, Cecilia Rich, Jeffrey Rich
- Preceded by: Mac Kittredge
- Succeeded by: Billie Butler (elected)
- Constituency: Strafford 12th
- In office December 5, 2018 – December 7, 2022 Serving with Wendy Chase, Cecilia Rich
- Preceded by: Roger Berube
- Succeeded by: Michael Harrington
- Constituency: Strafford 18th

Personal details
- Party: Democratic

Gerri Cannon is an American politician, who was elected in 2018 to the New Hampshire House of Representatives. She represented the Strafford 18th District as a member of the Democratic Party. She was previously (in 2017) elected to the Somersworth, New Hampshire School Board.

Cannon is transgender, and she and Lisa Bunker were elected alongside each other as the state's first openly transgender state legislators.

== Electoral history ==
=== 2018 ===
New Hampshire House of Representatives Strafford 18th district Democratic primary, 2018
Party	Candidate	Votes	%
Democratic	Wendy Chase	774	31.73
Democratic	Gerri Cannon	605	24.81
Democratic	Cecilia Rich	549	22.51
Democratic	Roger Berube (incumbent)	511	20.95
Total votes		2,439	100.0

New Hampshire House of Representatives Strafford 18th district general election, 2018
Party	Candidate	Votes	%
Democratic	Wendy Chase	2,215	19.12
Democratic	Gerri Cannon	2,055	17.74
Democratic	Cecilia Rich	1,923	16.60
Republican	Matthew Spencer (incumbent)	1,727	14.90
Republican	Jodi Carnes	1,538	13.27
Republican	Padraic O'Hare	1,378	11.89
Independent	Dale Sprague (incumbent)	601	5.19
Libertarian	Jarec Rondeau	147	1.27
Total votes		11,584	100.0

=== 2020 ===
New Hampshire House of Representatives Strafford 18th district Democratic primary, 2020
Party	Candidate	Votes	%
Democratic	Wendy Chase (incumbent)	1,092	35.31
Democratic	Gerri Cannon (incumbent)	1,009	32.62
Democratic	Cecilia Rich (incumbent)	988	31.94
Democratic	Write-ins	4	0.13
Total votes		3,093	100.0

New Hampshire House of Representatives Strafford 18th district general election, 2020
Party	Candidate	Votes	%
Democratic	Wendy Chase (incumbent)	3,260	19.51
Democratic	Gerri Cannon (incumbent)	3,042	18.20
Democratic	Cecilia Rich (incumbent)	2,959	17.71
Republican	Matthew Spencer	2,670	15.98
Republican	Steven Douglas McMahon	2,387	14.28
Republican	Jodi Lavoie-Carnesa	2,382	14.25
Write-in	Write-ins	10	0.06
Total votes		16,710	100.0

=== 2022 ===
New Hampshire House of Representatives Strafford 12th district Democratic primary, 2022
Party	Candidate	Votes	%
Democratic	Kenneth Vincent (incumbent)	628	25.86
Democratic	Gerri Cannon (incumbent)	627	25.82
Democratic	Cecilia Rich (incumbent)	612	25.21
Democratic	Jeffrey Rich	561	10.75
Total votes		2,428	100.0

New Hampshire House of Representatives Strafford 12th district general election, 2022
Party	Candidate	Votes	%
Democratic	Kenneth Vincent (incumbent)	3,153	14.76
Democratic	Gerri Cannon (incumbent)	3,095	14.49
Democratic	Cecilia Rich (incumbent)	3,043	14.24
Democratic	Jeffrey Rich	2,860	13.39
Republican	Ken Hilton	2,470	11.56
Republican	Matthew Spencer	2,309	10.81
Republican	Nick Boyle	2,245	10.51
Republican	Steven Douglas McMahon	2,190	10.25
Total votes		21,365	100.0

== See also ==
- List of transgender public officeholders in the United States
