= Eamon Kelly =

Eamon Kelly may refer to:

- Eamon M. Kelly (1936–2017), president of Tulane University, 1981–1998
- Eamon Kelly (criminal) (died 2012), Irish drug trafficker and crime leader
- Eamon Kelly (actor) (1914–2001), Irish actor and author
- Eamonn P. Kelly, Irish archaeologist
- Éamonn Kelly (born 1968), Irish hurler

== See also ==
- Eamon Kelley, member of the New Hampshire House of Representatives
