= Bobbi Boudman =

American politician

Member of the New Hampshire House of Representatives from the Carroll 7th district
- Incumbent
- Assumed office March 25, 2026
- Preceded by: Glenn Cordelli
- Succeeded by: Dale Fincher (elect)

Personal details
- Party: Democratic
- Spouse: Christian
- Children: 1
- Website: Campaign website

Roberta "Bobbi" Boudman is an American politician who is a member of the New Hampshire House of Representatives for the Carroll 7th district. As a Democrat, she flipped the seat in a March 2026 special election following incumbent Republican Glenn Cordelli's resignation.

== Political career ==
In March 2019, Boudman supported John Hickenlooper in the 2020 Democratic presidential primaries.

In 2022, Boudman first ran for the New Hampshire House of Representatives for Carroll's 7th district against Republican incumbent Glenn Cordelli. She lost to him with 43.71% of the vote in the general election.

In 2024, Boudman again challenged Cordelli. She lost to him again, earning 43.1% of the vote in the general election.

Boudman spoke at a May 2025 meeting of the Carroll County commission against the sheriff and jail collaborating with U.S. Immigration and Customs Enforcement.

Boudman announced that she would run in the March 10, 2026 special election caused by Cordelli's resignation after he moved out of state. The New Hampshire Republican State Committee sent out a mailer featured an AI-generated image of Boudman driving two tattooed Hispanic men with the text “If elected, Bobbi Boudman’s policies would drive illegal aliens into New Hampshire,” and she filed a complaint with the Attorney General of New Hampshire over a spoof website sponsored by the Committee to Elect House Republicans. Boudman and Republican nominee Dale Fincher notably disagreed on New Hampshire Education Freedom Accounts, with Boudman opposing and Fincher supporting the school voucher program. In an upset, she narrowly flipped the seat against Fincher with 51% of the vote. According to the Democratic Legislative Campaign Committee, which supported Boudman, nationwide this was the 28th state legislative seat flipped from Republicans to Democrats since Donald Trump won the 2024 presidential election. She was sworn in on March 25, 2026.

== Personal life ==
Boudman and her husband, visual effects artist Christian Boudman, have resided in Wolfeboro, New Hampshire, since 2008. They have a son.
