= Frank McCarthy =

Frank McCarthy may refer to:

- Frank McCarthy (producer) (1912–1986), secretary of the General Staff of the United States Department of War during World War II
- Frank McCarthy (artist) (1924–2002), American artist and realist painter
- Frank McCarthy (actor) (born 1942), American actor
- Frank McCarthy (politician), New Hampshire state legislator
