= Scruton (surname) =

Scruton is a surname, and may refer to:

- Gordon Scruton (born 1947), American bishop
- Howard Scruton (born 1962), Canadian ice hockey player
- Joan Scruton (1918–2007), English sports organizer
- Matthew Scruton, American politician
- Nick Scruton (born 1984), English rugby league player
- Roger Scruton (1944–2020), English philosopher
