= Sam Farrington =

American politician (born 2004)

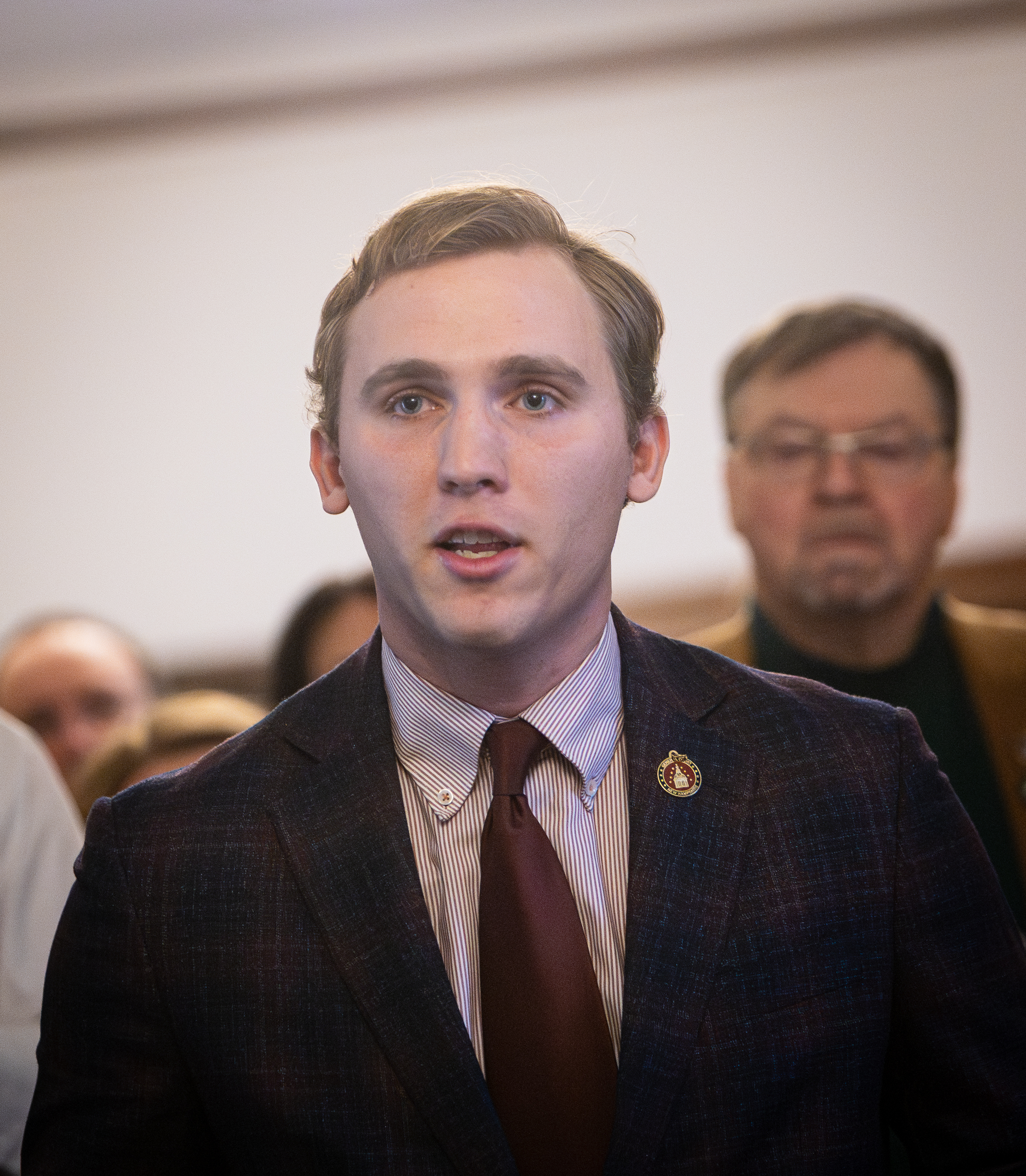
- Farrington in 2025

Member of the New Hampshire House of Representatives from the Strafford 8th district
- Incumbent
- Assumed office December 4, 2024
- Preceded by: Chuck Grassie
- Succeeded by: Ty Wyman (elect)

Personal details
- Born: October 26, 2003 (age 23) Rochester, New Hampshire, U.S.
- Party: Republican
- Education: University of New Hampshire (BS)
- Website: Campaign website

Samuel G. Farrington (born October 26, 2003) is an American politician. He is a member of the New Hampshire House of Representatives and is a member of the Republican Party.

== Early life and education ==
Samuel Farrington was born on October 26, 2003, in Rochester, New Hampshire, as the son of Therese Gilbert and Tim Farrington, a science teacher at Rochester Middle School. Farrington attended public schools in the Rochester School District and graduated from Spaulding High School in 2022. He was one of the top ten students of his class at Spaulding High School. He played varsity baseball and golf in high school. In the summer, he worked on Fowler's Farm baling and stacking hay. Farrington attended the University of New Hampshire and graduated with a Bachelor of Science in analytical economics in 2026. At the University of New Hampshire, he was one of a few dozen counter-protesters at a student and faculty walkout protesting the clearing of a pro-Palestinian encampment that called on the university to divest from Israel.

== Career ==
Farrington ran for election as a candidate for the Strafford 8th district of the New Hampshire House of Representatives in 2024. He advocated for New Hampshire's school voucher program known as Education Freedom Accounts and said he would defend New Hampshire's current laws regarding abortion. He defeated the incumbent Chuck Grassie in the 2024 New Hampshire House of Representatives election.

When he was first elected in 2024, Farrington became one of the few members of Generation Z serving in the New Hampshire House of Representatives alongside Valerie McDonnell.

He is a member of the New Hampshire House Committee on finance. Farrington advocated for the end of the state mandated car inspections in New Hampshire.

After the assassination of Charlie Kirk, Farrington organized a vigil at the University of New Hampshire for the late political activist. Farrington was accused of doxing after he posted on Twitter asking for a person to be identified that was seen on camera taking down flyers for a vigil for Charlie Kirk in a Durham, New Hampshire, apartment building.

Farrington is the prime sponsor of House Bill 1793 which is intended to prevent colleges and universities in New Hampshire from suppressing gun rights on campuses. The bill was passed by the New Hampshire House of Representatives in a vote of 188 to 165 on February 5, 2026.

Farrington lost his bid for re-election to the NH State House of Representatives on Nov. 3, 2026. His district Strafford 19 had three open State House seats. He came in fourth behind three Democrats.
