= Adam Heard =

American politician

Member-elect of the New Hampshire House of Representatives from the Carroll 2nd district
- Assuming office December 2026
- Succeeding: Chris McAleer

Personal details
- Party: Democratic

Adam Heard is an American politician. A member of the Democratic Party, he is the member-elect for the Carroll 2nd district of the New Hampshire House of Representatives.
