= Brian Valerino =

American politician

Warden of Northern New Hampshire Correctional Facility
- Incumbent
- Assumed office June 19, 2025
- Appointed by: Kelly Ayotte

Member of the New Hampshire House of Representatives from the Coos 5th district
- In office December 4, 2024 – June 19, 2025 Serving with Pete Morency
- Preceded by: Corinne Cascadden; Henry Noel

Sheriff of Coos County, New Hampshire
- In office 2016–2024
- Preceded by: Gerald Marcou
- Succeeded by: Keith L. Roberge

Personal details
- Party: Republican

Brian Valerino is an American politician. A member of the Republican Party, he served in the New Hampshire House of Representatives from December 4, 2024, until his resignation on June 19, 2025. He previously served as sheriff of Coos County, New Hampshire from 2016 to 2024.

He resigned from the New Hampshire House because he was appointed by Governor Kelly Ayotte to be Warden of the Northern New Hampshire Correctional Facility in Berlin, New Hampshire.
