= Northern New Hampshire Correctional Facility =

Prison in New Hampshire, United States

- Location in New Hampshire
- Location: Berlin, New Hampshire; 44°30′45″N 71°08′44″W
- Status: Operational
- Security class: Medium
- Capacity: 665
- Opened: 2000
- Managed by: New Hampshire Department of Corrections
- Warden: Brian Valerino

The Northern New Hampshire Correctional Facility (NNHCF) is a state prison in Berlin, New Hampshire, United States. It is a part of the New Hampshire Department of Corrections.

It is 120 miles (190 km) north of the state capital at Concord. NNHCF contains only medium security male prisoners and has a maximum capacity of 635 prisoners. In May 2009 this prison was modified to hold a total of over 740 inmates, due to the closing of the Lakes Region Facility in Laconia.

It employs approximately 200 people, including correctional officers, medical staff, and administration officials. The Warden is Brian Valerino.
