= Dale Fincher =

American politician

Member-elect of the New Hampshire House of Representatives from the Carroll 7th district
- Assuming office December 2026
- Succeeding: Bobbi Boudman

Personal details
- Party: Republican

Dale Fincher is an American politician. A member of the Republican Party, he is the member-elect for the Carroll 7th district of the New Hampshire House of Representatives.
