= Billie Butler =

American politician

Member of the New Hampshire House of Representatives from the Strafford 12th district
- Incumbent
- Assumed office August 13, 2025
- Preceded by: Gerri Cannon; Dawn Evans (elect)

Personal details
- Party: Democratic
- Website: Campaign website

Billie Butler is an American politician who is member of the New Hampshire House of Representatives from Strafford County District 12, representing the towns of Somersworth and Rollinsford. A Democrat, she won a June 2025 special election to the chamber to succeed Democratic member-elect Dawn Evans, who moved out of her district after winning in the 2024 general election.

== Early life ==
Butler grew up in new Hampshire between the cities of Milton and Portsmouth.

== Career ==
Butler is active in the theatre community in the seacoast region.

== Personal life ==
Butler is a transgender woman.
