= Ty Wyman =

American politician

Member-elect of the New Hampshire House of Representatives from the Strafford 8th district
- Assuming office December 2026
- Succeeding: Sam Farrington

Personal details
- Party: Democratic

Ty Wyman is an American politician. A member of the Democratic Party, he is the member-elect for the Strafford 8th district of the New Hampshire House of Representatives.
