= Marc Tremblay (politician) =

American politician

Member of the New Hampshire House of Representatives from the Coos 5th district
- Incumbent
- Assumed office December 3, 2025
- Succeeded by: Mark Evans (elect)

Member of the New Hampshire House of Representatives from the Coos 4th district
- In office December 1, 2010 – December 5, 2012 Serving with Gary Coulombe, Robert Theberge, Yvonne Thomas

Personal details
- Party: Republican

Marc Tremblay is an American politician from the state of New Hampshire. A member of the Republican Party, he served in the New Hampshire House of Representatives from 2010 to 2012. In November 2025, he was elected to a new term in a special election to succeed Brian Valerino.
