= Mac Kittredge =

American politician

Member of New Hampshire House of Representatives for Strafford 12
- In office December 5, 2018 – December 7, 2022
- Preceded by: Matthew Scruton
- Succeeded by: Gerri Cannon

Personal details
- Party: Republican

Derek MacMillen "Mac" Kittredge is an American politician. He was a member of the New Hampshire House of Representatives from 2018 to 2022.

Kittredge was part of the Donald Trump 2024 presidential campaign in New Hampshire.
