= Benjamin Colbath =

American politician

Member-elect of the New Hampshire House of Representatives from the Carroll 1st district
- Assuming office December 2026
- Succeeding: Stephen Woodcock

Personal details
- Party: Democratic

Benjamin Colbath is an American politician. A member of the Democratic Party, he is the member-elect for the Carroll 1st district of the New Hampshire House of Representatives.
