= Ellin Leonard =

American politician

Member-elect of the New Hampshire House of Representatives from the Carroll 1st district
- Assuming office December 2026
- Succeeding: Thomas Buco

Personal details
- Party: Democratic

Ellin Leonard is an American politician. A member of the Democratic Party, she is the member-elect for the Carroll 1st district of the New Hampshire House of Representatives.
