= Thomas Buco =

American politician

Member of the New Hampshire House of Representatives from the Carroll 1st district
- In office December 1, 2004 – December 1, 2010
- Incumbent
- Assumed office December 7, 2022
- Succeeded by: Ellin Leonard (elect)

Member of the New Hampshire House of Representatives from the Carroll 2nd district
- In office December 5, 2012 – December 7, 2022

Personal details
- Party: Democratic

Thomas Buco is an American politician. He serves as a Democratic member for the Carroll 1st district of the New Hampshire House of Representatives.
