= Harrison Kanzler =

American politician

Member of the New Hampshire House of Representatives from the Carroll 2nd district
- In office December 5, 2018 – December 2020
- Preceded by: Karen Umberger
- Succeeded by: Karen Umberger

Personal details
- Party: Democratic

Harrison Kanzler is a New Hampshire politician.

== Career ==
On November 6, 2018, Kanzler was elected to the New Hampshire House of Representatives where he represents the Carroll 2 district. Kanzler assumed office on December 5, 2018. Kanzler is a Democrat.

== Personal life ==
Kanzler resides in North Conway, New Hampshire. Kanzler is married and has one child.
