= Matthew Scruton =

American politician

Member of the New Hampshire House of Representatives
- In office 2016–2018
- Succeeded by: Mac Kittredge
- Constituency: Strafford 12

Personal details
- Party: Republican
- Education: University of New Hampshire

Matthew G. Scruton is an American politician from New Hampshire. He served in the New Hampshire House of Representatives.

Scruton has a master's degree in business administration and a bachelor's degree in business from the University of New Hampshire. In 2017 he was a candidate for mayor of Rochester, New Hampshire.
