= Lisa Bunker =

American politician

- Writing career
- Period: 2017–present
- Genre: LGBT
- Website: www.lisabunker.net

Member of the New Hampshire House of Representatives from the Rockingham 18th district
- In office December 5, 2018 – September 11, 2022
- Preceded by: Paula Francese

Personal details
- Party: Democratic
- Website: https://lisa4exeter.com/

Lisa Bunker is an American author and politician who was a member of the New Hampshire House of Representatives from 2018 to 2022. They represented the Rockingham 18th District as a member of the Democratic Party.

== Early life ==
Bunker grew up in Southern California.

== Career ==
In 2018, Bunker and Gerri Cannon were elected simultaneously as New Hampshire's first transgender state legislators.

Before their election to the legislature, Bunker was program director of a community radio station in Portland, Maine. In 2017, they published a middle-grade science fiction novel, Felix Yz, about a boy fused with an alien and the risky procedure to separate them. Their second middle-grade novel, Zenobia July (2019), is about a young trans girl finally living as herself and solving a cyber mystery. Both are published by Penguin Random House.

In 2022, Bunker left office and moved to Sacramento with their wife.

== See also ==
- List of transgender public officeholders in the United States
