= Lake Region High School =

Lake Region High School can refer to

- Lake Region High School (Florida)
- Lake Region High School (Maine)
- Lake Region Union High School (Vermont)
