= Roger Berube =

American politician

Member of the New Hampshire House of Representatives from the Strafford 18 district
- In office 1994–2018

Personal details
- Born: July 25, 1938 (age 88) Rochester, New Hampshire
- Party: Democratic
- Spouse: Ellen
- Children: 3
- Education: Rhode Island College

Roger R Berube (born July 25, 1938) is an American politician in the state of New Hampshire. He was a member of the New Hampshire House of Representatives, sitting as a Democrat from the Strafford 18 district, having been first elected in 1994.

== Boards ==
Berube served on the Metro Planning Organization, the New Hampshire Canadian Trade Council, the Skyhaven Airport Operating Commission, the Somersworth City Council and the Somersworth School Board.

He was defeated in September 2018 primaries.

In 2021 his son died of brain cancer.
