= Dave's Redistricting =

Web application

- Home page for Dave's Redistricting on October 11, 2024
- Company type: LLC
- Creator: Dave Bradlee
- Editors: Dave Bradlee; Terry Crowley; Alec Ramsay; David Rinn
- Website: davesredistricting.org
- Current status: Active

Dave's Redistricting App (DRA) is an online web app originally created by Dave Bradlee that allows users to simulate redistricting a U.S. state's congressional and legislative districts.

== Purpose ==
According to Bradlee, the software was designed to "put power in people's hands," and so that they "can see how the process works, so it's a little less mysterious than it was 10 years ago." Bradlee has noticed that many citizens are taking this process seriously and using his app to create legitimate redistricting maps that could be put in place. Some websites have called Bradlee the pioneer and cause of the rise of do-it-yourself redistricting. States such as Montana in 2021 allowed the general population to use it to submit redistricting proposals following the 2020 United States Census.

Dave's Redistricting has frequently been mentioned as a resource that can be used to combat gerrymandering, given that the public has free access to it.

Political science firms such as FiveThirtyEight have used the website to draw examples of gerrymandered districts, including on their famous Atlas of Redistricting.

== Functions ==
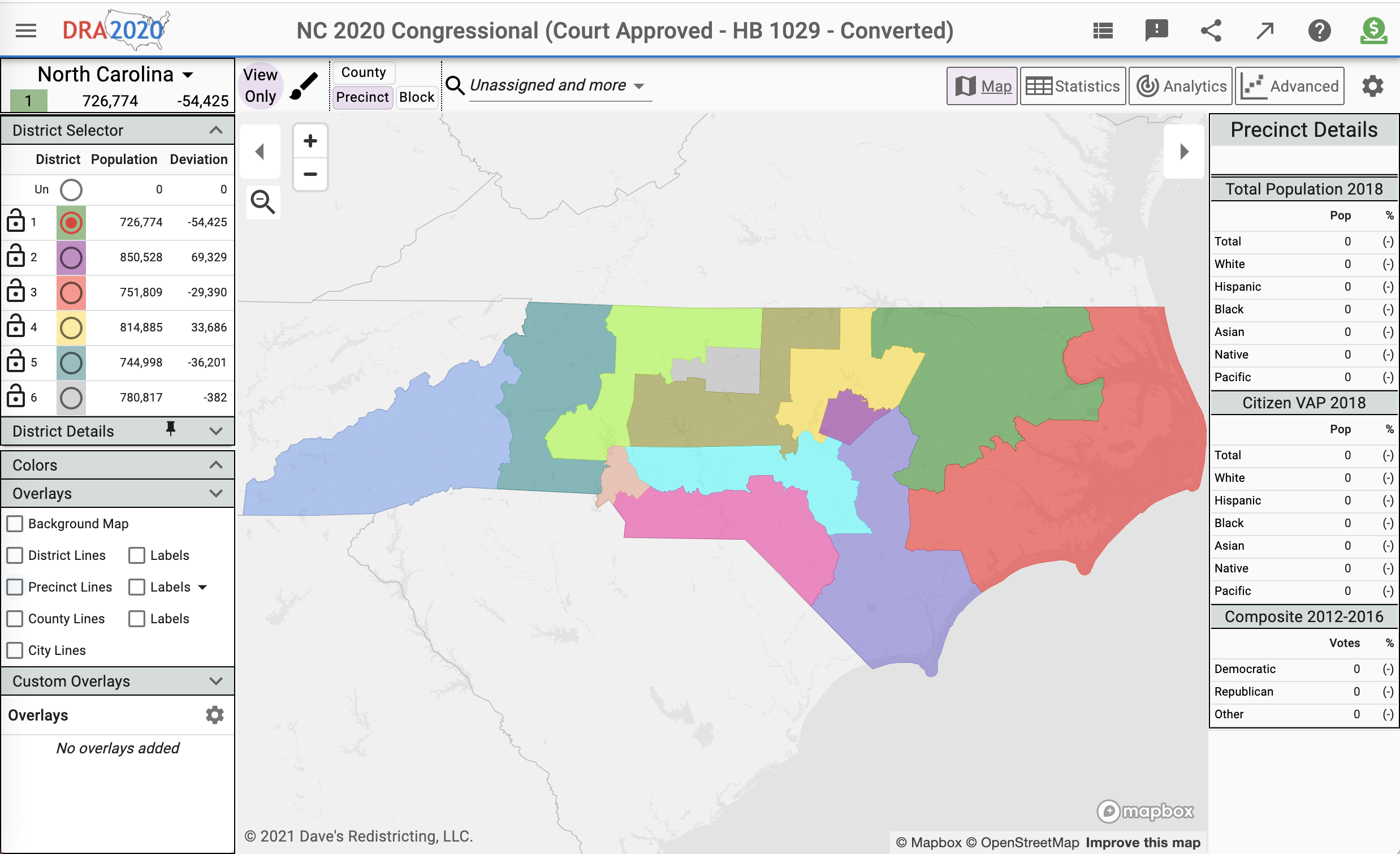
North Carolina 2020 congressional district in Dave's Redistricting 2020

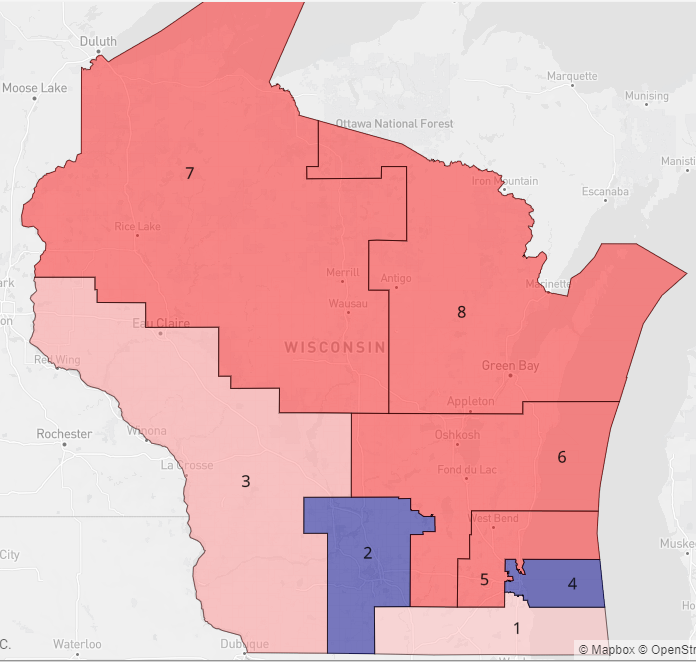
Wisconsin alternative congressional districts drawn with Dave's Redistricting 2020

Users can redraw the congressional and state legislative districts for all 50 states, the District of Columbia, and Puerto Rico using a variety of census and election datasets including Cook PVI. Maps can be optimized for different criteria.

DRA 2020 added several major features to the first generation app:

- Sharing & collaborative editing of maps, like Google Docs
- Multiple statewide elections for all 50 states including the ability to import your own data
- Comprehensive analytics for evaluating and comparing maps
- Custom overlays, and
- Block-level editing

DRA remains free to use.

== Versions ==
- 2.2: This uses Bing Maps, an outdated software that projects the districts of a single state onto a map of the United States.
- 2.5: After Bing Maps announced that it would no longer be updating for the foreseen future, the U.S. Map feature was removed.
- DRA 2020: At the end of 2018, a beta version of 2020 was released. This version that did not require Microsoft Silverlight and could be used in any web browser. DRA 2020 has been under continuous development since and is built using React (JavaScript library), Mapbox, OpenStreetMap, TypeScript, Node.js, Amazon Web Services, as well as many open source components, tools, and icons.
