= Eamon Kelley =

American politician

Member of the New Hampshire House of Representatives from the Coos 3rd district
- In office 2020 – December 7, 2022

Member of the New Hampshire House of Representatives from the Coos 7th district
- In office December 7, 2022 – December 4, 2024
- Succeeded by: Lori Korzen

Personal details
- Party: Democratic

Eamon Kelley is an American politician. He served as a Democratic member for the Coos 3rd and 7th district of the New Hampshire House of Representatives from 2020 to 2024.
