= Chris McAleer =

American politician

Member of the New Hampshire House of Representatives from the Carroll 2nd district
- Incumbent
- Assumed office December 7, 2022
- Succeeded by: Adam Heard (elect)

Member of the New Hampshire House of Representatives from the Carroll 7th district
- In office December 2, 2020 – December 7, 2022

Personal details
- Party: Democratic

Chris McAleer is an American politician. He serves as a Democratic member for the Carroll 2nd district of the New Hampshire House of Representatives.
