= Wendy Chase =

American politician

Member of the New Hampshire House of Representatives from the Strafford 18th district
- Incumbent
- Assumed office December 5, 2018

Personal details
- Party: Democratic
- Education: Northeastern University

Wendy Chase is a New Hampshire politician.

== Education ==
Chase attended Northeastern University.

== Career ==
On November 6, 2018, Chase was elected to the New Hampshire House of Representatives where she represents the Strafford 18 district. Chase assumed office on December 5, 2018. Chase is a Democrat. Chase endorses Bernie Sanders in the 2020 Democratic Party presidential primaries.

== Personal life ==
Chase resides in Rollinsford, New Hampshire. Chase is married and has two children.
