= Glenn Cordelli =

American politician

The Honorable Glenn Cordelli

Member of the New Hampshire House of Representatives from the Carroll 7th district
- In office December 7, 2022 – November 12, 2025
- Preceded by: Chris McAleer
- Succeeded by: Bobbi Boudman

Member of the New Hampshire House of Representatives from the Carroll 4th district
- In office December 5, 2012 – December 7, 2022
- Preceded by: David Knox; Betsey Patten; Chris Ahlgren; Steve Schmidt
- Succeeded by: Lino M. Avellani; Mike Belcher

Personal details
- Party: Republican
- Website: Official website

Glenn Cordelli is an American politician. He served as a Republican member for the Carroll 7th district of the New Hampshire House of Representatives. He previously served as the vice chair of the Education Committee. He served as the Chair of the Education Policy and Administration Committee.

== Personal life ==
Cordelli resides in Tuftonboro, New Hampshire. He is married and has three children.

== Political career ==
Cordelli was first elected to the New Hampshire House of Representatives in 2012 as a Republican for Carroll's 4th district. Cordelli now serves for Carroll's 7th district after the 2020 redistricting. Cordelli served as the Vice Chair of the Education Committee from 2020 to 2024. He currently serves as the Chair of the Education Policy and Administration Committee.

In 2024 and 2025 Cordelli was the primary sponsor of House bills written to ban what he described as "obscene or harmful" material from school libraries.

Cordelli resigned from the New Hampshire House in November 2025 after moving out of state.
