= Stephen Woodcock (politician) =

American politician

Steve Woodcock
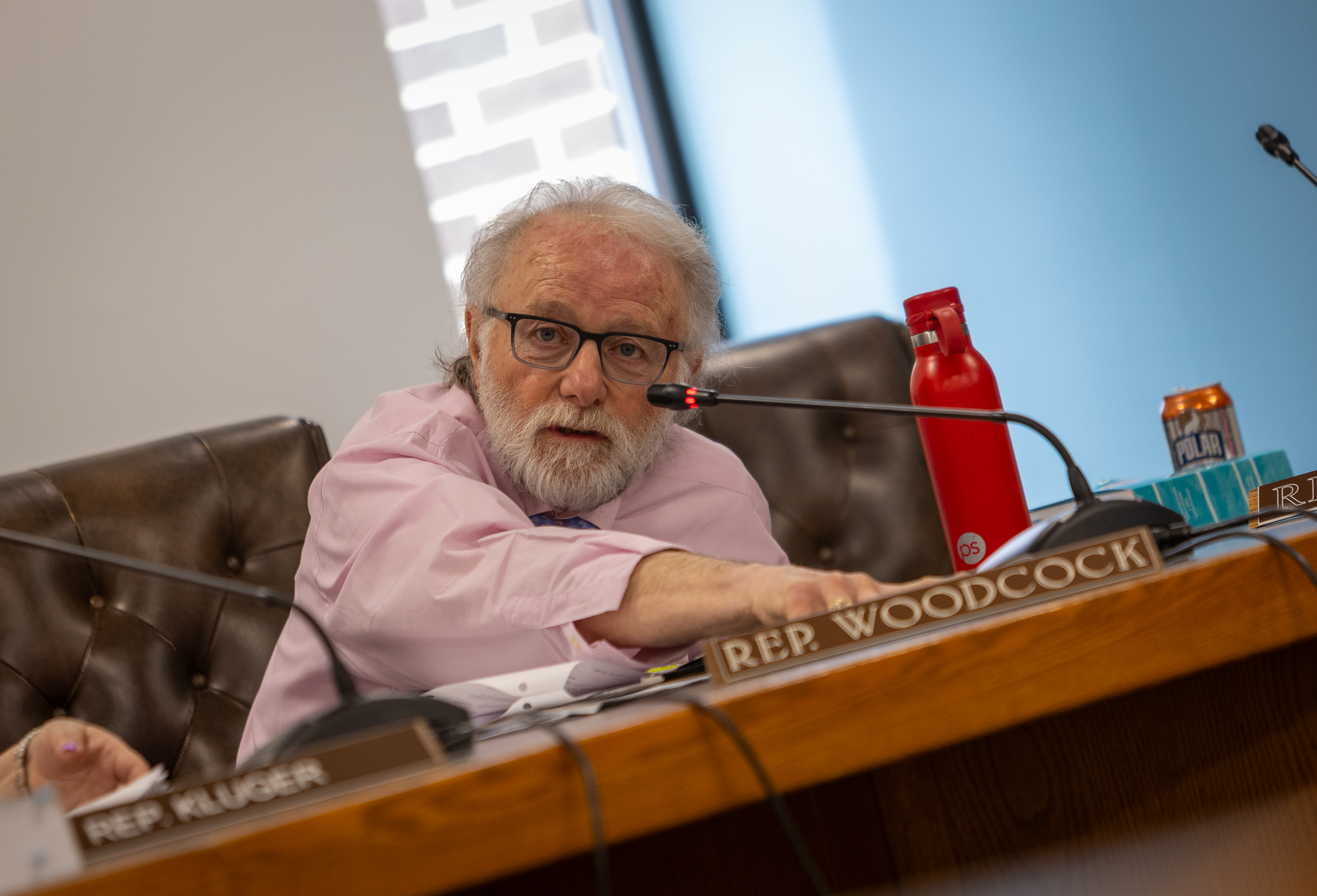
- Woodcock in 2026

Member of the New Hampshire House of Representatives from the Carroll 2nd district
- Incumbent
- Assumed office December 5, 2018
- Succeeded by: Benjamin Colbath (elect)

Personal details
- Party: Democratic

Stephen L. Woodcock is a New Hampshire politician.

== Career ==
On November 6, 2018, Woodcock was elected to the New Hampshire House of Representatives where he represents the Carroll 2 district. Woodcock assumed office on December 5, 2018. Woodcock is a Democrat.

== Personal life ==
Woodcock resides in Center Conway, New Hampshire. Woodcock is married and has one child.
