= New Hampshire Education Freedom Accounts =

New Hampshire Education Freedom Accounts (EFAs) are a state-funded education program that allows eligible families to use public education funds for approved educational expenses outside of traditional public schools. The program was established in 2021 and expanded in 2023, making most New Hampshire students eligible to participate. EFA funds can be used for private school tuition, homeschooling expenses, tutoring, instructional materials, and other approved educational costs, including equestrian camps, martial arts training and other non-educational experiences.

The program has grown rapidly, with participation and total spending exceeding early projections. Current projections are estimated to exceed $100 million in 2026. Supporters argue that EFAs provide families with greater flexibility and choice in education, while critics have raised concerns about the program’s financial impact on public schools, oversight of spending, and the use of public funds for private and religious education.

== Background ==
New Hampshire created the EFA program in 2021 as part of broader school choice legislation. The program was designed to allow eligible families to direct a portion of state education funding toward alternative education options, including private schools, homeschooling, and specialized educational services.

In 2023, lawmakers expanded eligibility requirements, allowing most students in the state to apply regardless of income level.

== Program overview ==
EFA-approved families receive state education funds in their individual accounts, which they can use for approved educational expenses. These include private school tuition, homeschooling materials, tutoring, educational technology, instructional services, and certain extracurricular activities.

EFAs in New Hampshire are administered by an external scholarship organization responsible for processing applications and reporting on spending. Concerns have been raised about the availability of detailed spending data after reports published by the administrator, which showed how public funds were allocated, were removed from public view due to fears of harassment against education providers. Reporting from the Concord Monitor noted that the removed documents included detailed expenditure lists that showed how millions of dollars were spent on instructional and extracurricular categories and that program rules permit a broad range of uses for EFA funds, leading to public discussion about oversight and accountability.

== Eligibility and funding ==
Initially, New Hampshire’s EFA program had eligibility limited by an income cap, which restricted participation to families whose income did not exceed a set percentage of the federal poverty level. In 2025, the Legislature passed and the governor signed legislation that removed the income eligibility cap, making the program available to nearly all New Hampshire students regardless of household income, subject to an overall enrollment limit.

The program’s funding comes from the state’s education formula, drawing on the Education Trust Fund and other state tax revenues that support public education. After the expansion of eligibility, the number of EFA participants nearly doubled, and state spending on EFAs increased accordingly. While opponents have raised concerns about cost and its implications for public education finance, reports noted that the EFA program’s growth has not directly decreased the state’s adequacy aid to local school districts, as per legislative oversight committee findings.

== Growth and participation ==
Since its expansion, EFA participation has increased significantly. Enrollment and total spending have exceeded early projections, with state officials estimating that EFA costs could surpass $51.6 million annually by the 2025–26 fiscal year.

State data analyses have shown that most students using EFAs were not previously enrolled in public schools, meaning the program has largely added new education costs rather than replacing existing public school funding.

== Impact on education ==
News coverage has reported that the expansion of New Hampshire’s EFA program has redirected state education funding toward private and alternative education options, while raising concerns among some lawmakers and education advocates about transparency, oversight, and long-term budget implications. Reporting by New Hampshire Public Radio noted that the legislative oversight committee responsible for reviewing the program had not met for an extended period, prompting calls from Democratic lawmakers for greater scrutiny of how EFA funds are used and how the program affects the state’s education budget.

Studies have also revealed that private and religious schools have received a significant portion of EFA tuition funds. A Concord Monitor review of EFA spending data found that religiously affiliated schools received a substantial share of EFA tuition payments, highlighting how public education dollars have been directed to private institutions under the program.

== Political debate ==
Supporters of EFAs have described the program as a means of expanding educational choice and flexibility for families. Republican lawmakers and advocates have argued that the program allows parents to select educational environments that they believe better meet their children’s needs and that increased participation demonstrates public demand for school choice options.

Critics of the program have raised concerns about oversight, transparency, and fiscal impacts. Some Democratic lawmakers have argued that legislative oversight of the program has faltered and pushed for greater transparency regarding how funds are used, and others have expressed concern that the rapid expansion of the program’s enrollment warrants increased scrutiny of its effects on state education funding and public schools.

== Oversight and accountability ==
The EFA program has drawn scrutiny over how public funds are spent and monitored. Reporting by New Hampshire Public Radio documented that families have been permitted to use EFA funds for a wide range of approved expenses, including private school tuition, instructional materials, tutoring, and certain extracurricular activities, prompting debate over the breadth of allowable uses and the level of oversight applied to the program.

Oversight of the program has also been a subject of legislative concern. New Hampshire Public Radio reported that the House oversight committee responsible for monitoring the EFA program had not met for more than a year following the program’s expansion, leading some lawmakers to call for increased scrutiny and clearer reporting on spending and outcomes.

In addition, the Concord Monitor reported that detailed EFA spending documents were removed from public access after concerns were raised about harassment of education providers, a move that renewed discussion about transparency and accountability in the administration of the program.
