= Lakes Region Facility =

Former state prison in Laconia, New Hampshire, United States

Coordinates: 43°33′36″N 71°29′41″W

Lakes Region Facility was a state prison in Laconia, Belknap County, New Hampshire, in the United States. The facility was operated by the New Hampshire Department of Corrections, and has been closed as of June 30, 2009 as a result of the late-2000s recession.

The Lakes Region Facility was a minimum custody transitional facility. Its capacity is 400 inmates but averaged about 300 male inmates. The warden of the facility oversaw inmates housed there as well as inmates in the Calumet and North End Transitional Housing Units, as well as the Transitional Work Center. Lakes Region Facility minimum-security offenders provided over 30,000 hours of community service to state and county agencies and Laconia-area non-profit organizations. The Lakes Region Facility employed 153 people, including 105 corrections officers and 48 non-uniformed employees.

Lakes Region was a minimum security transitional prison. In 2004, it became an entirely male facility: minimum security female prisoners were relocated to the Shea Farm Halfway House in Concord, New Hampshire.
