= Cecilia Rich =

American politician

Member of the New Hampshire House of Representatives
- In office December 5, 2018 – August 28, 2024
- Constituency: Strafford 18th (2018–2022); 12th (2022–2024)

Personal details
- Party: Democratic
- Education: University of New Hampshire

Cecilia Rich is a New Hampshire politician.

== Education ==
Rich attended University of New Hampshire.

== Career ==
On November 6, 2018, Rich was elected to the New Hampshire House of Representatives where she represents the Strafford 18 district. Rich assumed office on December 5, 2018. Rich is a Democrat. Rich endorsed Bernie Sanders in the 2020 Democratic Party presidential primaries.

Rich resigned from the House on August 28, 2024.

== Personal life ==
Rich resides in Somersworth, New Hampshire. Rich is married and has two children.
