= Karen Umberger =

American politician

Member of the New Hampshire House of Representatives from the Carroll 1st district
- In office 2008–2012

Member of the New Hampshire House of Representatives from the Carroll 2nd district
- In office 2012–2018
- Succeeded by: Harrison Kanzler
- In office 2020–2022
- Preceded by: Harrison Kanzler

Personal details
- Party: Republican

Karen Umberger is an American politician. She served as a Republican member for the Carroll 1st and 2nd district of the New Hampshire House of Representatives.
