= Corinne Cascadden =

American politician

Member of the New Hampshire House of Representatives from the Coos 5th district
- In office 2022–2024

Personal details
- Party: Democratic

Corinne E. Cascadden is an American politician. She served as a Democratic member for the Coos 5th district of the New Hampshire House of Representatives from 2022 to 2024.
