= Henry Noel (American politician) =

American politician

Member of the New Hampshire House of Representatives from the Coos 3rd district
- In office 2018–2020

Member of the New Hampshire House of Representatives from the Coos 5th district
- Incumbent
- Assumed office 2022 - 2024

Personal details
- Party: Democratic

Henry Noel is an American politician. He serves as a Democratic member for the Coos 5th district of the New Hampshire House of Representatives.
