= Sandra Panek =

American politician

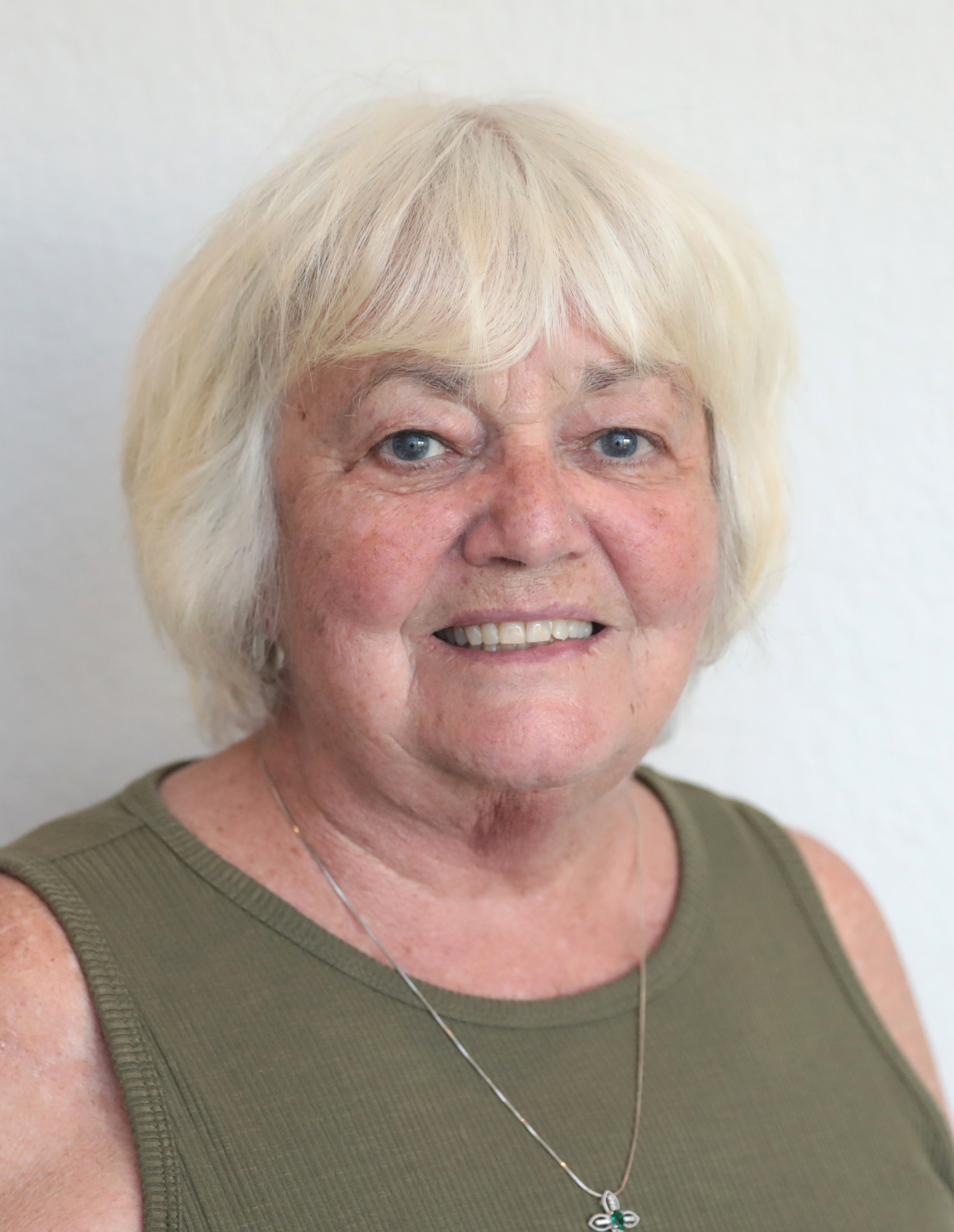

Member of the New Hampshire House of Representatives from the Hillsborough 1st district
- In office December 7, 2022 – March 1, 2026
- Succeeded by: Deborah Kruzel (elect)

Personal details
- Party: Republican

Sandra Panek is an American politician. She served as a Republican member for the Hillsborough 1st district of the New Hampshire House of Representatives. She resigned in March 2026.
