= Deborah Kruzel =

American politician

Member-elect of the New Hampshire House of Representatives from the Hillsborough 1st district
- Assuming office December 2026
- Succeeding: Sandra Panek

Personal details
- Party: Republican

Deborah Kruzel is an American politician. A member of the Republican Party, she is the member-elect for the Hillsborough 1st district of the New Hampshire House of Representatives.
