= Jonathan Morton =

American politician

Member of the New Hampshire House of Representatives from the Hillsborough 39th district
- In office December 4, 2024 – July 15, 2026
- Succeeded by: Ellen Boudreau (elect)

Personal details
- Party: Republican

Jonathan Morton is an American politician. He served as a Republican member for the Hillsborough 39th district of the New Hampshire House of Representatives. He resigned in July 2026.
