= Linda Haskins =

American politician

Member of the New Hampshire House of Representatives from the Rockingham 11th district
- In office December 7, 2022 – July 3, 2026
- Succeeded by: Steven Jones (elect)

Personal details
- Party: Democratic

Linda Haskins is an American politician. She served as a Democratic member for the Rockingham 11th district of the New Hampshire House of Representatives. She resigned in July 2026.
