= Steven Jones (politician) =

American politician

Member-elect of the New Hampshire House of Representatives from the Rockingham 11th district
- Assuming office December 2026
- Succeeding: Linda Haskins

Personal details
- Party: Democratic

Steven Jones is an American politician. A member of the Democratic Party, he is the member-elect for the Rockingham 11th district of the New Hampshire House of Representatives.
