= List of Barack Obama 2008 presidential campaign endorsements from state, local and territory officials =

This is a list of state, local and territory officials who formally endorsed or voiced support for Barack Obama as the Democratic Party's presidential nominee for the 2008 U.S. presidential election.

== Alabama ==
- Alabama State Rep. Merika Coleman (D-Birmingham)

== Arizona ==
- Arizona State Rep. Ed Ableser (D-Tempe)
- Arizona State Rep. Steve Gallardo (D-Phoenix)
- Arizona State Rep. Kyrsten Sinema (D-Phoenix)
- Arizona State Rep. Steve Farley (D-Tucson)
- Tucson City Council Regina Romero
- Former Arizona State Rep. Ted Downing (D-Tucson)

== California ==
=== State ===
State Assembly

- Speaker of the California Assembly Karen Bass (D-Los Angeles)
- California Assemblymember Ted Lieu (D-El Segundo)
- California Assemblymember Sandré Swanson (D-Alameda)
- California Assemblymember Lori Saldana (D-San Diego)
- California Assemblymember Mike Davis (D-Los Angeles)
- Fmr. California Assemblymember Wilma Chan (D-Oakland)
- California State Sen. Gil Cedillo (D-Los Angeles)

State Senate

- California State Sen. Alan Lowenthal (D-Long Beach)
- California State Sen. Mark Ridley-Thomas (D-Culver City)
- California State Sen. Leland Yee (D-San Francisco)

=== Local ===
- Fmr. California State Sen. Martha Escutia (D-Los Angeles)
- Member of the San Francisco Board of Supervisors Tom Ammiano
- West Hollywood Mayor John Duran
- Los Angeles County Supervisor and fmr. U.S. Rep. Yvonne Brathwaite Burke
- Los Angeles City Council President Eric Garcetti
- Los Angeles City Councilman Bernard C. Parks
- Los Angeles City Councilman Bill Rosendahl
- Fmr. California State Controller Steve Westly
- San Francisco District Attorney Kamala Harris
- San Francisco School Board member Jane Kim

== Connecticut ==
- Connecticut State Rep. William Tong (D-Stamford, New Canaan)
- Connecticut State Treasurer Denise Nappier

== Delaware ==
- Delaware Lt. Gov. John Carney (D)
- Delaware Treasurer Jack Markell (D)

== Florida ==
- Florida State Rep. Keith Fitzgerald (D-Sarasota)
- Florida State Rep. Betty Reed (D-Tampa Bay)
- Sarasota City Commissioner Fredd Atkins
- Chair of the Tampa City Council Gwen Miller
- Tampa City Councilwoman Mary Mulhern

== Georgia ==
- Georgia State Sen. Kasim Reed (D-Atlanta)

== Hawaii ==
- Hawaii State Sen. Russell S. Kokubun (D-Honolulu)
- Hawaii State Sen. Clarence K. Nishihara (D-Honolulu)
- Hawaii State Rep. Della Au Belatti (D-Honolulu)
- Hawaii State Rep. Jon Karamatsu (D-Honolulu)
- Hawaii State Rep. Scott Saiki (D-Honolulu)
- Fmr. Hawaii State Rep. Brian Schatz (D-Honolulu)

== Idaho ==
- Idaho State Sen. David Langhorst (D-Boise), Senate assistant minority leader
- Idaho State Sen. Clint Stennett, (D-Ketchum), Senate minority leader
- Idaho State Rep. Wendy Jaquet (D-Ketchum), House minority leader
- Idaho State Rep. Nicole LeFavour (D-Boise)

== Illinois ==
=== House of Representatives ===
- Illinois State Rep. Annazette Collins (D-Chicago)
- Illinois State Rep. Marlow H. Colvin (D-Chicago)
- Illinois State Rep. Monique D. Davis (D-Chicago)
- Illinois State Rep. William Davis (D-Homewood)
- Illinois State Rep. Lisa Dugan (D-Kankakee)
- Illinois State Rep. Kenneth Dunkin (D-Chicago)
- Illinois State Rep. Sara Feigenholtz (D-Chicago)
- Illinois State Rep. Mary E. Flowers (D-Chicago)
- Illinois State Rep. LaShawn Ford (D-Chicago)
- Illinois State Rep. Esther Golar (D-Chicago)
- Illinois State Rep. Careen Gordon (D-Coal City)
- Illinois State Rep. Deborah L. Graham (D-Chicago)
- Illinois State Rep. Constance A. Howard (D-Chicago)
- Illinois State Rep. Elga L. Jefferies (D-Chicago)
- Illinois State Rep. Charles E. Jefferson (D-Rockford)
- Illinois State Rep. Frank Mautino (D-Spring Valley)
- Illinois State Rep. Jack McGuire (D-Joliet)
- Illinois State Rep. David E. Miller (D-Calumet City)
- Illinois State Rep. Milton Patterson (D-Chicago)
- Illinois State Rep. Al Riley (D-Matteson)
- Illinois State Rep. Arthur Turner (D-Chicago)
- Illinois State Rep. Eddie Washington (D-Waukegan)
- Illinois State Rep. Karen Yarbrough (D-Maywood)
- Illinois State Rep. Wyvetter H. Younge (D-East St. Louis)

=== Senate ===
- Illinois State Senate President and Sen. Emil Jones (D-Chicago)
- Illinois State Sen. James Clayborne Jr. (D-Belleville)
- Illinois State Sen. Debbie Halvorson (D-Crete)
- Illinois State Sen. Rickey R. Hendon (D-Chicago)
- Illinois State Sen. Mattie Hunter (D-Chicago)
- Illinois State Sen. Kimberly A. Lightford (D-Chicago)
- Illinois State Sen. Iris Martinez (D-Chicago)
- Illinois State Sen. James Meeks (D-Chicago)
- Illinois State Sen. Kwame Raoul (D-Chicago)
- Illinois State Sen. Donne Trotter (D-Chicago)
- Fmr. Illinois State Sen. Patrick Welch (D-Peru)

=== Constitutional officers ===
- Illinois Attorney General Lisa Madigan (D-Chicago)
- Illinois Secretary of State Jesse White (D-Alton)
- Illinois State Comptroller Daniel Hynes (D-Chicago)

== Indiana ==
=== House of Representatives ===
- Indiana State Rep. Dennis Avery (D-Evansville)
- Indiana State Rep. Jeb Bardon (D-Indianapolis)
- Indiana State Rep. John Bartlett (D-Indianapolis)
- Indiana State Rep. Charlie Brown (D-Gary)
- Indiana State Rep. Bill Crawford (D-Indianapolis)
- Indiana State Rep. Dave Crooks (D-Washington)
- Indiana State Rep. John Day (D-Indianapolis)
- Indiana State Rep. Chet Dobis (D-Merrillville), speaker pro tempore
- Indiana State Rep. Ryan Dvorak (D-South Bend)
- Indiana State Rep. Dale Grubb (D-Covington), Democratic caucus chair
- Indiana State Rep. Phil Hoy (D-Evansville)
- Indiana State Rep. Linda Lawson (D-Hammond)
- Indiana State Rep. Scott Pelath (D-Michigan City)
- Indiana State Rep. Matt Pierce (D-Bloomington)
- Indiana State Rep. Greg Porter (D-Indianapolis)
- Indiana State Rep. Mara Candelaria Reardon (D-Munster)
- Indiana State Rep. Scott Reske (D-Pendleton)
- Indiana State Rep. Vernon Smith (D-Gary)
- Indiana State Rep. Russ Stilwell (D-Boonville), Democratic floor leader
- Indiana State Rep. Vanessa Summers (D-Indianapolis)
- Indiana State Rep. Trent Van Haaften (D-Mount Vernon)

=== Senate ===
- Indiana State Sen. John Broden (South Bend)
- Indiana State Sen. Timothy Lanane (D-Anderson)
- Indiana State Sen. Lindel Hume (D-Princeton)
- Indiana State Sen. Earline S. Rogers (D-Gary)

== Iowa ==
=== House of Representatives ===
- Iowa State Rep. Ako Abdul-Samad (D-Des Moines)
- Iowa State Rep. Deborah Berry (D-Waterloo)
- Iowa State Rep. Elesha Gayman (D-Des Moines)
- Iowa State Rep. David Jacoby (D-Coralville)
- Iowa State Rep. Pam Jochum (D-Dubuque)
- Iowa State Rep. Helen Miller (D-Fort Dodge)
- Iowa State Rep. Donovan Olson (D-Boone)
- Iowa State Rep. Tyler Olson (D-Cedar Rapids)
- Iowa State Rep. Janet Petersen (D-Des Moines)
- Iowa State Rep. Brian Quirk (D-Des Moines)
- Iowa State Rep. Mark Smith (D-Marshalltown)

=== Senate ===
- Iowa State Sen. Joe Bolkcom (D-Iowa City)
- Iowa State Sen. Robert Dvorsky (D-Coralville)
- Iowa State Sen. Bill Heckroth (D-Waverly)
- Iowa State Sen. Rich Olive (D-Story City)
- Iowa State Sen. Tom Rielly (D-Oskaloosa)
- Iowa State Sen. Steve Warnstadt (D-Sioux City)
- Iowa State Sen. Frank Wood (D-Eldridge)

=== Constitutional officers ===
- Iowa Attorney General Tom Miller (D-Dubuque)
- Iowa State Treasurer Michael Fitzgerald
- Fmr. Chairman of the Iowa Democratic Party Gordon R. Fischer

== Kansas ==
=== House of Representatives ===
- Kansas State Rep. Paul Davis (D-Lawrence)
- Kansas State Rep. Oletha Faust-Goudeau (D-Wichita)
- Kansas State Rep. Tom Hawk (D-Manhattan)
- Kansas State Rep. Broderick Henderson (D-Kansas City)
- Kansas State Rep. Harold Lane (D-Topeka)
- Kansas State Rep. Melody McCray-Miller (D-Wichita)
- Kansas State Rep. Cindy Neighbor (D-Shawnee)
- Kansas State Rep. Candy Ruff (D-Leavenworth)
- Kansas State Rep. Valdenia Winn (D-Kansas City)

=== Senate ===
- Kansas State Senate Minority Leader Anthony Hensley (D-Topeka)
- Kansas State Sen. Donald Betts (D-Wichita)
- Kansas State Sen. Marci Francisco (D-Lawrence)
- Kansas State Sen. David Haley (D-Kansas City)
- Kansas State Sen. Chris Steineger (D-Kansas City)

== Kentucky ==
=== State ===
- Kentucky Lieutenant Governor Daniel Mongiardo (D-KY)
- Kentucky State Sen. Gerald Neal (D-Louisville)
- Kentucky State Sen. Ernesto Scorsone (D-Fayette)
- Fmr. Kentucky State Sen. Nicholas Kafoglis (D-Warren)
- Fmr. Kentucky State Sen. David Karem (D-Jefferson)
- Fmr. Kentucky State Sen. Michael Moloney (D-Fayette)
- Fmr. Kentucky State Sen. Danny Meyer (D-Oldham)
- Fmr. Kentucky State Sen. Georgia Davis Powers (D-Jefferson)
- Fmr. Kentucky State Sen. Tim Shaughnessy (D-Jefferson)
- Kentucky State Rep. Leslie Combs (D-Pike)
- Kentucky State Rep. Jim Glenn (D-Daviess)
- Kentucky State Rep. Dennis Keene (D-Campbell)
- Kentucky State Rep. Reginald Meeks (D-Louisville)
- Kentucky State Rep. Darryl Owens (D-Jefferson)
- Kentucky State Rep. Ruth Ann Palumbo (D-Fayette)
- Kentucky State Rep. Jim Wayne (D-Jefferson)
- Kentucky State Rep. Susan Westrom (D-Fayette)
- Fmr. Kentucky State Rep. David Tandy
- Fmr. State Treasurer Jonathan Miller (D-Fayette)

== Louisiana ==
- Louisiana State Sen. Lydia P. Jackson (D-Shreveport)
- Louisiana State Rep. Rick Gallot Jr. (D-Ruston)
- Louisiana State Rep. Avon Honey (D-Baton Rouge)
- Louisiana State Rep. Karen Carter Peterson (D-New Orleans)

== Maine ==
- Maine State House Speaker Glenn A. Cummings (D-Portland)

== Maryland ==
=== State ===
House of Delegates

- Maryland State Del. Curt Anderson (D-Chairman Baltimore City Delegation)
- Maryland State Del. Saqib Ali (D-Montgomery)
- Maryland State Del. and House Majority Leader Kumar P. Barve (D-Montgomery)
- Maryland State Del. Elizabeth Bobo (D-Howard)
- Maryland State Del. Talmadge Branch (D-Baltimore City)
- Maryland State Del. Aisha Braveboy (D-Prince George's)
- Maryland State Del. William A. Bronrott (D-Montgomery)
- Maryland State Del. Emmett C. Burns Jr. (D-Baltimore)
- Maryland State Del. Rudolph C. Cane (D-Eastern Shore)
- Maryland State Del. Jill P. Carter (D-Baltimore City)
- Maryland State Del. Ann Marie Doory (D-Baltimore City)
- Maryland State Del. Brian J. Feldman (D-Montgomery)
- Maryland State Del. William Frick (D-Montgomery)
- Maryland State Del. James W. Gilchrist (D-Montgomery)
- Maryland State Del. Cheryl Glenn (D-Baltimore City)
- Maryland State Del. Guy Guzzone (D-Howard)
- Maryland State Del. Hattie Harrison (D-Baltimore City)
- Maryland State Del. Keith E. Haynes (D-Baltimore City)
- Maryland State Del. Marvin E. Holmes Jr. (D-Prince George's)
- Maryland State Del. James Hubbard (D-Prince George's)
- Maryland State Del. Tom Hucker (D-Montgomery)
- Maryland State Del. Jolene Ivey (D-Prince George's)
- Maryland State Del. Sue Kullen (D-Calvert)
- Maryland State Del. Gerron Levi (D-Prince George's)
- Maryland State Del. Dan K. Morhaim(D-Baltimore County)
- Maryland State Del. Nathaniel T. Oaks (D-Baltimore City)
- Maryland State Del. Joseline Pena-Melnyk (D-Prince George's)
- Maryland State Del. James Proctor (D-Prince George's)
- Maryland State Del. Kirill Reznik (D-Montgomery)
- Maryland State Del. Barbara Robinson (D-Baltimore City)
- Maryland State Del. Samuel I. Rosenberg (D-Baltimore City)
- Maryland State Del. Victor R. Ramirez (D-Prince George's)
- Maryland State Del. Justin Ross (D-Prince George's)
- Maryland State Del. Shawn Z. Tarrant (D-Baltimore City)
- Maryland State Del. Herman L. Taylor Jr. (D-Montgomery)
- Maryland State Del. Veronica L. Turner (D-Prince George's)
- Maryland State Del. Jay Walker (D-Prince George's)

Senate

- Maryland State Sen. James Brochin (D-Baltimore)
- Maryland State Sen. Joan Carter Conway (D-Baltimore City)
- Maryland State Sen. Ulysses Currie (D-Prince George's)
- Maryland State Sen. Nathaniel Exum (D-Prince George's)
- Maryland State Sen. Brian E. Frosh (D-Montgomery)
- Maryland State Sen. Robert J. Garagiola (D-Rockville)
- Maryland State Sen. Lisa Gladden (D-Baltimore)
- Maryland State Sen. David C. Harrington (D-Prince George's)
- Maryland State Sen. Verna L. Jones (D-Baltimore)
- Maryland State Sen. Delores G. Kelley (D-Baltimore)
- Maryland State Sen. Nathaniel J. McFadden (D-Baltimore)
- Maryland State Sen. Thomas M. Middleton (D-Charles)
- Maryland State Sen. C. Anthony Muse (D-Prince George's)
- Maryland State Sen. Douglas JJ Peters (D-Prince George's)
- Maryland State Sen. Jamie Raskin (D-Montgomery)
- Maryland State Sen. James Robey (D-Howard)
- Maryland State Sen. Robert Zirkin (D-Baltimore)

Former state officeholders

- Fmr. Governor Parris Glendening
- Fmr. Maryland State Del. Gil Genn (D-Montgomery)
- Fmr. Maryland State Del. Joan Pitkin (D-Prince George's)
- Fmr. Maryland State Del. Gareth Murray (D-Montgomery)
- Fmr. Maryland State Del. Rushern Baker (D-Prince George's)
- Fmr. Maryland State Del. Neil Quinter
- Maryland Attorney General Doug Gansler
- Fmr. Attorney General Stephen H. Sachs
- Maryland State Comptroller Peter Franchot (D-MD)

=== County ===
- Anne Arundel County Councilman Joshua J. Cohen
- Baltimore County Councilman Kenneth Oliver
- Harford County Councilwoman Mary Ann Lisanti
- Howard County Executive Kenneth Ulman
- Howard County Councilman Calvin Ball
- Howard County Councilwoman Jennifer Terrasa
- Montgomery County Councilman Roger Berliner
- Montgomery County Councilman Marc Elrich
- Prince George's County Councilman William Campos
- Prince George's County Councilman Tony Knotts
- Prince George's County State's Attorney Glenn F. Ivey
- Prince George's County Sheriff Michael Jackson

=== Local ===
- Baltimore Mayor Sheila Dixon
- Baltimore City State's Attorney Pat Jessamy
- Baltimore City Council President Stephanie Rawlings Blake
- Baltimore City Councilwoman Sharon Middleton
- Fmr. Baltimore City Councilman Keiffer J. Mitchell Jr.
- Gaithersburg City Councilman Ryan Spiegel

== Massachusetts ==
- Massachusetts State Sen. Benjamin Downing (D-Pittsfield)
- Massachusetts State Sen. Dianne Wilkerson (D-Boston)
- Massachusetts State Rep. Jamie Eldridge (D-Acton)
- Massachusetts State Rep. Linda Dorcena Forry (D-Boston)
- Massachusetts State Rep. John H. Rogers (D-Norwood)
- Massachusetts State Rep. Michael F. Rush (D-Boston)
- Boston City Council Councilman Michael F. Flaherty
- Boston City Councilman Michael P. Ross
- Boston City Councilman Charles Yancey
- Boston City Councilman Sam Yoon

== Michigan ==
- Michigan State Sen. Hansen Clarke (D-Detroit)
- Michigan State Rep. Bert Johnson (D-Highland Park)
- Michigan State Rep. Aldo Vagnozzi (D-Farmington Hills)
- Michigan State Rep. Coleman Young II (D-Detroit)

== Minnesota ==
=== House ===
- Minnesota State Rep. John Benson (D-Minnetonka)
- Minnesota State Rep. Augustine 'Willie' Dominguez
- Minnesota State Rep. Tim Faust (D-Mora)
- Minnesota State Rep. Frank Hornstein
- Minnesota State Rep. Mike Jaros
- Minnesota State Rep. John Lesch

=== Senate ===
- Minnesota State Sen. Terri Bonoff (D-Hopkins)
- Minnesota State Sen. Dick Cohen (D-Saint Paul)
- Minnesota State Sen. John Marty (D-Roseville)
- Minnesota State Sen. Katie Sieben (D-Newport)
- Minnesota State Sen. Patricia Torres Ray (D-Minneapolis)

=== Local ===
- Minneapolis Council Member Elizabeth Glidden
- Minneapolis Council Member Betsy Hodges
- Minneapolis Council Member Robert Lilligren
- Minneapolis Council Member Paul Ostrow
- Minneapolis Council Member Ralph Remington
- Minneapolis Council Member Don Samuels

== Missouri ==
- Missouri State Rep. Maria Chappelle-Nadal (D-University City)
- Missouri State Auditor Susan Montee

== Montana ==
=== House ===
- Montana State Rep. Mary Caferro (D-Helena)
- Montana State Rep. Bob Ebinger (D-Livingston)
- Montana State Rep. Ron Erickson (D-Missoula)
- Montana State Rep. Dave Gallik (D-Helena)
- Montana State Rep. Galen Hollenbaugh (D-Helena)
- Montana State Rep. Jim Keane (D-Butte)
- Montana State Rep. Dave McAlpin (D-Missoula), minority whip
- Montana State Rep. Mike Phillips (D-Bozeman)
- Montana State Rep. Michele Reinhart (D-Missoula)
- Montana State Rep. Kendall Van Dyk (D-Billings)
- Montana State Rep. Jonathan Windy Boy (D-Box Elder), also a councilman for the Chippewa Cree Tribe
- Fmr. Montana State Rep. Paul Clark (D-Trout Creek)
- Fmr. Montana State Rep. Eve Franklin (D-Great Falls)
- Fmr. Montana State Rep. Ray Peck (D-Havre)
- Fmr. Montana State Rep. Bill Whitehead (D-Wolf Point)

=== Senate ===
- Montana State Sen. Larry Jent (D-Bozeman)
- Montana State Sen. Jesse Laslovich (D-Anaconda)
- Montana State Sen. Greg Lind (D-Missoula)
- Montana State Sen. Don Ryan (D-Great Falls)
- Montana State Sen. Frank Smith (D-Poplar)
- Montana State Sen. Dave Wanzenreid (D-Missoula)
- Fmr. Montana State Sen. Steve Doherty (D-Great Falls)

=== Statewide ===
- Fmr. Montana Supreme Court Justice Terry Trieweiler
- Fmr. Montana Supreme Court Justice Jim Regnier
- Montana Public Service Commissioner Greg Jergeson

== Nevada ==
- Nevada State Sen. Steven Horsford (D-North Las Vegas)
- Nevada State Sen. Mike Schneider (D-Las Vegas)
- Fmr. Nevada State Sen. Helen Foley
- Nevada Assemblymember Kelvin Atkinson (D-North Las Vegas)
- Nevada Assemblymember Mo Denis (D-Las Vegas)
- Nevada Assemblymember Marilyn Kirkpatrick (D-Las Vegas)
- Nevada Assemblymember Sheila Leslie (D-Reno)
- Nevada Assemblymember Harvey Munford (D-Las Vegas)

== New Hampshire ==
- New Hampshire State Rep. Dennis Abbott (D-Newmarket)
- New Hampshire State Rep. Susan Almy (D-Lebanon)
- New Hampshire State Rep. Deborah Billian (D-Rochester)
- New Hampshire State Rep. Elizabeth Blanchard (D-Concord)
- New Hampshire State Rep. David Borden (D-New Castle)
- New Hampshire State Rep. Pennington Brown (D-Epping)
- New Hampshire State Rep. Edward Butler (D-Hart's Location)
- New Hampshire State Rep. Kimberley Casey (D-East Kingston)
- New Hampshire State Rep. Jennifer Daler (D-Temple)
- New Hampshire State Rep. Eileen Flockhart (D-Exeter)
- New Hampshire State Rep. Jeffrey Fontas (D-Nashua)
- New Hampshire State Rep. John Henson (D-Exeter)
- New Hampshire State Rep. Sarah Hutz (D-Dover)
- New Hampshire State Rep. Jane Kelley (D-Hampton)
- New Hampshire State Rep. Sally Kelly (D-Chichester)
- New Hampshire State Rep. James Kennedy (D-Exeter)
- New Hampshire State Rep. Nickolas Levasseur (D-Manchester)
- New Hampshire State Rep. Sid Lovett (D-Holderness)
- New Hampshire State Rep. Jesse Martineau (D-Manchester)
- New Hampshire State Rep. Shawn Mickelonis (D-Rochester)
- New Hampshire State Rep. Bonnie Mitchell (D-Jaffrey)
- New Hampshire State Rep. Sharon Nordgren (D-Hanover)
- New Hampshire State Rep. Kay Oppenheimer (D-Strafford)
- New Hampshire State Rep. Margaret Porter (D-Epsom)
- New Hampshire State Rep. James Powers (D-Exeter)
- New Hampshire State Rep. Kris Roberts (D-Keene)
- New Hampshire State Rep. Cindy Rosenwald (D-Nashua)
- New Hampshire State Rep. Tara Sad (D-Walpole)
- New Hampshire State Rep. Carla Skinder (D-Cornish)
- New Hampshire State Rep. Nancy Warren (D-Rochester)
- New Hampshire State Rep. Lucy Weber (D-Walpole)
- New Hampshire State Sen. Peter Burling (D-Cornish)
- New Hampshire State Sen. Jacalyn Cilley (D-Berlin)
- New Hampshire State Sen. Martha Fuller Clark (D-Portsmouth)
- New Hampshire State Sen. Harold Janeway (D-Webster)
- Chair of the Rockingham County Democratic Committee Lenore Patton

== New Jersey ==
State

- New Jersey State Sen. John Adler (D-Cherry Hill)
- New Jersey State Sen. Sandra Bolden Cunningham (D-Jersey City)
- New Jersey State Sen. Fred Madden (D-Camden/Gloucester)
- New Jersey State Sen. Dana Redd (D-Camden) and DNC member
- New Jersey State Sen. Stephen M. Sweeney (D-Gloucester/Salem/Cumberland), majority leader
- New Jersey State Sen. Shirley Turner (D-Lawrence)
- New Jersey State Sen. Loretta Weinberg (D-Teaneck)
- New Jersey Assemblymember Neil M. Cohen (D-Union)
- New Jersey Assemblymember Elease Evans (D-Paterson)
- New Jersey Assemblymember Linda R. Greenstein (D-Plainsboro)
- New Jersey Assemblymember Mila Jasey (D-South Orange)
- New Jersey Assemblymember Gordon M. Johnson (D-Englewood)
- New Jersey Assemblymember and Washington Township Mayor Paul D. Moriarty (D-Washington Township)
- New Jersey Assemblymember L. Harvey Smith (D-Jersey City)
- New Jersey Assemblymember L. Grace Spencer (D-Hillside and Newark)
- New Jersey Assemblymember Cleopatra Tucker (D-Newark)

County

- Camden County Democratic Party Co-chair & DNC Member Donald Norcross
- Camden County Democratic Party Co-chair James Beach
- Fmr. Camden County Democratic Party Chairman George E. Norcross III

Local

- Camden City Mayor Gwendolyn Faison
- Marty Small, Atlantic City councilman

== New Mexico ==
- New Mexico State Rep. Joseph Cervantes (D-Las Cruces)
- New Mexico State Rep. Nathan P. Cote (D-Las Cruces)
- New Mexico State Rep. Antonio Luján (D-Las Cruces)
- New Mexico State Majority Leader Rep. W. Ken Martinez (D-Las Cruces)

== New York ==
- New York State Sen. Eric Adams (D-Brooklyn)
- New York State Sen. Bill Perkins (D-Harlem)
- New York State Sen. John L. Sampson (D-Brooklyn)
- New York Assemblymember Karim Camara (D-Brooklyn)
- New York Assemblymember Hakeem Jeffries (D-Brooklyn)
- New York City Councilman Albert Vann (D-Brooklyn)
- Preeta D. Bansal, former solicitor general of the State of New York (D-NY)

== North Carolina ==
- North Carolina Lt. Governor Bev Perdue, candidate for governor
- North Carolina State Treasurer Richard H. Moore, candidate for governor
- North Carolina State Sen. Doug Berger (D-Youngsville)
- North Carolina State Sen. Charlie Dannelly (D-Raleigh)
- North Carolina State Sen. Katie Dorsett (D-Raleigh)
- North Carolina State Sen. Anthony Foriest (D-Graham)
- North Carolina State Sen. Linda Garrou (D-Winston-Salem)
- North Carolina State Sen. Malcolm Graham (D-Charlotte)
- North Carolina State Sen. Clark Jenkins (D-Tarboro)
- North Carolina State Sen. Edward Jones (D-Raleigh)
- North Carolina State Sen. Eleanor Kinnaird (D-Carrboro)
- North Carolina State Sen. Vernon Malone (D-Raleigh)
- North Carolina State Sen. Floyd McKissick Jr. (D-Raleigh)
- North Carolina State Sen. Tony Rand (D-Fayetteville), Senate majority leader
- North Carolina State Rep. Alma Adams (D-Greensboro)
- North Carolina State Rep. Dan Blue (D-Raleigh), fmr. speaker of the House
- North Carolina State Rep. Angela Bryant (D-Rocky Mount)
- North Carolina State Rep. Becky Carney (D-Charlotte)
- North Carolina State Rep. Bill Faison (D-Durham)
- North Carolina State Rep. Jean Farmer-Butterfield (D-Wilson)
- North Carolina State Rep. Rick Glazier (D-Fayetteville)
- North Carolina State Rep. Larry Hall (D-Durham)
- North Carolina State Rep. Ty Harrell (D-Raleigh)
- North Carolina State Rep. Pricey Harrison (D-Greensboro)
- North Carolina State Rep. Sandra Hughes (D-Wilmington)
- North Carolina State Rep. Marvin Lucas (D-Spring Lake)
- North Carolina State Rep. Grier Martin (D-Raleigh)
- North Carolina State Rep. Annie Mobley (D-Ahoskie)
- North Carolina State Rep. Mickey Michaux (D-Durham)
- North Carolina State Rep. Edith Warren (D-Farmville)
- North Carolina State Rep. Michael Wray (D-Gaston)
- Fmr. State Rep. Phil Baddour (D), fmr. House Democratic Leader
- Fmr. State Supreme Court Chief Justice Henry Frye

== North Dakota ==
- North Dakota State Sen. Art Behm (D-Niagara)
- North Dakota State Sen. Tom Fiebiger (D-Fargo)
- North Dakota State Sen. Joan Heckaman (D-New Rockford)
- North Dakota State Sen. Joel Heitkamp (D-Hankinson)
- North Dakota State Sen. Aaron Krauter (D-Regent)
- North Dakota State Sen. Richard Marcellais (D-Belcourt)
- North Dakota State Sen. Carolyn Nelson (D-Fargo), assistant minority leader
- North Dakota State Sen. David O'Connell (D-Lansford), minority leader
- North Dakota State Sen. Jim Pomeroy (D-Fargo)
- North Dakota State Sen. Tracy Potter (D-Bismarck)
- North Dakota State Sen. Ryan Taylor (D-Towner)
- North Dakota State Sen. John Warner (D-Ryder)
- North Dakota State Rep. Tracy Boe (D-Milo)
- North Dakota State Rep. Mary Ekstrom (D-Fargo)
- North Dakota State Rep. Rod Froelich (D-Selfridge)
- North Dakota State Rep. Eliot Glassheim (D-Grand Forks)
- North Dakota State Rep. Chris Griffin (D-Larimore)
- North Dakota State Rep. Ed Gruchalla (D-Fargo)
- North Dakota State Rep. Pam Gulleson (D-Rutland)
- North Dakota State Rep. Lyle Hanson (D-Jamestown)
- North Dakota State Rep. Scot Kelsh (D-Fargo)
- North Dakota State Rep. Joe Kroeber (D-Jamestown)
- North Dakota State Rep. Ralph Metcalf (D-Valley City)
- North Dakota State Rep. Louis Pinkerton (D-Minot)
- North Dakota State Rep. Arlo Schmidt (D-Maddock)
- North Dakota State Rep. Jasper Schneider (D-Fargo)
- North Dakota State Rep. Dorvan Solberg (D-Ray)
- North Dakota State Rep. Lisa Wolf (D-Minot)
- North Dakota State Rep. Steve Zaiser (D-Fargo)

== Ohio ==
- Ohio State Sen. Capri Cafaro (D-Youngstown)
- Ohio State Sen. Eric Kearney (D-Cincinnati)
- Ohio State Sen. Tom Roberts (D-Dayton)
- Ohio State Sen. Tom Sawyer (D-Akron)
- Ohio State Sen. Shirley Smith (D-Cleveland)
- Ohio State Rep. Joyce Beatty (D-Columbus), House Minority Leader
- Ohio State Rep. Jennifer Brady (D-Cleveland)
- Ohio State Rep. Ted Celeste (D-Columbus)
- Ohio State Rep. Robert Hagan (D-Youngstown)
- Ohio State Rep. Tom Letson (D-Warren)
- Ohio State Rep. Clayton Luckie (D-Dayton)
- Ohio State Rep. Dan Stewart (D-Columbus)
- Ohio State Rep. Vernon Sykes (D-Akron)
- Ohio State Rep. Sandra Williams (D-Cleveland)
- Ohio State Rep. Tyrone Yates (D-Cincinnati)
- Ohio State State Treasurer Richard Cordray (D-OH)
- Chairman of the Cuyahoga County Democratic Party Tim Hagan
- Cuyahoga County Commissioner President Peter Lawson Jones

== Oklahoma ==
- Oklahoma State Sen. Mike Morgan, Senate president pro tem (D-Stillwater)
- Oklahoma State Sen. Tom Adelson (D-Tulsa)
- Oklahoma State Sen. Andrew Rice (D-Oklahoma City)
- Oklahoma State Rep. Jabar Shumate (D-Tulsa)
- Oklahoma State Rep. Ryan Dean Kiesel (D-Seminole)

== Oregon ==
- Oregon State Sen. Alan Bates (D-Ashland)
- Oregon State Sen. Margaret Carter, Senate president pro tem (D-Portland)
- Oregon State Sen. Avel Gordly (D-Portland)
- Oregon State Sen. Floyd Prozanski (D-South Lane and North Douglas Counties)
- Oregon State Sen. Ben Westlund (D-Tumalo)
- Oregon State Rep. Jeff Barker (D-Aloha)
- Oregon State Rep. Phil Barnhart (D-Central Lane and Linn Counties)
- Oregon State Rep. Suzanne Bonamici (D-Washington County)
- Oregon State Rep. Peter Buckley (D-Ashland)
- Oregon State Rep. Ben Cannon (D-Portland)
- Oregon State Rep. Brian Clem (D-Salem)
- Oregon State Rep. Chris Edwards (D-West Eugene, Santa Clara, Junction City, Cheshire & Alvadore)
- Oregon State Rep. David Edwards (D-Hillsboro)
- Oregon State Rep. Larry Galizio (D-Tigard)
- Oregon State Rep. Paul Holvey (D-Eugene)
- Oregon State Rep. Betty Komp (D-Woodburn)
- Oregon State Rep. Tina Kotek (D-North/NE Portland)
- Oregon State Rep. Jeff Merkley, House speaker
- Oregon State Rep. Mary Nolan (D-Portland)
- Oregon State Rep. Tobias Read (D-Beaverton)
- Oregon State Rep. Diane Rosenbaum, House speaker pro tem
- Oregon State Rep. Mike Schaufler (D-Happy Valley)
- Oregon State Rep. Chip Shields (D-Portland)
- Oregon State Rep. Brad Witt (D-Clatskanie)
- State Treasurer Randall Edwards (D-Portland)
- Superintendent of Public Instruction Susan Castillo (D-Eugene)

== Pennsylvania ==
- Pennsylvania State Sen. Lisa Boscola (D-Lehigh Valley)
- Pennsylvania State Sen. Vincent Hughes (D-Philadelphia), caucus secretary
- Pennsylvania State Sen. Shirley Kitchen (D-Philadelphia)
- Pennsylvania State Sen. Robert J. Mellow (D-Lackawanna), minority floor leader
- Pennsylvania State Sen. Anthony H. Williams (D-Philadelphia)
- Pennsylvania State Rep. Mark B. Cohen (D-Philadelphia)
- Pennsylvania State Rep. Harold James (D-Pittsburgh)
- Pennsylvania State Rep. Tony Payton (D-Philadelphia)
- Pennsylvania State Rep. Joseph Preston Jr. (D-Allegheny)
- Pennsylvania State Rep. Josh Shapiro (D-Montgomery)
- Pennsylvania State Rep. Chelsa Wagner (D-Allegheny)
- Pennsylvania State Rep. Jewell Williams (D-Philadelphia)
- Philadelphia City Council Member Jannie Blackwell
- Philadelphia City Council Member W. Wilson Goode Jr.
- Philadelphia City Council Member Bill Green
- Philadelphia City Council Member Curtis Jones
- Philadelphia City Council Member Jim Kenney
- Philadelphia City Council Member Donna Reed Miller
- Philadelphia City Council President Anna C. Verna
- Fmr. Philadelphia City Council Member Carol Ann Campbell, superdelegate
- Pittsburgh City Council Member Bruce Kraus
- Pittsburgh City Council Member Patrick Dowd
- DNC member Leon Lynch

== Puerto Rico ==
- Fmr. Secretary of Justice Pedro Pierluisi

== Rhode Island ==
- Rhode Island Attorney General Patrick C. Lynch

== South Carolina ==
- South Carolina State Sen. Glenn G. Reese (D-Inman)
- South Carolina State Rep. Joseph H. Jefferson (D-Pineville)
- South Carolina State Rep. J. Todd Rutherford (D-Columbia)
- South Carolina State Rep. Bakari Sellers (D-Denmark)
- Fmr. South Carolina Supreme Court Chief Justice Ernest A. Finney Jr.
- Fmr. South Carolina Superintendent of Education Inez Tenenbaum
- Fmr. Chairman of the South Carolina Democratic Party Joe Erwin

== South Dakota ==
- South Dakota State Sen. Julie Bartling (D-Burke)
- South Dakota State Sen. Gary Hanson (D-Sisseton)
- South Dakota State Sen. Scott Heidepriem (D-Sioux Falls), minority leader
- South Dakota State Sen. Alan Hoerth (D-Burke)
- South Dakota State Sen. Jim Hundstad (D-Bath)
- South Dakota State Sen. Sandy Jerstad (D-Sioux Falls)
- South Dakota State Sen. Tom Katus (D-Rapid City)
- South Dakota State Sen. Frank Kloucek (D-Scotland)
- South Dakota State Sen. Ryan Maher (D-Isabel)
- South Dakota State Sen. Ben Nesselhuf (D-Vermillion)
- South Dakota State Sen. James R. Peterson (D-Revillo)
- South Dakota State Sen. Nancy Turbak Berry (D-Watertown)
- South Dakota State Sen. Theresa Two Bulls (D-Pine Ridge)
- South Dakota State Rep. Jim Bradford (D-Pine Ridge)
- South Dakota State Rep. Quinten Burg (D-Wessington Springs)
- South Dakota State Rep. H. Paul Dennert (D-Columbia)
- South Dakota State Rep. Richard Engels (D-Hartford)
- South Dakota State Rep. David Gassman (D-Canova)
- South Dakota State Rep. Clayton Halverson (D-Veblen)
- South Dakota State Rep. Dale Hargens (D-Miller), minority leader
- South Dakota State Rep. Larry Lucas (D-Mission)
- South Dakota State Rep. Garry Moore (D-Yankton)
- South Dakota State Rep. Eldon Nygaard (D-Vermillion)
- South Dakota State Rep. Bill Thompson (D-Sioux Falls)
- South Dakota State Rep. Tom Van Norman (D-Eagle Butte)

== Texas ==
- Texas State Sen. Rodney Ellis (D-Fort Bend, Harris)
- Texas State Sen. and fmr. Austin, Texas Mayor Kirk Watson (D-Austin)
- Texas State Sen. Royce West (D-Dallas)
- Texas State Rep. Roberto R. Alonzo (D-Dallas)
- Texas State Rep. Rafael Anchia (D-Dallas)
- Texas State Rep. Garnet Coleman (D-Houston)
- Texas State Rep. Yvonne Davis (D-Dallas)
- Texas State Rep. Jim Dunnam (D-Waco)
- Texas State Rep. Jessica Farrar (D-Houston)
- Texas State Rep. Pete Gallego (D-Alpine), chairman of the Mexican American Legislative Caucus
- Texas State Rep. Juan M. Garcia (D-Corpus Christi)
- Texas State Rep. Ana Hernandez (D-Houston)
- Texas State Rep. Eddie Lucio III (D-Brownsville)
- Texas State Rep. Dora Olivo (D-Richmond)
- Texas State Rep. Mark Strama (D-Austin)
- Texas State Rep. Senfronia Thompson (D-Houston)
- Houston City Council member Peter Hoyt Brown
- Houston City Council member Ronald Green
- Fmr. Texas Agriculture Commissioner Jim Hightower
- Commissioner of Brownsville, Texas Charlie Atkinson (District 2)
- Commissioner of Brownsville, Texas Edward Camarillo (District 4)
- Cameron County, Texas Commissioner David Garza
- Fmr. Harlingen, Texas Commissioner Heriberto "Eddie" Medrano
- Fmr. Harlingen, Texas Commissioner Frank Puente
- Fmr. Brownsville, Texas Commissioner Ernesto De Leon

== Utah ==
- Utah State Sen. Gene Davis (D-Salt Lake City), Senate minority whip
- Utah State Sen. Scott McCoy (D-Salt Lake City)
- Utah State Rep. Lynn Hemingway (D-Salt Lake City)
- Utah State Rep. Christine Johnson (D-Salt Lake City)
- Utah State Rep. Brad King (D-Price), House minority leader
- Utah State Rep. David Litvack (D-Salt Lake City), House minority whip
- Utah State Rep. Phil Riesen (D-Salt Lake City), minority caucus manager & Utah state rep. for Obama for America
- Utah State Rep. Jen Seelig (D-Salt Lake City)
- Utah State Rep. Carol Spackman Moss (D-Salt Lake City), minority assistant whip
- Utah State Rep. Mark Wheatley (D-Murray)
- Utah State Rep. Larry Wiley (D-West Valley City)
- Utah State Democratic Party Chairman Wayne Holland

== Vermont ==
- Vermont Attorney General William Sorrell

== Virginia ==
- Virginia State Sen. John S. Edwards (D-Roanoke)
- Virginia State Sen. Mark Herring (D-Loudoun County)
- Virginia State Sen. Edd Houck (D-Spotsylvania)
- Virginia State Sen. Janet Howell (D-Fairfax)
- Virginia State Sen. and fmr. Hampton, Virginia Mayor Mamie Locke (D-Hampton)
- Virginia State Sen. Louise Lucas (D-Portsmouth)
- Virginia State Sen. A. Donald McEachin (D-Richmond)
- Virginia State Sen. Henry L. Marsh (D-Richmond)
- Virginia State Sen. Ralph Northam (D-Norfolk)
- Virginia State Sen. Toddy Puller (D-Fairfax)
- Virginia State Del. Kenneth Cooper Alexander (D-Norfolk)
- Virginia State Del. Robert H. Brink (D-Arlington)
- Virginia State Del. Ward Armstrong (D-Portsmouth)
- Virginia State Del. Kristen J. Amundson (D-Mount Vernon)
- Virginia State Del. Mamye BaCote (D-Newport News)
- Virginia State Del. David L. Englin (D-Alexandria)
- Virginia State Del. Robert D. Hull (D-Falls Church)
- Virginia State Del. Dwight Clinton Jones (D-Richmond)
- Virginia State Del. Dave W. Marsden (D-Burke)
- Virginia State Del. Jennifer McClellan (D-Richmond)
- Virginia State Del. Kenneth R. Melvin (D-Portsmouth)
- Virginia State Del. Joseph D. Morrissey (D-Richmond)
- Virginia State Del. Paul F. Nichols (D-Lake Ridge)
- Virginia State Del. Kenneth R. Plum (D-Reston)
- Virginia State Del. James M. Scott (D-Fairfax)
- Virginia State Del. Mark D. Sickles (D-Franconia)
- Virginia State Del. Shannon R. Valentine (D-Lynchburg)
- Virginia State Del. Onzlee Ware (D-Roanoke)
- Virginia State Del. Vivian E. Watts (D-Annandale)

== Washington ==
- Washington State Senate Majority Leader Lisa Brown (D-Spokane)
- Washington State Sen. Rosa Franklin (D-Tacoma)
- Washington State Sen. Brian Hatfield (D-Raymond)
- Washington State Sen. Ken Jacobsen (D-Seattle)
- Washington State Sen. Claudia Kauffman (D-Kent)
- Washington State Sen. Derek Kilmer (D-Gig Harbor)
- Washington State Sen. Adam Kline (D-Seattle)
- Washington State Sen. Mary Margaret Haugen (D-Camano Island)
- Washington State Sen. Chris Marr (D-Spokane)
- Washington State Sen. Rosemary McAuliffe (D-Seattle)
- Washington State Sen. and Senate Democratic Caucus Vice-chair Ed Murray (D-Seattle)
- Washington State Sen. Eric Oemig (D-Kirkland)
- Washington State Sen. Craig Pridemore (D-Vancouver)
- Washington State Sen. Tim Sheldon (D-Potlatch)
- Washington State Rep. Maralyn Chase (D-Shoreline)
- Washington State House Speaker Frank Chopp (D-Seattle)
- Washington State Rep. Mary Lou Dickerson (D-Seattle)
- Washington State Rep. Deborah Eddy (D-Bellevue)
- Washington State Rep. Bob Hasegawa (D-Seattle)
- Washington State Rep. Christopher Hurst (D-King County)
- Washington State Rep. Fred Jarrett (D-Bellevue)
- Washington State Rep. Patricia Lantz (D-Bremerton)
- Washington State Rep. John McCoy (D-Everett)
- Washington State Rep. Jamie Pedersen (D-Seattle)
- Washington State Rep. Eric Pettigrew (D-Seattle)
- Washington State Rep. Dave Quall (D-Mt. Vernon/Bellingham)
- Washington State Rep. Geoff Simpson (D-King County)
- Washington State Rep. Larry Springer (D-Kirkland/Redmond)
- Washington State Rep. Dave Upthegrove (D-Southern King County)
- Washington State Rep. Brendan Williams (D-Olympia)
- King County Executive Ron Sims (D-King County)
- Fmr. Governor Gary Locke (D-Seattle)

== Washington, D.C. ==
- Council member Yvette Alexander (Ward 7)
- Council member Muriel Bowser (Ward 4)
- Council member Tommy Wells (Ward 6)
- Commissioner Darrell D. Gaston (Ward 8/ANC 8B03)

== West Virginia ==
- West Virginia Sen. Dan Foster (Kanawha County)
- West Virginia Sen. Jon Blair Hunter (Monongalia County)
- West Virginia Sen. Larry Edgell (Wetzel County)
- West Virginia Sen. Jeffrey V. Kessler (Marshall County)
- West Virginia Del. John Doyle (Jefferson County)
- West Virginia Del. Ron Fragale (Harrison County)
- West Virginia Del. Tal Hutchins (Ohio County)
- West Virginia Del. Charlene Marshall (Monongalia County)
- West Virginia Del. Clif Moore (McDowell County)
- West Virginia Del. Alex Shook (Monongalia County)
- West Virginia State Auditor Glen Gainer III
- Fmr. West Virginia Secretary of State Ken Hechler

== Wisconsin ==
- Wisconsin State Sen. Bob Jauch (D-Poplar)
- Wisconsin State Assemblymember Spencer Black (D-Madison)
- Wisconsin State Assemblymember Pedro Colón (D-Milwaukee)
- Wisconsin State Assemblymember Jason Fields (D-Milwaukee)
- Wisconsin State Assemblymember Tamara Grigsby (D-Milwaukee)
- Wisconsin State Assemblymember Steve Hilgenberg (D-Dodgeville)
- Wisconsin State Assemblymember Gordon Hintz (D-Oshkosh)
- Wisconsin State Assemblymember Cory Mason (D-Racine)
- Wisconsin State Assemblymember Joe Parisi (D-Madison)
- Wisconsin State Assemblymember Donna J. Seidel (D-Wausau)
- Wisconsin State Assemblymember Mike Sheridan (D-Janesville)
- Wisconsin State Assemblymember Christine Sinicki (D-Milwaukee)
- Wisconsin State Assemblymember Tony Staskunas (D-South Milwaukee)
- Wisconsin State Assemblymember Barbara Toles (D-Milwaukee)
- Wisconsin State Assemblymember Annette P. Williams (D-Milwaukee)
- Wisconsin State Assemblymember Josh Zepnick (D-Milwaukee)
- Fmr. Wisconsin Attorney General Peggy Lautenschlager (D-Fond du Lac)

== Wyoming ==
- Wyoming State Sen. Mike Massie (D-Laramie)
- Wyoming State Sen. Ken Decaria (D-Evanston)
- Wyoming State Rep. Debbie Hammons (D-Worland)
- Wyoming State Rep. Ross Diercks (D-Lusk)
- Wyoming State Rep. Pete Jorgensen (D-Jackson)
- Wyoming State Rep. Patrick Goggles (D-Ethete)
- Wyoming State Rep. Lori Millin (D-Cheyenne)
- Wyoming State Rep. Mary Throne (D-Cheyenne)
- Wyoming State Rep. Stan Blake (D-Green River)
- Wyoming State Rep. Marty Martin (D-Rock Springs)
- Wyoming State Rep. Jane Warren (D-Laramie)
