= Peggy Gibson =

American politician (born 1949)

Member of the South Dakota House of Representatives from the 22nd district
- In office January 2009 – January 10, 2017 Serving with Quinten Burg (2009–2011); Jim White (2011–2013); Dick Werner (2013–2017)
- Preceded by: Dale Hargens
- Succeeded by: Roger D. Chase

Personal details
- Born: February 22, 1949 (age 77) Huron, South Dakota
- Party: Democratic
- Education: Arizona State University; Northern Montana College
- Website: peggygibsonsd.com

Peggy Anne Gibson (born February 22, 1949, in Huron, South Dakota) is an American politician and a Democratic former member of the South Dakota House of Representatives representing District 22 from 2009 until 2017.

== Education ==
Gibson attended Arizona State University and earned her BA degrees in history and Spanish from Northern Montana College (now Montana State University–Northern).

== Elections ==
- 2012 With incumbent Republican Representative Jim White running for South Dakota Senate and leaving a House District 22 seat open, Gibson ran in the three-way June 5, 2012, Democratic Primary and placed first with 1,058 votes (46.3%); in the four-way November 6, 2012, General election, Gibson took the first seat with 5,299 votes (30.6%) and Republican nominee Dick Werner took the second seat ahead of Democratic nominee Dale Hargens and Republican nominee Jay Slater.
- 2006 To challenge Senate District 22 incumbent Republican Senator Tom Hansen, Gibson was unopposed for the June 6, 2006, Democratic Primary after another challenger withdrew, but lost the November 7, 2006, General election to Senator Hansen.
- 2008 When House District 22 incumbent Democratic Representative Dale Hargens ran for South Dakota Senate and left a District 22 seat open, Gibson ran in the three-way June 3, 2008, Democratic Primary and placed second with 2,145 votes (38.57%) ahead of former state Senator Ron J. Volesky; in the four-way November 4, 2008, General election incumbent Democratic Representative Quinten Burg took the first seat and Gibson took the second seat with 4,939 votes (27.53%) ahead of Republican nominees Joshua Haeder (who had run for the seat in 2006) and Cliff Hadley.
- 2010 Gibson and incumbent Representative Burg were unopposed for the June 8, 2010, Democratic Primary but in the three-way November 2, 2010, General election, Gibson took the first seat with 4,856 votes (34.71%) and Republican nominee Jim White took the second seat ahead of Representative Burg; an election recount did not change the result.
