= Jim White (politician) =

American politician

Member of the South Dakota Senate from the 22nd district
- In office January 8, 2013 – January 12, 2021
- Preceded by: Tom Hansen
- Succeeded by: David Wheeler

Member of the South Dakota House of Representatives from the 22nd district
- In office January 11, 2011 – January 8, 2013
- Preceded by: Quinten Burg
- Succeeded by: Dick Werner

Personal details
- Born: November 22, 1944 (age 81)
- Party: Republican
- Website: jimwhiteonline.com

Jim White (born November 22, 1944) is an American politician who served as a member of the South Dakota Senate for the 22nd district from 2013 to 2021. White served consecutively in the South Dakota Legislature from January 11, 2011, until January 8, 2013, in the South Dakota House of Representatives District 22 seat.

== Elections ==
- 2012 When incumbent Senate District 22 Republican Senator Tom Hansen was term limited and left the District 22 seat open, White was unopposed for the June 5, 2012 Republican Primary and won the November 6, 2012 General election with 5,196 votes (54.4%) against Democratic nominee Chris Studer.
- 2010 To challenge House District 22 incumbent Democratic Representatives Quinten Burg and Peggy Gibson, White was unopposed for the June 8, 2010 Republican Primary; in the three-way November 2, 2010 General election, Representative Gibson took the first seat and White took the second seat with 4,526 votes (32.35%) ahead of Representative Burg; an election recount did not change the result.
