= Joseph W. Summers =

American politician

Member of the Indiana House of Representatives from the 45th district
- In office January, 1977 – January, 1982 Serving with William Crawford, John Day
- Preceded by: Julia Carson
- Succeeded by: n/a

Member of the Indiana House of Representatives from the 51st district
- In office January, 1982 – January 1991 Serving with William Crawford, John Day

Member of the Indiana House of Representatives from the 99th district
- In office 1990 – June 6, 1991
- Preceded by: n/a
- Succeeded by: Vanessa Summers

Personal details
- Born: March 8, 1930 Indianapolis, Indiana, United States
- Died: June 6, 1991 (aged 61) Indianapolis, Indiana
- Party: Democratic
- Spouse: Joyce Benson
- Education: Indiana Academy of Mortuary Science; Indiana University
- Occupation: Funeral home director

Joseph W. Summers (March 8, 1930 – June 6, 1991) was a funeral director, community leader and Democrat who represented Indianapolis in the Indiana House of Representatives from 1977 until his death.

== Background ==
Born during the Great Depression, Joseph W. Summers was educated in the Indianapolis public schools. After graduating from Crispus Attucks High School (when it was the only secondary school open to African Americans in the city), he attended the Indiana Academy of Mortuary Science, and graduated with an associate degree. He then attended Indiana University and graduated. In 1948, he married Joyce Benson, who had graduated from Crispus Attucks High School that year, and would survive him by decades (dying in 2014). They had daughters Natalie and Vanessa Summers, who survived them and had children.

== Career ==
In 1962, Summers established the Summers Funeral Chapels, and became a leading local businessman, serving both African American and white families in central Indianapolis. He was a member of the local Better Business Bureau (later becoming a director), African Methodist Episcopal Church, Freemasons (Fidelity Masonic Lodge #55) and the National Association for the Advancement of Colored People, as well as county, state, and national funeral directors and morticians associations, and a board member of the Alpha Home for the Aged. His wife also became an active business owner, operating "Lucille's Flowers" for four decades.

Summers became active politically, first as a precinct committeeman in 1952, then as Democratic ward leader. He also served from 1967 until 1978 as Marion County chief deputy coroner and on the Indianapolis Board of Public Safety from 1965 to 1968.

When fellow Democrat and neighbor Julia Carson decided to run (successfully) for election to the state senate in 1976, Summers ran for her seat in 100th Indiana General Assembly, representing the then 3-member 45th district. He would win re-election multiple times (initially serving alongside fellow Democrats William Crawford and John Day in what became the 51st district following the 1980 census), including after Indiana switched to single-member districts following the 1990 census (when Summers won in the 99th district). Thus, Summers represented central Indianapolis for fifteen years, until his death in mid-1991.

Known to members of both political parties for his cordiality and accessibility, Summers rose to become chairman of the House Committee on Public Policy, Veterans Affairs and Ethics, and used his position to promote civility in legislative affairs, not only scheduling many hearings, but thwarting rancorous legislation concerning abortion and even Democratic governor Evan Bayh's proposal to strengthen legislation concerning drunk driving (as likely to lead to police harassment of civilians). He served as Assistant Minority Caucus Chair from 1978 until 1980.

== Death and legacy ==
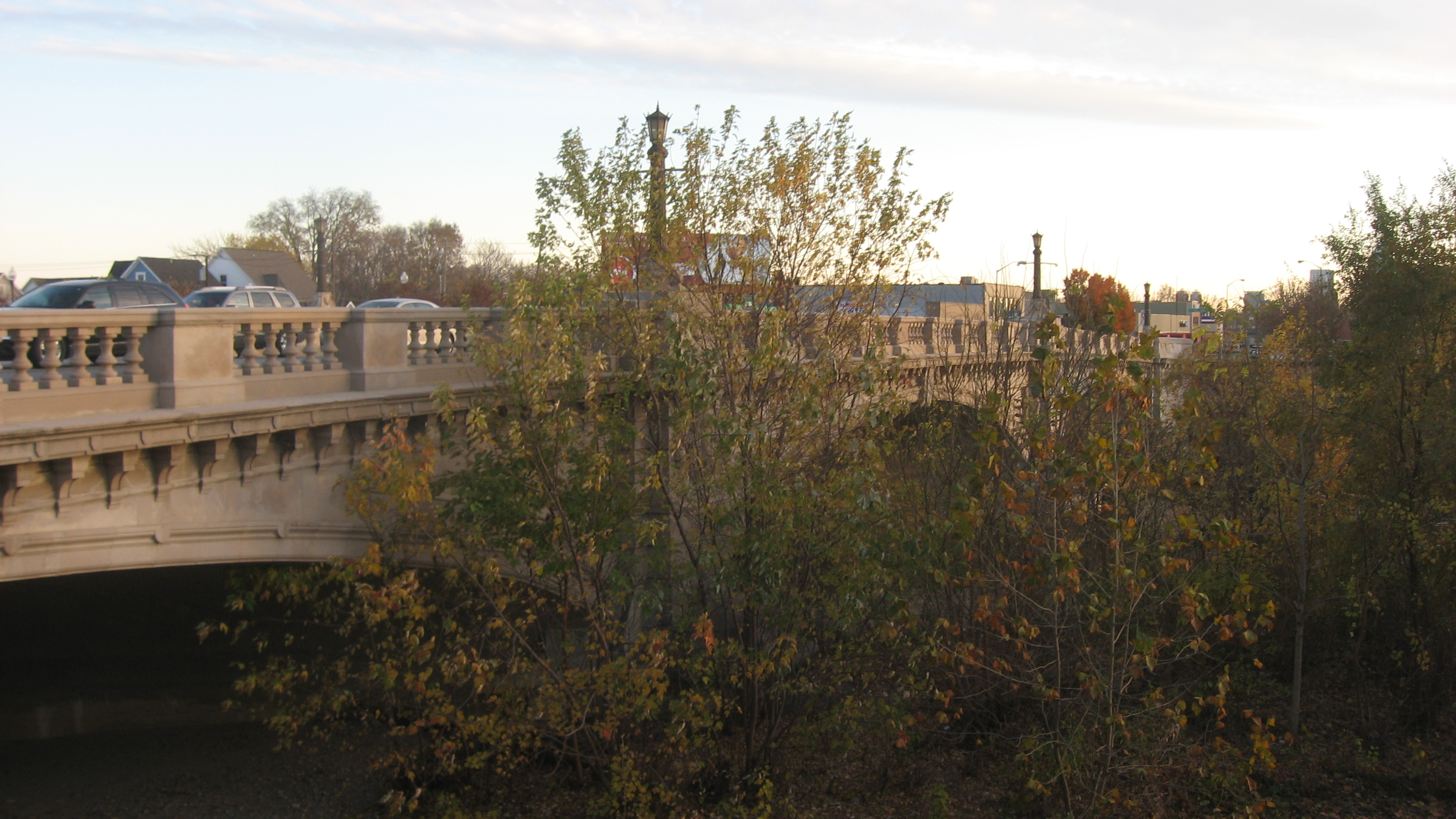
Joseph W. Summers Memorial Bridge carries Meridian Street over Fall Creek.

Summers suffered from cancer in his final years and died on June 6, 1991. His daughters continued to operate the funeral homes, then merged them with other local mortuaries in 2002 and 2016. "Lavenia & Summers" still operates funeral homes in Indianapolis.

After the City of Indianapolis refurbished an important bridge in the Indianapolis Park and Boulevard System, it was named in Summers' honor in 1991. A historical marker honoring his civic achievements dates from 1995.
