= Jane Kelly =

Jane Kelly may refer to:

- Jane Kelly (artist) (born 1956), English artist
- Jane Kelley (20th century), American politician
- Jane Kelley Adams (1852–1924), American educator
- Jane L. Kelly (born 1964), American judge
