= Bob Glanzer =

American politician (1945–2020)

Member of the South Dakota House of Representatives from the 22nd district
- In office January 10, 2017 – April 3, 2020
- Preceded by: Peggy Gibson; Dick Werner
- Succeeded by: Lynn Schneider (elect)

Personal details
- Born: Robert E. Glanzer; September 13, 1945 Huron, South Dakota, U.S.
- Died: April 3, 2020 (aged 74) Sioux Falls, South Dakota, U.S.
- Party: Republican
- Education: Tabor College (BBA)

Robert E. Glanzer (September 13, 1945 – April 3, 2020) was an American politician who served in the South Dakota House of Representatives as a member of the Republican Party from 2017 to 2020.

== Early life and education ==
Robert E. Glanzer was born on September 13, 1945, to Jacob S. Glanzer and Mattie King in Huron, South Dakota. In 1963, he graduated from James Valley Christian School in Huron and later graduated from Tabor College with Bachelor of Business Administration and a minor in physical education in 1967.

== Career ==
He taught business education classes and coached sports at Wessington Springs High School. In 1975, he became the manager of the South Dakota State Fair and retired from his banking career in 2012 after 33 years.

In 2016, he started his first political campaign for one of the twenty-second state house district's two seats and won in the general election. During his tenure as a state representative, he served on the Agriculture and Natural Resources and Education Committees and on the Select Committee on Discipline and Expulsion.

== Death ==
On August 2, 1968, he married Penny Glanzer and later had two children with her.

On March 22, 2020, he tested positive for COVID-19 and was initially treated at the Huron Regional Medical Center and was later moved to Avera McKennan Hospital in Sioux Falls during the pandemic. On April 3, 2020, he died due to the coronavirus at age 74. He was the second person in his family to die from COVID-19 complications and the third in South Dakota.

== Electoral history ==
2016 South Dakota House of Representatives 22nd district election
| Party | Candidate | Votes | % | ±% |
|---|---|---|---|---|
| Republican | Bob Glanzer | 6,106 | 36.87% | |
| Republican | Roger Chase | 4,992 | 30.14% | |
| Democratic | Joan Wollschlager | 3,159 | 19.07% | |
| Democratic | Carmen Dannenbring | 2,306 | 13.92% | |
| Total votes | | '16,563' | '100.00%' | |

2018 South Dakota House of Representatives 22nd district election
| Party | Candidate | Votes | % | ±% |
|---|---|---|---|---|
| Republican | Bob Glanzer | 5,296 | 39.63% | +2.76% |
| Republican | Roger Chase | 4,579 | 34.27% | +4.13% |
| Democratic | Tyler B. Volesky | 3,488 | 26.10% | |
| Total votes | | '13,363' | '100.00%' | |
