= John Hewson (disambiguation) =

John Hewson (born 1946) is a former Australian politician who served as leader of the Liberal Party from 1990 to 1994.

John Hewson may also refer to:

- John Hewson (artist) (1744–1821), English textile artist
- John Hewson (regicide) (died 1662), English soldier in the New Model Army and regicide of Charles I
- Jack Hewson (John G. Hewson Sr., 1924–2012), American basketball player

== See also ==
- John Howson (disambiguation)
- John Henson (disambiguation)
