= Hargens =

Hargens is a surname. Notable people with the surname include:

- Charles Hargens (1894−1997), American painter
- Dale Hargens (born 1954), American politician

== See also ==
- Harens
- Hargen, a town in Bergen, North Holland
