= Billian =

Billian is a surname. Notable people with the surname include:

- Deborah Billian, American politician
- Hans Billian (born Hans Joachim Hubert, 1918–2007), German film director, screenwriter, and producer

== See also ==
- Eusideroxylon zwageri
