= Rachael Disrud =

American politician

Member of the North Dakota House of Representatives from the 21st district
- In office December 1, 1998 – December 1, 2002
- Preceded by: Michael Callahan
- Succeeded by: Steve Zaiser

Personal details
- Party: Republican

Rachael Disrud is an American politician who served in the North Dakota House of Representatives from the 21st district from 1998 to 2002.
