= Karen Rohr =

American politician (born 1953)

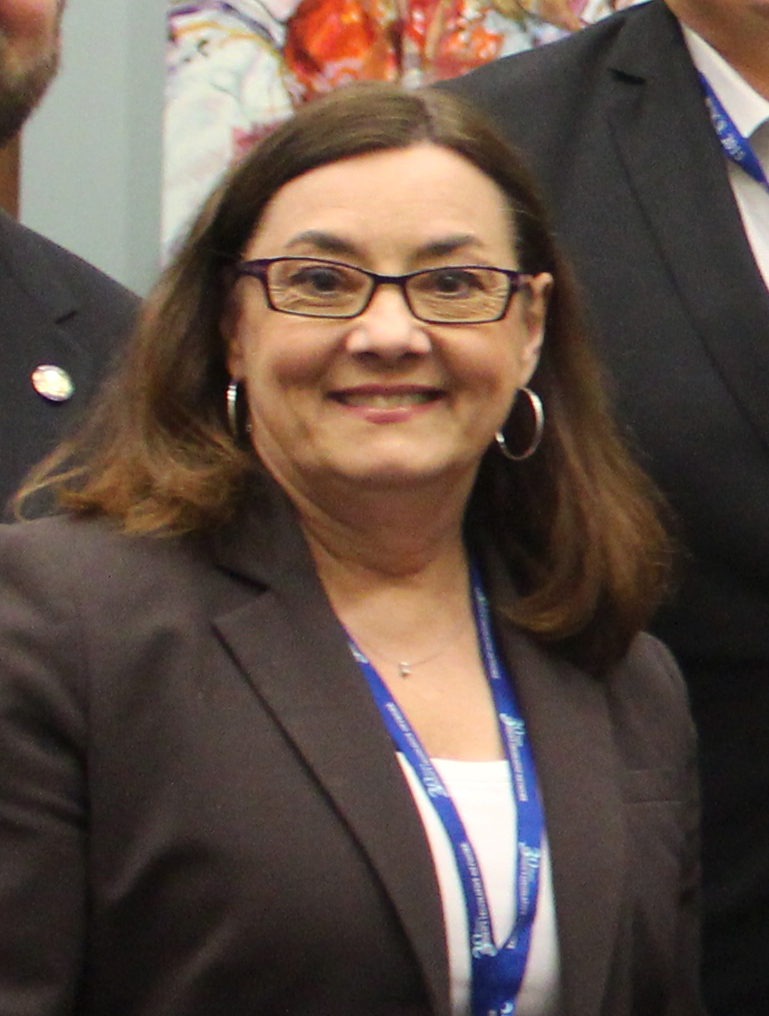
- Rohr in 2015

Member of the North Dakota House of Representatives from the 31st district
- Incumbent
- Assumed office December 1, 2010 Serving with Dawson Holle
- Preceded by: Rod Froelich
- Constituency: Grant County; Hettinger County (part); Morton County (part); Sioux County

Personal details
- Born: December 20, 1953 (age 72) Mandan, North Dakota, U.S.
- Party: Republican

Karen Rohr (born December 20, 1953) is an American politician who has served in the North Dakota House of Representatives from the 31st district since 2010.
