= Skinder =

Skinder is a surname. Notable people with the surname include:

- Carla Skinder, American politician
- Monika Skinder (born 2001), Polish cross-country skier
