= Hutz =

Hutz may refer to:

- Eugene Hütz (born 1972), a Ukrainian-American musician
- Lionel Hutz, a fictional lawyer from The Simpsons
- Sarah Hutz (born 1979), an American politician
