= Gwen Miller =

American politician and retired educator

- Official portrait, circa 1999

Chair of the Tampa City Council
- In office April 8, 2004 – March 31, 2008
- Preceded by: Linda Saul-Sena
- Succeeded by: Thomas Scott

Chair Pro Tempore of the Tampa City Council
- In office April 1, 2008 – March 31, 2011
- Preceded by: John Dingfelder
- Succeeded by: Mary Mulhern
- In office April 2, 1998 – March 31, 2004
- Preceded by: Rudy A. Fernandez
- Succeeded by: Shawn Harrison

Member of the Tampa City Council
- In office April 1, 2003 – March 31, 2011
- Preceded by: Charlie Miranda
- Succeeded by: Mike Suarez
- Constituency: district 5 (at-large)
- In office April 1, 1995 – March 31, 2003
- Preceded by: Perry Curtis Harvey Jr.
- Succeeded by: Kevin White
- Constituency: district 5

Personal details
- Party: Democratic
- Spouse: Les Miller
- Children: 4
- Profession: teacher, human relations specialist

Gwendolyn Martin Miller (née Gwendolyn Martin) is an American politician and retired educator who served as a member of the Tampa City Council. She was the first black woman to serve on the council, and the first black woman to serve as its chair. She was also the first black woman to win a citywide race in Tampa, being elected to an at-large seat for two of her four council terms.

== Early life and personal life ==
Miller was born Gwendolyn Martin. She graduated from George S. Middleton High School in 1953.

Miller married to Les Miller, a fellow politician who held office on the Tampa City Council (1991), Florida House (1992–2000), Florida Senate (2000–2006), and Hillsborough County Commission (2011–2021). The two of them have been described as a "power couple" in Tampa-area politics. They have four children together.

== Hillsborough County Public Schools career ==
For 37 years, Miller worked in Hillsborough County Public Schools. She worked both as a teacher and a specialist. She worked as an elementary school teacher from August 1957 until February 1970; and as a human relations specialist from February 1970 until June 1994.

== Tampa City Council ==
Miller held office as a member of the Tampa City Council for four terms, holding office from April 1, 1995 until March 31, 2011. The first two of her terms saw her hold the district 5 seat, representing a geographic sub-area of the city. Her latter two terms saw her hold the district 1 at-large seat, which represented the whole city.

Shortly after retiring from her career as a public school educator, Miller was elected to the council in 1995, winning election to the 5th district seat representing much of East Tampa. Her husband had briefly represented the same district in 1991 (Note: Her husband, Les Miller, had held the seat October 8, 1991–December 3, 1991. He took office after having been elected to fill a vacancy left when governor Lawton Chiles suspended Perry Curtis Harvey Jr. from the seat, but left office after Harvey was re-instated by Governor Chiles) Miller was the first black woman to serve on the council. At the time she won this election (in a March 1995 runoff election), she was 60 years old. Miller was sworn-in as a councilor soon after. In 2003, Miller successfully ran for District 1, an at-large seat on the council. She won 55% of the vote, defeating banker Curtis Stokes. This victory made her the first black woman to win a citywide race in Tampa.

Miller served as pro-tempore of the council for nearly four consecutive years (April 2, 1998 – March 31, 2004).After this, she became the first black woman to serve as council chair. She served as chair for nearly four consecutive years (April 8, 2004 – March 31, 2008), before again serving as chair pro tempore for nearly three consecutive years (April 1, 2008 – March 31, 2011).

== Subsequent work ==
Miller played a role in establishing the "Gwendolyn Miller Recreation Center" in East Tampa. The park is named for her.

== Awards and recognition ==
In 2024, Miller served as grand marshal of the city's Martin Luther King Jr. Day parade. She was the first black woman to do so.

Awards that Miller has received include:

- The National Charmettes, Inc.'s "Eunice W. Thompson Merit Award" in 1997
- USA Track & Field's "Florence Griffith Joyner Trailblazer Business Award" in 1998
- Tampa-Hillsborough Urban League's "Whitney M. Young Memorial Award" in 1998
- Hillsborough Women's County Hall of Fame inductee in 2012
