= Vanessa Summers =

American politician from Indiana

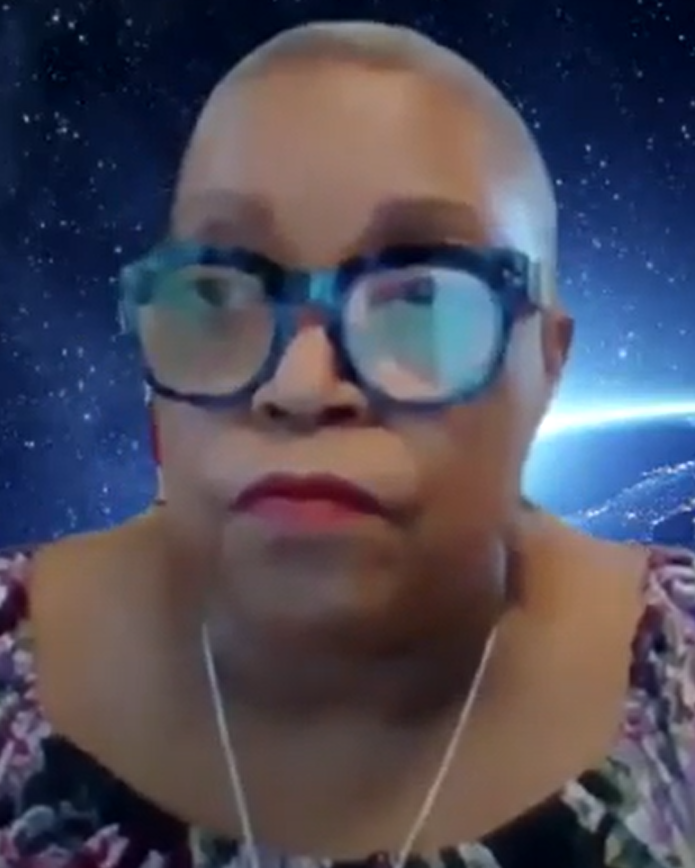
- Summers in 2020

Member of the Indiana House of Representatives from the 99th district
- Incumbent
- Assumed office June 7, 1991
- Preceded by: Joseph W. Summers

Personal details
- Born: April 24, 1958 (age 68) New York City, New York, United States
- Party: Democratic
- Education: Mid American College of Mortuary Science
- Occupation: business owner

Vanessa Joyce Summers (born April 24, 1958) is a Democratic member of the Indiana House of Representatives, representing the 99th District in her native Indianapolis since being appointed to the seat following the death of her father Del. Joseph W. Summers in 1991. Like her father, Vanessa Summers won re-election multiple times, and in 2012 became the first female as well as the first African-American to lead the Indiana House Democratic Caucus.

== Background ==
Her parents had married in 1948, after both her father Joseph W. Summers (1930–1991) and mother Joyce Benson Summers (d. 2014) had graduated from Crispus Attucks High School, when it was the only secondary school open to African Americans in Indianapolis. Vanessa Summers has a sister (Natalie), and graduated from the former St. Mary's Academy for Girls, then the only private secondary school in the city that would accept African-American pupils (it closed in 1977). Summers attended Indiana University – Purdue University Indianapolis, and in 1981 received an associate degree in mortuary science from the Indiana College of Mortuary Science.

== Career ==
In 1962, when she was an infant, her father had established the Summers Funeral Chapels, and would also serve many years as Indianapolis' deputy coroner. Meanwhile, her mother operated "Lucille's Flowers" for four decades. In 1977, when Vanessa was a teenager, her father won election as a Democrat to the state legislature (a part-time position), and would win re-election multiple times, representing the 99th district in Indianapolis until his death in 1991. Vanessa Summers and her sister worked in the family funeral home chain, which merged with other local mortuaries in 2002 and 2016, although "Lavenia & Summers" still operates funeral homes in Indianapolis.

In the Indiana legislature, which was then evenly split between Republicans and Democrats, Summers was appointed to her father's seat for the remaining eight months of the term. Following the advice of Julia Carson, a fellow Indianapolis Democrat (who had served in both houses of the Indiana legislature and would win election to the U.S. Congress), Vanessa Summers ran for election on her own behalf, won and was re-elected multiple times. She faced neither primary nor general election opponents in 2014, 2016 and 2018, and defeated Republican David T. Blank in 2010 in the overwhelmingly Democrat district, when the Republicans won a legislative majority. Summers is a member of the Indiana Black Legislative Caucus, the National Black Caucus and the Marion County Democratic party.

In addition to her legislative duties, Summers coordinates the national Diabetes Prevention Program in Indianapolis, and has also worked for the Amazing Grace Healthcare Coalition, The ARC of Indiana (a statewide advocacy group for people with intellectual disabilities and their families), and the Julian Center shelter (a domestic violence center).

== Personal life ==
Vanessa Summers is a member of the Alpha Kappa Alpha sorority, the NAACP; and the Light of the World Christian Church. Formerly married, she has a son and granddaughter.
