= John Howson =

John Howson may refer to:

- John Howson (bishop) (1557–1632), English Anglican priest and academic, bishop of Durham
- John Howson (priest, born 1816) (1816–1885), English Anglican priest and schoolmaster, dean of Chester Cathedral
- John-Michael Howson (born 1936), Australian media personality

== See also ==
- Jonny Howson (born 1988), English footballer
- John Hewson (disambiguation)
