= Sophia M. DiCaro =

American politician

Sophia DiCaro

Member of the Utah House of Representatives from the 31st district
- In office January 2015 – January 2017
- Preceded by: Larry Wiley
- Succeeded by: Elizabeth Weight

Personal details
- Party: Republican Party
- Education: University of Utah

Sophia M. DiCaro is a former Republican member of the Utah House of Representatives. She represented House District 31 for one term from January 2015 through January 2017.

== Early life and career ==
DiCaro grew up in Utah and studied at the University of Utah. She has a bachelor's degree and a Masters of Public Administration. After college she worked in the Governor's Office of Planning and Budget. She is a resident of West Valley City. DiCaro is married and has three children.

== Political career ==
DiCaro began serving in the House in January 2015. She ran for office in 2014 and beat the Democratic challenger Larry Wiley.

2014 Utah State House election District 31
Party	Candidate	Votes	%
Republican	Sophia DiCaro	2,216	52.4%
Democratic	Larry Wiley	2,012	47.6%

During the 2016 general session, DiCaro served on the following committees:

- House Health and Human Services Committee
- House Law Enforcement and Criminal Justice Committee
- Social Services Appropriations Committee

== Legislation ==
=== 2016 sponsored bills ===
Bill number	Bill title	Status
HB151	Acupuncture Licensing Board Amendments	Governor Signed - 3/23/2016
HB289	Charter School Closure Amendments	Governor Signed - 3/23/2016
HB351	Attorney General Fiscal Amendments	Governor Signed - 3/21/2016
HB397	Department of Administrative Services Revisions	House Filed - 3/10/2016
