= Elizabeth Weight =

American politician

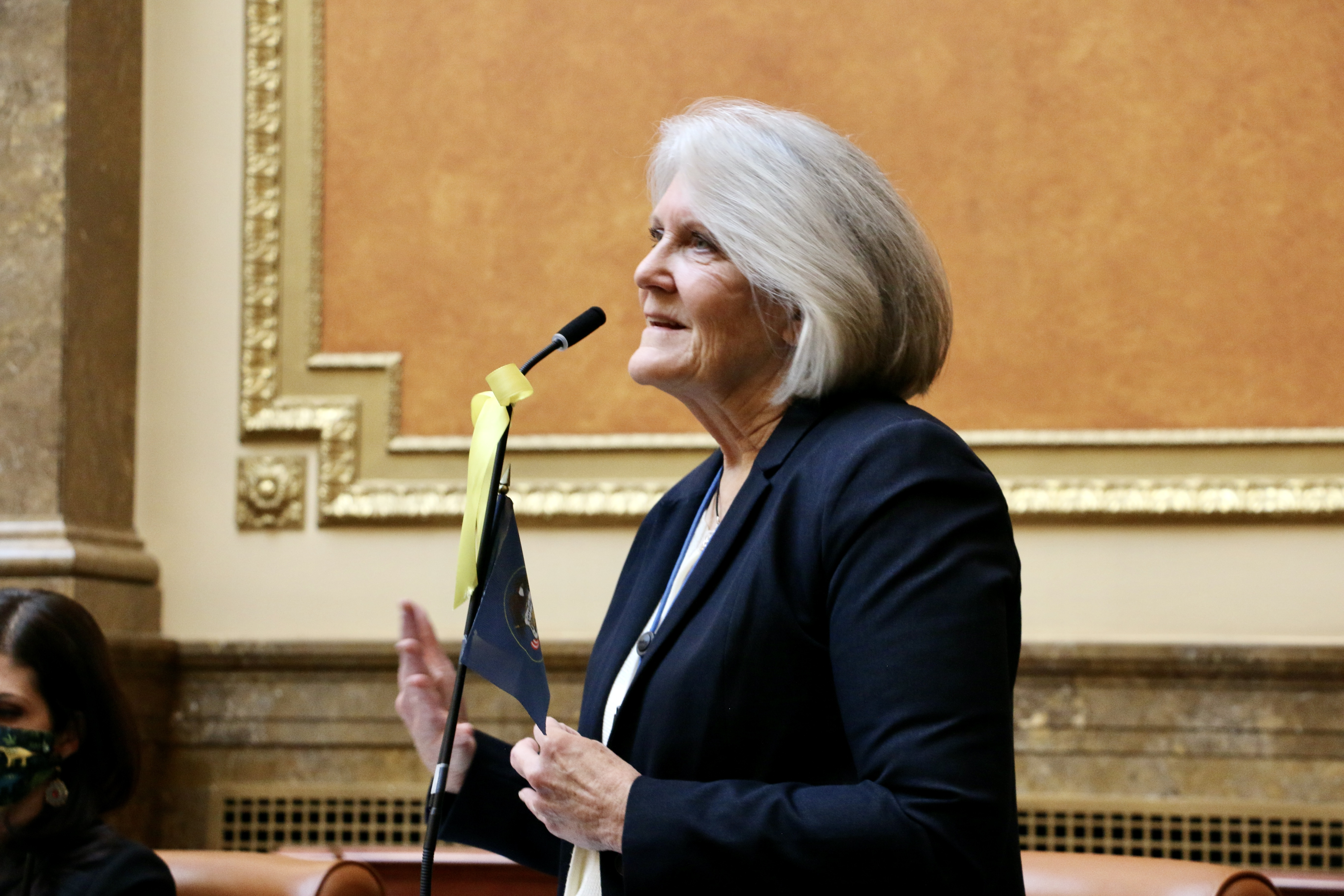

Member of the Utah House of Representatives from the 31st district
- In office January 1, 2017 – December 31, 2022
- Preceded by: Sophia M. DiCaro
- Succeeded by: Quinn Kotter (Redistricting)

Personal details
- Party: Democratic

Elizabeth Weight is a Democratic politician, who was a member of the Utah State House, representing the state's 31st house district, from 2017 through 2022.

== Early life and career ==
Weight has a bachelor's degree in Secondary Education from Utah State University, and a Master's degree in Linguistics and Bilingual Education from the University of Utah. A trombone player, Weight was at one time an instructor and owner of the Alan Weight Music Studios. From 1984 to 2016, Weight was an English Language Arts teacher and Instructor at the Granite Technical Institute in the Granite School District. For a time, Weight was president of the American Federation of Teachers in the district.

== Political career ==
Weight was first elected in 2016, defeating incumbent Republican Sophia DiCaro. Unlike the majority of the Utah legislature, who are members of the Church of Jesus Christ of Latter-day Saints, Weight is a Unitarian.

During the 2018 legislative session, Weight served on the Business, Economic Development and Labor Appropriations Subcommittee, the Law Enforcement and Criminal Justice committee, and the Political Subdivisions Committee.

Weight was reelected in November 2018 with 60.52 percent of the vote, defeating Republican Fred Johnson and United Utah Party candidate Brian L. Fabbi. In 2018, Weight was planning legislation to require safe storage of firearms. In November 2022, Republican Quinn Kotter defeated Weight by 127 votes in the newly-drawn District 26.

== Political Positions and Significant Legislation ==
=== LGBT Issues ===
In 2017, Rep. Weight sponsored legislation that would prevent parents from expelling children from their home because of the child's sexual orientation. The bill was held in committee.

=== Native American Issues ===
In 2021, Rep. Weight authored a resolution that would encourage schools to change mascots that she considers racist toward Native Americans. The bill failed to pass in committee. She signaled her intention to write a new bill "allow more education on the topic of retiring or removing Native imagery or symbols as mascots."
