= Julia Carson =

American politician (1938–2007)

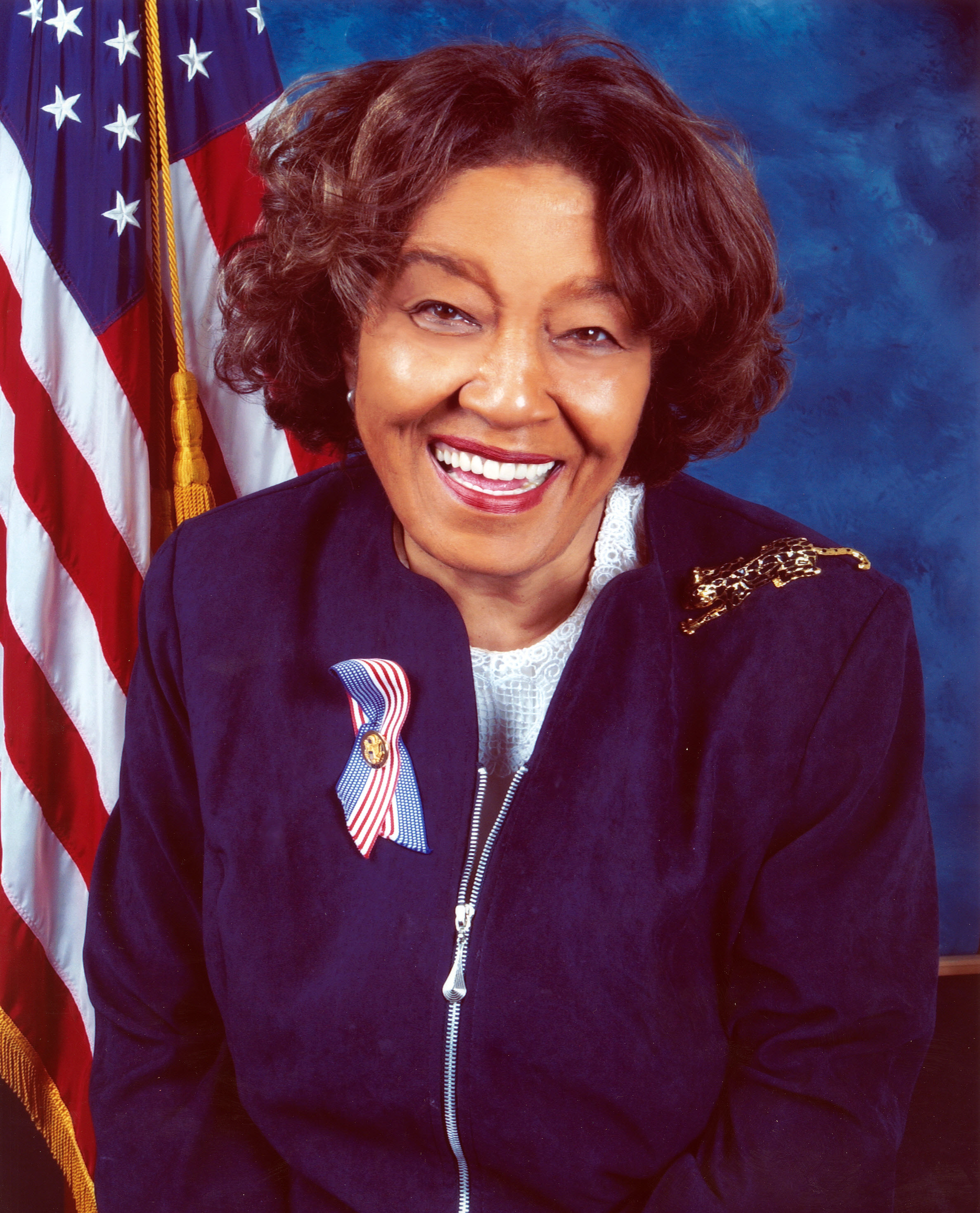

Member of the U.S. House of Representatives from Indiana
- In office January 3, 1997 – December 15, 2007
- Preceded by: Andrew Jacobs Jr.
- Succeeded by: André Carson
- Constituency: 10th district (1997–2003); 7th district (2003–2007)

Member of the Indiana Senate from the 34th district
- In office November 3, 1976 – November 30, 1990
- Preceded by: Marie Lauck
- Succeeded by: Billie Breaux

Member of the Indiana House of Representatives from the 45th district
- In office November 8, 1972 – November 3, 1976
- Preceded by: Constituency established
- Succeeded by: Joseph W. Summers

Personal details
- Born: Julia May Porter; July 8, 1938 Louisville, Kentucky, U.S.
- Died: December 15, 2007 (aged 69) Indianapolis, Indiana, U.S.
- Resting place: Crown Hill Cemetery and Arboretum, Section 78, Lot 172; 39.823165°N 86.172244°W
- Party: Democratic
- Spouse: Divorced
- Children: 2
- Relatives: André Carson (grandson)
- Education: Indiana University-Purdue University Indianapolis

Julia May Carson (née Porter; July 8, 1938 – December 15, 2007) was an American politician who served as a member of the United States House of Representatives for Indiana's 7th congressional district from 1997 until she died in 2007 (numbered as the 10th District from 1997 to 2003). Carson was the first woman and first African American to represent Indianapolis in the U.S. Congress. She was also the second African American woman elected to Congress from Indiana, after Katie Hall, and her grandson André Carson succeeded to her seat following her death.

== Early life and education ==
Carson was born in Louisville, Kentucky. Her mother, Velma V. Porter, was an unmarried teenager. Velma and Julia moved to Indianapolis, while Julia was still a girl. Velma worked as a domestic worker to support them. To help her family, Julia took on various part-time jobs, including waiting tables, delivering newspapers, and harvesting crops. She graduated from Crispus Attucks High School in 1955. She continued in part-time work while attending Martin University in Indianapolis and Indiana University – Purdue University Indianapolis. She was a member of Zeta Phi Beta sorority.

== Career ==
In 1965, while a single mother and working as a secretary at UAW Local 550, Carson was hired away by newly elected congressman Andrew Jacobs Jr., a Democrat, to do casework in his Indianapolis office. When his electoral prospects looked dim in 1972 (which turned out to be a Republican landslide), Jacobs encouraged Carson to run for the Indiana House of Representatives, which she did. She won election from the central Indianapolis district in 1972, and re-election. She served as a delegate for four years and rose to become assistant minority caucus chair. The legislature was a part-time position, and Carson also worked as the human resources director at an electric company from 1973 to 1996. She also once operated a clothing store, which failed and saddled her with debt for several years.

In 1976, at the urging of fellow Democrats, Carson arranged for prominent local businessman and fellow Democrat Joseph W. Summers to run for her house seat, as she successfully ran for the Indiana Senate. She won re-election and ultimately served in the Indiana Senate for 14 years, sitting on its finance committee and eventually holding the minority whip position before retiring in 1990. Carson and Katie Hall (a fellow Democrat but from Lake County who also won an election that year) became the first African American women to win election to the Indiana Senate; the first African American to sit in that body had been Virginia-born civil rights attorney Robert Lee Brokenburr, a Republican who had died in 1974 and who represented part of Marion County for most of the period 1941–1964.

In 1990, Carson won election as the Trustee for Center Township (downtown Indianapolis), seemingly a step down from her legislative post, but with a considerable budget and administrative responsibilities. Carson assumed responsibility for running welfare in central Indianapolis and instituted a workfare program. During Carson's six years as the Center Township Trustee, she created a $6 million surplus and erased the office's $20 million debt. The county's auditor (a Republican) noted Carson "wrestled that monster to the ground." Jacobs proclaimed Carson "not only took cheats off the welfare rolls, she sued them to get the money."

== Congressional elections ==
When Jacobs retired in 1996, Carson ran as his replacement in the 10th Congressional District, winning the Democratic Party's endorsement, 49 percent to 31 percent, despite being heavily outspent in the primary by party chairman Ann DeLaney.

In the general election, Carson faced Republican Virginia Murphy Blankenbaker, a state senator and stockbroker who, like Carson, was a grandmother with liberal views on abortion and the death penalty. Although the district was 68% white and conservative-leaning, each raised similar sums of money, but Carson won, with 53 percent of the vote versus 45 percent for Blankenbaker. Soon after that, Carson underwent double heart bypass surgery on January 4, 1997, which years later produced complications. Carson was sworn into office from her hospital bed on January 9, 1997, and could not travel to Washington, D.C., until early March.

Carson won reelection with little difficulty in 1998 and 2000. Her 2000 campaign attracted President Bill Clinton 's personal appearance, drawing thousands to the Indiana State Fairgrounds. In 2003, Carson helped win $11 million in federal funding for transportation initiatives in Indianapolis, including highway expansion, street improvements, and improved public transportation. In 2005, Carson sponsored the $40 billion Amtrak–re-authorization bill (the National Defense Rail Act), which provided for new rail lines, including high–speed rail corridors. In 2006, Carson traveled from Washington, D.C., to Indianapolis aboard Air Force One with President George W. Bush to appear at the Indiana Black Expo.

Her health (including asthma, hypertension, and diabetes) became an issue in tighter-than-expected races beginning in 2002. After Indiana lost a Congressional district following the 2000 census, her district was renumbered as the 7th District and included slightly more registered Republicans than its predecessor. In a heated campaign that led to Carson leaving the stage in protest in the final pre-election debate with Republican public affairs specialist Brose McVey, she won re-election 53 percent to 44 percent. Carson won re-election by about 11 points in 2004, defeating Republican Andrew Horning and Libertarian Barry Campbell.

Carson defeated Eric Dickerson in the 2006 election 54 percent to 46 percent, a narrow 8-point margin in a year when most incumbent Democrats skated to victory. In the same election, Democratic challengers toppled Republican incumbents in three Indiana districts much more conservative than Carson's. Carson was a member of the Congressional Black Caucus. She was one of the 31 who voted in the House not to count the electoral votes from Ohio in the 2004 presidential election. Notably Carson never lost an election throughout her entire career in both state and federal politics.

== House record ==
Carson won re-election numerous times, although redistricting added 100,000 people, many of them Republicans, to her district. She focused on issues that affected working-class Americans, many of which she experienced, and on constituent service. She won re-election rather handily during the next four elections. However, some criticized her for being somewhat unpredictable, particularly in votes for anti-terrorism bills and normal trade relations with China. Carson was one of the last representatives to support trade normalization with China in 2000 (because of its human rights record) and opposed the Iraq War resolution in 2002.

During the 105th Congress (1997–1999), Carson received posts on the Banking and Financial Services Committee (later renamed Financial Services) and the Veterans Affairs Committee and continued in those positions during the 106th and 107th Congresses. The Roudebush VA Medical Center was in her district, and she often visited recuperating veterans and could identify with many of their health problems. In the 108th Congress (2003–2005), Carson left Veterans Affairs to accept the Transportation and Infrastructure Committee assignment. Amtrak's largest repair facility was near Indianapolis, and she would sponsor Amtrak's largest reauthorization bill in 2005. Carson helped create the Indiana Mortgage and Foreclosure Hotline to counsel homeowners and potential buyers about the mortgage process, noting that although Indiana had one of the country's highest homeownership rates in 2001, it experienced a record number of foreclosures in 2004. She also regularly sponsored children's safety, health, and nutrition legislation, including comprehensive gun safety legislation (protecting children by requiring safety locks on handguns) in 1999.

Carson's legislative record included leading Congress to award Rosa Parks the Congressional Gold Medal in 1999 and 2005, allowing the civil rights icon to become the first woman to lie in state in the U.S. Capital Rotunda. Carson also cosponsored, with (Republican) Sen. Richard Lugar, the removal of bureaucratic bottlenecks on child health insurance; and commemorating author Kurt Vonnegut (H.RES.324). Other Congressional accomplishments included critical funding to revitalize Indianapolis's Fall Creek Neighborhood (which today includes some of the finest examples of reclaimed urban landscape in the U.S.). Carson also supported the new terminal for the Indianapolis International Airport, which opened on November 12, 2008. She was the first recipient of the Frank O'Bannon Award from Indiana Stonewall Democrats. Carson also co-sponsored the Equal Employment Non-Discrimination Act and was a member of the Gay, Lesbian, Bisexual, and Transgender Equality Caucus in the U.S. House led by U.S. Representative Barney Frank, D-Massachusetts.

== Illness and death ==
On September 29, 2007, the Indianapolis Star reported that Carson had been an in-patient at Indianapolis's Methodist Hospital for eight days. She was being treated for an infection in her leg near the area where a vein was removed in 1996 during double bypass heart surgery. Year-to-date, Carson had participated in 87 percent of the House votes, but had missed 42 of 77 votes during the month. Carson had battled lung cancer before. Still, it had gone into remission before being re-diagnosed during the leg vein treatment, as the Star announced on November 25. She died on December 15, at the age of 69; her death was announced by her friend, former U.S. Representative Andrew Jacobs Jr.

On December 21, Carson's casket was taken to the Indiana Statehouse in downtown Indianapolis by horse-drawn military caisson. She became the ninth Hoosier to lie in repose at the Statehouse Rotunda. An early-morning service was held in the statehouse, with remarks by Indiana Governor Mitch Daniels and Carson's grandson, Councilman André Carson. Thousands of Hoosiers paid last respects, visiting the casket and attending an evening ceremony in the Statehouse. Celebrants included Jacobs, the Reverend Jesse Jackson, Indianapolis Mayor Bart Peterson (D), U.S. Representative Brad Ellsworth (D-Ind.), U.S. Representative Baron Hill (D-Ind.), U.S. Representative Sheila Jackson Lee (D-Texas), U.S. Representative Diane Watson (D-Calif.) and former Gary, Indiana mayor Richard Hatcher. Rudolph M. Clay, the then-incumbent mayor of Gary, presented a key to the city to the Carson family.

Carson's funeral was held at Eastern Star Baptist Church on December 22. Speakers at included Governor Daniels (R), both incumbent U.S. Senators Richard Lugar (R-Ind.) and Evan Bayh (D-Ind.), former U.S. Senator Birch Bayh (D-Ind.), U.S. Representative Pete Visclosky (D-Ind.), U.S. Representative Stephanie Tubbs Jones (D-Ohio), Indiana House Speaker B. Patrick Bauer (D-South Bend), Indianapolis Mayor Peterson, radio host and Hoosier native Tavis Smiley, and Minister Louis Farrakhan. Carson was buried in Crown Hill Cemetery in Indianapolis; the graveside ceremony included a three-volley salute.

== Personal life ==
She married after graduating and had two children, Sam and Tonya. She later divorced.

== Legacy ==
During her life, Carson was named the Indianapolis Star Woman of the Year in 1974 and 1991 and was inducted into the Indiana Public Schools Hall of Fame in 2006. A commemorative bust honoring her was unveiled in the Indiana statehouse in 2014, and she was also remembered during Indiana's celebration of Women's History month in 2015. Indianapolis named its local government center to honor Carson in 1997 and its transit center to honor her in 2016. Ivy Tech Community College named its new library and community space in Indianapolis to honor Carson in 2011. Julia Carson's papers are held in the library of Indiana University in Indianapolis. Indianapolis also wanted to award landmark status to her former home.

A special election was held on March 11, 2008, to determine Carson's replacement in Congress. Although he had won his first elective office (as an Indianapolis city councilman) only weeks before Carson's death, her grandson André Carson won the election, defeating Republican state representative Jon Elrod and Libertarian Sean Shepard. André Carson won the May 2008 Democratic Primary for Congress against six opponents. U.S. Senator Barack Obama (D-Illinois) had endorsed Carson before his primary victory.

== Committees and subcommittees ==
- Committee on Financial Services (ranked 10th of 32 Democrats)
  - United States House Financial Services Subcommittee on Financial Institutions and Consumer Credit
  - United States House Financial Services Subcommittee on Housing and Community Opportunity
- Committee on Transportation & Infrastructure
  - Subcommittee on Railroads, Pipelines, and Hazardous Materials
  - Subcommittee on Highways and Transit

== Electoral history ==
Indiana's 10th congressional district: Results 1996–2000
Year	Democrat	Votes	Pct	Republican	Votes	Pct	3rd Party	Party	Votes	Pct	
1996	Julia Carson	85,965	53%	Virginia Murphy Blankenbaker	72,796	45%	Kurt St. Angelo	Libertarian	3,605	2%	*
1998	Julia Carson	69,682	58%	Gary A. Hofmeister	47,017	39%	Fred C. Peterson	Libertarian	2,719	2%	*
2000	Julia Carson	91,689	59%	Marvin B. Scott	62,233	40%	Na'Ilah Ali	Libertarian	2,780	2%	

*Write-in and minor candidate notes: In 1996, write-ins received seven votes. In 1998, Wayne J. Wohlfert received 18 votes.

Indiana's 7th congressional district: Results 2002–2006
Year	Democrat	Votes	Pct	Republican	Votes	Pct	3rd Party	Party	Votes	Pct	
2002	Julia Carson	77,478	53%	Brose A. McVey	64,379	44%	Andrew M. Horning	Libertarian	3,919	3%	*
2004	Julia Carson	121,303	54%	Andrew Horning	97,491	44%	Barry Campbell	Libertarian	4,381	2%	
2006	Julia Carson	74,750	54%	Eric Dickerson	64,304	46%					

*Write-in and minor candidate notes: In 2002, James (Jim) Kell Jeffries received 64 votes.

== See also ==
- List of African-American United States representatives
- List of members of the United States Congress who died in office (2000–present)#2000s
- Women in the United States House of Representatives

U.S. House of Representatives
Preceded by Andrew Jacobs Jr.	Member of the U.S. House of Representatives from Indiana's 10th congressional district January 3, 1997 – January 3, 2003	District eliminated in reapportionment
Preceded by Brian Kerns	Member of the U.S. House of Representatives from Indiana's 7th congressional district January 3, 2003 – December 15, 2007	Succeeded by André Carson
