= Dick Werner =

American politician

Member of the South Dakota House of Representatives from the 22nd district
- In office January 11, 2013 – January 10, 2017 Serving with Peggy Gibson
- Preceded by: Jim White
- Succeeded by: Bob Glanzer

Personal details
- Born: December 2, 1957 (age 68) Herreid, South Dakota
- Party: Republican
- Education: University of South Dakota

Richard Edward Werner (born December 2, 1957) is an American politician and a Republican former member of the South Dakota House of Representatives representing District 22 from 2013 until 2017.

== Education, Life ==
Werner graduated from the University of South Dakota. Werner is a Member of the Local Lions Chapter in Huron.

== Elections ==
- 2012 When incumbent Republican Representative Jim White ran for South Dakota Senate and left a District 22 seat open, Werner ran in the three-way June 5, 2012 Republican Primary and placed first by 1 vote with 725 votes; in the four-way November 6, 2012 General election, incumbent Democratic Representative Peggy Gibson took the first seat and Werner took the second seat with 4,344 votes (25.05%) ahead of Democratic nominee Dale Hargens and fellow Republican nominee Jay Slater.
