= Florida House =

Florida House may refer to:

- Florida House of Representatives, one of the two Chambers of the Florida Legislature
- Florida Tropical House, a beach house in Beverly Shores, Indiana.
- Florida House on Capitol Hill, often called "Florida's embassy" in Washington, D.C.
