= John Henson =

John Henson may refer to:

- John Henson (basketball) (born 1990), American basketball player
- John Henson (comedian) (born 1967), TV show host
- John Henson (politician), New Hampshire politician
- John Henson (puppeteer) (1965–2014), Muppet performer, the son of Jim Henson
