= Harens =

Harens is a surname. Notable people with the surname include:

- Dean Harens (1920–1996), American actor
- Thomas Harens (born 1954), American politician

== See also ==
- Hargens
