= Dan Forestal =

American politician (1983–2021)

Member of the Indiana House of Representatives from the 100th district
- In office November 7, 2012 – June 15, 2020
- Preceded by: John Day
- Succeeded by: Blake Johnson

Personal details
- Born: March 3, 1983 Indianapolis, Indiana
- Died: July 14, 2021 (aged 38) Indianapolis, Indiana
- Party: Democratic
- Education: Ivy Tech Community College of Indiana; Indiana University–Purdue University Indianapolis; Indiana University School of Public and Environmental Affairs

Dan Forestal (March 3, 1983 – July 14, 2021) was a Democratic member of the Indiana House of Representatives, representing the 100th District.

Forestal was born on March 3, 1983, in Indianapolis, Indiana, to Marianne Forestal. He attended Little Flower Catholic Grade School and Roncalli High School, graduating in 2001. He received an associate degree in fire science from Ivy Tech Community College of Indiana, a degree in public safety administration from Indiana University–Purdue University Indianapolis and a degree in public administration from Indiana University School of Public and Environmental Affairs. He joined the Indianapolis Fire Department ("IFD") in 2007 and served at station 25 in the historic Indianapolis neighborhood of Irvington, on the East Side.

Forestal was arrested on August 11, 2019, and charged with operating a vehicle while intoxicated, resisting law enforcement, and impersonating a public servant. Forestal died on July 14, 2021, with police opening an investigation after finding him dead at the Quality Inn Northwest on Wesleyan Road in Indianapolis. He was 38.
