= Sue Ellspermann =

American academic administrator and politician (born 1960)

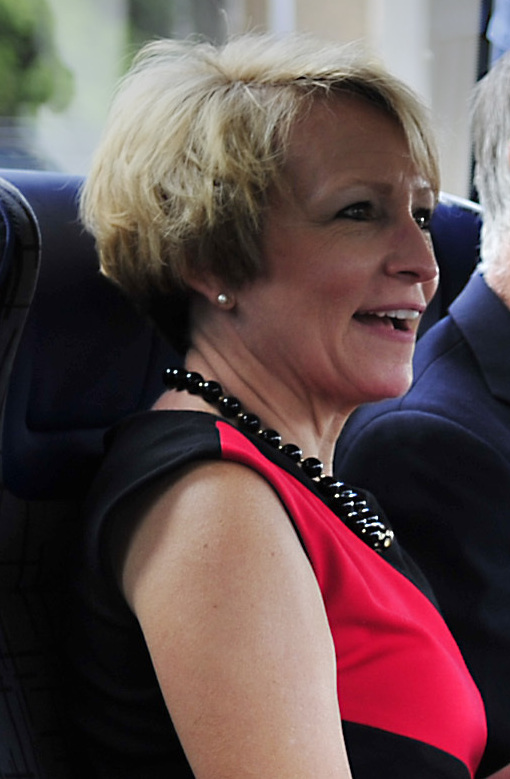
- Ellspermann in 2015

President of Ivy Tech Community College of Indiana
- In office July 1, 2016 – May 31, 2025
- Preceded by: Thomas J. Snyder
- Succeeded by: Marty Pollio

50th Lieutenant Governor of Indiana
- In office January 14, 2013 – March 2, 2016
- Governor: Mike Pence
- Preceded by: Becky Skillman
- Succeeded by: Eric Holcomb

Member of the Indiana House of Representatives from the 74th district
- In office November 16, 2010 – November 7, 2012
- Preceded by: Russell Stilwell
- Succeeded by: Lloyd Arnold

Personal details
- Born: Sue Boeglin; April 29, 1960 (age 66) Ferdinand, Indiana, U.S.
- Party: Republican
- Spouse(s): Ken Ellspermann (m. 1986; div. 2000) Jim Mehling
- Children: 4
- Education: Purdue University (BS); University of Louisville (PhD)

Academic background
- Thesis: The impact of creative thinking training and problem structuring heuristics on the formulation of ill-structured problems (1996)
- Doctoral advisor: Gerald Evans

Academic work
- Discipline: Industrial Engineering
- Institutions: University of Southern Indiana; Ivy Tech Community College of Indiana

Sue Ellspermann (née Boeglin; born April 29, 1960) is an American academic administrator and politician who served as the 50th lieutenant governor of Indiana, from 2013 to 2016. A member of the Republican Party, Ellspermann served in the Indiana House of Representatives from the 74th District from 2010 to 2012, representing Warrick, Spencer, and parts of Dubois, and Perry County, Indiana. She resigned as lieutenant governor on March 2, 2016, to become the president of Ivy Tech Community College of Indiana, a position she held from 2016 to 2025.

On May 21, 2012, Republican gubernatorial candidate Mike Pence announced Ellspermann as his running mate in the 2012 election. They defeated Democratic nominees John Gregg and Vi Simpson in the general election.

== Early life and career ==
Ellspermann was born in Ferdinand, Indiana, one of six children of Tom and Betty Boeglin. She graduated in 1978 from Forest Park High School in Ferdinand. In 1982, Ellspermann graduated from Purdue University with a Bachelor of Science in industrial engineering, and in 1996 she received a PhD from University of Louisville. Before entering state politics, Ellspermann founded the business consulting firm Ellspermann and Associates Inc. In 2006, she became the founding director of the University of Southern Indiana's Center for Applied Research. In 2012, Ellspermann became the Director of Strategic Engagement for the strategic marketing firm Transformation Team, Inc.

== Indiana House of Representatives ==
In 2010, Ellspermann ran for the Indiana House of Representatives from the 74th District. She defeated 14-year incumbent and Democratic Majority Floor Leader Russ Stilwell.

Ellspermann served one term in the Indiana House during the 2011–12 legislative session. She served on the committees for:

- Commerce, Small Business and Economic Development
- Elections and Apportionment
- Employment, Labor and Pensions (vice chair)

During the legislative session, Ellspermann was a co-sponsor of H.B. 1210, prohibiting state agencies from entering into a contract or making a grant to any entity that performs abortions or operates a facility where abortions are performed, with exceptions in cases of rape, incest, or for the life of the mother. Many organizations criticized H.B. 1210 for repealing Medicaid funding for Planned Parenthood of Indiana and for blocking funding for other health services that Planned Parenthood provides for those on Medicaid. Ellspermann also cosponsored H.B. 1007, establishing a pilot program requiring drug testing for TANF applicants, and twice voted for a statewide ban on smoking in bars and restaurants. Ellspermann was a co-sponsor of and leader in passing H.B. 1001, Indiana's right-to-work law, which prohibits employers from requiring employees to join a labor union. During a debate with other lawmakers in Evansville, she said, "Right-to-work is a legitimate strategy to help attract and grow jobs. Indiana loses out on potential job creation because some companies won't consider moving here." Ellspermann sponsored four bills during her tenure, two of which became law, including HEA 1312, expanding state regulatory authority of poultry sellers at farmers markets, and HEA 1173, changing the circumstances under which employees can file a complaint against their employer through the Indiana Occupational Safety and Health Administration. The American Conservative Union gave her an evaluation of 87%.

== Lieutenant Governor of Indiana ==
=== 2012 gubernatorial election ===
Likely running mates for U.S. Representative and Republican gubernatorial nominee Mike Pence in Indiana's 2012 gubernatorial election were rumored to include Valparaiso Mayor Jon Costas, incumbent Lieutenant Governor Becky Skillman, and Ellspermann. On May 21, 2012, Pence announced that he had picked Ellspermann as his running mate. The choice was hailed among officials and members of the Indiana Republican Party and criticized by Democratic nominee John Gregg, who called the Pence-Ellsperman ticket "the Tea Party ticket." Pence and Ellspermann were officially nominated at the Indiana Republican convention on June 10, 2012, and on November 6 won the general election with 49.6% of the vote.

=== Tenure ===
Ellspermann was sworn in as the 50th Lieutenant Governor of Indiana on January 14, 2013, succeeding two-term incumbent Becky Skillman. As lieutenant governor, Ellspermann headed the Indiana State Department of Agriculture, the Office of Energy Development, the Indiana Housing and Community Development Authority, the Office of Community and Rural Affairs and the Office of Tourism Development.

On March 2, 2016, Ellspermann resigned before the completion of her term to become President of Ivy Tech Community College of Indiana. Pence appointed Eric J. Holcomb to serve out the remainder of her term.

== Electoral history ==
=== 2010 ===
Indiana House of Representatives, 74th District, 2010
Party	Candidate	Votes	%	±%
Republican	Sue Ellspermann	11,242	52.04%	+15.44%
Democratic	Russ Stilwell (incumbent)	10,362	47.96%	−11.44%
Turnout		21,604		
Republican gain from Democratic		Swing		

=== 2012 ===
2012 Indiana gubernatorial election
Party	Candidate	Votes	%	±%
Republican	Mike Pence / Sue Ellspermann	1,264,877	49.62%	−8.22%
Democratic	John Gregg / Vi Simpson	1,183,213	46.42%	+6.38%
Libertarian	Rupert Boneham / Brad Klopfenstein	101,028	3.96%	+1.84%
No party	Donnie Harold Harris / George Fish (write-in)	34	0%	—
Margin of victory		81,664	3.20%	−14.61%
Turnout		2,549,152	57.81%	−2.08%
Republican hold		Swing		

== See also ==
- List of female lieutenant governors in the United States

Party political offices
Preceded by Becky Skillman	Republican nominee for Lieutenant Governor of Indiana; 2012	Succeeded by Eric Holcomb; Withdrew
Political offices
Preceded by Becky Skillman	Lieutenant Governor of Indiana; 2013–2016	Succeeded by Eric Holcomb
