= Joe Kroeber =

American politician

Member of the North Dakota House of Representatives from the 12th district
- In office 1999 - 2012
- Succeeded by: Alex Looysen

Personal details
- Party: North Dakota Democratic–Nonpartisan League Party
- Spouse: Bonnie
- Education: Valley City State University, North Dakota State University
- Profession: educator

Joe T. Kroeber is a North Dakota Democratic–Nonpartisan League Party member of the North Dakota House of Representatives, representing the 12th district since 1999. He previously served from 1991 through 1995.
