= Pennington Brown =

American politician

Member of the New Hampshire House of Representatives from the Rockingham 9th district
- In office 2006–2010

Personal details
- Party: Democratic

C. Pennington "Penn" Brown is a Democratic former member of the New Hampshire House of Representatives, representing the Rockingham 9th District after a special election in February 2006.
