= Ed Gruchalla =

American politician

Member of the North Dakota House of Representatives from the 45th district
- In office 2007 -

Personal details
- Born: October 2, 1947 (age 79) Jamestown, North Dakota
- Party: North Dakota Democratic-NPL Party
- Spouse: Rennae
- Children: 3
- Education: Valley City State University
- Profession: Highway patrol, sales, private investigator

Ed Gruchalla (born October 2, 1947) is a North Dakota Democratic-NPL Party member of the North Dakota House of Representatives, representing the 45th district since 2007.
