= Jeffrey Fontas =

American politician (born 1987)

Jeffrey P. Fontas

Member of the New Hampshire House of Representatives from the Hillsborough 24th district
- In office 2006-2008

Personal details
- Born: January 14, 1987 (age 39) Nashua, New Hampshire
- Party: Democratic
- Education: Northeastern University

Jeffrey P. "Jeff" Fontas (born January 14, 1987, Nashua, New Hampshire) is a Democratic former member of the New Hampshire House of Representatives, representing the 24th District from 2006 to 2008. He attended Northeastern University and later worked for Congressman Paul Hodes (D-NH).
