= Louis Pinkerton =

American politician

Member of the North Dakota House of Representatives from the 5th district
- In office 2007–2011

Personal details
- Party: North Dakota Democratic-NPL Party
- Spouse: Ruth
- Education: Texas A&M
- Profession: Veterinarian

Louis Pinkerton is a North Dakota Democratic-NPL Party politician who represented the 5th district in the North Dakota House of Representatives from 2007 to 2011.

Pinkerton was elected in 2006 finishing 1st out of 4 candidates in district 5. In 2010, Pinkerton lost re-election finishing 3rd out of 4 candidates in district 5.

In 2012, Pinkerton will run for house in District 40 with Sue Olafson. Their opponents will be Matthew Klein and Robert Frantsvog.
