= Florida House on Capitol Hill =

Information center in Washington, D.C.

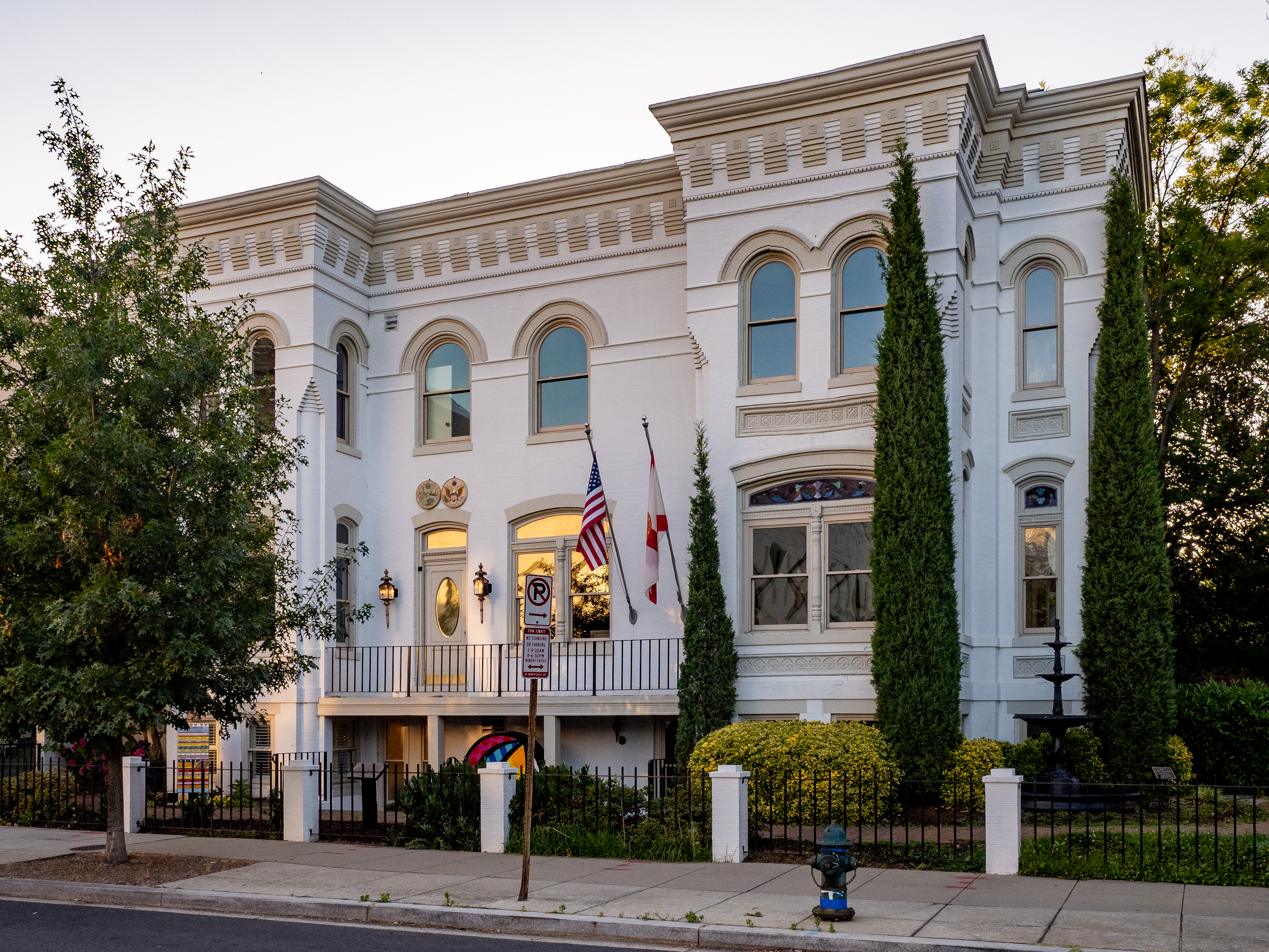
- Location: Washington, D.C.
- Address: 1 2nd St NE
- Coordinates: 38°53′24.3″N 77°0′12″W

Florida House, sometimes called "Florida's Embassy" or "The Manning House", is a privately owned education and information center located in Northeast Washington, D.C. It provides a meeting, classroom and reception space for Floridians and others when visiting the Nation's capital. Florida House is also the name of a non-profit 501(c)(3) charitable organization funded through private donations; the building is not owned by the State of Florida nor is it supported by Florida taxpayer dollars.

Florida House is located on Capitol Hill, directly behind the Supreme Court at the corner of East Capitol and Second St. NE, and offers a view of the United States Capitol.

Florida House conducts educational, cultural and award programs including the Florida Congressional Intern Seminar Series, and is visited by about 15,000 people each year. In addition to rest and relaxation (including a free glass of orange juice, Florida's official beverage), visitors find information on tours, restaurants, attractions, historic sites, shopping and directions.

== Mission ==
Florida House is a "State Embassy" on Capitol Hill in Washington, D.C. that connects, celebrates, and champions Florida to the world.

== History ==
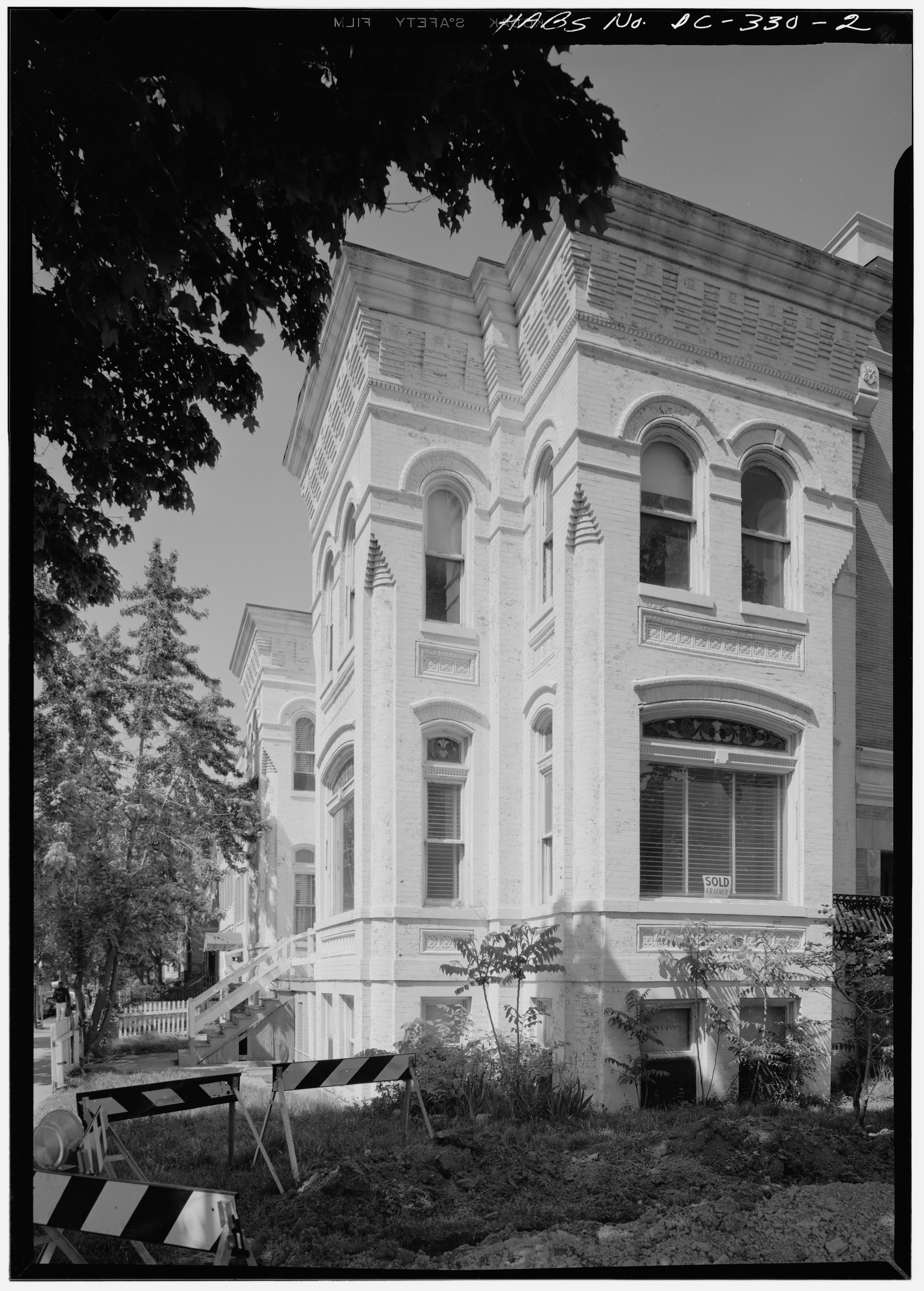

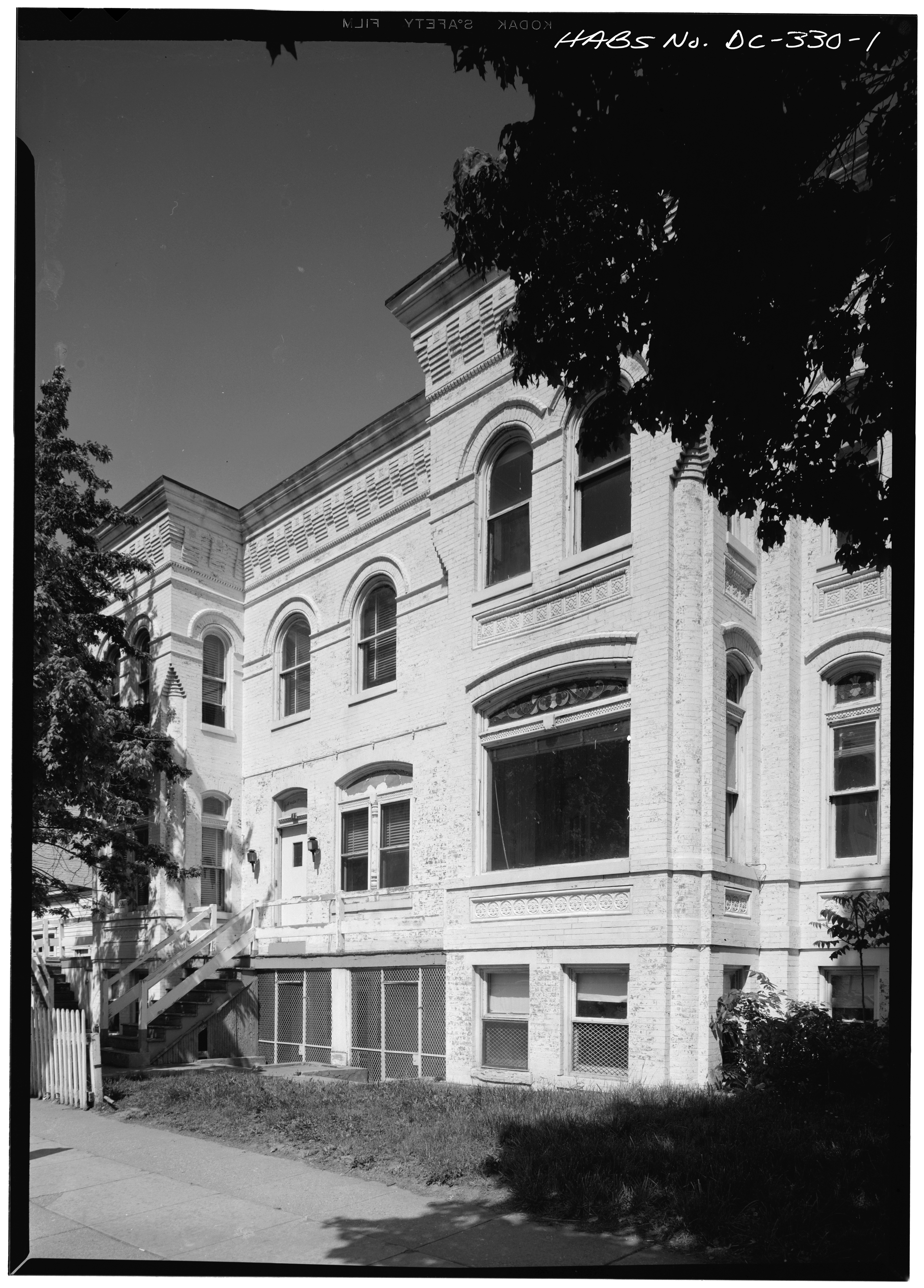

The historic residence was constructed in 1891 by architect Edwin C. Manning. It is a Victorian style row house.

The house was documented for the Historic American Buildings Survey. Rhea Chiles, the wife of then Florida U.S. Senator Lawton Chiles, saw the home and proposed it be made into a sort of embassy for Florida in Washington D.C.

Opening its doors on October 26, 1973, Florida House became the first, and remains the only, "State Embassy" in Washington D.C. Its purpose is to serve the people of the State of Florida. Florida House is an education and information center and provides meeting, classroom and reception space for Floridians visiting Washington D.C.

The Victorian-style row house that is now Florida House was built in 1891 by Edwin Manning, an architect working on the Library of Congress. By the time Rhea Chiles walked past the house in 1972, the neighborhood was unsafe, the second floor had caved in, the windows were boarded up, and homeless people were living in the basement. A "For Sale" sign stood out front. Recalling that one of her children had asked where Florida's embassy was during a tour of Embassy Row, she used that vision to raise $120,000 from friends in Florida then added $5,000 of her own money to purchase the house.

It operated on a shoestring budget for ten years. Following the collapse of the beams holding up the third floor in 1982, major structural and interior renovation was conducted. The trustees decided that the furnishings in the house would reflect that of a home in 1891. Every piece of furniture and art was a gift from a Floridian.

== Organization ==
Florida House is owned by a nonprofit foundation. The foundation is managed by a board of trustees representing a cross-section of business, cultural and philanthropic leaders of Florida. No state or federal tax dollars support the house or its operations. Funding of the house is by individual contributions from Floridians, corporate sponsors and the board of trustees. Rhea Chiles was chairman emeritus of the house until her death in 2015. According to the bylaws, the spouse of the current governor is invited to serve as honorary chairman.

Officers of the board of trustees include: chairman, senior vice chairmen made up of spouses of current or former elected officials, vice chairman, secretary and treasurer. The executive director maintains the day-to-day operations of the house and its programs. The state is divided into regions, with regional groups hosting yearly fundraisers.
