= Kimberley Casey =

American politician

Member of the New Hampshire House of Representatives from the Rockingham 11th district
- In office 2002 -

Personal details
- Born: May 2, 1955 (age 71) Saint Louis, Missouri
- Party: Democratic
- Spouse: Jackson W.
- Profession: Paralegal

Kimberley S. "Kim" Casey is a Democratic former member of the New Hampshire House of Representatives, representing the Rockingham 11th District starting in 2002.
