= Nancy Warren (politician) =

American politician

Member of the New Hampshire House of Representatives from the Strafford 1st district
- In office 2006–2008

Personal details
- Party: Democratic

Nancy Warren is a politician who was a Democratic member of the New Hampshire House of Representatives. She represented the Strafford 1st from 2006 to 2008.
