= Virginia Blankenbaker =

American politician and educator

Virginia Blankenbaker (née Murphy; born March 29, 1933) was an American politician and educator.

Born in Indianapolis, Indiana, Blankenbaker received her bachelor's degree in home economics from Purdue University and her master's degree from Butler University. She taught in Florida and Indiana. Blankenbaker also worked as a home economist for Colonial Food Stores and then was an investment broker. Blakenbaker served in the Indiana State Senate from 1981 to 1997 as a Republican.

Later, Blankenbaker ran for Mayor of Indianapolis and for the United States House of Representatives but lost both elections.
