= Larry Wiley =

American politician (born 1950)

Member of the Utah House of Representatives from the 31st district
- In office 2005–2014
- Succeeded by: Sophia DiCaro

Personal details
- Born: March 3, 1950 (age 76) Murray City, Utah
- Party: Democratic Party
- Spouse(s): Karen Wiley; five children
- Occupation: Building inspector, carpenter

Larry B. Wiley (born March 3, 1950) is a former Democratic member of the Utah State House of Representatives, who represented the 31st District from 2005 to 2014. Wiley and his wife Karen have five children.

== Early life and education ==
Wiley attended the University of Utah.

Wiley worked for E-S, United States Distilled Products from 1969 to 1972. He then worked as a carpenter for Local 184 Carpenters from 1972 to 1983. He also worked for the Christiansen Brother's Construction Company as foreman from 1975 to 1983. Wiley has been an administrator for the Salt Lake City Corporation since 1983. He is currently a building inspector as well.

== Political career ==
Wiley was elected on November 6, 2012. During 2014, he served on the House Business and Labor Committee and the House Natural Resources, Agriculture, and Environment Committee.

== 2014 sponsored legislation ==
Bill	Status
HB 46- Deferred Deposit Lending and Forum Requirements	Failed
HB 47- Deferred Desposit Loan Amendments	Failed
HB 107- Fire Code Amendments	Failed
HB 247- Court Parking Facilities	Passed, Governor signed 3/29/14
HJR 20- Joint Resolution Recognizing the Significance of the Great Salt Lake	Passed

Representative Wiley also floor sponsored SB 58.
