= Bonnie Mitchell =

American politician

Member of the New Hampshire House of Representatives from the Cheshire 7th district
- In office 2004–2010

Personal details
- Born: September 7, 1941 (age 85) Oak Hill, Ohio
- Party: Democratic
- Education: Suffolk University, Harvard University
- Profession: accounting

Bonnie Mitchell is a Democratic former member of the New Hampshire House of Representatives, representing the Cheshire 7th District from 2004 to 2010. Mitchell also participated in Hillary Clinton's 2002 Senate campaign and was the town chair of Howard Dean's 2004 presidential campaign. Her voting record shows she voted for marijuana decriminalization, legalizing same-sex marriage, abolishing the death penalty, and campaign finance reform.
