= Russ Stilwell =

American politician (born 1948)

Member of the Indiana House of Representatives from the 74th district
- In office November 6, 1996 – November 3, 2010
- Preceded by: Sally Rideout Lambert
- Succeeded by: Sue Ellspermann

Personal details
- Born: March 3, 1948 (age 78) Oakland City, Indiana
- Party: Democratic
- Spouse: Joanna
- Education: University of Southern Indiana
- Occupation: Union field director (United Mine Workers)

Russell L. "Russ" Stilwell was a Democratic member of the Indiana House of Representatives, representing the 74th District since 1996. He was Majority Floor Leader until his 2010 defeat by Sue Ellspermann.
