= Chet Dobis =

American politician (1942–2026)

Member of the Indiana House of Representatives from the 13th district
- In office 1970–2012
- Succeeded by: Sharon Negele

Personal details
- Born: August 15, 1942
- Died: May 2, 2026 (aged 83)
- Party: Democratic
- Spouse: Darlene
- Education: Indiana University, University of Wisconsin
- Occupation: Banking

Chester F. Dobis (August 15, 1942 – May 2, 2026) was an American politician who was a Democratic member of the Indiana House of Representatives, representing the 13th District from 1970 to 2012. He served as Speaker Pro Tempore. Dobis died on May 2, 2026, at the age of 83.
