= Ralph Metcalf (North Dakota politician) =

American politician (1935–2026)

Member of the North Dakota House of Representatives from the 24th district
- In office December 1, 1998 – December 1, 2012

Personal details
- Born: Ralph Edward Metcalf; June 17, 1935
- Died: March 21, 2026 (aged 90) Lisbon, North Dakota, U.S.
- Party: North Dakota Democratic-NPL Party
- Spouse: Helen
- Occupation: Farmer, manager

Ralph Edward Metcalf (June 17, 1935 – March 21, 2026) was an American politician who was a North Dakota Democratic-NPL Party member of the North Dakota House of Representatives, representing the 24th district from 1998 to 2012. He died in Lisbon, North Dakota, on March 21, 2026, at the age of 90.
