= Jesse Martineau =

American politician

Member of the New Hampshire House of Representatives Hillsborough 16th district (2006–2008) Hillsborough 42nd district (2016–2018)
- In office 2006–2008
- In office 2016–2018
- Preceded by: Dan Sullivan

Personal details
- Party: Democratic
- Education: George Washington University; Temple University Beasley School of Law

Jesse Martineau is a Democratic former member of the New Hampshire House of Representatives who represented the Hillsborough 16th district from 2006 to 2008 and the Hillsborough 42nd district from 2016 to 2018. He formerly represented Manchester Ward 9.

== Biography ==
Martineau is a product of Manchester's Catholic School system, having attended St. Anthony's Elementary School, St. Joseph's Junior High School, and Trinity High School. Upon completion of high school, Martineau attended the George Washington University in Washington, D.C., where he was a member of the Navy ROTC and graduated with a B.A. in history in 2006. After a diagnosis of multiple sclerosis ended his dream of serving as an officer in the United States Navy, Martineau returned to Manchester where he taught Physical Education and American History at his old junior high school.

In 2006, Martineau was elected to the New Hampshire General Court representing Manchester's Ward 9.

In 2008, Martineau chose not to seek reelection in order to attend the Temple University School of Law in Philadelphia, where he was a member of the Temple Law Review and President of the Temple Law Democrats. After being admitted to the New Hampshire Bar Association as well as the Massachusetts Bar Association, Martineau put his law career on hold to coach women's rugby at St. Anselm College and work in the autism program at Smyth Road School.

Martineau is the former head coach for the women's rugby at New England College in Henniker, New Hampshire, and works as an academic advisor for graduate students at Southern New Hampshire University.

On November 8, 2016, he was elected to represent Hillsborough District 42, which consists of Manchester Wards 1, 2, and 3. He sits on the House Fish and Game and Marine Resources Committee.

He is also the host of the French Canadian Legacy Podcast.
