= Kay Oppenheimer =

American politician

Member of the New Hampshire House of Representatives from the Strafford 3rd district
- In office 2006–2008

Personal details
- Party: Democratic

Kay Oppenheimer was a Democratic member of the New Hampshire House of Representatives, representing the Strafford 3rd District from 2006 to 2008. At the conclusion of the second year of the session (2008), Oppenheimer had a voting record attendance rate of 28%.
