= Mary Mulhern =

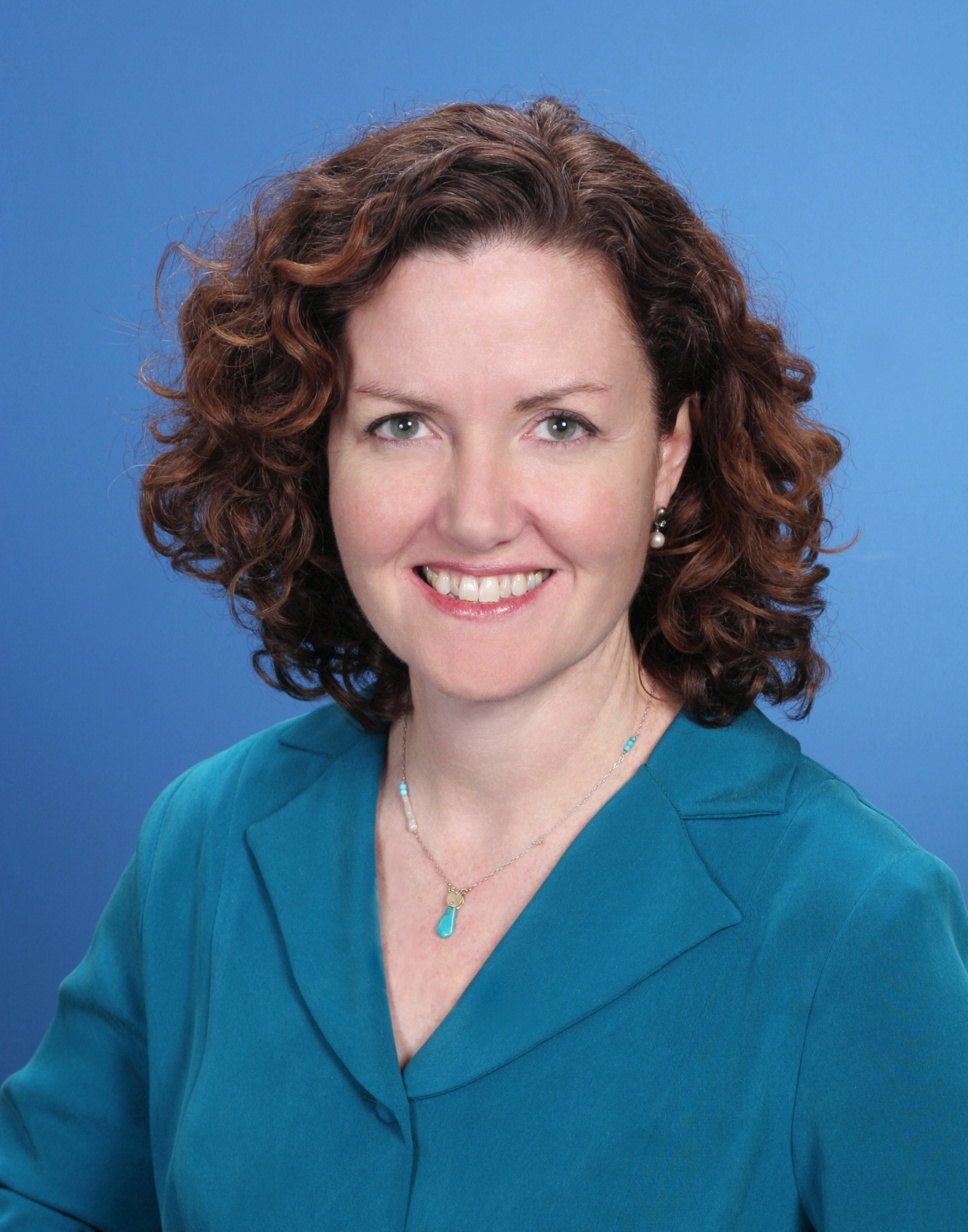

Member of the Tampa City Council from the 2nd District
- In office 2007–2011
- Preceded by: Shawn Harrison

Personal details
- Born: 1959 (age 66–67)
- Party: Democratic
- Spouse: Cameron Dilley
- Education: University of Michigan
- Profession: Art Critic, Business Owner, Journalist
- Committees: Finance Chair; Parks, Recreation & Culture Committee (Vice Chair); Community Redevelopment Agency (CRA) (Vice Chair 2008-2009)

Mary Mulhern (born 1959 in Detroit, Michigan) is a former Councilwoman of the City Council in Tampa, Florida, serving District 2. She is an artist by training.

Mulhern received her BFA from the University of Michigan in 1982. From 1985-1998 Mary was the Art Administrator for the Art Institute of Chicago. She was a business owner of Mulhern Fine Arts Management 1998-2002. She also owned Mary Mulhern and Associates a graphic design and copyrighting business.

2006 Mulhern ran for City Commission District 1 seat and lost to Rose Ferlita.

Outspent by a ratio of 5:1, Mary Mulhern defeated Republican incumbent Shawn Harrison on 6 March 2007 to win a seat on the Tampa City Council. Officially the seat is non-partisan.

Michigan Governor Jennifer Granholm is married to Mary's brother Daniel Mulhern. Mary held an event called the "Art of Politics" where David Audet Theo Wujcik and Mort Richter, husband of Tampa Museum of Art board member Sara Richter, displayed works at the fundraiser. Among those that were at the event were; Art Keeble, executive director of the Arts Council of Hillsborough County; Chuck Levin, co-founder of the Tampa Gallery of Photographic Arts; and Inkwood Books store owner Carla Jimenez.

Mary Mulhern will be running for either Hillsborough County Commissioner District 5 or Mayor of Tampa in November 2010. As of May 28, 2009, Mulhern was undecided on whether she would put her name in the mayoral race or in the county commission race against Ken Hagen to take the seat previously held by Jim Norman.

Her husband is Cameron Dilley, one of the founders of WMNF 88.5FM Community Radio.
