= John Day (Indiana politician) =

American politician from Indiana

Member of the Indiana House of Representatives from the 100th district
- In office 1996 – 2012
- Succeeded by: Dan Forestal

Personal details
- Born: John Joseph Day; August 25, 1937 (age 89) Indianapolis, Indiana
- Party: Democratic
- Spouse: Mary Jo Thomas-Day
- Education: Marian College, Indiana University
- Occupation: Educator

John Joseph Day (born August 25, 1937) is a former Democratic member of the Indiana House of Representatives, representing the 100th District from 1996 until 2012. He previously served from 1974 through 1994.
