= Tom Hansen (South Dakota politician) =

American politician

Member of the South Dakota Senate from the 22nd district
- In office 2005–2012

Member of the South Dakota House of Representatives from the 22nd district
- In office 2001–2002

Personal details
- Born: August 28, 1939 (age 87) Mansfield, South Dakota
- Party: Republican
- Spouse: Marge
- Children: two
- Education: South Dakota State University
- Profession: Nutritionist, banker

Thomas M. Hansen (born August 28, 1939) is an American former politician. He served in the South Dakota House of Representatives from 2001 to 2002 and in the Senate from 2002 to 2012.
