= Carla Skinder =

American politician

Member of the New Hampshire House of Representatives from the Sullivan 1st district
- In office 2006–2010

Personal details
- Party: Democratic

Carla M. Skinder is a Democratic former member of the New Hampshire House of Representatives. She represented the Sullivan 1st District from 2006 to 2010.
