= Sarah Hutz =

American politician

Sarah (Hutz) Simmons

Member of the New Hampshire House of Representatives from the Strafford 5th district
- In office 2006–2010

Personal details
- Born: April 14, 1979 (age 47) Winter Park, Florida, U.S.
- Party: Democratic
- Education: University of New Hampshire

Sarah A. Simmons (formerly Hutz) is a Democratic former member of the New Hampshire House of Representatives, representing Dover, New Hampshire in Strafford County's 5th District for two terms from 2006 to 2010.
