= Steve Zaiser =

American politician (1951–2026)

Member of the North Dakota House of Representatives from the 21st district
- In office 2003–2014

Personal details
- Born: September 30, 1951 Montevideo, Minnesota, U.S.
- Died: October 2, 2026 (aged 75) Fargo, North Dakota, U.S.
- Party: North Dakota Democratic-NPL Party
- Spouse: Divorced
- Education: Moorhead State University

Steve Zaiser (September 30, 1951 – October 2, 2026) was an American politician who was a North Dakota Democratic-NPL Party member of the North Dakota House of Representatives, representing the 21st district from 2003 to 2014.

== Education ==
Steve Zaiser received a BA in American Studies Organizational Development from Moorhead State University in 1977.

== Political experience ==
Zaiser had the following political experience:

- Representative, North Dakota State House, 2002–2014
- Chair, Democratic-NPL, District 21, 1998–2000
- Vice-Chair, Democratic-NPL, 1997

=== Legislative committees ===
Zaiser was a member of the following committees:

- Finance and Taxation, Member
- Political Subdivisions, Member

=== Caucuses and non-legislative committees ===
Zaiser was a member of the following committees:

- Regional Coordinator, White House Conference on Families, 1976–1980
- Devils Lake CBD Steering Committee
- Fargo-Moorhead Mosquito Abatement Committee
- Fargo-Moorhead Pedestrian Committee

== Professional experience ==
Zaiser had the following professional experience:

- Part-time Job Developer, Productive Alternatives, 2001–20??
- Executive Director, River Keepers 1990–1997
- Community Development Planner, F-M Council of Governments, 1987–1988
- Manager, Devils Lake Steam Heat Authority, 1983–1987
- Planning Director, City of Devils Lake, 1977–1982

== Death ==
Zaiser died on October 2, 2026, at the age of 75.
