= Rod Froelich =

American politician

Member of the North Dakota House of Representatives from the 31st district
- In office 1998–2010

Personal details
- Born: June 26, 1949 (age 77) McLaughlin, South Dakota
- Party: North Dakota Democratic-NPL Party
- Spouse: Kathryn
- Profession: Business owner

Rodney J. "Rod" Froelich was a North Dakota Democratic-NPL Party member of the North Dakota House of Representatives, representing the 31st district from 1998 until 2010.
