= John Henson (politician) =

American politician

Member of the New Hampshire House of Representatives from the Rockingham 13th district
- In office 2006–2010

Personal details
- Born: Portsmouth NH
- Party: Democratic

John W. Henson is a Democratic former member of the New Hampshire House of Representatives who represented the Rockingham 13th district from 2006 to 2010.
