= Deborah Billian =

American politician

Member of the New Hampshire House of Representatives from the Strafford 1st district
- In office 2006–2020

Personal details
- Party: Democratic

Deborah Billian was a Democratic member of the New Hampshire House of Representatives, representing the Strafford 1st District starting in 2006.
