= Jane Kelley =

American politician (1926–2010)

Member of the New Hampshire House of Representatives from the Rockingham 12th district
- In office 1974–1976

Member of the New Hampshire House of Representatives
- In office 1994–2004

Member of the New Hampshire House of Representatives from the Rockingham 15th district
- In office 2006–2008

Personal details
- Born: February 7, 1926 Northampton, Massachusetts, U.S.
- Died: April 20, 2010 (aged 84) Hampton, New Hampshire, U.S.
- Party: Democratic

Jane P. Kelley (February 7, 1926 – April 20, 2010) was an American Democratic politician from Hampton, New Hampshire. She served as a member of the New Hampshire House of Representatives from 1974 to 1976, 1994 to 2002, and 2006 to 2008. She represented the Rockingham 12th district from 1974 to 1976, Rockingham 22nd from 1994 to 2002, Rockingham 85th from 2002 to 2004, and Rockingham 15th from 2006 to 2008. She was elected town clerk of Hampton six times, serving in that role for 18 years.
