= Quinten Burg =

American politician (born 1948)

Member of the South Dakota House of Representatives from the 22nd district
- Incumbent
- Assumed office 2006

Personal details
- Born: December 2, 1948 (age 77) Wessington Springs, South Dakota, U.S.
- Party: Democratic
- Spouse: divorced
- Occupation: Farmer rancher

Quinten L. Burg (born 1948) is an American politician. He is a Democratic member of the South Dakota House of Representatives, representing the 22nd district since 2006. He earlier served from 1998 through 2004, and was Assistant Minority Leader from 2000 through 2004.
