= Dale Hargens =

American politician

Member of the South Dakota House of Representatives from the 22nd district
- In office 2001–2009
- Succeeded by: Peggy Gibson

Personal details
- Born: February 9, 1954 (age 72) Miller, South Dakota
- Party: Democratic
- Spouse: Susan Yost
- Occupation: Farmer

Dale Hargens was a Democratic member of the South Dakota House of Representatives, representing the 22nd district from 2001 to 2009. He was Minority Leader in his final term.
