= List of people from Wichita, Kansas =

This article is a list of notable people who were born in and/or have lived in Wichita, Kansas. Alumni of universities within the city, including athletes and coaches, that are not originally from Wichita should not be included in this list. Instead, they should be listed in the alumni list article for each university.

== Academia ==
- June Bacon-Bercey (1932–2019), meteorologist
- Robert Ballard (1942–), oceanographer
- Elizabeth Bates (1947–2003), cognitive neuroscientist, developmental psychologist
- James Earl Baumgartner (1943–2011), mathematician
- Robert Beattie, lawyer, non-fiction crime writer, professor
- James F. Crow (1916–2012), geneticist
- Juan R. Cruz (1946–), aerospace engineer
- John W. Dawson, Jr (1944–), mathematician
- Thomas Everhart, president, California Institute of Technology and chancellor, University of Illinois at Urbana-Champaign
- William Fetter (1928–2002), graphic designer, computer graphics pioneer
- Linda Flower (1944–), composition theorist, college professor
- L. Adrien Hannus (1944–), anthropologist
- Leo George Hertlein (1898–1972), paleontologist
- George W. Hoss (1824–1906), educator
- Howard W. Johnston (1913–2005), educator, founder of the Free University of Berlin
- Kenn Kaufman (1954–), author, bird expert, conservationist
- John Gamble Kirkwood (1907–1959), chemist, physicist
- Mirra Komarovsky (1905–1999), sociologist
- Lincoln LaPaz (1897–1985), astronomer
- Judith Ann Mayotte (1937–), ethicist, humanitarian
- M. Lee Pelton (1950–), university administrator
- Vernon L. Smith (1927–), economist
- Robert Whittaker (1920–1980), plant ecologist

== Arts, design, and entertainment ==
=== Architecture ===
- Charles F. McAfee (born 1932), architect, building material manufacturer, and housing activist
- Cheryl L. McAfee (born c. 1958), architect
- W. H. Weeks (1864–1936), architect

=== Cartoonists and illustrators ===
- Jerry Bittle (1949–2003), cartoonist
- Reed Crandall (1917–1982), comic book artist
- Jack Hamm (1916–1996), cartoonist
- Bob Peak (1927–1992), illustrator
- Robert C. Stanley (1918–1996), illustrator
- Tom Tomorrow (1961–), cartoonist

=== Fashion ===
- Lindsey Wixson (1994–), model

=== Film, television, and theatre ===
- Bill Allen (1962–), actor
- Kirstie Alley (1951–2022), actress
- James Stephen Donaldson (1998–), actor
- Nicholas Barton (1983–), screenwriter, director
- Annette Bening (1958–), actress
- John Born, magician
- Louise Brooks (1906–1985), actress
- Chris Buck (1960–), director, animator
- Darren E. Burrows (1966–), actor
- Christopher Connelly (1941–1988), actor
- Bruce Conner (1933–2008), experimental filmmaker, visual artist
- Al Corley (1956–), actor, singer
- Lorianne Crook (1957–), radio and TV host, producer, writer
- Julie Cypher (1964–), film director
- Ruby Dandridge (1900–1987), actress
- John Duncan (1953–), performance artist
- Tamara Feldman (1980–), actress
- Ron Foster (1930–2015), actor
- Rift Fournier (1936–2013), screenwriter, producer
- Alan Fudge (1944–2011), actor
- Jonathan Glickman (1969–), film producer
- Laurel Goodwin (1942–2022), film and TV actress
- Danford B. Greene (1928–2015), film editor
- Colton Haynes (1988–), actor
- Herb Jeffries (1913–2014), actor, singer-songwriter
- Don Johnson (1949–), actor
- Neal Jones (1960–), actor
- Richard Kassebaum (1960–2008), documentary filmmaker
- Robert Kelker-Kelly (1964–), actor
- Jeffrey L. Kimball (1943–), cinematographer
- Etta McDaniel (1890–1946), actress
- Hattie McDaniel (1895–1952), actress
- Sam McDaniel (1886–1962), actor
- Trey McIntyre (1969–), dancer, choreographer
- Vera Miles (1929–), actress
- Jeff Probst (1961–), TV talk and reality show host
- Danny Roew (1980–), film director
- Vivian Schilling (1968–), actress, novelist, screenwriter
- Natasha Rothwell (1980–), actress
- Kendall Schmidt (1990–), actor
- Cynthia Sikes (1954–), actress
- Barbara Sinatra (1926–2017), model, showgirl
- Norma Smallwood (1909–1966), Miss America 1926
- David Rees Snell (1966–), actor
- Taryn Southern (1986–), actress, comedian, singer
- Ruthelma Stevens (1903–1984), actress
- John Cameron Swayze (1906–1995), TV journalist, game show panelist, product spokesperson
- Sidney Toler (1874–1947), actor, playwright, theatre director, comic actor in Broadway theatre, portrayed detective Charlie Chan in 22 films, supporting roles in 50 films, buried in Highland Cemetery in Wichita
- Jessie E. Woods (1909–2001), stunt pilot

=== Journalism ===
- David Bloom (1963–2003), television reporter
- Cheryl Burton (1962–), news anchor
- Steve Doocy (1956–), news anchor
- Dave Evans (1962–), reporter
- Shon Gables, news anchor
- Gregg Jarrett (1955–), news anchor
- Mike Jerrick (1950–), news anchor
- Sheinelle Jones (1978–), journalist, news anchor
- Tony Laubach (1980–), storm chaser and meteorologist, journalist
- Jim Lehrer (1934–2020), journalist, news anchor
- Melissa McDermott, news anchor
- Kevin Merida (1957–), journalist, editor
- Susan Page (1951–), journalist
- Susan Peters, news anchor
- Tracy Rowlett (1942–), news anchor, sports reporter
- W. Eugene Smith (1918–1978), photojournalist

=== Literature ===
- Loren Goodman (1968–), poet, professor
- William Inge (1913–1973), novelist, playwright
- Rachel Maddux (1912-1983), author and screenwriter
- Michael McClure (1932–2020), Beat poet, playwright, novelist
- Antonya Nelson (1961–), novelist, short story writer
- Randall Parrish (1858–1923), dime novelist
- Janet Peery (1948–), novelist, short story writer
- Scott Phillips (1961–), novelist
- Charles Plymell (1935-), poet, novelist, small press publisher
- Rolf Potts (1970–), travel writer, essayist
- Deborah Raney (1955–), novelist
- Lois Ruby, novelist
- Sharon Shinn (1957–), novelist
- Jan Strnad (1950–), novelist, comic book writer
- Earl Thompson (1931–1978), novelist
- Clare Vanderpool (1965–), Newbery Medal-winning children's author
- Stephen Yenser (1941–), poet, literary critic

=== Music ===
- Hawley Ades (1908–2008), choral arranger
- Matt Alber (1975–), singer-songwriter
- Terry Allen (1943–), country singer, visual artist
- Chris Arpad (1967–), solo steel pannist
- Jay Bentley (1964–), bass guitarist
- Gage Brewer (1904–1985), guitarist, bandleader
- Freddie Brooks (1962–), blues harmonica player, singer-songwriter
- Karla Burns, opera singer, actress
- Ken Carson (1914–1994), singer
- Gaylord Carter (1905–2000), organist, composer
- Nancy Cartonio (1977–), folk musician, songwriter, producer
- Les C. Copeland (1887–1942), composer, pianist
- Annette Daniels (1961–2004), opera singer
- Martha Davis (1917–1960), singer, pianist
- Ellery Eskelin (1959–), saxophonist
- Gordon Goodwin (1954–), composer, pianist, saxophonist
- Arthur Gunn, (1997–) singer, runner up in the 18th season of American Idol, emigrated from Nepal to Wichita when he was 17
- Skinny Hightower, (1985–), jazz pianist
- Richard Joiner (1918–1999), clarinetist
- Stan Kenton (1911–1979), composer, jazz pianist
- Kidd Chris (1974–), disc jockey
- Bob Koester (1932–2021), blues and jazz record producer
- Shawn Lee (1963–), multi-instrumentalist, composer, producer
- Slats Long (1906–1964), jazz clarinetist
- Chris Mann (1982–), singer-songwriter
- Marilyn Maye (1928–), cabaret singer
- Kirke Mechem (1925–), composer
- Brian Alexander Morgan, record producer
- Rich Mullins (1955–1997), Christian music singer-songwriter
- Scott Muni (1930–2004), disc jockey
- Vernon Oxford (1941–), country music singer, fiddler, guitarist
- Pink Nasty (1982–), singer-songwriter
- Marvin Rainwater (1925–2013), singer-songwriter
- William M. Runyan (1870–1957), Christian composer who wrote "Great is Thy Faithfulness"
- Mark Shelton, heavy metal musician (Manilla Road)
- Nathaniel Clark Smith (1877–1935), bandleader, composer
- Phil Stacey (1978–), singer, finalist on the 6th season of American Idol
- André J. Thomas (1952–), composer, conductor
- Charlie Tuna (1944–2016), disc jockey, radio personality
- Joe Walsh (1947–), rock guitarist, singer-songwriter
- Johnny Western (1934–), singer-songwriter, actor, disc jockey
- XV (1985–), rapper

=== Visual fine arts ===
- Blackbear Bosin (1921–1980), painter, sculptor
- Bessie Callender (1889–1951), sculptor
- Mary Fuller (1922–2022), sculptor
- Laura Gilpin (1891–1979), photographer
- Edgar Heap of Birds (1954–), painter, sculptor
- Reva Jackman (1892–1966), painter, printmaker
- Frederick R. Koch (1933–2020), arts patron, collector, philanthropist
- John Noble (1874–1934), painter, photographer
- Tom Otterness (1952–), sculptor

== Business ==
=== Aerospace ===
- Jim Bede (1933-2015), U.S. aviation designer/developer
- Olive Ann Beech (1903–1993), U.S. aviation pioneer and businesswoman
- Walter Herschel Beech (1891–1950), U.S. aviation pioneer, industrialist
- Clyde Cessna (1879–1954), U.S. aviation pioneer, industrialist
- Emil Matthew Laird (1895-1982) U.S. aviation pioneer, industrialist, aircraft designer
- Clay Lacy (1932–), aviation entrepreneur, pilot, aerial cinematographer
- Bill Lear (1902–1978), aviation industrialist, inventor
- Roy LoPresti (1929–2002), aerospace engineer, aviation executive
- Albert Mooney (1904–1986), aircraft designer, aviation entrepreneur
- Herbert Rawdon (1904–1975), aircraft engineer
- Lloyd Stearman (1898–1975), engineer, U.S. aviation pioneer and industrialist
- Dwane L. Wallace, aircraft designer, former CEO and chairman of Cessna Aircraft

=== Other ===
- Dan (1931–) and Frank Carney (1938–2020), businessmen, founders of Pizza Hut
- Steve Case (1958–), investor, business executive
- Jesse Chisholm (1805–1868), trader
- William Coffin Coleman (1870–1957), inventor, founder of the Coleman Company
- Bill Cooper (1921–2008), business executive, Dallas civic leader
- A.A. Hyde, inventor of Mentholatum, industrialist
- Bill Koch (1940–), businessman, sailor
- Charles G. Koch (1935–), business magnate, political lobbyist
- David H. Koch (1940–2019), business magnate, political lobbyist
- Fred C. Koch (1900–1967), chemical engineer, oil refining entrepreneur
- James R. Mead (1836–1910), trader, city co-founder
- Phil Ruffin (1936–), business magnate
- Michael S. Thompson (1948–), beekeeper, landscaper
- C. Howard Wilkins, Jr. (1938–2016), Pizza Hut executive and franchisee, Republican fundraiser, and U.S. Ambassador to the Netherlands

== Crime ==
- John Callahan (1866–1936), bank robber, money launderer
- Gary Lee Davis (1944–1997), murderer, rapist
- Rose Dunn (1878–1955), outlaw
- Eric Harris (1981–1999), one of two perpetrators of the Columbine High School massacre
- Adrian Lamo (1981–2018), computer hacker, lived in Wichita for an unknown amount of time before he died
- Dennis Rader (1945–), serial killer known as "BTK"

=== Law enforcement ===
- James Earp (1841–1926), lawman, saloon keeper
- Wyatt Earp (1848–1929), lawman
- Cassius M. Hollister (1845–1884), lawman
- Bat Masterson (1853–1921), lawman, buffalo hunter, journalist
- Ed Masterson (1852–1878), lawman, buffalo hunter
- James Masterson (1855–1895), lawman, buffalo hunter
- Robert McKay (1919–1990), lawyer, investigator
- O.W. Wilson (1900–1972), police chief

== Medicine ==
- Thomas Stoltz Harvey (1912–2007), pathologist
- Hugh D. Riordan (1932–2005), psychiatrist, researcher
- George Tiller (1941–2009), physician, abortion provider

== Military ==
- Micky Axton (1919–2010), Women Airforce Service Pilots test pilot
- Erwin R. Bleckley (1894–1918), U.S. Army Air Services aviator, Medal of Honor recipient
- Tod Bunting (1958–), U.S. Air Force Major General, Adjutant General of Kansas
- Laura M. Cobb (1892–1981), World War II naval nurse
- Richard Cowan (1922–1944), soldier, Medal of Honor recipient
- Paul Frederick Foster (1889–1972), U.S. Navy Vice Admiral
- James Jabara (1923–1966), military aviator
- William McGonagle (1925–1999), U.S. Navy Captain
- Bryce Poe II (1924–2000), U.S. Air Force General
- Edwin Ramsey (1917–2013), U.S. Army Lt. Colonel
- Jesse J. Taylor (1925–1965), U.S. Navy Lt. Commander

== Politics ==
=== National ===
- Henry Justin Allen (1868–1950), U.S. Senator from Kansas, 21st Governor of Kansas
- William Augustus Ayres (1867–1952), U.S. Representative from Kansas
- Sheila Bair (1954–), Chairperson of the Federal Deposit Insurance Corporation
- James F. Battin (1925–1996), U.S. Representative from Montana
- Richard Ely Bird (1878–1955), U.S. Representative from Kansas
- Robert C. Bonner (1942–), U.S. federal judge
- Earl Browder (1891–1973), Chairman of the Communist Party USA
- Dwight Chapin (1940–), Deputy Assistant to President Richard Nixon
- Betty Dodson (1929–2020), sexologist, political activist
- Ann Dunham (1942–1995), mother of President Barack Obama
- Stanley Armour Dunham (1918–1992), maternal grandfather of President Barack Obama
- David M. Ebel (1940–), U.S. federal judge
- Ron Estes (1956–), U.S. Representative from Kansas
- Gregory Kent Frizzell (1956–), U.S. federal judge
- Robert Gates (1943–), U.S. Secretary of Defense
- L. M. Gensman (1878–1954), U.S. Representative from Oklahoma
- Dan Glickman (1944–), U.S. Representative from Kansas, U.S. Secretary of Agriculture
- Dale R. Herspring (1940–2025), political scientist, researched for a doctoral dissertation on the National People's Army and the Socialist Unity Party of Germany
- John Mills Houston (1890–1975), U.S. Representative from Kansas
- William Marion Jardine (1879–1955), U.S. Secretary of Agriculture
- Hugh S. Johnson (1881–1942), National Recovery Administration chief
- Karen R. Keesling (1946–2012), Assistant Secretary of the Air Force
- Patrick F. Kelly (1929–2007), U.S. federal judge
- Mary Elizabeth Lease (1850–1933), political activist, lecturer
- Chester I. Long (1860–1934), U.S. Senator from Kansas
- Edmond H. Madison (1865–1911), U.S. Representative from Kansas
- George McGill (1879–1963), U.S. Senator from Kansas
- Eric F. Melgren (1956–), U.S. federal judge
- Troy Newman (1966–), anti-abortion activist
- Roger Noriega (1959–), U.S. Ambassador to the OAS
- Gale Norton (1954–), U.S. Secretary of the Interior
- Mike Pompeo (1963–), U.S. Representative (2011–2017), CIA director (2017–2018) and United States Secretary of State (2018–2021) under Donald Trump
- Darrel Ray (1950–), psychologist, atheist activist
- James Reeb (1927–1965), civil rights activist, Unitarian Universalist minister
- Dale E. Saffels (1921–2002), U.S. federal judge
- Matt Schlapp (1967–), conservative political activist
- Garner E. Shriver (1912–1998), U.S. Representative from Kansas
- Horace G. Snover (1847–1924), U.S. Representative from Michigan
- Arlen Specter (1930–2012), U.S. Senator from Pennsylvania
- William Stearman (1922–2021), senior U.S. Foreign Service Officer, policy adviser
- Cheryl Sullenger (1955–), anti-abortion activist
- W. Paul Thayer (1919–2010), U.S. Deputy Secretary of Defense
- Ron Walters (1938–2010), civil rights activist, author, professor
- Jack B. Weinstein (1921–2021), U.S. federal judge
- Roy Lee Williams (1915–1989), labor union leader
- Gerald Burton Winrod (1900–1957), Nazi sympathizer, anti-Semitic political activist
- Ron Wyden (1949–), U.S. Senator from Oregon

=== State ===
- Edward F. Arn (1906–1998), 32nd Governor of Kansas
- Carol A. Beier (1958–), Kansas Supreme Court justice
- Donald Betts (1978–), Kansas state legislator
- Sydney Carlin (1944–), Kansas state legislator
- Leo Delperdang, (1962–), Kansas state legislator
- Leslie Donovan (1936–), Kansas state legislator
- Paul Dugan (1939–), 40th Lieutenant Governor of Kansas
- Jerry Elliott (1936–2010), Kansas Court of Appeals judge
- Oletha Faust-Goudeau, Kansas state legislator
- Gail Finney (1959–2022), Kansas state legislator
- Kent Frizzell (1929–2016), Kansas Attorney General
- U. L. Gooch (1923–2021), Kansas state legislator
- Harry L. Gordon (1860–1921), Lieutenant Governor of Ohio
- Raj Goyle (1975–), Kansas politician
- Phil Hermanson (1965–), Kansas state legislator
- Donald Hollowell (1917–2004), Georgia civil rights lawyer
- Bonnie Huy (1935–2013), Kansas state legislator
- Dan Kerschen (1952–), Kansas state legislator
- Lorenzo D. Lewelling (1846–1900), 12th Governor of Kansas
- Tom Malone (1953–), Kansas Court of Appeals judge
- Vern Miller (1928–2021), Kansas Attorney General
- John E. Moore (1943–), 65th Lieutenant Governor of Kansas
- Elaine Nekritz (1957–), Illinois state legislator
- Leslie Osterman (1947–), State Representative from Wichita since 2011
- Mark Parkinson (1957–), 45th Governor of Kansas
- Loren Parks (1926–2023), Oregon political activist
- David L. Payne (1836–1884), leader of the "Boomer Army" to settle Oklahoma
- Mike Petersen (1960–), Kansas state legislator
- Jo Ann Pottorff, Kansas state legislator
- John Rankin Rogers (1838–1901), 3rd Governor of Washington
- Tom Sawyer (1958–), Kansas state legislator
- Jean Schodorf (1950–), Kansas state legislator
- William E. Stanley (1844–1910), 15th Governor of Kansas
- Sara Steelman (1946–), Pennsylvania state legislator
- David Stras (1974–), Minnesota Supreme Court Justice
- Gene Suellentrop (1952–), Kansas state legislator
- Dale Swenson (1957–), State Representative from Wichita, 2001–2011
- Ponka-We Victors (1981–), Kansas state legislator
- Susan Wagle (1953–), Kansas state legislator
- Jim Ward (1957–), Kansas state legislator
- Vincent Wetta (1945–), Kansas state legislator

== Religion ==
- Bruce P. Blake, United Methodist Church bishop
- Leo Christopher Byrne (1908–1974), Roman Catholic Church archbishop
- Carl A. Kemme (1960–), Roman Catholic Church bishop
- Thomas Olmsted (1947–), Roman Catholic Church bishop
- Michael Sheehan (1939–), Roman Catholic Church archbishop
- Richard B. Wilke, United Methodist Church bishop
- Mrinalini Mata (1931–2017), President of Self-Realization Fellowship/ Yogoda Satsanga Society of India

== Sports ==
=== American football ===
- David Arkin (1987–), Dallas Cowboys offensive tackle
- Tony Barker (1968–), NFL linebacker
- Blake Bell (1991–), tight end
- Mark Bell (1957–), NFL defensive end
- Mike Bell (1957–), Kansas City Chiefs defensive end
- Russ Bolinger (1954–), NFL offensive lineman
- Arthur Brown (1990–), NFL linebacker
- Bryce Brown (1991–), NFL running back
- Don Calhoun (1952–), NFL running back
- Russ Campbell (1969–), tight end
- Wendell Davis (1973–), cornerback, coach
- Mark Duckens (1965–), NFL defensive end, tackle
- Ron Faurot (1962–), New York Jets defensive end
- B. J. Finney (1991–), guard
- Ted Gilmore (1967–), wide receivers coach
- Kelly Gregg (1976–), NFL nose tackle
- Bill Hachten (1924–2018), guard
- Breece Hall (2001–), running back
- Chris Harper (1989–), wide receiver
- Davontae Harris (1995–), cornerback
- Joe Hastings (1987–), wide receiver
- Doug Hoppock (1960–), offensive lineman
- Randy Jackson (1948–2010), running back
- Allen Lyday (1960–), NFL defensive back
- Elbert Mack (1986–), cornerback
- Bruce McCray (1963–), Chicago Bears defensive back
- Brian Moorman (1976–), punter
- Richard Osborne (1953–), tight end
- Lawrence Pete (1966–), Detroit Lions nose tackle
- Ed Philpott (1945–), linebacker
- David Rader (1957–), quarterback, coach
- Joseph Randle (1991–), running back
- Ray Romero (1927–), guard
- Barry Sanders (1968–), Detroit Lions running back, Pro Football Hall of Fame inductee
- Gale Sayers (1943–2020), Chicago Bears running back, Pro Football Hall of Fame inductee
- Ryan Schraeder (1988–), offensive tackle
- Linwood Sexton (1926–2017), halfback
- Dreamius Smith (1992–), running back
- Jeff Smith (1962–), running back
- Laverne Smith (1954–), running back
- Sid Smith (1948–), offensive lineman
- Rashad Washington (1980–), safety
- George Whitfield, Jr. (1977–), quarterback
- Kamerion Wimbley (1983–), NFL defensive end

=== Baseball ===
- Melba Alspaugh (1925–1983), All-American Girls Professional Baseball League outfielder
- Travis Banwart (1986–), pitcher
- Jeff Berblinger (1970–), second baseman
- Fritz Brickell (1935–1965), MLB shortstop
- Greg Brummett (1967–), starting pitcher
- Clay Christiansen (1958–), pitcher
- Craig Dingman (1974–), relief pitcher
- Darren Dreifort (1972–), Los Angeles Dodgers pitcher
- Jeff Farnsworth (1975–), Detroit Tigers pitcher
- Kyle Farnsworth (1976–), MLB relief pitcher
- Gail Henley (1928–), outfielder
- John Holland (1910–1979), catcher, team manager
- Rod Kanehl (1934–2004), MLB infielder
- Don Lock (1936–2017), center fielder
- Ike McAuley (1891–1928), shortstop
- Larry McWilliams (1954–), pitcher
- Dayton Moore (1967–), manager
- Gaylen Pitts (1946–), infielder, manager, coach
- Ronn Reynolds (1958–), catcher
- Jeff Richardson (1963–), pitcher
- Nate Robertson (1977–), MLB pitcher
- Roger Slagle (1953–), pitcher
- Daryl Spencer (1928–2017), MLB utility infielder
- Danny Thompson (1947–1976), shortstop
- Bob Thurman (1917–1998), outfielder, pitcher, scout
- Logan Watkins (1989–), second baseman
- Art Weaver (1879–1917), catcher
- Duane Wilson (1934–2021), pitcher

=== Basketball ===
- Tiffany Bias (1992–), guard
- C. J. Bruton (1975–), pro basketball player
- Antoine Carr (1961–), NBA power forward, center
- Tim Carter (1956–), coach
- Gradey Dick (2003–), NBA Forward
- Greg Dreiling (1962–), NBA center, scout
- Perry Ellis (1993–), power forward
- Maurice Evans (1978–), NBA shooting guard, small forward
- Taj Gray (1984–), University of Oklahoma basketball player
- Adrian Griffin (1974–), NBA guard, small forward
- Cleo Littleton (1932–), forward
- Riney Lochmann (1944–), small forward
- Brian Martin (1962–), center, power forward
- Grant Sherfield (born 1999), basketball player in the Israeli Basketball Premier League
- Dave Stallworth (1941–), center, power forward
- Darnell Valentine (1959–), NBA point guard and 1980 Olympics
- Dean Wade (1996–), power forward
- Lynette Woodard (1959–), 1984 Olympic U.S. basketball player, Harlem Globetrotter, WNBA guard; Basketball Hall of Fame inductee
- Steve Woodberry (1971–), coach
- Korleone Young (1978–), small forward

=== Combat sports ===
- Tim Elliott (1986–), mixed martial artist, UFC fighter, former Titan FC flyweight champion, winner of 24th season of The Ultimate Fighter
- Nico Hernandez (1996–), boxer, 2016 Olympic bronze medalist (light flyweight)
- Marcio Navarro (1978–), Brazilian kickboxer and mixed martial artist that lives and trains in Wichita, former ISKA Oriental Rules Kickboxing Light Middleweight Champion

=== Golf ===
- Judy Bell (1936–), golfer
- Grier Jones (1946–), golfer, coach
- Monty Kaser (1941–2009), golfer
- Katherine Kirk (1982–), golfer
- Chez Reavie (1981–), golfer
- Tom Shaw (1938–), golfer

=== Racing ===
- Kent Howerton (1954–), motocross racer
- Rick Mears (1951–), race car driver, 4-time winner of Indy 500
- Roger Mears (1947–), off-road driver
- A.J. Shepherd (1926–2005), race car driver
- Ray Weishaar (1890–1924), motorcycle racer
- Jeff Wood (1957–), race car driver

=== Soccer ===
- Maycee Bell (2000–), defender
- Scott Budnick (1971–), goalkeeper and coach
- Braeden Cloutier (1974–), forward, midfielder, and coach
- Caroline Kastor (1991–), forward
- Chris Lemons (1979–), midfielder
- Jamal Sutton (1982–), forward

=== Tennis ===
- Dawn Buth (1976–), tennis player, coach
- Tara Snyder (1977–), tennis player
- Katie Swan (1999–), tennis player
- Nicholas Taylor (1979–), wheelchair tennis player

=== Track and field ===
- Oliver Bradwell (1992–), sprinter
- JaCorian Duffield (1992–), high jumper
- Jim Ryun (1947–), Summer Olympic silver medalist in the 1500 meters in the 1968 Summer Olympics, U.S. Representative from Kansas

=== Olympians ===
- Caroline Bruce (1986–), Swimming, 2004 Summer
- Marc Larimer (1890–1919), Fencing, 1912 Summer
- Clarence Pinkston (1900–1961), Diving, 1920 and 1924 Summer
- Kelsey Stewart (1994–), Softball, 2020 Summer
- Marc Waldie (1955–), Volleyball, 1984 Summer

=== Other ===
- Jonathan Coachman (1973–), sports anchor
- Sam Farha (1959–), professional poker player
- Aaron Goldsmith (1983–), announcer for Seattle Mariners, Fox Sports 1
- Willis L. Hartman (1890–1978), polo player
- Conrad Holt (1993–), chess grandmaster
- Tony LeVier (1913–1998), air racer, test pilot
- Angel Medina (1970–), pro wrestler
- Scott Moninger (1966–), cyclist
- Peter Ramondetta (1982–), skateboarder

== Other ==
- Jimmy Donaldson (MrBeast) (1998–), YouTuber
- Kerri Rawson (1978–), born in Wichita; victim's rights activist and daughter of serial killer Dennis Rader. She wrote two books about her father's crimes and appeared on the Netflix show My Father, the BTK Killer.
- Emily Schunk (Emiru) (1998–), Twitch streamer

== Fictional ==
- Dennis the Menace, comic strip character
- Ted Lasso, college football coach-turned manager of an English Premier League soccer club

== See also ==
- List of lists of people from Kansas
- List of Friends University people
- List of Wichita State University people
