= Elizabeth Bishop (disambiguation) =

Elizabeth Bishop (1911–1979) was an American poet and short-story writer.

Elizabeth Bishop may also refer to:

- Elizabeth Bishop (Burns) (1785–1817), daughter of the poet Robert Burns
- Elizabeth Bishop (politician) (born 1943), American politician from Kansas
- Elizabeth Bishop (mezzo-soprano), American operatic mezzo-soprano
- Elizabeth Bishop (Fringe), a minor character in the TV series Fringe
