= Henry Helgerson =

American politician

Member of the Kansas House of Representatives from the 83rd district
- Incumbent
- Assumed office January 11, 2016
- Preceded by: Carolyn Bridges

Member of the Kansas Senate from the 28th district
- In office December 8, 2003 – January 10, 2005
- Preceded by: Paul Feleciano
- Succeeded by: Mike Peterson

Member of the Kansas House of Representatives from the 86th district
- In office January 10, 1983 – January 8, 2001
- Preceded by: Eric Yost
- Succeeded by: Judith Loganbill

Personal details
- Born: January 12, 1952 (age 74) Wichita, Kansas, U.S.
- Party: Democratic
- Spouse: Nicholi Flynn
- Education: Rockhurst College (BA); Harvard University (MPA)
- Profession: Business

Henry M. Helgerson, Jr. (born January 12, 1952) is an American politician. He has served as a Democratic member for the 83rd district in the Kansas House of Representatives since 2016. He previously served in the House from 1983 to 2001 (86th district) and in the Kansas Senate from 2003 to 2004 (28th district).
