= Robert Bruce Madden =

American politician

Robert Madden

Member of the Kansas Senate from the 28th district
- In office 1973–1976
- Succeeded by: Paul Feleciano

Member of the Kansas House of Representatives from the 85th district
- In office 1967–1972

Personal details
- Born: November 22, 1944 (age 81) Norfolk, Virginia, U.S.
- Party: Democratic

Robert Bruce Madden (born November 22, 1944) is an American former politician who served in the Kansas state legislature from 1967 to 1976.

Madden was born in Norfolk, Virginia. During the Vietnam War, Madden served as a lieutenant in the U.S. Army. After returning to the U.S., he ran for the Kansas House of Representatives in 1966. He was re-elected twice to his House seat. In 1972, redistricting created a favorable seat for Madden to ascend to the Kansas Senate in the 28th district, and he successfully ran for that seat, while recruiting Paul Feleciano to run for the Kansas House. Madden served one term in the Kansas Senate, leaving in 1976 and being replaced by Feleciano. During his time in the legislature, he passed legislation reforming the prison system.

After his time in the state senate, Madden worked as an investment banker. He moved to Arizona and operated a real estate company until his retirement in 2008. After retirement, Madden volunteered with the Veterans of Foreign Wars and the Boy Scouts of America.
