= Roger Elliott =

Roger Elliott may refer to:

- Roger Elliott (governor) (1665–1714), governor of Gibraltar
- Sir Roger Elliott (physicist) (1928–2018), British theoretical physicist
- Roger Elliott (politician) (1949–2021), American politician and member of the Kansas House of Representatives

== See also ==
- Roger Dyas-Elliott, political candidate
- Elliot Rodger (1991–2014), perpetrator of the 2014 Isla Vista killings
- Roger Elliot (disambiguation)
