= 1998 United States Senate election in Kansas =

- November 3, 1998
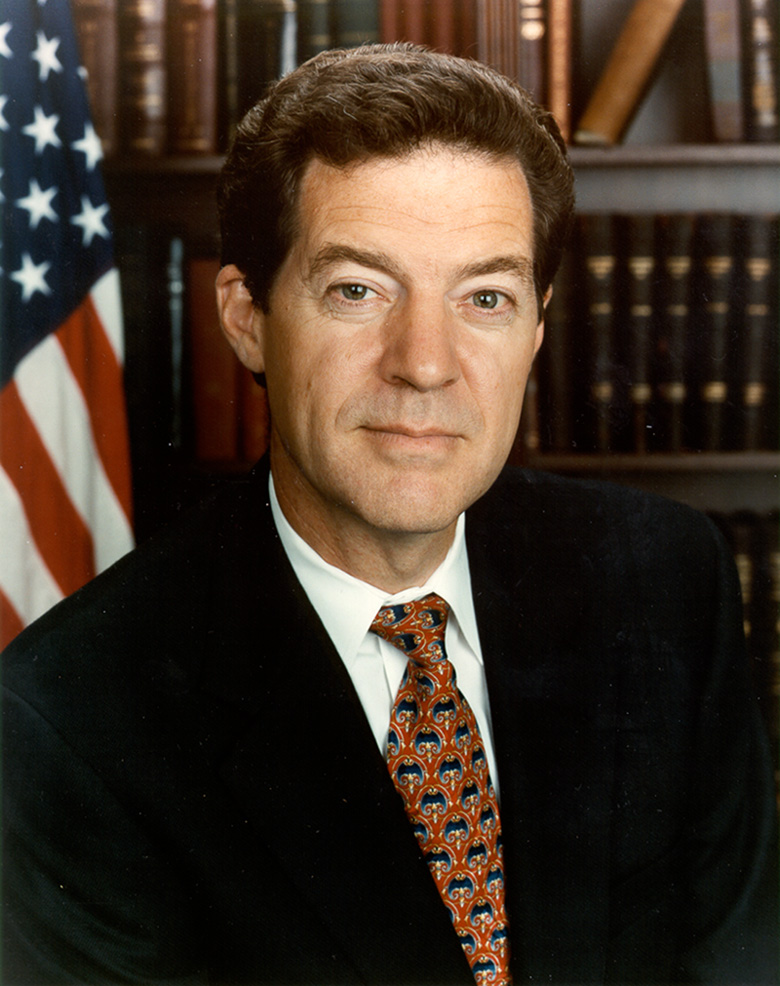

| Nominee | Sam Brownback | Paul Feleciano |
| Party | Republican | Democratic |
| Popular vote | 474,639 | 229,718 |
| Percentage | 65.27% | 31.59% |
- County results Brownback: 50–60% 60–70% 70–80% 80–90% Feleciano: 50–60%
U.S. senator before election
Sam Brownback
Republican
Elected U.S. Senator
Sam Brownback
Republican

The 1998 United States Senate election in Kansas was held November 3, 1998. Republican incumbent Sam Brownback was re-elected to a second term in office over Democratic state senator Paul Feleciano. Brownback was first elected in a special election held in 1996, when then-Senator Bob Dole resigned to campaign for president.

== Republican primary ==
=== Candidates ===
- Sam Brownback, incumbent U.S. senator since 1996

=== Results ===
Republican Party primary results
| Party | Candidate | Votes | % |
|---|---|---|---|
| Republican | Sam Brownback (incumbent) | 255,747 | 100.00% |
| Total votes | | 255,747 | 100.00% |

== Democratic primary ==
=== Candidates ===
- Todd Covault
- Paul Feleciano, state senator from Wichita and 1990 nominee for Insurance Commissioner

=== Results ===
Democratic primary results
| Party | Candidate | Votes | % |
|---|---|---|---|
| Democratic | Paul Feleciano | 58,097 | 58.73% |
| Democratic | Todd Covault | 40,825 | 41.27% |
| Total votes | | 98,922 | 100.00% |

== General election ==
=== Candidates ===
- Alvin Bauman (Reform)
- Sam Brownback, incumbent U.S. senator since 1996 (Republican)
- Paul Feleciano, state senator from Wichita (Democratic)
- Tom Oyler (Libertarian)

=== Polling ===
| Poll source | Date(s) administered | Sample size (Note: Key: A – all adults RV – registered voters LV – likely voters V – unclear) | Margin of error | Sam Brownback (R) | Paul Feleciano Jr. (D) | Other / undecided (Note: Calculated by taking the difference of 100% and all other candidates combined.) |
|---|---|---|---|---|---|---|
| SurveyUSA | October 28, 1998 | 500 | — | 66% | 31% | 3% |
| Mason-Dixon Polling & Strategy | July 6–8, 1998 | 804 (LV) | ± 3.5% | 56% | 26% | 16% |

=== Results ===
General election results
| Party | Candidate | Votes | % | ±% |
|---|---|---|---|---|
| Republican | Sam Brownback (Incumbent) | 474,639 | 65.27% | +11.35% |
| Democratic | Paul Feleciano, Jr. | 229,718 | 31.59% | −11.74% |
| Libertarian | Tom Oyler | 11,545 | 1.59% | |
| Reform | Alvin Bauman | 11,334 | 1.56% | −1.20% |
| Majority | | 244,921 | 33.68% | +23.10% |
| Turnout | | 727,236 | | |
| Republican hold | | Swing | | |

== See also ==
- 1998 United States Senate elections
