= Jo Ann Pottorff =

American politician (born 1936)

Member of the Kansas House of Representatives from the 83rd district
- In office January 14, 1985 – January 14, 2013
- Preceded by: Michael Meacham
- Succeeded by: Carolyn Bridges

Personal details
- Born: March 7, 1936 (age 90) Wichita, Kansas, U.S.
- Party: Republican
- Spouse: Gary Pottorff
- Children: 2
- Education: Kansas State University; St. Louis University

Jo Ann Pottorff (March 7, 1936) was a member of the Kansas House of Representatives, representing the 83rd district. She served from 1985 to 2013. Prior to her election she served as President of the Kansas Association of School Boards, as well as the Wichita School Board.

Pottorff was born in Wichita and has a BA in Elementary Education from Kansas State University and an MA in Urban Education from St. Louis University. She is a member of the Business Education Success Team, East Wichita Rotary, Forum for Executive Women, Wichita Chamber of Commerce, Junior League of Wichita, and National Assessment Governing Board.

Pottorff is a member of the Commerce and Labor, General Government Budget, Transportation and Public Safety Budget, and State Building Construction committees. One of the top donors to Pottorff's 2008 campaign was Kansans for Lifesaving Cures.

In May 2012, Pottorff announced that she would be retiring from politics and would not seek re-election.
