= Chuck Schmidt (politician) =

American politician

Member of the Kansas House of Representatives from the 88th district
- In office July 15, 2021 – January 2023
- Preceded by: Elizabeth Bishop
- Succeeded by: Sandy Pickert

Personal details
- Party: Democratic
- Spouse: Mary Schmidt

Chuck Schmidt is an American politician who served in the Kansas House of Representatives as a Democrat from the 88th district during 2021 and 2022.

In 2021, Elizabeth Bishop resigned her seat, and Schmidt was appointed to replace her. He ran in his own right in the 2022 election, facing no opposition in the primary election, but lost the general election by a 51% to 49% margin to Republican Sandy Pickert.
