= Dave Evans (reporter) =

American journalist

- Born: 1959 (age 66–67)
- Education: Missouri School of Journalism
- Occupation: Television journalist

Dave Evans (born 1959) is a retired American television journalist. From 1999 to 2022, he worked as a reporter for WABC-TV in New York City, New York.

== Early life and education ==
Evans earned a Bachelor of Arts degree in journalism from the Missouri School of Journalism at the University of Missouri in Columbia, Missouri.

== Career ==
He was a reporter for KAKE-TV in Wichita, Kansas, for a few years.

More recently, Evans was a reporter for WFAA-TV in Dallas, Texas, where he was a senior political reporter for a decade. Evans covered several high-profile political stories and elections. He reported on Ross Perot's 1992 United States presidential campaign and his subsequent 1996 campaign, as well as the 1995 Oklahoma City bombing.

Evans has covered international affairs. He has reported on the Civil War that happened in Central America. He led coverage for the American intervention in Haiti.

He traveled to Iowa to cover the 2008 U.S. presidential election.

After serving as a political reporter for nearly 22 years for WABC-TV, Evans officially retired from reporting on January 7, 2022.

=== Accolades ===
Evans received the award for American Press Best Reporter in Texas.

== See also ==
- List of American journalists
- List of people from Dallas
- List of people from New York City
- List of people from Wichita, Kansas
- List of television reporters
- List of University of Missouri alumni
