= Paul Feleciano =

American politician

Member of the Kansas Senate from the 28th district
- In office 1977 – December 8, 2003
- Preceded by: Robert Madden
- Succeeded by: Henry Helgerson

Member of the Kansas House of Representatives from the 97th district
- In office 1973–1976

Personal details
- Born: March 27, 1942 (age 84) New York City, New York, U.S.
- Party: Democratic
- Spouse: V. Arlene Williams

Paul Feleciano Jr. (born March 27, 1942) is an American former politician who spent three decades as a Democrat in the Kansas State Legislature, primarily serving in the Kansas State Senate.

Feleciano was born in what he describes as "the ghetto" in New York City. He joined the U.S. Air Force and his service there brought him to Wichita, Kansas, where he met and married Arlene Williams. In 1972, Feleciano was working as an insurance agent and moonlighting as a bartender when Robert Madden, a member of the Kansas House of Representatives, recruited him to run for the House of Representatives in a redrawn district; Madden himself would run for the 28th Senate district.

Feleciano successfully won election to the House, and was re-elected in 1974. In 1976, he succeeded Madden in the 28th Senate district, where he spent the next 26 years. In 2003, Feleciano resigned his seat, when he was appointed by Governor Kathleen Sebelius to the Kansas Parole Board.

Party political offices
Preceded by Daniel Landers	Democratic nominee for Kansas Insurance Commissioner; 1990	Succeeded by Kathleen Sebelius
