= Mark Kahrs =

American politician

Member of the Kansas House of Representatives from the 87th district
- In office 2013–2016
- Preceded by: Joseph Scapa
- Succeeded by: Roger Elliott

Personal details
- Born: May 19, 1962 (age 64) San Jose, California
- Party: Republican
- Spouse: Sherri Kahrs

Mark A. Kahrs (born May 19, 1962) is an American politician who served in the Kansas House of Representatives as a Republican from 2013 to 2016. Kahrs was initially elected in November 2012, taking 62% of the vote in an easy victory over Democrat Chris Florquist. He was re-elected in 2014, and declined to run for re-election in 2016.
