= Jim Ward (Kansas politician) =

American politician (born 1957)

Minority Leader of the Kansas House of Representatives
- In office January 9, 2017 – January 14, 2019
- Preceded by: Tom Burroughs
- Succeeded by: Tom Sawyer

Member of the Kansas House of Representatives
- In office January 13, 2003 – January 11, 2021
- Constituency: 86th District (2013-2021); 88th District (2003-2013)

Member of the Kansas Senate from the 29th district
- In office January 1991 – January 11, 1993
- Preceded by: Eugene Anderson
- Succeeded by: U. L. Gooch

Personal details
- Born: December 5, 1957 (age 68) Omaha, Nebraska, U.S.
- Party: Democratic
- Spouse: Karen
- Children: 2
- Education: Creighton University (BA); Washburn University (JD)

James Ward (born December 5, 1957) is a Democratic former member of the Kansas House of Representatives, who represented the 86th district from 2013 to 2021. He was first elected to seat 88 in 2003 and served as the House Minority Leader from 2017 to 2019, succeeded by Representative Tom Sawyer as of January 14, 2019. Ward ran for the 28th district of the Kansas Senate against incumbent Mike Petersen but was defeated.

Prior to his election to the House, Ward served in the Kansas Senate from 1991 to 1993 and on the Wichita City Council in 1991.

In 2017, Ward announced but later withdrew his candidacy for the 2018 gubernatorial election in Kansas.

== Early life, education, and career ==
James (Jim) Ward was born in Omaha, Nebraska, on December 5, 1957.

Ward received his bachelor's degree from Creighton University and his JD from Washburn University in Topeka, Kansas. He practices law in Wichita, Kansas. He is a member of the Wichita Bar Association, Project Freedom, and the Wichita Youth Court Project.

Before his election to the Kansas House of Representatives, Ward served on the Wichita City Council, then beginning in 1991, in the Kansas Senate through 1993, and later the Wichita School Board. He was elected to state House seat 88 in 2002, defeating Republican Hoyt Hillman and Libertarian David Moffett.

In 2018, Ward supported the Kansas Legislature's override of former Kansas Governor Sam Brownback's 2012 tax cuts.

In November 2017, Ward spoke in Washington D.C. to U.S. Senate Democrats at a hearing examining similarities between a national Republican tax plan and former Kansas Governor Brownback's 2012 tax plan which was overridden in 2017. Ward said "The great experiment was a complete and utter failure that nearly bankrupted our state...You put that on steroids and pass it around the country. Not only will it hurt the U.S. economy, it'll affect the world economy."

Ward was named a Public Official of the Year for Bipartisan leadership in 2017 by Governing.

== Political positions ==
Ward is a supporter of Medicaid expansion, and he has repeatedly introduced legislation to expand the program. Ward also opposes efforts to impose work requirements and lifetime caps on Medicaid recipients. In 2018, he said, “There is no independent data that shows work requirements do anything except reduce the number of people who get health care."

In 2015, Ward called for an audit of the Kansas Department for Children and Families after several children died in state custody. He spoke to the Kansas Legislative Post Audit Committee on July 29, 2015: “In the last couple of years, I’ve been getting more and more and more concerns presented to me about supervision not being done, placements being changed fairly radically quickly, and care plans not being followed through with."

Later in 2015, Ward requested another audit of DCF on the grounds that the agency was discriminating against same-sex couples who were trying to adopt children. An audit of DCF was conducted in 2017.

Ward is an advocate of greater K-12 education spending in Kansas. In 2018, he said, “We are not adequately funding schools, and the outcomes are proving that." When the Kansas House passed a $500 million school funding increase during the 2018 legislative session, Ward did not vote for it. He argued that a larger investment was required to make up for years of “chronic underfunding” and adhere to the Kansas Supreme Court’s ruling that education funding in the state is inadequate and inequitable: “It’s frustrating. I don’t think anyone on our side of the aisle thinks we’ve fixed the problem or ended the litigation."

During the 2018 gubernatorial campaign, Ward said he would reinstate an executive order that protects LGBT state workers from discrimination (which was originally signed by Gov. Kathleen Sebelius). He also said he would support an anti-discrimination law: “As governor, I would reinstate the executive order, in addition to encouraging the legislature to enact a law protecting every Kansan from discrimination."

Ward supports substantial changes to gun laws in Kansas. He has worked to repeal the Personal and Family Protection Act, which allows concealed firearms on the campuses of public universities in the state. He is opposed to arming K-12 teachers, while he supports raising the minimum age for semi-automatic firearm purchases to 21, implementing comprehensive background checks for all gun buyers, preventing people with domestic violence or other violent crime convictions from possessing or purchasing firearms, and banning bump stocks in Kansas.

== Assistant District Attorney ==
Ward served as Assistant District Attorney for the 18th Judicial District prior to opening his own practice in 1990. He worked on the first case in Kansas history to utilize DNA as evidence in a murder trial. (State v. Pioletti)

== 2018 gubernatorial candidacy ==
On August 19, 2017, Ward announced his candidacy for the 2018 Kansas gubernatorial race. He withdrew from the race in May 2018, instead announcing that he would seek re-election to the Kansas House of Representatives.

== Personal life ==
Ward has two adult children; Zack and Emily.

Kansas House of Representatives
Preceded by Tom Burroughs	Minority Leader of the Kansas House of Representatives; 2017–2019	Succeeded by Tom Sawyer
Preceded by Judith Loganbill	Member of the Kansas House of Representatives; From the 86th District; January 14, 2013 - January 11, 2021	Succeeded by Stephanie Byers
Preceded by Gwen Welshimer	Member of the Kansas House of Representatives; From the 88th District; January 13, 2003 - January 14, 2013	Succeeded by Patricia Sloop
