= Roger Elliot =

Roger Elliot may refer to:

- Roger Elliot, character in Batman: Streets of Gotham
- Roger Elliot, character in Winner Take All (1932 film)

== See also ==
- Roger Elliott (disambiguation)
- Elliot Rodger (1991–2014), perpetrator of the 2014 Isla Vista killings
