= Judith Loganbill =

American politician (1953–2020)

Member of the Kansas House of Representatives from the 86th district
- In office January 8, 2001 – January 14, 2013
- Preceded by: Henry Helgerson
- Succeeded by: Jim Ward

Personal details
- Born: May 5, 1953 Newton, Kansas, U.S.
- Died: December 19, 2020 (aged 67) Wichita, Kansas, U.S.
- Party: Democratic
- Education: Bethel College; Northern Arizona University

Judith Elaine Loganbill (May 5, 1953 – December 19, 2020) was an American politician who served as a Democratic member of the Kansas House of Representatives, representing the 86th district from 2001 to 2013.

She died on December 19, 2020, in Wichita, Kansas, at age 67.

== Committee membership ==
- Education
- Federal and State Affairs (Ranking Member)
- Government Efficiency and Fiscal Oversight
- Joint Committee on Kansas Security

== Major donors ==
The top 5 donors to Loganbill's 2008 campaign:

- 1. Kansas Contractors Assoc $1,000
- 2. Kansans for Lifesaving Cures $1,000
- 3. Kansas Trial Lawyers Assoc $1,000
- 4. Kansas National Education Assoc $750
- 5. Kansas Optometric Assoc $750
