= Sam Brownback =

American politician and diplomat (born 1956)

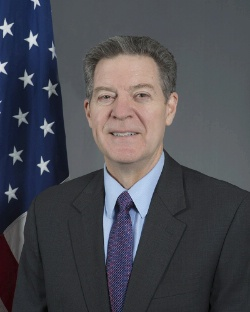
- Official portrait, 2018

5th United States Ambassador-at-Large for International Religious Freedom
- In office February 1, 2018 – January 20, 2021
- President: Donald Trump
- Preceded by: David Saperstein
- Succeeded by: Rashad Hussain

46th Governor of Kansas
- In office January 10, 2011 – January 31, 2018
- Lieutenant: Jeff Colyer
- Preceded by: Mark Parkinson
- Succeeded by: Jeff Colyer

United States Senator from Kansas
- In office November 7, 1996 – January 3, 2011
- Preceded by: Sheila Frahm
- Succeeded by: Jerry Moran

Member of the U.S. House of Representatives from Kansas's 2nd district
- In office January 3, 1995 – November 7, 1996
- Preceded by: Jim Slattery
- Succeeded by: Jim Ryun

Secretary of Agriculture of Kansas
- In office September 18, 1986 – July 30, 1993
- Governor: John W. Carlin; Mike Hayden; Joan Finney
- Preceded by: Harland Priddle
- Succeeded by: Philip Fishburn

Personal details
- Born: Samuel Dale Brownback; September 12, 1956 (age 70) Garnett, Kansas, U.S.
- Party: Republican
- Spouse: Mary Stauffer (m. 1982)
- Children: 5
- Education: Kansas State University (BA); University of Kansas (JD)
- Brownback's voice Brownback on the death Sen. Robert Byrd. Recorded June 30, 2010

Samuel Dale Brownback (born September 12, 1956) is an American attorney, politician, and diplomat who served as a United States senator from Kansas from 1996 to 2011 and as the 46th governor of Kansas from 2011 to 2018. A member of the Republican Party, Brownback also served as the United States Ambassador-at-Large for International Religious Freedom during the first administration of President Donald Trump. Since March 2026, he has served as a Senior Fellow to Advance International Religious Freedom at Pepperdine University.

Born in Garnett, Kansas, Brownback grew up on a family farm in Parker, Kansas. He graduated from Kansas State University with a degree in agricultural economics in 1978 and received a J.D. from the University of Kansas in 1982. He worked as an attorney in Manhattan, Kansas, before being appointed Secretary of Agriculture of Kansas in 1986 by Democratic governor John W. Carlin. Brownback ran for Congress in 1994 and defeated Carlin in the general election in a landslide. He represented Kansas's 2nd congressional district for a single term before running in a 1996 special election for the U.S. Senate seat previously held by Bob Dole. He won the election and was reelected by large margins in 1998 and 2004. Brownback ran for president in 2008, but withdrew before the primaries began and endorsed eventual Republican nominee John McCain.

Brownback declined to run for reelection in 2010, instead running for governor. He was elected governor of Kansas in 2010 and took office in January 2011. As governor, Brownback signed into law one of the largest income tax cuts in Kansas history, known as the Kansas experiment. The tax cuts caused state revenues to fall by hundreds of millions of dollars and created large budget shortfalls. A major budget deficit led to cuts in areas including education and transportation. In a repudiation of the Patient Protection and Affordable Care Act, in 2013 Brownback turned down a $31.5 million grant from the U.S. Department of Health and Human Services to set up a public health insurance exchange for Kansas. Also in 2013, he signed a bill that blocked tax breaks for abortion providers, banned sex-selection abortions, and declared that life begins at fertilization. In the run-up to the 2014 gubernatorial election, over 100 former and current Kansas Republican officials criticized Brownback's leadership and endorsed his Democratic opponent, Paul Davis. Despite this, Brownback was narrowly reelected. In June 2017, the Kansas Legislature repealed Brownback's tax cuts, overrode Brownback's veto of the repeal, and enacted tax increases. Brownback left office as one of the least popular governors in the country.

On July 26, 2017, the Trump administration announced that Brownback would be nominated as the new U.S. Ambassador-at-Large for International Religious Freedom. Brownback was confirmed in January 2018 in a party-line vote; Vice President Mike Pence cast the necessary tie-breaking votes to end a filibuster and to confirm his nomination. Brownback resigned as governor of Kansas effective January 31, 2018, and was sworn in as U.S. Ambassador at Large for International Religious Freedom on February 1, 2018. His ambassadorial tenure ended in January 2021.

== Early life and education ==
Sam Brownback was born on September 12, 1956, in Garnett, Kansas, to Nancy (née Cowden) and Glen Robert Brownback. He was raised in a farming family in Parker, Kansas. Some of Brownback's German-American ancestors settled in Kansas after leaving Pennsylvania following the Civil War. Throughout his youth, Brownback was involved with the FFA (formerly the Future Farmers of America), serving as president of his local and state FFA chapters, and as national FFA vice president from 1976 to 1977.

After graduating from Prairie View High School, Brownback attended Kansas State University, where was elected student body president and became a member of the Alpha Gamma Rho agricultural fraternity. After graduating from college in 1978 with a degree in Agricultural Economics in 1978, he spent about a year working as a radio broadcaster for the now-defunct KSAC farm department, hosting a weekly half-hour show. Brownback received his J.D. from the University of Kansas in 1982.

== Early career ==
Brownback was an attorney in Manhattan, Kansas, before being appointed as Kansas Secretary of Agriculture by Governor John W. Carlin on September 18, 1986. In 1990, he was accepted into the White House Fellow program and detailed to the Office of the U.S. Trade Representative from 1990 to 1991. Brownback returned to Kansas to resume his position as Secretary of Agriculture. He left his post on July 30, 1993. He was elected to the U.S. House of Representatives in 1994 and ran in the 1996 special election for the U.S. Senate seat recently vacated by Bob Dole.

== U.S. Senator (1996–2011) ==
=== Elections ===
Sheila Frahm was appointed to fill the seat of U.S. senator Bob Dole when Dole resigned in 1996 to campaign for president. Brownback defeated Frahm in the 1996 Republican primary and went on to win the general election against Democrat Jill Docking by 112,677 votes. In 2001, the Federal Election Commission assessed fines and penalties against Brownback's campaign committee and against his in-laws for improper 1996 campaign contributions. As a result of these improper contributions, the campaign was ordered to pay the government $19,000 and Brownback's in-laws, John and Ruth Stauffer, were ordered to pay a $9,000 civil penalty for improperly funneling contributions through Triad Management Services.

In 1998, Brownback was elected to a full six-year term, defeating Democrat Paul Feleciano by 244,921 votes. He won reelection in the 2004 Senate election defeating Democratic former lobbyist Lee Jones by 470,526 votes.

Throughout his U.S. Senate career, his principal campaign donors were the Koch brothers of Wichita-based Koch Industries, who donated more to Brownback than to any other political candidate during this period.

=== Tenure ===
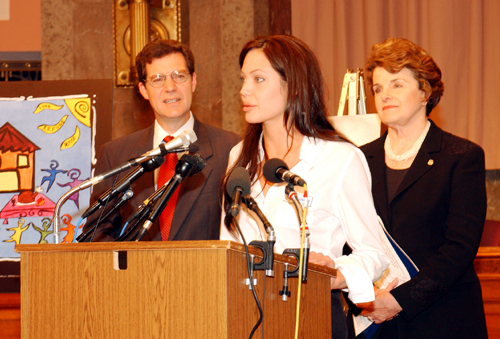
Senators Brownback and Feinstein in 2003, shown with Angelina Jolie, the Goodwill Ambassador for United Nations High Commissioner for Refugees, call for bipartisan legislation to reform the treatment of unaccompanied alien minors.

Brownback was a member of the Judiciary Committee, the Appropriations Committee (where he chaired the Subcommittee on District of Columbia when the Republicans were in the majority), the Joint Economic Committee, and the Commission on Security and Cooperation in Europe, also known as the Helsinki Commission, which he at one time chaired. The Helsinki Commission monitors compliance with international agreements reached in cooperation with Organization for Security and Co-operation in Europe.

In 2000, Brownback and Congressman Chris Smith led the effort to enact the Trafficking Victims Protection Act. President Clinton signed the legislation in October 2000. According to Christianity Today, the stronger enforcement increased the number of U.S. federal trafficking cases eightfold in the five years after enactment.

By August 12, 2007, in the 110th Session of Congress, Brownback had missed 123 votes due to campaigning (39.7 percent)–surpassed only by Tim Johnson (D) of South Dakota who due to a critical illness had missed 100% of the votes of the 110th Session, and John McCain (R) of Arizona with 149 votes missed due to campaigning (48.1 percent).

In 2006, Brownback blocked a confirmation vote on a George W. Bush federal appeals court nominee from Michigan, judge Janet T. Neff. He objected to her joining the bench solely because she attended a same-sex commitment ceremony in Massachusetts in 2002 that involved a next-door neighbor who was a close childhood friend of Neff's daughters. Brownback's action blocked confirmation votes on an entire slate of appointments that had been approved by a bipartisan group of senators. In July 2007, Brownback lifted the block that had prevented the vote, and the Senate confirmed Neff by an 83–4 vote. Brownback was joined in opposition by just three other conservatives, then-Senators Jim Bunning, Jon Kyl, and Mel Martinez.

In the mid-1990s, Brownback hired Paul Ryan as his chief legislative director. Ryan later became a member of Congress, vice-presidential candidate, and Speaker of the U.S. House of Representatives.

=== CREW complaints ===
In 2009, Citizens for Responsibility and Ethics in Washington (CREW) filed an ethics complaint over a fundraising letter signed by Brownback for a conservative Catholic group which they alleged violated Senate rules by mimicking official Senate letterhead. The letter had targeted five senators for being both Catholic and pro-choice: Maria Cantwell, John Kerry, Robert Menendez, Barbara Mikulski, and Patty Murray. A spokesman said Brownback had asked the group to stop sending the letter even before the complaint was filed.

In 2010, CREW lodged an ethics complaint claiming a possible violation of the Senate's gifts rule by four senators and four congressmembers. The congressmembers lived in a $1.8 million Washington, D.C. townhouse owned by C Street Center, Inc., which was in turn owned by Christian-advocacy group The Fellowship. CREW alleged that the property was being leased exclusively to congressional members, including Brownback, and that the tenants were paying rent that was below market value. Senator Tom Coburn's spokesman asserted that the rents charged were fair.

=== Committees ===
- Committee on Appropriations
  - Subcommittee on Agriculture, Rural Development, Food and Drug Administration, and Related Agencies (Ranking Member)
  - Subcommittee on Defense
  - Subcommittee on Homeland Security
  - Subcommittee on Military Construction, Veterans Affairs, and Related Agencies
  - Subcommittee on the Department of State, Foreign Operations, and Related Programs
  - Subcommittee on Transportation, Housing and Urban Development, and Related Agencies
- Committee on Commerce, Science, and Transportation
  - Subcommittee on Aviation Operations, Safety, and Security
  - Subcommittee on Communications, Technology, and the Internet
  - Subcommittee on Competitiveness, Innovation, and Export Promotion
  - Subcommittee on Surface Transportation and Merchant Marine Infrastructure, Safety, and Security
- Committee on Energy and Natural Resources
  - Subcommittee on Energy
  - Subcommittee on National Parks
  - Subcommittee on Water and Power (Ranking Member)
- Committee on Foreign Relations
- Special Committee on Aging
- Joint Economic Committee
- Commission on Security and Cooperation in Europe

== 2008 presidential campaign ==
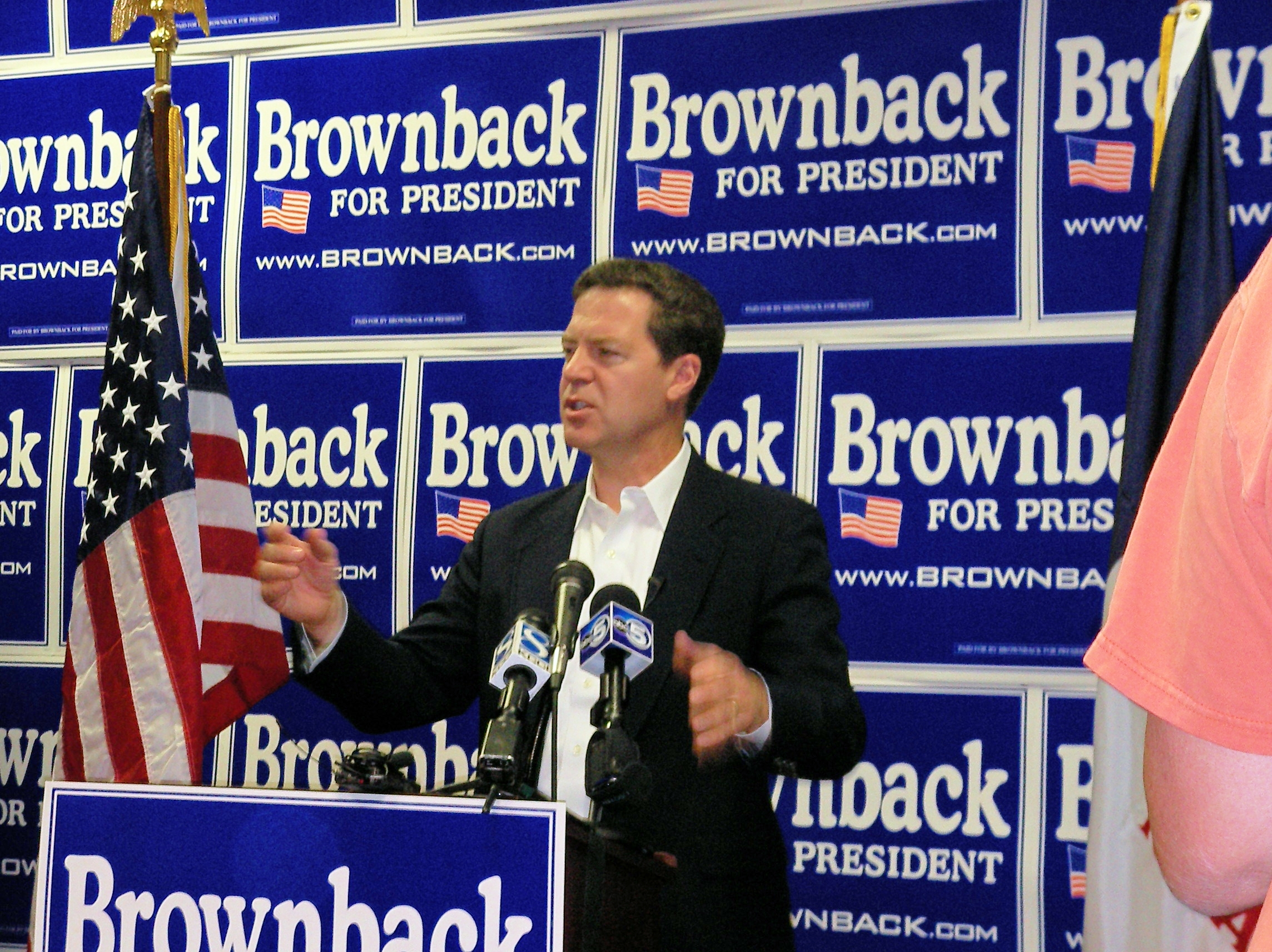
Senator Brownback officially opening his Iowa campaign headquarters in West Des Moines, IA

On December 4, 2006, Brownback formed an exploratory committee, the first step toward a presidential candidacy. In reporting on his potential candidacy, CNN and The Washington Post called Brownback a "favorite" of the religious right; Rolling Stone called him "God's senator" in 2006. His views placed him in the socially conservative wing of the Republican Party, and he stressed his fiscal conservatism as well. "I am an economic, a fiscal, a social and a compassionate conservative", he said in December 2006.

On January 20, 2007, in Topeka, Brownback announced that he was running for president in 2008. On February 22, 2007, a poll conducted by Rasmussen Reports held that three percent of likely primary voters would support Brownback.

Brownback discusses science and religion in American politics in October 2007, during his presidential run.

On August 11, 2007, Brownback finished third in the Ames Straw Poll with 15.3% of all votes cast. Fundraising and visits to his website declined dramatically after this event, as many supporters had predicted Brownback would do much better, and speculation began that the candidate was considering withdrawing from the campaign. This sentiment increased after his lackluster performance in the GOP presidential debate of September 5, broadcast from New Hampshire by Fox News Channel. He dropped out of the race on October 18, 2007, citing a lack of funds. Brownback formally announced his decision on October 19. He later endorsed John McCain for president.

== Governor of Kansas (2011–2018) ==
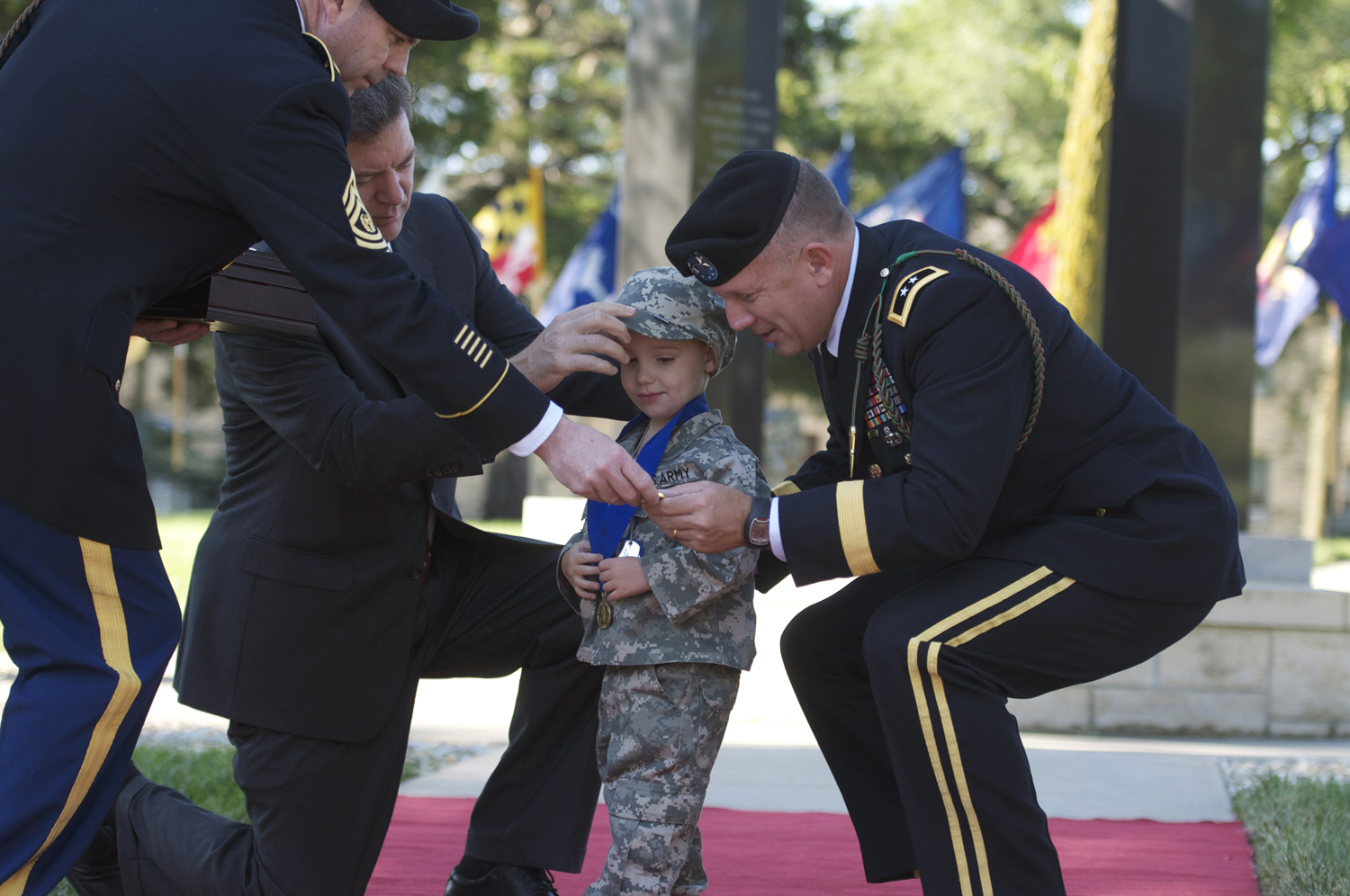
Brownback and 1st Infantry Division Commanding General present a medallion to a child whose father died serving in Iraq.

=== Elections ===
==== 2010 gubernatorial election ====
In 2008, Brownback acknowledged he was considering running for governor in 2010. In January 2009, Brownback officially filed the paperwork to run for governor.

His principal Senate-career campaign donors, the Koch brothers (and their Koch Industries), again backed Brownback's campaign.

Polling agency Rasmussen Reports found that Brownback led his then-likely Democratic opponent, Tom Holland, by 31 points in May 2010.

On June 1, 2010, Brownback named Kansas state senator Jeff Colyer as his running mate.

On November 2, 2010, Brownback defeated Holland, by 260,594 votes. He succeeded Governor Mark Parkinson, who was sworn in after former governor Kathleen Sebelius resigned from her position and became U.S. Secretary of Health and Human Services in 2009.

==== 2014 gubernatorial election ====
In October 2013, Kansas state representative Paul Davis, the Democratic minority leader of the Kansas House of Representatives, announced he would challenge Brownback in the 2014 Kansas gubernatorial election.

In July 2014, more than 100 current and former Kansas Republican officials (including former state party chairmen, Kansas Senate presidents, Kansas House speakers, and majority leaders) endorsed Democrat Davis over Republican Brownback, citing concern over Brownback's deep cuts in education and other government services, as well as the tax cuts that had left the state with a major deficit.

Tim Keck, chief of staff of Brownback's running mate, Lt. Governor Jeff Colyer, unearthed and publicized a 1998 police report showing that Davis, 26 and unmarried at the time, had been briefly detained during the raid of a strip club. Davis was found to have no involvement in the cause for the raid, and was quickly allowed to leave. Responding to criticism of Keck's involvement in the campaign, Brownback spokesman John Milburn commented that it was legal to use taxpayer-paid staff to campaign. Media law experts expressed amazement when they learned that the Montgomery County's sheriff released non-public investigative files in response to a mere request, noting that in Kansas, if members of the public want incident reports and investigative files, they typically must file a lawsuit in order to get them. Brownback's campaign capitalized on the 16-year-old incident.

Brownback was reelected with a plurality, defeating Davis by 32,096 votes, or 3.69%.

=== Tenure ===
Brownback took office in January 2011, in the early years of national recovery from the Great Recession. Also in 2011, Republicans resumed control of the Kansas House of Representatives with their largest majority in half a century. Most Republicans in the Kansas Legislature were members of the Tea Party movement who shared Brownback's conservative views.

Two of Brownback's major stated goals were to reduce taxes and to increase spending on education.

By April 2012, Brownback had an approval rating of 34 percent according to a Survey USA Poll. A Republican polling company found his approval rating to be 51 percent in May 2012. In November 2015, Brownback had an approval rating of 26 percent according to a Morning Consult poll, the lowest among all governors in the United States. Three separate polls between November 2015 and September 2016 ranked Brownback as the nation's least-popular governor—a September 2016 poll showing an approval rating of 23%. In the state elections of 2016—seen largely as a referendum on Brownback's policies and administration—Brownback's supporters in the legislature suffered major defeats. In 2017 after a protracted battle, the new Kansas Legislature overrode Brownback's vetoes, voting to repeal his tax cuts and enact tax increases.

Brownback, who had a 66% disapproval rating after the repeal of his signature law, left office in 2018 as one of the least popular governors in the country.

The Kansas City Star was named a finalist in the Public Service category for a 2018 Pulitzer Prize due to its series entitled "Why so secret, Kansas?" The Star reported that Kansas's already-secretive state government had only grown worse under Brownback.

==== Legislative agenda ====
Brownback proposed fundamental tax reform to encourage investment and generate wealth while creating new jobs. Consistent with those objectives, he also proposed structural reforms to the state's largest budget items, school finance, Medicaid, and Kansas Public Employees Retirement System (KPERS), which have unfunded liabilities of $8.3 billion. Brownback sought to follow a "red state model", passing conservative social and economic policies.

==== Taxes ====
As governor, Brownback initiated what he called a "red-state experiment"—dramatic cuts in income tax rates intended to bring economic growth. In May 2012, Brownback signed into law one of the largest income tax cuts in Kansas' history—the nation's largest state income tax cut (in percentage) since the 1990s. Brownback described the tax cuts as a live experiment:

[On] taxes, you need to get your overall rates down, and you need to get your social manipulation out of it, in my estimation, to create growth. We'll see how it works. We'll have a real live experiment.

The legislation was crafted with help from his Budget Director (former Koch brothers political consultant Steven Anderson); the Koch-sponsored American Legislative Exchange Council (ALEC); and Arthur Laffer, a popular supply-side economist and former economic adviser for President Ronald Reagan.

The law eliminated non-wage income taxes for the owners of 191,000 businesses, and cut individuals' income tax rates. The first phase of his cuts reduced the top Kansas income-tax rate from 6.45 percent down to 4.9 percent, and immediately eliminated income tax on business profits from partnerships and limited liability corporations passed through to individuals. The income tax cuts would provide US$231 million in tax reductions in its first year, growing to US$934 million after six years. A forecast from the Legislature's research staff indicated that a budget shortfall will emerge by 2014 and will grow to nearly US$2.5 billion by July 2018. The cuts were based on model legislation published by the American Legislative Exchange Council (ALEC).

In a May 2014 Wall Street Journal op-ed entitled "A Midwest Renaissance Rooted in the Reagan Formula", Brownback compared his tax policies with those of Ronald Reagan. Brownback anticipated a "prosperous future" for Kansas, Oklahoma and Missouri because they had enacted policies based on economic principles that Reagan laid out in 1964.

The act was criticized by University of Kansas law professor Martin B. Dickinson for shifting the tax burden from wealthy Kansans to low- and moderate-income workers, with the top income tax rate dropping by 25%. Under Brownback, Kansas also lowered the sales tax and eliminated a tax on small businesses. The tax cuts helped contribute to Moody's downgrading of the state's bond rating in 2014. They also contributed to the S&P Ratings' credit downgrade from AA+ to AA in August 2014 due to a budget that analysts described as structurally unbalanced. As of June 2014, the state had fallen far short of projected tax collections, receiving $369 million instead of the planned-for $651 million.

The tax cuts and their effect on the economy of Kansas received considerable criticism in the media. Critics of the tax cuts included Michael Hiltzik of the Los Angeles Times, the editorial board of The Washington Post, The New Republic, and Bloomberg Businessweek. The New York Times described Brownback's policies as "too far to the right". Grover Norquist of Americans for Tax Reform defended the tax cuts as a model for the nation.

In February 2017, a bi-partisan coalition presented a bill that would repeal most of Brownback's tax overhaul to make up for the budget shortfall. The Senate passed SB 30 (38–0, with 2 not voting) on February 2, 2017. The House passed SB 30 as amended (123–2) on February 22, 2017. The Conference Committee Report was adopted by both the House (69–52) and Senate (26–14) on June 5, 2017. On June 6, 2017, the bill was sent to Brownback for signature, but he vetoed the bill. Later in the day both the House and Senate voted to override the veto. Senate Bill 30 repealed most of the tax cuts which had taken effect in January 2013.

Brownback's tax overhaul was described in a June 2017 article in The Atlantic as the United States' "most aggressive experiment in conservative economic policy". The drastic tax cuts had "threatened the viability of schools and infrastructure" in Kansas.

The Brownback experiment didn't work. We saw that loud and clear.
—Heidi Holliday, executive director of the Kansas Center for Economic Growth 2017

==== Education ====
In April 2014, Brownback signed a controversial school finance bill that eliminated mandatory due process hearings, which were previously required to fire experienced teachers. According to the Kansas City Star:

The bill also allows school districts to hire unlicensed teachers for science and math classes. And it creates a tax break for corporations that donate to private school scholarship funds.

The resulting cuts in funding caused districts to shut down the school year early.

==== Economy ====
According to the Bureau of Economic Analysis, during the period from 2008 to 2018 (Brownback was governor from 2011 to 2018), Kansas averaged an annual GDP growth rate of 0.9% -- exactly half the national average. During that same period — when national employment increased and wages rose — job growth in Wichita (Kansas' largest city, and hometown of Brownback's principal funders, the Koch family) dropped 3.2%, and the city's average annual wages stagnated.

In 2015, the job growth rate in Kansas was 0.8 percent, among the lowest rate in America with only "10,900 total nonfarm jobs" added that year. Kansas had a $350 million budget shortfall in February 2017. In February 2017, S&P downgraded Kansas' credit rating to AA−.

Despite Kansas' major role in the aerospace, telecommunications and GPS technology industries, a 2019 report from the KC Tech Council reported that Kansas growth in tech jobs ranked next-to-last in the nation — losing 220 tech jobs between 2017 and 2018 (Brownback's final year as governor), according to the Computing Technology Industry Association — while over 40 other states grew tech employment. Despite slowing the rates of decline following the Great Recession, 59% of telecommunications jobs in the Kansas City telecommunications industry — and 600 jobs in Wichita's (aerospace-dominated) manufacturing industry — were lost during the Brownback administration.

By the last year of the Brownback administration, 2018, Kansas had the second-highest farm-bankruptcy rate increase in the nation (after New York) — a decade-high rate for the state.

==== Health care ====
In August 2011, over the objections of Republican Kansas Insurance Commissioner Sandy Praeger, Brownback announced he was declining a $31.5 million grant from the U.S. Department of Health and Human Services to set up an insurance exchange as part of the federal health care reform law. In May 2011, Brownback had directed the state's insurance commissioner to slow the implementation timeline for the exchange development. Upon announcing the refusal of the budgeted grant money for the state, his office stated:

There is much uncertainty surrounding the ability of the federal government to meet its already budgeted future spending obligations. Every state should be preparing for fewer federal resources, not more. To deal with that reality Kansas needs to maintain maximum flexibility. That requires freeing Kansas from the strings attached to the Early Innovator Grant.

The move was unanimously supported by the delegates of the state party central committee at its August 2011 meeting, but a New York Times editorial criticized Brownback for turning down the grant which could have helped ease the state's own budget:

Instead of letting Kansas design its own model program for an online computer exchange to help people choose among health insurance providers, Mr. Brownback's rebuff increases the likelihood that the state must design one at its own expense or see federal officials create an exchange, as required under the new law.

Brownback also signed into law the Health Care Freedom Act, based on model legislation published by the American Legislative Exchange Council (ALEC).

==== Abortion ====
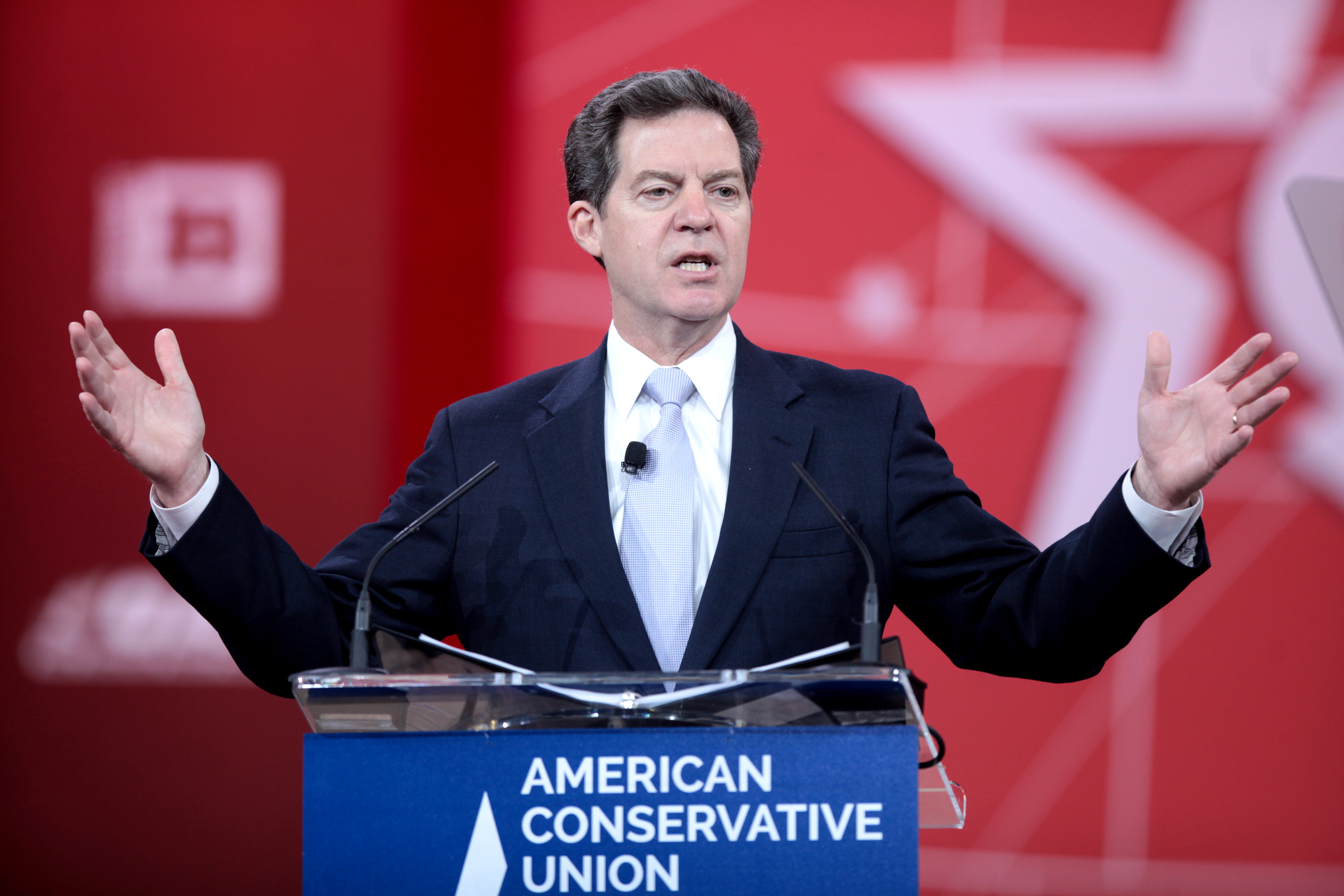
Sam Brownback speaking at the 2015 Conservative Political Action Conference (CPAC) in National Harbor, Maryland on February 27, 2015

Brownback signed three anti-abortion bills in 2011. In April 2011, he signed a bill banning abortion after 21 weeks, and a bill requiring that a doctor get a parent's notarized signature before providing an abortion to a minor. In May 2011, Brownback approved a bill prohibiting insurance companies from offering abortion coverage as part of general health plans unless the procedure is necessary to save a woman's life. The law also prohibits any health-insurance exchange in Kansas established under the federal Affordable Care Act from offering coverage for abortions other than to save a woman's life.

A Kansas budget passed with Brownback's approval in 2011 blocked Planned Parenthood of Kansas and Mid-Missouri from receiving family planning funds from the state. The funding amounted to about $330,000 a year. A judge has blocked the budget provision, ordered Kansas to begin funding the organization again, and agreed with Planned Parenthood that it was being unfairly targeted. In response, the state filed an appeal seeking to overturn the judge's decision. Brownback has defended anti-abortion laws in Kansas, including the Planned Parenthood defunding. "You can't know for sure what all comes out of that afterwards, but it was the will of the Legislature and the people of the state of Kansas", Brownback said.

In May 2012, Brownback signed the Health Care Rights of Conscience Act, which "will allow pharmacists to refuse to provide drugs they believe might cause an abortion".

In April 2013, Brownback signed a bill that blocked tax breaks for abortion providers, banned sex-selection abortions and declared that life begins at fertilization. The law notes that any rights conferred by it are subject to limits set forth in applicable U.S. Supreme Court decisions.

On April 7, 2015, Brownback signed The Unborn Child Protection From Dismemberment Abortion Act, which bans the most common technique used for second-trimester abortions. Kansas became the first state to ban the procedure.

==== Prayer rally ====
Brownback attended Texas governor Rick Perry's prayer event in August 2011. Aside from Gov. Perry himself, Brownback was the only U.S. governor who attended. About 22,000 people attended the rally, and Brownback and Perry were the only elected officials to speak. Brownback's participation in the rally resulted in some controversy, and editorials published in The Winfield Daily Courier and The Kansas City Star expressed disappointment.

== U.S. Ambassador-at-Large for International Religious Freedom ==
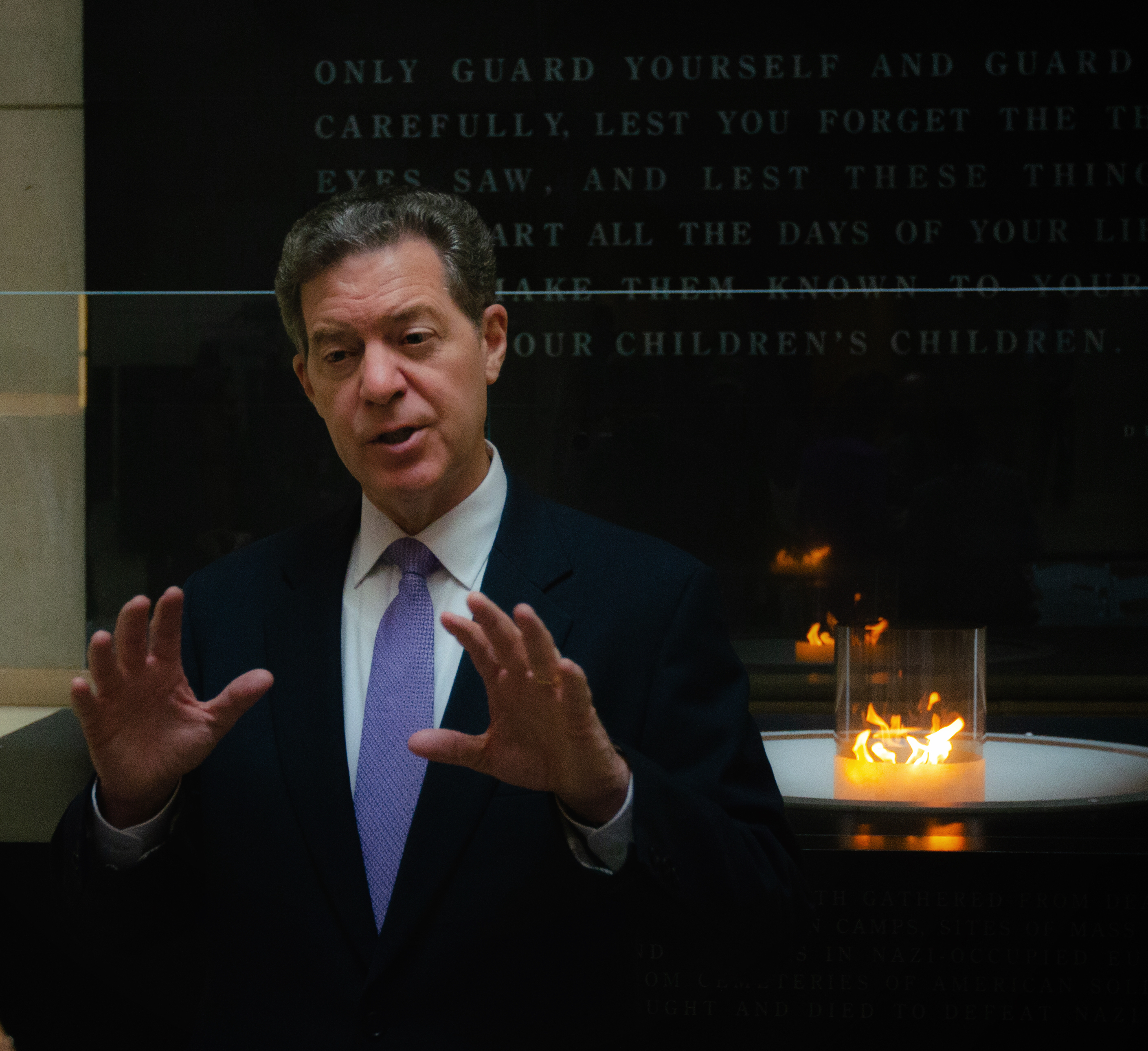
Brownback speaks at the Holocaust Museum in 2018

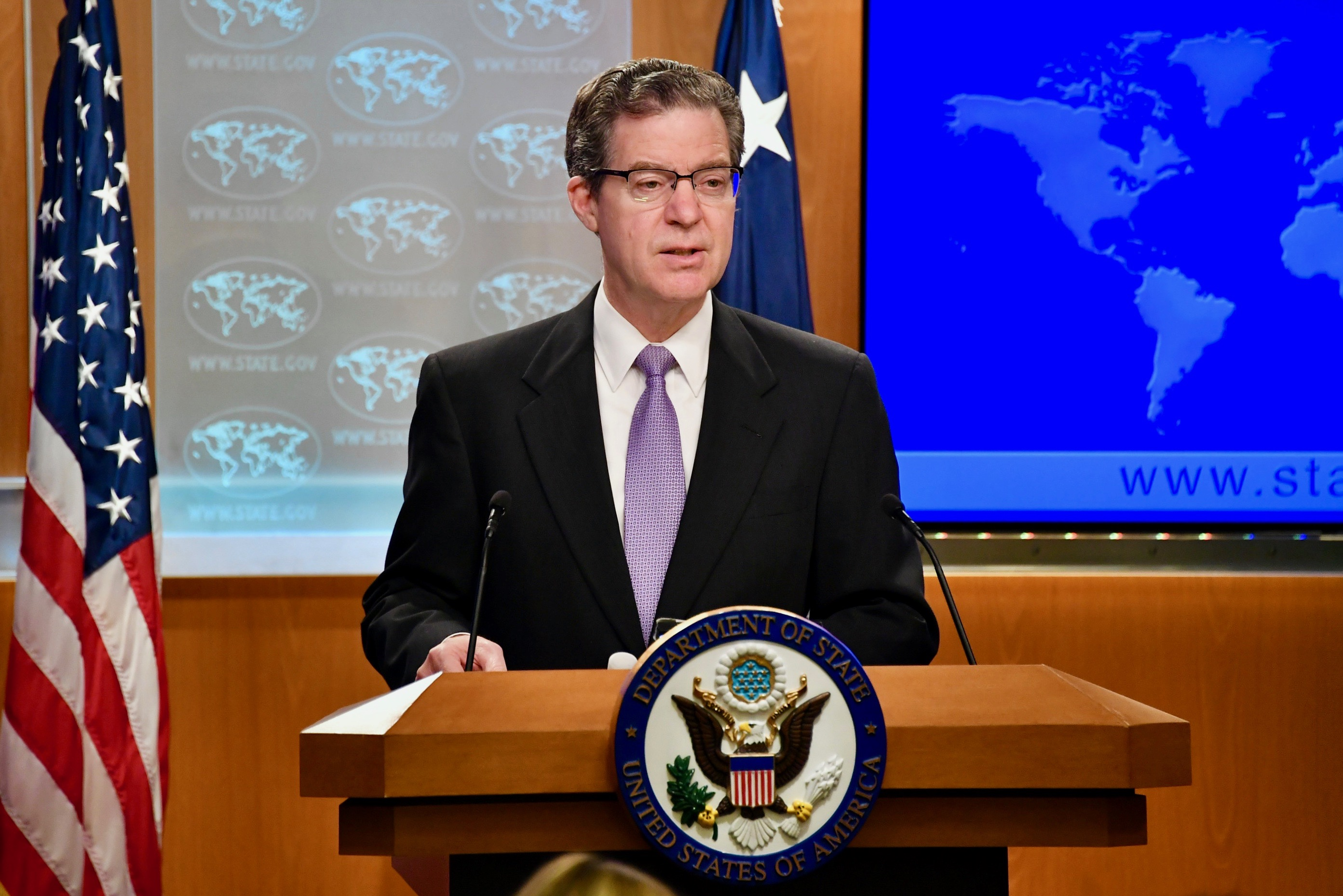
Brownback speaks at the State Department in 2019

=== Nomination and confirmation ===
In March 2017, it was reported that Brownback was being considered by President Donald Trump to be appointed either as his U.S. Ambassador to the U.N. for Food and Agriculture in Rome, or as the U.S. Ambassador-at-Large for International Religious Freedom in Washington, DC. On July 26, 2017, the White House issued a statement that Brownback would be nominated as the new U.S. Ambassador-at-Large for International Religious Freedom. As a senator in 1998, Brownback sponsored the legislation that first created the United States Commission on International Religious Freedom (USCIRF).

Due to his positions and actions on Islam and LGBT issues, Brownback's nomination was criticized by figures such as Rabbi Moti Rieber, the executive director of Kansas Interfaith Action, Robert McCaw, director of government affairs for the Council on American-Islamic Relations (CAIR), as well as the American Civil Liberties Union.

As of the end of the 2017 session, Brownback's Ambassadorial nomination had not come up for a confirmation vote. As it failed to receive unanimous support for it to carry over to 2018 for approval, it required renomination to come to a vote. He was renominated on January 8, 2018.

On January 24, 2018, the Senate voted along party lines, 49–49, with two Republicans absent, to advance his nomination to the floor, with Vice President Mike Pence casting the tie-breaking vote to end the Democrats' filibuster. With the Senate again locked at 49–49 later that day, Pence again cast the tie-breaking vote, confirming the nomination. On January 25, Brownback submitted his resignation as governor. Brownback's resignation was effective January 31, 2018, on which date Lieutenant Governor Jeff Colyer was sworn in as governor.

=== Tenure ===
Brownback was sworn in on February 1, 2018. He became the first Catholic to serve in the role.

Ambassador Brownback with President Donald Trump and several 'survivors of religious persecution' including Nadia Murad on July 17, 2019

In July 2018, Brownback reportedly lobbied the UK government over the treatment of far-right British activist Tommy Robinson. Arizona Republican representative Paul Gosar and five other congressmen invited Robinson to speak to United States Congress on November 14, 2018, on a trip sponsored by the U.S.-based, Middle East Forum. He was expected to get visa approval by the State Department despite his criminal convictions and use of fraudulent passports to enter and depart the U.S.

Brownback's tenure as ambassador ended on January 20, 2021.

=== Issues ===
Brownback promoted religious freedom as a means of promoting individual and economic flourishing and reducing terrorism and other types of religion-related violence.

Brownback repeatedly condemned China's record on religious freedom, saying, "China is at war with faith. It is a war they will not win". He highlighted China's persecution of Uyghurs, Tibetan Buddhists, Falun Gong practitioners, and Chinese Christians. In remarks made at the United Nations, Brownback strongly condemned the Xinjiang re-education camps where more than one million Uyghurs are reported to have been detained. On July 13, 2020, Brownback, along with three other U.S. politicians, was sanctioned by the Chinese government for "interfering in China’s internal affairs" through their condemnation of human rights abuses in Xinjiang.

In his first trip as Ambassador, Brownback traveled to Bangladesh to meet with Rohingya refugees from Myanmar at the Kutupalong refugee camp near Cox's Bazar, Bangladesh. Brownback stated that the accounts of violence he heard were as bad as anything he had ever seen, including in his visits to Darfur, Sudan in 2004. Following the trip, the State Department highlighted Myanmar's intensification of violence against its ethnic minorities. In the 2017 International Religious Freedom Report, the State Department described the violence against the Rohingya that forced an estimated 688,000 people to flee Myanmar as "ethnic cleansing."

At the 2020 Ministerial to Advance Freedom of Religion or Belief in Poland, Brownback spoke about COVID-19's effect on freedom of religion.

== Positions ==
=== Abortion ===
Brownback opposes abortion. He was personally anti-abortion though politically pro-choice during his early career. In 2007, Brownback said that he saw abortion "as the lead moral issue of our day, just like slavery was the lead moral issue 150 years ago." On May 3, 2007, when asked his opinion of repealing Roe v. Wade, Brownback said, "It would be a glorious day of human liberty and freedom."

In 2007, Brownback said he "could support a pro-choice nominee" to the presidency because "this is a big coalition party."

=== Arts ===
In May 2011, Brownback eliminated by executive order and then vetoed government funding for the Kansas Arts Commission in response to state defiance of his executive order, making Kansas the first state to de-fund its arts commission. The National Endowment for the Arts informed Kansas that without a viable state arts agency, it would not receive a planned $700,000 federal grant. Brownback has said he believes private donations should fund arts and culture in the state. He created the Kansas Arts Foundation, an organization dedicated to private fundraising to make up the gap created by state budget cuts.

=== Capital punishment ===
Brownback said in an interview: "I am not a supporter of a death penalty, other than in cases where we cannot protect the society and have other lives at stake." In a speech on the Senate Judiciary Committee, he questioned the current use of the death penalty as potentially incongruent with the notion of a "culture of life", and suggested it be employed in a more limited fashion.

=== Darfur ===
Brownback visited refugee camps in Sudan in 2004 and returned to write a resolution labeling the Darfur conflict as genocide, and has been active on attempting to increase U.S. efforts to resolve the situation short of military intervention. He is an endorser of the Genocide Intervention Network, which called him a "champion of Darfur" in its Darfur scorecard, primarily for his early advocacy of the Darfur Peace and Accountability Act.

=== Economic issues ===
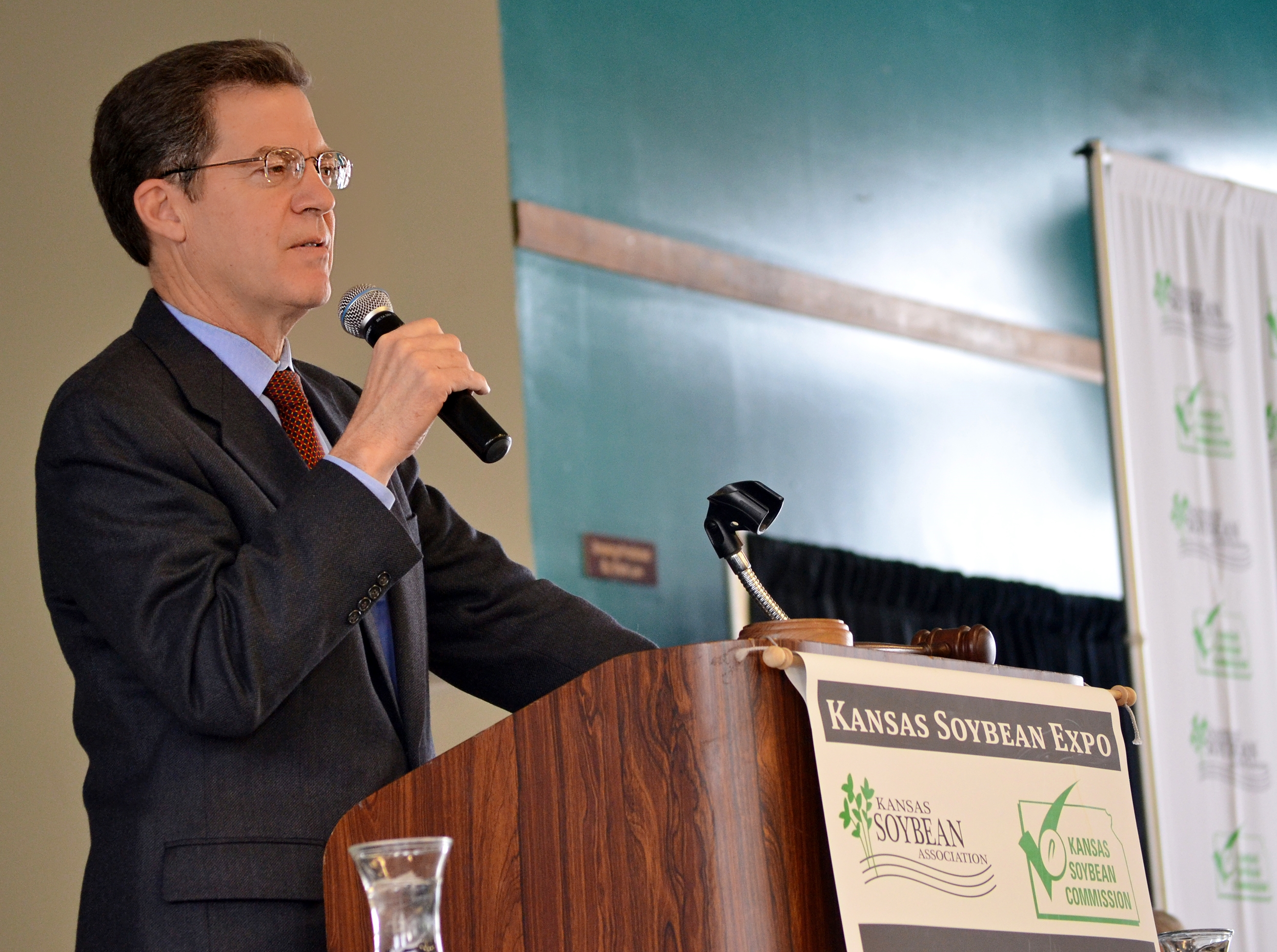
Brownback at the Kansas Soybean Expo 2014

As governor he urged a flattening of the income tax to spur economic growth in Kansas. In December 2005, Brownback advocated using Washington, DC, as a laboratory for a flat tax.

=== Evolution ===
Brownback has stated that he is a devout believer in a higher power and rejects macroevolution as an exclusive explanation for the development over time of new species from older ones. Brownback favors giving teachers the freedom to use intelligent design to critique evolutionary theory as part of the Teach the Controversy approach:

There's intelligence involved in the overall of creation ... I don't think we're really at the point of teaching this in the classroom. I think what we passed in the U.S. Senate in 2002 the Santorum Amendment is really what we should be doing, and that is that you teach the controversy, you teach what is fact is fact, and what is theory is theory, and you move from that proceedings, rather than from teaching some sort of different thought. And this, I really think that's the area we should concentrate on at the present time, is teaching the controversy.

— Senator Sam Brownback, Larry King Live, CNN, August 23, 2005

Brownback spoke out against the denial of tenure at Iowa State University to astronomer Guillermo Gonzalez, a proponent of intelligent design, saying "such an assault on academic freedom does not bode well for the advancement of true science."

=== Health care ===
Brownback opposes government-funded elective abortions in accordance with the Hyde Amendment. He has been a strong supporter of legislation to establish a national childhood cancer database and an increase in funding for autism research. Brownback supports negotiating bulk discounts on Medicare drug benefits to reduce prices. In 2007, Senators Brownback and Sherrod Brown (D-OH) sponsored an amendment to the Food and Drug Administration Amendments Act of 2007. The amendment created a prize as an incentive for companies to invest in new drugs and vaccines for neglected tropical diseases. It awards a transferable "Priority Review Voucher" to any company that obtains approval for a treatment for a neglected tropical disease. The prize was initially proposed by Duke University faculty Henry Grabowski, Jeffrey Moe, and David Ridley in their 2006 Health Affairs paper: "Developing Drugs for Developing Countries."

Brownback has supported a bill that would introduce price transparency to the U.S. health care industry, as well as a bill which would require the disclosure of Medicare payment rate information.

On December 16, 2006, Brownback gave an interview to the Christian Post, stating: "We can get to this goal of eliminating deaths by cancer in ten years."

=== Immigration ===
==== Senate record ====
Brownback had a Senate voting record that has tended to support higher legal immigration levels and strong refugee protection. Brownback was cosponsor of a 2005 bill of Ted Kennedy and John McCain's which would have created a legal path to citizenship for millions of illegal immigrants already present. On June 26, 2007, Brownback voted in favor of S. 1639, the Comprehensive Immigration Reform Act. Brownback supports increasing numbers of legal immigrants, building a fence on Mexican border, and the reform bill "if enforced." While he initially supported giving guest workers a path to citizenship, Brownback eventually voted "Nay" on June 28, 2007. Brownback has said that he supports immigration reform because the Bible says to welcome the stranger.

==== Record as governor ====
On April 25, 2016, Brownback issued executive orders barring state agencies from facilitating refugee resettlement from Syria and other majority-Muslim countries, in concert with the federal Office of Refugee Resettlement (ORR). He maintained they presented security risks, and his decision entirely removed Kansas from the program. The ORR served notice that it would instead work directly with local refugee resettlement organizations. Kansas was the first state to withdraw from the federal refugee resettlement program.

As a result of Brownback's action, Kansas lost about $2.2 million annually that had been provided to support resettlement agencies. The state had been working with three such agencies, among them Catholic Charities of Northeast Kansas, in making appropriate placements. In the seven months preceding his order, 354 refugees were resettled in Kansas, with 13 Syrians placed in the Wichita or Kansas City areas in the previous 16 months. Representative Jim Ward from Wichita called Brownback's announcement "a distraction", intended solely for political purposes, as Kansas faced a $290 million budget deficit.

=== Iraq ===
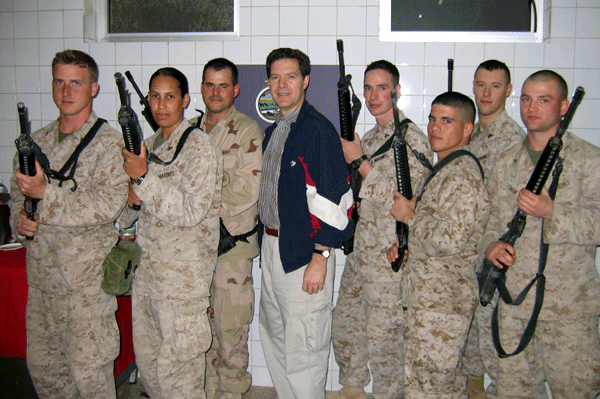
Brownback posing with U.S. Marines in Iraq

Brownback supported a political surge coupled with the military surge of 2007 in Iraq and opposed the Democratic Party's strategy of timed withdrawal:

It does mean that there must be bipartisan agreement for our military commitment on Iraq. We cannot fight a war with the support of only one political party. And it does mean that the parties in Iraq – Sunni, Shi'a and Kurds – must get to a political agreement, to a political equilibrium. I think most people agree that a cut and run strategy does not serve our interest at all, nor those of the world, nor those of the region, nor those of the Iraqi people. So I invite my colleagues, all around, particularly on the other side of the aisle, to indicate what level of commitment they can support.

— Senator Sam Brownback, U.S. Senate floor speech, January 16, 2007

In May 2007, Brownback stated: "We have not lost war; we can win by pulling together". He voted Yes on authorizing use of military force against Iraq, voted No on requiring on-budget funding for Iraq, not emergency funding and voted No on redeploying troops out of Iraq by July 2007. He has also condemned anti-Muslim bigotry in name of anti-terrorism.

On June 7, 2007, Brownback voted against the Habeas Corpus Restoration Act of 2007 when that bill came up for a vote in the Senate Judiciary Committee, on which Brownback sat. (The bill was passed out of the committee by a vote of 11 to 8.) The bill aims to restore habeas corpus rights revoked by the Military Commissions Act of 2006.

=== Israel and the Palestinian Territories ===
Brownback at the December 2007 AIPAC Policy Conference

In October 2007, Brownback announced his support for a plan designed by Benny Elon, then-chairman of Israel's far-right-wing National Union/National Religious Party (NU/NRP) alliance. Elon's positions included dismantling the Palestinian National Authority and Hamas and rejecting a two-state solution. The plan calls for the complete annexation of the West Bank by Israel, and the deportation of its massive majority Arab population to a new Palestinian state to be created within present-day Jordan, against that latter country's historic opposition.

=== LGBT issues ===
In 1996, as a member of the House of Representatives, Brownback voted for the Defense of Marriage Act, which defined marriage for purposes of federal law as the union between a man and a woman. Brownback has stated that he believes homosexuality to be immoral as a violation of both Catholic doctrine and natural law. He has voted against gay rights, receiving zeros in four scorecards between 2002 and 2008 as a U.S. senator from the Human Rights Campaign. He opposes both same-sex marriage and same-sex civil unions. He opposes adding sexual orientation and gender identity to federal hate crime laws. He has declined to state a position on homosexual adoption, although a candidate for chair of the Kansas Republican Party claims he was blackballed by political operatives affiliated with Brownback for not opposing homosexual adoption. Brownback supported "don't ask, don't tell," the U.S. government's ban on openly homosexual people in the military. Brownback has associated with organizations such as the Family Research Council and American Family Association.

In 2003, Brownback worked with Alliance for Marriage and Traditional Values Coalition to introduce a Senate bill containing the Federal Marriage Amendment, a proposed amendment to the United States Constitution that would federally prohibit same-sex marriage in the United States. The bill was a response to Goodridge v. Department of Public Health, the Massachusetts state court decision finding that same-sex couples had the right to marry in Massachusetts. In reaction to the Goodridge decision, Brownback stated that same-sex marriage threatened the health of American families and culture.

In 2006, Brownback blocked the confirmation of federal judicial nominee Janet T. Neff because she had attended a same-sex commitment ceremony. At first, he agreed to lift the block only if Neff would recuse herself from all cases involving same-sex unions. Brownback later dropped his opposition. Neff was nominated to the United States District Court for the Western District of Michigan by President George W. Bush on March 19, 2007, to a seat vacated David McKeague and was confirmed by a vote of 83-4 by the Senate on July 9, 2007. She received her commission on August 6, 2007.

In April 2011, Brownback began work on a Kansas government program to promote marriage, in part through grants to faith-based and secular social service organizations. In June 2011, the administration revised contract expectations for social work organizations to promote married mother-father families. It explained the change as benefiting children.

In January 2012, Brownback did not include Kansas's sodomy law in a list of unenforced and outdated laws that the legislature should repeal. Gay rights advocates had asked his administration to recommend its repeal because the law has been unenforceable since the Supreme Court's Lawrence v. Texas decision in 2003.

In February 2012, the Brownback administration supported a religious freedom bill that would have stopped cities, school districts, universities, and executive agencies from having nondiscrimination laws or policies that covered sexual orientation or gender identity.

In 2013, after oral arguments in United States v. Windsor, the U.S. Supreme Court case striking down part of the Defense of Marriage Act, Brownback publicly reaffirmed his opposition to same-sex marriage.

In 2014, the U.S. Supreme Court denied petitions to review several federal appellate decisions overturning state bans on same-sex marriage. The court's actions favored repeal of Kansas's ban on same-sex marriage because two of the appeals (Kitchen v. Herbert and Bishop v. Oklahoma) originated in the United States Court of Appeals for the Tenth Circuit, which includes Kansas. In response, Brownback defended Kansas's same-sex marriage ban as being supported by a majority of Kansas voters and criticized "activist judges" for "overruling" the people of Kansas.

On February 10, 2015, Brownback issued an executive order rescinding protections for lesbian, gay, bisexual, and transgender state workers that was put into place by then-Gov. Kathleen Sebelius eight years previously. The ACLU generally characterized his actions as being "religious freedom to discriminate."

=== Stem cell research ===
Brownback supports adult stem cell research and cord blood stem cells. Brownback appeared with three children adopted from in vitro fertilization clinics to coincide with a Senate debate over the Cord Blood Stem Cell Act of 2005 to show his support for the bill and adult stem cell research.

=== Other issues ===
On June 15, 2006, President George W. Bush signed into law the Broadcast Decency Enforcement Act of 2005 sponsored by Brownback, a former broadcaster himself. The new law stiffened the penalties for each violation of the Act. The Federal Communications Commission will be able to impose fines in the amount of $325,000 for each violation by each station that violates decency standards. The legislation raised the fine by tenfold.

On September 3, 1997, Meredith O'Rourke, an employee of Kansas firm Triad Management Services, was deposed by the Senate Committee on Governmental Affairs regarding her activities and observations while providing services for the company relative to fund raising and advertising for Brownback. The deposition claims that Triad circumvented existing campaign finance laws by channeling donations through Triad, and also bypassed the campaign law with Triad running 'issue ads' during Brownback's first campaign for the Senate.

Brownback has said he does not believe there is an inherent right to privacy in the U.S. Constitution. He has, however, expressed disapproval of George W. Bush's assertions on the legality of the NSA wiretapping program.

Brownback introduced into the Senate a resolution (Senate Joint Resolution 4) calling for the United States to apologize for past mistreatment of Native Americans.

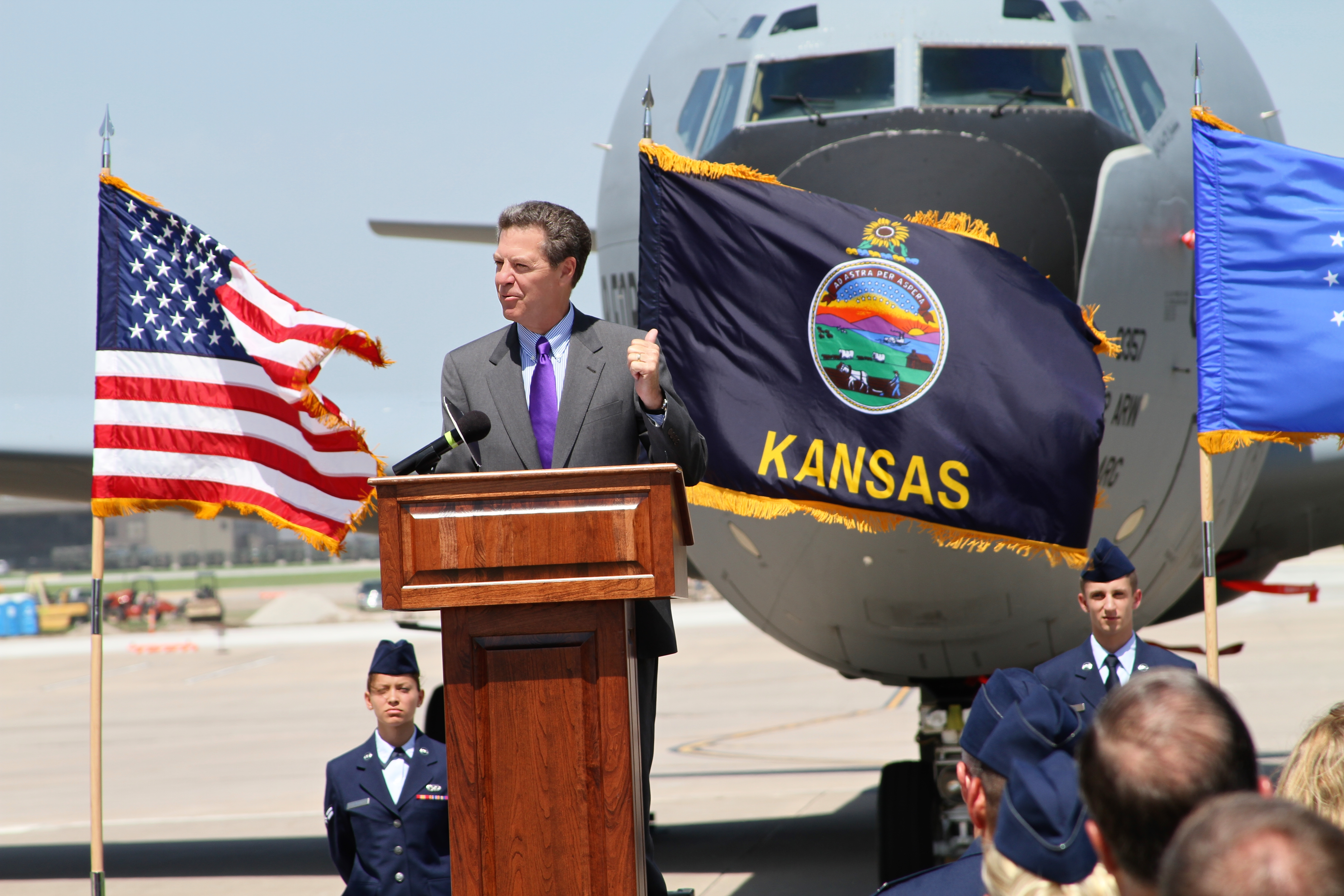
Governor Sam Brownback makes remarks at a ground breaking ceremony at McConnell Air Force Base.

Brownback was responsible for introducing the Senate's version of a bill that would successfully establish the National Museum of African American History and Culture.

Brownback has advocated for closer relations between the United States and Armenia, citing the need to defend the country from aggression by Azerbaijan. In a 2023 Washington Times opinion piece, the former ambassador called for Israel to also support Armenia due to the two nations' shared backgrounds as Judeo-Christian nations populated by ethnic groups that have been the victims of genocides despite geopolitical tensions. On April 24, 2024, Brownback called for sanctions against Azerbaijan and that the United States "can’t let a repeat of 1915 happen again on our watch" at an Armenian Genocide Remembrance Day rally in front of the White House.

== Relationship with Koch family ==
Throughout his Senate career, Brownback's principal campaign donors were the politically influential libertarian Koch brothers of Kansas, and their enterprises, including Kansas-based Koch Industries—and Brownback was one of the candidates most-heavily funded by the Kochs' campaign donations. Over the course of his political career, they donated hundreds of thousands of dollars to his campaigns.

Brownback's signature tax and regulatory policies coincide tightly with the Kochs' position on those issues. It was crafted with the assistance of the Koch-backed American Legislative Exchange Council (ALEC) and Brownback's first Budget Director, Steve Anderson. Anderson was a former Koch employee who previously worked at the Kochs' principal political organization, the libertarian think-tank Americans for Prosperity (AFP), developing a "model budget" for Kansas, until his appointment as Brownback's first budget director. Anderson remained Brownback's budget director for three years, before returning to a Koch-linked think tank, the Kansas Policy Institute.

Brownback also hired the wife of a Koch-enterprise executive as his spokesperson.

Brownback, however, has denied that the Kochs have an undue influence in Kansas government, and analysts have noted key differences between Brownback and the Kochs in two of Brownback's main gubernatorial policy areas:

- social issues: (on abortion, Brownback is pro-life, the Kochs pro-choice; Brownback opposes various LGBT rights, the libertarian Kochs accept them); and
- renewable energy standards for Kansas, which promote renewable energy (supported by Brownback; opposed by the Kochs, whose chief business is the fossil-fuel industry).

== Personal life ==
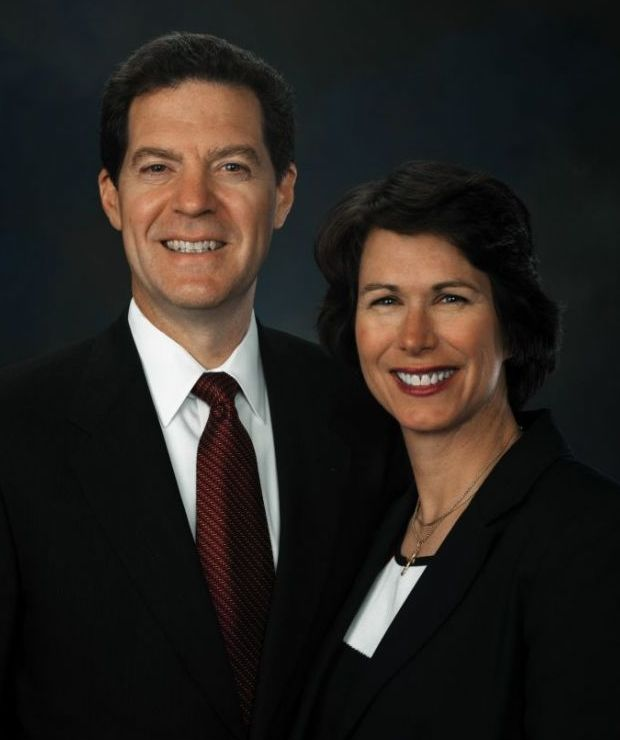
Brownback with his wife, Mary, during his tenure in the US Senate

Brownback is married to the former Mary Stauffer, whose family owned and operated Stauffer Communications until its sale in 1995. They have five children: Abby, Andy, Elizabeth, Mark, and Jenna. Two of their children are adopted. A former evangelical Christian, Brownback converted to Catholicism in 2002 and is associated with the conservative denominational organization, Opus Dei. In 2017, Brownback stated that he sometimes attends an evangelical church with his family.

== Electoral history ==
=== U.S. House of Representatives ===
1994 Kansas's 2nd congressional district Republican primary election results
Party	Candidate	Votes	%
Republican	Sam Brownback	35,415	48.3
Republican	Bob Bennie	26,008	35.5
Republican	Joe Hume	11,872	16.2
Total votes		73,295	100.0

Results, 1994 Kansas's 2nd congressional district elections:
Year	Democratic	Votes	Pct	Republican	Votes	Pct	Overall turnout
1994	John W. Carlin	71,025	34.4%	Sam Brownback	135,725	65.6%	206,750

=== U.S. Senator ===
1996 United States Senate special election in Kansas: Republican primary results
Year	Incumbent	Votes	Pct	Challenger	Votes	Pct	Challenger	Votes	Pct	Overall turnout
1996	Sheila Frahm (incumbent)	142,487	41.6%	Sam Brownback	187,914	54.8%	Christina Campbell-Cline	12,378	3.6%	342,779

1996 United States Senate special election in Kansas: general election results
Year	Democratic	Votes	Pct	Republican	Votes	Pct	Reform	Votes	Pct	Overall turnout
1996	Jill Docking	461,344	43.3%	Sam Brownback	574,021	53.9%	Donald R. Klaassen	29,351	2.8%	1,064,716

U.S. Senate elections in Kansas (Class III): results 1998–2004
Year	Democratic	Votes	Pct	Republican	Votes	Pct	Libertarian	Votes	Pct	Reform	Votes	Pct	Overall turnout
1998	Paul Feleciano	229,718	31.6%	Sam Brownback (incumbent)	474,639	65.3%	Tom Oyler	11,545	1.6%	Alvin Bauman	11,334	1.6%	727,236
2004	Lee Jones	310,337	27.5%	Sam Brownback (incumbent)	780,863	69.2%	Steven A. Rosile	21,842	1.9%	George Cook	15,980	1.4%	1,129,022

=== Governor of Kansas ===
2010 Kansas gubernatorial election: Republican primary result
Party	Candidate	Votes	%
Republican	Sam Brownback	263,920	82.1
Republican	Joan Heffington	57,160	17.8
Total votes		321,080	100.0

2010 Kansas gubernatorial election
Party	Candidate	Votes	%
Republican	Sam Brownback – Jeff Colyer	530,760	63.28
Democratic	Tom Holland – Kelly Kultala	270,166	32.21
Libertarian	Andrew Gray – Stacey Davis	22,460	2.68
Reform	Ken Cannon – Dan Faubion	15,397	1.84
Total votes		838,790	100.0
Republican gain from Democratic			

2014 Kansas gubernatorial election: Republican primary result
Party	Candidate	Votes	%
Republican	Sam Brownback (incumbent)	166,687	63.2
Republican	Jennifer Winn	96,907	36.7
Total votes		263,594	100.0

2014 Kansas gubernatorial election
Party	Candidate	Votes	%
Republican	Sam Brownback (incumbent) – Jeff Colyer (incumbent)	433,196	49.82
Democratic	Paul Davis – Jill Docking	401,100	46.13
Libertarian	Keen A. Umbehr – Josh Umbehr	35,206	4.05
Total votes		869,502	100.00

== See also ==
- How Democracy Works Now: Twelve Stories
- United States immigration debate

U.S. House of Representatives
Preceded by Jim Slattery	Member of the U.S. House of Representatives from Kansas's 2nd congressional district 1995–1996	Succeeded by Jim Ryun
Party political offices
Preceded by Bob Dole	Republican nominee for U.S. senator from Kansas (Class 3); 1996, 1998, 2004	Succeeded by Jerry Moran
Preceded by Jim Barnett	Republican nominee for Governor of Kansas; 2010, 2014	Succeeded by Kris Kobach
U.S. Senate
Preceded by Sheila Frahm	U.S. Senator (Class 3) from Kansas; 1996–2011; Served alongside: Nancy Kassebaum, Pat Roberts	Succeeded by Jerry Moran
Preceded by Chris Smith	Chair of the Joint Helsinki Commission; 2005–2007	Succeeded by Alcee Hastings
Political offices
Preceded by Mark Parkinson	Governor of Kansas; 2011–2018	Succeeded by Jeff Colyer
Diplomatic posts
Preceded by David Saperstein	United States Ambassador-at-Large for International Religious Freedom; 2018–2021	Succeeded by Rashad Hussain
U.S. order of precedence (ceremonial)
Preceded by Dan Coats as Former U.S. Senator	Order of precedence of the United States as Former U.S. Senator	Succeeded by Joe Manchin as Former U.S. Senator
