= Patricia Sloop =

American politician

Member of the Kansas House of Representatives from the 88th district
- In office 2013–2014
- Preceded by: Jim Ward
- Succeeded by: Joseph Scapa

Personal details
- Born: 1940 or 1941
- Party: Democratic
- Education: Wichita State University (B.A.); University of Kansas (M.A.)

Patricia M. Sloop (born 1940 or 1941) is an American politician who served in the Kansas House of Representatives as a Democrat from the 88th district for one term, from 2013 to 2014.

The Wichita Eagle described Sloop as a "political newcomer" when she first ran for the state legislature; she had worked as a social worker and professor before retiring and entering politics. The 88th district was an open seat following redistricting; Sloop won a relatively easy victory in the primary election, and then defeated Republican Joseph Scapa 53% to 47%. In 2014, Sloop ran for re-election, but faced a rematch with Scapa and lost narrowly with 49.8% of the vote.
