= Joseph Scapa =

American politician

Member of the Kansas House of Representatives from the 87th district
- In office 2011–2013
- Preceded by: Raj Goyle
- Succeeded by: Mark Kahrs

Member of the Kansas House of Representatives from the 88th district
- In office 2015–2017
- Preceded by: Patricia Sloop
- Succeeded by: Elizabeth Bishop

Personal details
- Born: March 18, 1974 (age 52)
- Party: Republican
- Spouse: Melissa E. Scapa

Joseph Brian Scapa (born March 18, 1974) is an American politician who served in the Kansas House of Representatives as a Republican from 2011 to 2016.

He was originally elected in the 87th district in 2010, facing no opposition in the primary and winning a relatively easy general election victory 65% to 35% over Democrat Om Chauhan.

In 2012, redistricting changed district lines and Scapa ran in the 88th district. He once again faced no opposition in the primary, but this time lost the general election in a narrow 53%-47% race to Patricia Sloop. In 2014, Scapa made a comeback, challenging Sloop again and winning with 50.2% of the vote. He ran for re-election in 2016, but lost to Democrat Elizabeth Bishop, in his final election as of 2023.
