= Raj Goyle =

American politician

Member of the Kansas House of Representatives from the 87th district
- In office January 8, 2007 – January 10, 2011
- Preceded by: Bonnie Huy
- Succeeded by: Joseph Scapa

Personal details
- Born: Rajeev Kumar Goyle; June 9, 1975 (age 51) Cleveland, Ohio, U.S.
- Party: Democratic
- Spouse: Monica Arora
- Education: Duke University (BA); Harvard University (JD)
- Website: Campaign website

Rajeev Kumar Goyle (born June 9, 1975) is a Democratic politician who lives in New York. He previously represented the 87th District in the Kansas House of Representatives from 2007 to 2011. He was the 2010 Democratic nominee for Kansas's 4th congressional district. He serves as co-chair of the 5BORO Institute in New York City. He ran unsuccessfully in the 2026 Democratic primary for New York State Comptroller.

== Early life, education and career ==
Goyle was born in Cleveland, Ohio, to Vimal and Krishan Goyle, physicians who immigrated from Bathinda, India, in 1971. The family moved to Wichita, Kansas, when he was nine months old. He attended Wichita Collegiate School, where he was student body president and valedictorian.

Goyle earned a B.A. from Duke University and a J.D. from Harvard Law School, where he was a member of the Harvard Legal Aid Bureau. He later lectured at Wichita State University.

=== Early activities ===
As a teenager, Goyle helped organize a community recycling initiative and wrote for the Wichita Eagle. During college and law school he interned with public-interest and political organizations and helped found a small technology venture with classmates.

== Kansas House of Representatives ==
Goyle was a member of the following committees:

- Taxation
- Vision 2020
- Veterans, Military and Homeland Security (Ranking Member)
- Judiciary

Goyle wrote the Kansas Funeral Privacy Act and introduced it on his first day in office, which includes the establishment of a 150-foot buffer zone around funerals one hour before, during and two hours after the end of a service to prevent protestors from engaging in public demonstration. "This bill is designed to protect a constitutional right to privacy during the funeral of a family that's mourning a loved one," Goyle said. This was done in reaction to members of the Westboro Baptist Church picketing at the funerals of military casualties of the Iraq invasion and occupation. It became effective on April 10, 2008.

Goyle said third-party groups who attempt to influence the outcome of elections should be required to publicly disclose information about their finances. Under an amendment offered by Goyle, groups spending more than $500 a year on issue advertisements naming a particular state or local candidate 30 days before a primary or 60 days before a general election would be subject to reveal information about their spending and donors in financial reports being filed with the state. The amendment was opposed by conservatives as a violation of free speech.

Seven counties in Kansas have no pharmacy, and another 30 have only one each. State Rep. Mike O'Neal, R-Hutchinson, proposed an admendent for University of Kansas pharmacy school expansion, which Goyle supported saying, "This is a priority not just for KU, Lawrence and Wichita, but for the whole state."

Goyle successfully introduced House Bill 2374, which draws down $69 million in federal stimulus dollars for the state's Unemployment Insurance Trust Fund. The legislation makes three revisions to the current unemployment insurance statute:

- Adopt an alternate wage base period to be used when an individual does not qualify for benefits using the standard wage base period.
- Provide benefits to workers seeking part-time employment to qualify for federal stimulus money.
- Extend unemployment insurance benefits to cover workers while they receive state-approved job training.

As a state legislator, he listed his priorities as "no free lunches from lobbyists, educating our children, reducing health care costs, real solutions on energy, fighting for immigration reform," and "helping small businesses." According to state ethics officials, Goyle and State Sen. David Wysong, R-Mission Hills, are state lawmakers who received no direct attention from lobbyists.

== 2010 U.S. Congressional campaign ==
In 2010, Goyle won the Democratic primary for Kansas’s 4th congressional district and faced Republican nominee Mike Pompeo, among others, in the general election. The race drew national attention; Pompeo later apologized after his campaign account promoted a tweet attacking Goyle’s background. Pompeo won the general election, 58%–36%.

== New York career ==
After the 2010 campaign, Goyle moved to New York City. In 2011 he joined the Rubin Foundation as a director working across philanthropy, policy, and operations.

In 2014 he co-founded Bodhala, a legal-technology and analytics company that applied data and AI to corporate legal spend. As CEO, he led the company through rapid growth; in September 2021 Bodhala was acquired by Onit, Inc., where it continued to operate as a subsidiary and Goyle served as a senior advisor.

== New York State Comptroller campaign ==
On September 22, 2025, Goyle announced that he would seek the office of New York State Comptroller in the 2026 election. He aimed to improve investment returns by "using best-in-class software to identify potential investments" and to invest funds in new affordable housing projects in the state. Goyle also proposed to divest from fossil fuel investments and from Palantir.

He lost to incumbent Tom DiNapoli.

== Personal life ==
Goyle married attorney Monica Kumari Arora, an attorney and daughter of retired public school teachers in Middletown, Orange County, New York, on July 24, 2004. They have two children and live in Lower Manhattan. After relocating to New York, Goyle’s parents moved to the same neighborhood.
