= Hugh D. Riordan =

American health activist )1932–2005)

- Born: May 7, 1932; Milwaukee, Wisconsin
- Died: January 7, 2005 (aged 72)
- Education: University of Wisconsin; University of Wisconsin Medical School
- Known for: Founding the Riordan Clinic with Olive W. Garvey, creating the Riordan Protocol for Intraveneous Vitamin C
- Medical career
- Profession: Doctor of Medicine (MD)
- Institutions: St. Francis Regional Medical Center, St. Joseph Medical Center, Wesley Medical Center, Riordan Clinic
- Sub-specialties: Orthomolecular Medicine, Nutrition
- Research: Intravenous Vitamin C and Cancer

Hugh Desiax Riordan M.D. (May 7, 1932 – January 7, 2005) was an American psychiatrist and researcher. He was the co-founder and, until his death, the director of the Olive W. Garvey Center for the Improvement of Human Functioning (now called the Riordan Clinic). He was best known for his belief that nutrition and vitamins are effective treatments for diseases such as cancer. This approach to patient care is known as orthomolecular medicine and is dismissed by the mainstream medical community.

== Biography ==
Dr. Hugh Riordan was born in Milwaukee, Wisconsin on May 7, 1932. He received his Bachelor of Science from the University of Wisconsin in 1954 and proceeded with his MD in 1957 specializing in psychiatry. Completing his formal training with an internship at St. Francis Regional Medical Center led to the establishment of his home in Wichita, KS. Riordan had staff positions at St. Francis Regional Medical Center, St. Joseph Medical Center and Wesley Medical Center. He would later co-found, with Olive W. Garvey, the Center for the Improvement of Human Functioning International, Inc. in Wichita, KS. During his time at the center, he also served as Clinical Assistant Professor in the Department of Preventative Medicine at the University of Kansas Medical Center and at the University of Puerto Rico School of Medicine in San Juan.

Over the course of his career, he wrote four books, several papers and many publications on the topic of medicine. He was a recipient of the 2002 Linus Pauling Award from the American College for Advancement in Medicine.

Riordan died unexpectedly on January 7, 2005.

== Views and controversy ==
Riordan's High dose vitamin C injections have been met with controversy. Riordan has also been criticized for his work with orthomolecular medicine, a type of alternative medicine.

== Books ==
1. Hugh Desaix Riordan M.D. (1988). Medical Mavericks, Vol. 1. Wichita, Kansas: Bio-Communications Press. ISBN 0-942333-07-1.
2. Hugh Desaix Riordan M.D. (1989). Medical Mavericks, Vol. 2. Wichita, Kansas: Bio-Communications Press. ISBN 0-942333-09-8.
3. Hugh Desaix Riordan M.D. (1992). Desafiando a Medicina, Os Desbravadores que Derrubaram os Dogmas da Saude. Gaia, Brazil.
4. Hugh Desaix Riordan M.D. (2005). Medical Mavericks, Vol. 3. Wichita, Kansas: Bio-Communications Press. ISBN 0-942333-13-6.

== See also ==
- Alternative cancer therapies
