= Carolyn Bridges =

American politician

Member of the Kansas House of Representatives from the 83rd district
- In office 2013 – December 20, 2015
- Preceded by: Jo Ann Potoroff
- Succeeded by: Henry Helgerson

Personal details
- Born: August 18, 1946 (age 79)
- Party: Democratic

Carolyn L. Bridges (born August 18, 1946) is an American politician who served in the Kansas House of Representatives as a Democrat from the 83rd district from 2013 until the end of 2015.

Bridges was originally elected in the November 2012 elections, where she defeated Republican Tim Garvey 58% to 42%. She was re-elected in 2014 by a similar margin, but resigned her seat on December 20, 2015. Henry Helgerson was appointed to replace her.
