= Elizabeth Bishop (politician) =

American politician

Member of the Kansas House of Representatives from the 88th district
- In office January 9, 2017 – June 2021
- Preceded by: Joseph Scapa
- Succeeded by: Chuck Schmidt

Personal details
- Born: June 4, 1943 (age 83) Clintwood, Virginia, U.S.
- Party: Democratic
- Spouse: Darrel
- Children: 5
- Education: Wichita State University

Elizabeth Bishop (born June 4, 1943) is an American politician who served in the Kansas House of Representatives from the 88th district from 2017 through 2021.

She resigned her seat to allow Democratic committeepersons from her district to choose her successor. On June 16, 2021, they picked Chuck Schmidt, a retired teacher, to succeed her.
