= Bonnie Huy =

American politician

Member of the Kansas House of Representatives from the 87th district
- In office January 8, 2001 – January 8, 2007
- Preceded by: Michael Farmer
- Succeeded by: Raj Goyle

Personal details
- Born: October 19, 1935 Boise, Idaho, U.S.
- Died: May 9, 2013 (aged 77)
- Party: Republican
- Spouse: John Huy
- Children: 2

Bonnie Huy (October 19, 1935 – May 9, 2013) was an American politician from Kansas.

Born in Boise, Idaho, Huy worked in the aviation industry before retiring and entering into politics.

She served in the Kansas House of Representatives 2001–2007, as a Republican, from Wichita, Kansas.

She was married to John Huy. She died on May 9, 2013, at age 77.
