= Roger Elliott (politician) =

American politician (1949–2021)

Member of the Kansas House of Representatives from the 87th district
- In office 2017–2018
- Preceded by: Mark Kahrs
- Succeeded by: Renee Erickson

Personal details
- Born: October 20, 1949 Wichita, Kansas, U.S.
- Died: November 14, 2021 (aged 72) Manhattan, Kansas, U.S.
- Party: Republican
- Spouse: Nancy Nachtigall (m. 1982)
- Children: 3
- Education: Baker University; Wichita State University

Roger A. Elliott (October 20, 1949 – November 14, 2021) was an American politician who served in the Kansas House of Representatives as a Republican from the 87th district for one term, in 2017 and 2018.

Elliott was born in Wichita, Kansas, where he graduated from high school in 1967. He attended Baker University for a time, and served in the Kansas Air National Guard; he transferred colleges and graduated from Wichita State University in 1976. He spent his career in banking, retiring as a Senior Vice President at CornerBank in 2012. In 2016, Elliott was elected to the Kansas House from the 87th district. He served for one term, and declined to run for re-election in 2018. Elliott died in 2021.
