= Nancy Cartonio =

American singer-songwriter

Lil McGill
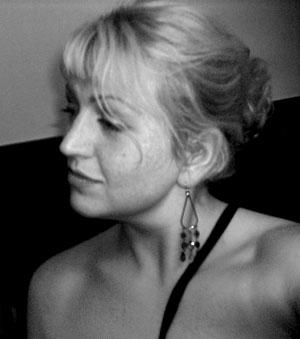
- Lil McGill in 2007

Background information
- Also known as: Naenerys Cargaryen, Mother Of Hooligans
- Born: February 21, 1977 (age 48); Wichita, Kansas, US
- Genres: Indie, adult contemporary, pop, reggae, progressive folk
- Occupation(s): Musician, producer, businesswoman
- Instrument(s): vocals, guitars, keyboards
- Years active: 1990s–present
- Labels: Independent, CD Baby
- Website: https://lilmcgillmusic.com/home

Lil McGill (born Nancy Cartonio) aka Naenerys Cargaryen, (born February 21, 1977, Wichita, Kansas, USA) is a folk musician, songwriter, and music producer living in Portland, Maine.

== History ==
Cartonio has been a musician since she was a child. Cartonio's band "Dear Liza" was very popular in the Northeast United States during the 1990s. She also performed as a duo with her friend Heather Caston for many years. She is on the board of directors of the libertarian think tank The Council of Twelve, the Maine Music Association, and the Maine Songwriters' Association. Cartonio has been featured on 98.9 WCLZ FM in Portland, Maine and included in the Boston Phoenix newspaper. Internationally, she has charted on numerous folk internet charts and receives rotation on internet radio daily. She quietly released an E-cookbook under the name Mother Of Hooligans in 2017.

== Discography ==
- 2023- Dead and Dying
- 2023- The Long Night
- 2023- high school drama
- 2019- Caribbean Sun (SolNjha ft Lil McGill)
- 2017- Ridiculous (Lil McGill ft Mr Gadget)
- 2008- Aquatronic (Aquatronic)
- 2007- Life and Love (Nancy Cartonio)
- 2001- Birthday mixtape (Nan Car)
- 1995- The Haunting of Bill's House on Wolcott Street mixtape (Dear Liza)
- 1991- This is Aggressive Folk (Original Motion Picture Soundtrack) (Dear Liza)

== Appearances ==
- SOLNJHA ft Lil McGill – 2019
- Lost Houses – 2003, Jason Spooner (piano & backing vocals)
- Naked in Portland (soundtrack) – 2003, Jason Wilkins aka Figure Models (lead vocals)
