= Mike Petersen (Kansas politician) =

American politician (born 1960)

Member of the Kansas Senate from the 28th district
- Incumbent
- Assumed office January 10, 2005
- Preceded by: Henry Helgerson

Personal details
- Born: October 5, 1960 (age 65)
- Party: Republican
- Spouse: Shelby Petersen
- Children: 2
- Profession: Industrial electrician

Soren M. Petersen (born October 5, 1960) is an American Republican politician who serves in the Kansas Senate, representing the 28th district since 2005.

== Committee assignments ==
Petersen serves on these legislative committees:

- Joint Committee on Information Technology (chair)
- Transportation (chair)
- Utilities (vice-chair)
- Joint Committee on Kansas Security
- Clean Power Plan Implementation Study Committee
- Judiciary
- Telecommunications Study Committee
- Assessment and Taxation
- Transportation and Public Safety Subcommittee, Ways and Means

== Elections ==
=== 2012 ===
Petersen was unopposed in the 2012 Republican primary, winning 2,632 votes. He defeated Democratic nominee Keith Humphrey by a margin of 9,853 to 7,957 in the general election — a 52.7- to 47.3-percent margin.

=== 2016 ===
Petersen faced Jo Hillman in the 2016 Republican primary, winning with a margin of 74% to 25% of the vote. In the general election, he defeated Keith Humphrey once again, winning by a margin of 9,915 to 9,353 votes.

== Personal life ==
He is an industrial electrician from Wichita, and is married to Shelby Petersen.
