= Kansas's 28th Senate district =

American legislative district

Kansas's 28th State Senate district
Senator
| Mike Petersen; R–Wichita |
- Demographics: 64% White; 7% Black; 19% Hispanic; 5% Asian; 1% Native American; 4% Other
- Population (2018): 70,786

Kansas's 28th Senate district is one of 40 districts in the Kansas Senate. It has been represented by Republican Mike Petersen since 2005.

== Geography ==
District 28 covers southern Wichita and its immediate suburbs in Sedgwick County, including Oaklawn-Sunview and parts of Derby.

The district is located entirely within Kansas's 4th congressional district, and overlaps with the 81st, 82nd, 83rd, 86th, 88th, 96th, 97th, and 98th districts of the Kansas House of Representatives.

== Recent election results ==
=== 2020 ===
2020 Kansas Senate election, District 28
| Party | Candidate | Votes | % |
|---|---|---|---|
| Republican | Mike Petersen (incumbent) | 11,895 | 53.7 |
| Democratic | Jim Ward | 10,250 | 46.3 |
| Total votes | | 22,145 | 100 |
| Republican hold | | | |

=== 2016 ===
2016 Kansas Senate election, District 28
Primary election
| Party | Candidate | Votes | % |
|---|---|---|---|
| Republican | Mike Petersen (incumbent) | 2,003 | 74.6 |
| Republican | Jo Hillman | 681 | 25.4 |
| Total votes | | 2,684 | 100 |
General election
| Republican | Mike Petersen (incumbent) | 9,915 | 51.5 |
| Democratic | Keith Humphrey | 9,353 | 48.5 |
| Total votes | | 19,268 | 100 |
| Republican hold | | | |

=== 2012 ===
2012 Kansas Senate election, District 28
| Party | Candidate | Votes | % |
|---|---|---|---|
| Republican | Mike Petersen (incumbent) | 9,853 | 52.7 |
| Democratic | Keith Humphrey | 8,852 | 47.3 |
| Total votes | | 18,705 | 100 |
| Republican hold | | | |

=== Federal and statewide results ===
| Year | Office | Results |
|---|---|---|
| 2020 | President | Trump 52.7 – 44.3% |
| 2018 | Governor | Kelly 48.9 – 39.4% |
| 2016 | President | Trump 53.5 – 38.4% |
| 2012 | President | Romney 53.3 – 44.0% |
