= Kansas African American Legislative Caucus =

African American Legislative Caucus

The Kansas African American Legislative Caucus, (formerly known as the Kansas Black Legislative Caucus), is an American political and educational organization. The Caucus is composed of seven African Americans elected to the Kansas Legislature.

== History ==
The Caucus was organized in March 1975 to foster greater participation of minority groups in the political process and enhance their awareness of critical political issues. Founding members of the Caucus include: Representatives Norman E. Justice, Clarence C. Love, Theo Cribbs, Eugene Anderson, and William K. Marshall, and Senator Billy Q. McCray.

== Current membership ==
List of officers:

District
Officers
Position
Dist. 89
Rep. Roderick Houston

Chair

Secretary
Dist. 44
Rep. Barbara Ballard
Treasurer

=== Members ===
- Kansas State Sen. Oletha Faust-Goudeau (D-Wichita)
- Kansas State Sen. David Haley (D-Kansas City)
- Kansas State Rep. Barbara Ballard (D-Lawrence)
- Kansas State Rep. Gail Finney (D-Wichita)
- Kansas State Rep. Broderick Henderson (D-Kansas City)
- Kansas State Rep. Roderick Houston (D-Wichita)
- Kansas State Rep. Valdenia Winn (D-Kansas City)
- Kansas State Rep. Ford Carr (D-Wichita)

== See also ==
- History of African Americans in Kansas
