= Black Caucus =

Black Caucus may refer to one of the following:

== United States ==
=== National ===
- Black Caucus of the American Library Association, an affiliate of the American Library Association for African American library professionals
- Congressional Black Caucus, a group made of most of the African American members of the United States Congress
- Congressional Black Caucus Foundation, an educational foundation
- National Black Caucus of State Legislators, an American political organization composed of African Americans in state legislatures

=== Individual states ===
- California Legislative Black Caucus
- Delaware Black Caucus
- Georgia Legislative Black Caucus
- Illinois Legislative Black Caucus
- Indiana Black Legislative Caucus
- Kansas African American Legislative Caucus
- Louisiana Legislative Black Caucus
- Legislative Black Caucus of Maryland
- Missouri Legislative Black Caucus
- Ohio Legislative Black Caucus
- Pennsylvania Legislative Black Caucus
- Virginia Legislative Black Caucus

=== Individual cities ===
- New York City Council Black, Latino and Asian (BLA) Caucus

== Others ==
- Black Caucus, a group of people at the centre of the Australian Black Power movement in the 1960s–1970s
