= Bonita Gooch =

American politician

- Gooch in 2009

Member-elect of the Kansas House of Representatives from the 84th district
- Assuming office January 2027
- Succeeding: Ford Carr

Personal details
- Born: August 15, 1955 (age 71) Wichita, Kansas, U.S.
- Party: Democratic
- Parent: U. L. Gooch (father)
- Education: University of Kansas (BA and MPA)

Bonita Gooch (born August 15, 1955) is an American businesswoman and politician. She initially worked as an urban management professional, including as assistant city manager of Delray Beach, Florida from April 1982 to January 1983. Returning to Wichita, she became owner-operator of The Community Voice, an African American newspaper based in Wichita. She is the Democratic member-elect of the Kansas House of Representatives from the 84th district.

== Early life and education ==
Gooch was born on August 15, 1955, in Wichita, Kansas. Her mother Dora was a schoolteacher, while her father U. L. Gooch was an aviation entrepreneur who served in the Kansas Senate. She attended Wichita North High School, graduating in 1973. At North, she was student body president, yearbook co-editor, and news editor of the student newspaper, and worked at a Macy's.

Gooch later studied at the University of Kansas, where she obtained her Bachelor of Arts degree in journalism at the William Allen White School of Journalism and Mass Communications before getting a Master of Public Administration degree in urban management.

== Career ==
Gooch became interested in journalism after she took a journalism course at North High, and stripped layouts at The Wichita Times, a local African American newspaper. Initially, she worked at KWCH as an intern, but found a career in journalism financially untenable. After finishing her education at KSU, she started her career as an urban management professional. She worked as an assistant to the city manager of Riviera Beach, as well as in other municipal governments in Fort Worth and Leavenworth, Kansas.

In April 1982, Gooch was hired as Delray Beach's first assistant city manager, beating out hundreds of applicants, and assumed the office on June 7, 1982. As assistant city manager, she was the municipal government's highest-ranking black woman, as well as their highest-ranking appointed Black official. She stepped down on January 21, 1983 to enter the travel industry.

Gooch was appointed alternate member of the West Palm Beach City Commission in June 1983, before being appointed full member in July 1983. In November 1983, she was hired by the South Bay City Commission to assist in the construction of a veterans hospital. She also ran a plant decoration business named A New Leaf, which once received a contract to decorate a new Palm Beach International Airport terminal, as well as a consultancy firm named B&G Inc.

=== Media career ===
On September 12, 1990, her brother Kerry L. Gooch was killed in an aviation accident. Hearing about this, she decided to move back to Wichita to reunite with her parents, which she eventually did in the mid-1990s. In November 1992, she co-founded Creative Concessions Inc, a newsagent's shop at Kansas City International Airport. In 1995, she bought The Community Voice, an African-American newspaper, from Billy McCray. Reportedly, Gooch was initially reluctant to involve herself in a return to journalism, stating "It's not something I probably would have ever ventured toward in my life. But I kind of felt like it was a calling".

Under Gooch's leadership, The Community Voice grew "into a trusted force across the state and in the Kansas City metro area". She also launched a general interest supplement named Scene. In 2001, The Wichita Eagle reported that the newspaper had so few staff that Gooch would "pick up more than half the writing, editing and design work" for both publications. However, she later grew the newspaper's size, increasing print circulation by four times, hiring more staff, and broadening its market into the entire state, including the Kansas City metropolitan area, by 2017.

In 1998, Gooch received a Kansas Press Association award for her writing with The Community Voice. In 1999, the Kansas Department of Commerce awarded her the Minority Advocate Award. She was inducted into the Kansas Newspaper Hall of Fame in 2023, stating that "as the owner of Kansas' only newspaper focused on the news and issues of Kansas' African-American community, Bonita proudly wears the title of community builder".

Gooch co-hosted The Community Voice Radio, a KDGS Sunday morning radio talk show centered on African-American issues. She was also a regular on KPTS' Kansas Week. She is also a member of the Kansas African American Affairs Commission.

=== Political career ===
In June 2026, Gooch announced that she would run in the 84th district for that year's election. She challenged Ford Carr in the primary, vaguely stating that her campaign is "the next step in a lifetime of service and advocacy"; she had filed on the filing deadline of June 1.

Gooch won the Democratic primary in August 2026, defeating Carr 70% to 30%. With no Republican running against her, she won the general election unopposed in November 2026.

== Personal life ==
Gooch lives in Wichita. She has a daughter.
