= Frank Gaines =

Frank Gaines may refer to:

- Frank D. Gaines (1934–2011), Kansas state legislator
- Frank S. Gaines (1890–1977), mayor of Berkeley, California, 1939–1943
- Frank Gaines (basketball) (born 1990), American basketball player
