= Eugene Anderson (politician) =

American politician

Member of the Kansas Senate from the 29th district
- In office 1985–1991
- Preceded by: Billy McCray
- Succeeded by: Jim Ward

Member of the Kansas House of Representatives from the 83rd district
- In office 1973–1976

Personal details
- Born: March 9, 1944 Thomasville, Georgia
- Died: July 2, 2024 (aged 80)
- Party: Democratic
- Spouse: Mamie Jewell Sapp
- Children: 3

Eugene Anderson (March 9, 1944 – July 2, 2024) was an African-American politician from Kansas who served as a member of both the Kansas House of Representatives and the Kansas Senate.

Anderson was born in Georgia. He served in the military after graduating high school, and eventually moved to Wichita. Before entering politics, Anderson worked as a brakeman for the Atchison, Topeka and Santa Fe Railway. In 1972, he ran for election to the Kansas House, eventually serving two terms there. From 1979 to 1983, he was chair of the Kansas Commission on Civil Rights, and also worked as an aide to U.S. Representative Dan Glickman.

In 1984, Anderson ran for the State Senate, winning his election for the 29th district. He won re-election in 1988, and resigned in November 1991. After his time in the State Senate, Anderson worked as a general contractor and owned a store specializing in business services.
