= Senator Corbin =

Senator Corbin may refer to:

- David R. Corbin (born 1944), Kansas State Senate
- Kevin Corbin (born 1960/61), North Carolina State Senate
- Kilmer B. Corbin (1919–1993), Texas State Senate
- Philip Corbin (manufacturer) (1824–1910), Connecticut State Senate
- Tom Corbin (born 1965), South Carolina State Senate
