= Senator McCray =

Senator McCray may refer to:

- Billy McCray (1927–2012), Kansas State Senate
- Cory McCray (born 1982), Maryland State Senate
