= Senator Gaines =

Senator Gaines may refer to:

- Frank D. Gaines (1934–2011), Kansas State Senate
- Matthew Gaines (1840–1900), Texas State Senate
- Richard M. Gaines (1802–1871), Arkansas State Senate
- Ted Gaines (born 1958), California State Senate
- William E. Gaines (1844–1912), Virginia State Senate
