= Senator Gooch =

Senator Gooch may refer to:

- Steve Gooch (born 1967), Georgia State Senate
- U. L. Gooch (1923–2021), Kansas State Senate
