= Donald Betts =

American politician

Member of the Kansas Senate from the 29th district
- In office January 13, 2004 – January 12, 2009
- Preceded by: U. L. Gooch
- Succeeded by: Oletha Faust-Goudeau

Member of the Kansas House of Representatives from the 84th district
- In office January 13, 2003 – January 13, 2004
- Preceded by: Jonathan Wells
- Succeeded by: Oletha Faust-Goudeau

Personal details
- Born: February 8, 1978 (age 48) Wichita, Kansas, U.S.
- Party: Democratic
- Spouse: Tania Betts
- Education: Friends University (B.A.); Monash University (J.D.)

Donald Betts, Jr. (born February 8, 1978) is a former Democratic member of the Kansas Senate, representing the 29th district from 2004 until 2009. He previously served in the Kansas House of Representatives from 2003 through 2004.

== Biography ==
Born in Wichita, Kansas, on February 8, 1978, Donald Betts Jr. attended elementary school in the Wichita area, where he spent much of his childhood. His political career began in the 2nd grade, when classmates elected him as the class representative at Hyde Elementary School.

At the age of ten, however, he moved with his mother and younger brother to North Las Vegas to unite with his grandfather the late Reverend I.W. Wilson of the True Love Missionary Baptist Church. Betts, his mother, and brother eventually moved to an inner city community quite unlike Las Vegas’s famous strip. Betts grew up outside all the glitz and glamor, where he witnessed violent criminal activity.”

Betts avoided the negative elements abounding in his community by focusing his attention on concerns closer to home. He still recalls his upstairs neighbor, Eliza Perkins, an elderly woman whom he often visited as a child, helping her around the house or just providing company.

Betts grew up in a single-parent household headed by his mother, Charmaine Betts. She struggled to provide for her two children and keep them on the “straight and narrow.” She remained a full-time parent for nearly ten years. When the boys were older, she worked at Macy’s, in a telemarketing firm, and even as a movie extra in such films as Vegas Vacation and Casino.

At the age of thirteen, Betts began the start of a career in public service by working with the Doolittle Tutorial Program, helping elementary school students with their homework. He later attended Clark High School, where constant gang activity forced him to focus not only on his education, but also on his security. The threat of violence went so far as to create the need for metal detectors and security cameras. Violence was not limited to the school building, however, but also occurred on the school bus. Betts eventually rode the city bus to school. Despite these problems, he remained very active at his high school, where he served on the drum squad and played the string bass in the orchestra.

Betts later transferred to the Advanced Technologies Academy (ATA), where a new and innovative approach to secondary education was developed. The goal at ATA was to train students for the right profession, offering seven program areas in fields such as law, banking, commerce, and technology. With the goal of becoming an attorney like his uncle Wendell, Betts graduated from the program with an emphasis in law. He stayed active while at ATA: he was elected president of the Law Club, was involved in the Kappa Leadership League, and participated in the Trial by Peers Program. He was also a recipient of the Principal’s Award.

After graduation, on a visit to his extended family in Wichita, Betts felt at home and decided to move back to Wichita to attend Friends University. While an undergraduate, he was involved in football, the NAACP, a vocal group (the “Singing Quakers”), and several bands, in which he played the string bass. He also became a member of Kappa Alpha Psi.

His start in elective office also began at Friends, when Betts was elected president of the Multicultural Student Association and became the first African-American student body president.

After graduation from Friends in 2002 with a degree in political science and history, Betts applied to law school but was not accepted. For the first time in his life, he felt that he had failed to overcome an obstacle and could find no other direction for his life. He worked as a counselor for a level six juvenile treatment facility and eventually persuaded the Wichita Alumni Chapter of Kappa Alpha Psi to restart the Kappa Leadership League program to provide leadership training to high school boys in Wichita.

He also decided to become politically active in the Democratic Party and was soon running for the Kansas State House of Representatives in the 84th District, the part of Wichita where he lived with his grandmother. He ran a small, grass roots campaign motivated by his strong personal desire to better serve and address the needs of his community. He walked door-to-door and talked with voters, put up yard signs, and learned to handle himself with the media. His efforts were rewarded in November 2002 when, at the age of 24, he was elected.

For most of the 2003 session, which ran from January through April and into May, Betts concentrated on learning the ways of the Kansas House, sharing an office with other representatives from the Wichita area and discussing bills and resolutions with his colleagues. Towards the middle of the session, he proposed an amendment to address the recurring problem of an increasing prison population by making rehabilitation an option to prison or jail time for first-time drug offenders. After he successfully shepherded it through the House, his colleagues discouraged his plan to propose the bill in the Senate, but Betts paid them no heed. He got to know the senators and lobbied hard to get support. As the session ended, he was gratified to see his amendment added to the bill, which was later signed into law by Governor Kathleen Sebelius.

As 2003 came to an end, however, Betts was presented with a new opportunity. U.L. “Rip” Gooch, the state senator for the district that included all of Betts’ House district, decided to retire. At 80, Gooch was the oldest senator serving. At first reluctant to throw his hat in the ring, Betts was eventually persuaded to give it a shot. He approached each committee member personally and eventually put together the necessary support to win, capturing the victory by one vote. On January 13, 2004, he was sworn in—as the youngest senator serving in the history of Kansas.

In his second session, he shepherded a bill to ban racial profiling through the Senate and House. After his re-election in 2004, he was no longer the lowest in seniority, but he still may be the youngest in age.

He was among the senators who voted for the compromise education bill during the 2005 Special Session. In 2006, he advocated for some changes to the racial profiling bill to make it tighter and easier to enforce, plus worked on a resolution recommending that Kansas’ public schools institute strict dress codes or mandate school uniforms. He also was active in pressing for the passage of Scruffy’s Law, which increased the punishment for intentional aggravated animal cruelty from a misdemeanor to a felony.

In 2007, Betts introduced and saw passed a bill to bring about divestment of the KPERS retirement funds from companies doing business in and with Sudan until such time as the Darfur genocide ends.

Betts was accepted to join the Leadership Kansas class of 2007. In addition to the many boards and organizations he belonged to, he is a strong believer in continuing education, so he pursued his master's degree at Friends University. In 2008 Senator Betts launched a bid for the Kansas Fourth District Congressional seat for United States Congress against 14-year incumbent Todd Tiahrt.

In 2008, Betts fulfilled the remainder of his term as a Kansas state senator and in 2009 moved to Australia to be with his wife Tania (a successful business woman and entrepreneur), after an unsuccessful bid for a seat in the United States Congress. In 2015, Betts enrolled to study law at Monash University law chambers.

In 2020, Betts became the first African American in Australia to complete a Juris Doctor degree from Monash University. Betts is the founder of the North American Australian Lawyers Alliance. In addition to his duties at Global Law Firm Norton Rose Fulbright Australia, he is also responsible for marketing and development at Australia's first Indigenous majority owned law firm, Jaramer Legal, under the directorship of Peter Cash (head of office at Norton Rose Fulbright Australia) and Bevan Mailman (managing partner at Jaramer Legal). Betts is an inaugural graduate of the 2019 class of the American Chamber of Commerce in Australia Global Leadership Academy.

Betts is a frequent guest on Australia television and radio programs as a commentator on U.S. politics and current events. He and his co-host Diana Elliott operate a podcast called Greenland the Podcast, where they explore the differences and similarities between the United States and Australia.
