= National Black Caucus of State Legislators =

American political organization

The National Black Caucus of State Legislators (NBCSL) is a bipartisan, membership organization composed of African Americans elected to state legislatures in the United States and its territories.

== Background ==
NBCSL was founded in 1977 after a group of about eighteen African American state legislators, attending the annual meeting of the National Conference of State Legislatures and perceiving that the NCSL was still "racially exclusive" at that time, decided to call for a national conference in Nashville, Tennessee. About ninety African American state legislators attended. The first president was Michigan state representative Matthew McNeely. The organization has grown to more than six hundred members by 2008. Legislators of this organization come from 44 states, the U.S. Virgin Islands, and the District of Columbia.

Since its inception, NBCSL has met annually in a pre-determined host state for its Annual Legislative Conference. Throughout the year, NBCSL sponsors policy symposia to keep members abreast of growing policy trends and educated on policy issues that affect NBCSL’s constituents. When legislators attend the Annual Legislative Conference, policy committees meet and discuss policy resolutions, drawing upon information presented in the symposia, that are voted up or down by the membership. These resolutions become the policy position of the organization. Legislators, corporate partners, and labor representatives take these policy resolutions and use them to influence public policy in state legislatures and on Capitol Hill.

== Mission ==
The National Black Caucus of State Legislators (NBCSL) is a membership association representing more than 700 black state legislators from 47 states, the District of Columbia and the Virgin Islands. NBCSL members represent more than 50 million Americans of various racial backgrounds. NBCSL monitors federal and state activity and provides this information to its members through policy symposiums and conferences. Each year, NBCSL members pass policy resolutions that directly impact federal and state policy. The organization focuses on issues that directly impact US domestic policy and is committed to policies that positively affect all Americans.

The primary mission of the NBCSL is to develop, conduct, and promote educational, research, and training programs designed to enhance the effectiveness of its members, as they consider legislation and issues of public policy which impact, either directly or indirectly, upon the general welfare of African American constituents within their respective jurisdictions.

== Executive officers ==
- Representative Harold M. Love Jr. (D–TN), President
- Senator Raumesh Akbari (D–TN), President-Elect
- Senator James Sanders Jr. (D–NY), Vice President
- Representative Toni Rose (D–TX), Secretary
- Delegate Ashanti Martinez (D–MD), Financial Secretary
- Representative Cherrish Pryor (D–IN), Treasurer
- Senator Gerald Neal (D–KY), Parliamentarian
- Senator Paul Lowe (D–NC), Chaplain

== State legislative black caucuses ==
- Alabama Legislative House & Senate Black Caucus

Chairperson: Representative Laura Hall

- Arizona Legislative Black Caucus

Chairperson: Representative Leah Landrum Taylor

- Arkansas Legislative Black Caucus

Chairperson: Representative Kevin Goss

- California Legislative Black Caucus

Chairperson: Holly Mitchell

- Delaware Black Caucus

Chairperson: Margaret Rose Henry

- Florida Conference of Black Legislators

Chairperson: Alan B. Williams

- Georgia Legislative Black Caucus

Chairperson: Senator Lester G. Jackson

- Illinois Legislative Black Caucus

Chairperson: Representative Kenneth Dunkin

- Indiana Black Legislative Caucus

Chairperson: Vernon G. Smith

- Iowa Black Caucus

Chairperson: Representative Wayne Ford

- Kansas African American Legislative Caucus

Chairperson: Representative Barbara W. Ballard

- Kentucky Black Legislative Caucus

Chairperson: Senator Gerald A. Neal

- Legislative Black Caucus of Maryland

Chairperson: Delegate Daryl Barnes

- Missouri Legislative Black Caucus

Chairperson: Representative John Bowman

- Legislative Black Caucus (Virgin Islands)

Chairperson: Senator Usie Richards

- Legislative Black and Hispanic Caucus (Wisconsin)

Chairperson: Senator Lena Taylor

- Legislative Black and Puerto Rican Caucus (Connecticut)

Chairperson: Representative Christopher Rosario

- Louisiana Legislative Black Caucus

Chairperson: Representative Juan A. LaFonta

- Massachusetts Black Legislative Caucus

Chairperson: Representative Willie-Mae Allen

- Michigan Legislative Black Caucus

Chairperson: Mayor Sheldon Neeley

- Mississippi Legislative Black Caucus

Chairperson: Senator Kenneth Wayne Jones

- Nevada Black Legislative Caucus
- New Jersey Legislative Black Caucus

Chairperson: Senator Ronald L. Rice

- New York Legislative Black Caucus

Chairperson: Assemblyman N. Nick Perry

- North Carolina Legislative Black Caucus

Chairperson: Representative Beverly Earle

- Ohio Legislative Black Caucus

Chairperson: Representative Barbara A. Sykes

- Oklahoma Legislative Black Caucus

Chairperson: Representative Anastasia A. Pittman

- Pennsylvania Legislative Black Caucus

Chairperson: Representative Stephen Kinsey

- Rhode Island Minority Legislator/Leadership Caucus

Chairperson: Representative Joseph S. Almeida

- South Carolina Legislative Black Caucus

Chairperson: Representative Ivory Thigpen

- Tennessee Legislative Black Caucus

Chairperson: Representative Johnny Shaw

- Texas Legislative Black Caucus

Chairperson: Representative Senfronia Thompson

- Virginia Legislative Black Caucus

Chairperson: Delegate Dwight Jones
