= Ruby Gilbert =

American politician

- Ruby Gilbert in 1993

Member of the Kansas House of Representatives from the 89th district
- In office 1991 – January 10, 2005
- Preceded by: Theo Cribbs
- Succeeded by: Melody McCray-Miller

Personal details
- Born: December 19, 1929 Dallas, Texas, U.S.
- Died: February 28, 2010 (aged 80)
- Party: Democratic
- Spouse: Booker

Ruby Gilbert (December 19, 1929 – February 28, 2010) was an American politician.

Gilbert was born in Childress, Texas and was raised in Dallas, Texas. In 1954, Gilbert moved to Wichita, Kansas and worked as a nurse's aide at Wesley Hospital in Wichita. Gilbert served in the Kansas House of Representatives from 1991 to 2004, from Wichita, and was the first African-American woman to be elected to the Kansas Legislature. Gilbert was appointed to the Kansas House of Representatives in 1991 to fill a vacancy and then was elected to the house in 1992. She was a Democrat. Gilbert died from cancer.
