= John Davis (Kansas politician) =

American politician

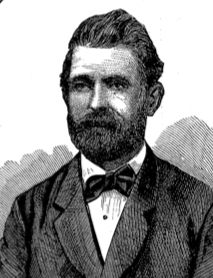

Member of the U.S. House of Representatives from Kansas's 5th congressional district
- In office March 4, 1891 – March 3, 1895
- Preceded by: John Alexander Anderson
- Succeeded by: William A. Calderhead

Personal details
- Born: August 9, 1826 Springfield, Illinois
- Died: August 1, 1901 (aged 74) Topeka, Kansas
- Resting place: Topeka Cemetery
- Party: Populist Party
- Other political affiliations: Greenback Party
- Education: Illinois College

John Davis (August 9, 1826 – August 1, 1901) was a U.S. representative from Kansas.

== Early life ==
Born near Springfield, Illinois, Davis moved with his parents to Macon County in 1830. He attended the country schools, Springfield Academy, and Illinois College, Jacksonville, Illinois. He engaged in agricultural and horticultural pursuits near Decatur, Illinois.

== Career ==
Davis moved to Kansas in 1872 and located on a farm near Junction City. He was elected president of the first distinctive farmers' convention held in Kansas in 1873, out of which grew the Farmers' Cooperative Association, of which he was the first president.

He later served as president of the Grange convention in 1874 and became proprietor and editor of the Junction City Tribune in 1875. Davis also served as Secretary of the Central Kansas Horticultural Society for many years.

=== Politics ===
Davis was an anti-slave Republican and believed in the principle of government supported agricultural education. He was also "a neighbor and intimate acquaintance of Abraham Lincoln".

Davis was an unsuccessful candidate of the Greenback Party for election in 1880 to the Forty-seventh Congress and in 1882 to the Forty-eighth Congress.

Davis was elected as a Populist to the Fifty-second and Fifty-third Congresses (March 4, 1891 – March 3, 1895). In congress, he made speeches on finance, tariff reform, transportation, the income tax, and was an advocate of women's suffrage.

Davis was unsuccessful in his bid for re-election in 1894 to the Fifty-fourth Congress.

== Later life ==
After his political career Davis devoted his time to literary work until his death at the residence of his daughter in Topeka, Kansas, August 1, 1901. He was interred in Topeka Cemetery.

== Notes ==
U.S. House of Representatives
Preceded by John A. Anderson	Member of the U.S. House of Representatives from Kansas's 5th congressional district 1891 – 1895	Succeeded by William A. Calderhead
