= Kenneth King (Kansas politician) =

American politician

Member of the Kansas House of Representatives from the 77th district
- In office 1978–1996
- Preceded by: Bob Whittaker
- Succeeded by: Peggy Palmer

Personal details
- Born: May 21, 1930 Wichita, Kansas
- Died: January 20, 2003
- Party: Republican

Kenneth Ray King (May 21, 1930–January 20, 2003) was an American politician who served as a Republican member of the Kansas House of Representatives from 1978 to 1996. He represented the 77th District and lived in Leon, Kansas.

King was initially appointed to the House to fill the seat left vacant by the resignation of Bob Whittaker. He served for 18 years, and declined to run for re-election in 1996; he was succeeded by his former campaign manager Peggy Palmer, whom he endorsed.
