= Travel Air Type R Mystery Ship =

Early model of racing airplane

Mystery Ship
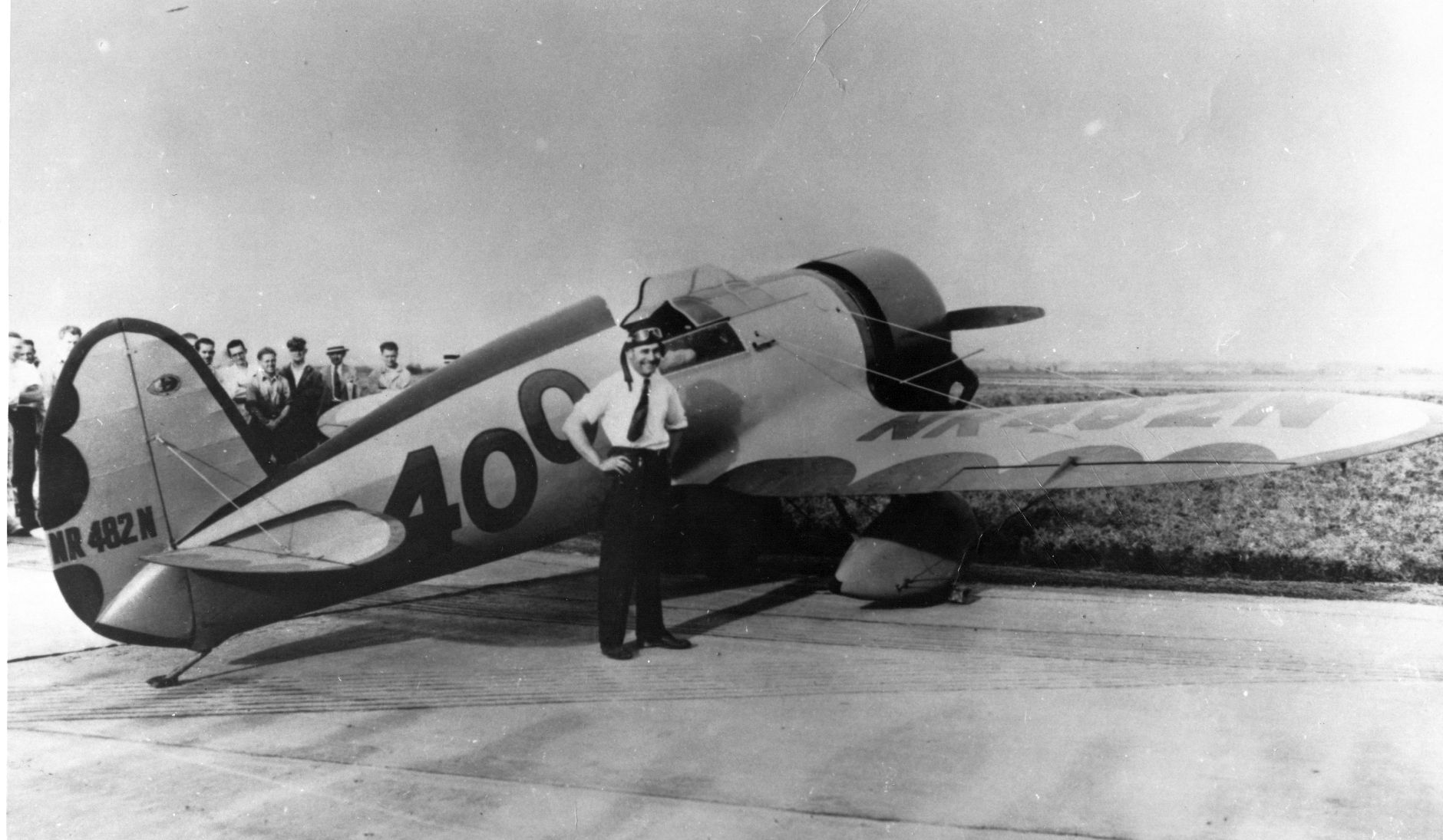
- Mystery Ship NR482N with Jimmy Doolittle

General information
- Type: Racing aircraft
- Manufacturer: Travel Air
- Designer: Herbert Rawdon
- Number built: 5

History
- First flight: August 29, 1929

The Type R "Mystery Ships" were a series of wire-braced, low-wing racing airplanes built by the Travel Air company in the late 1920s and early 1930s. They were so called because the first two aircraft of the series (R614K, R613K, together with Model B-11-D R612K) were built entirely in secrecy.

In total, five Type Rs were built and flown by some of the most notable flyers of the day, including Jimmy Doolittle, Doug Davis, Frank Hawks, and Pancho Barnes, not only in races but also at air shows across the United States, and most notably, by Hawks in Europe.

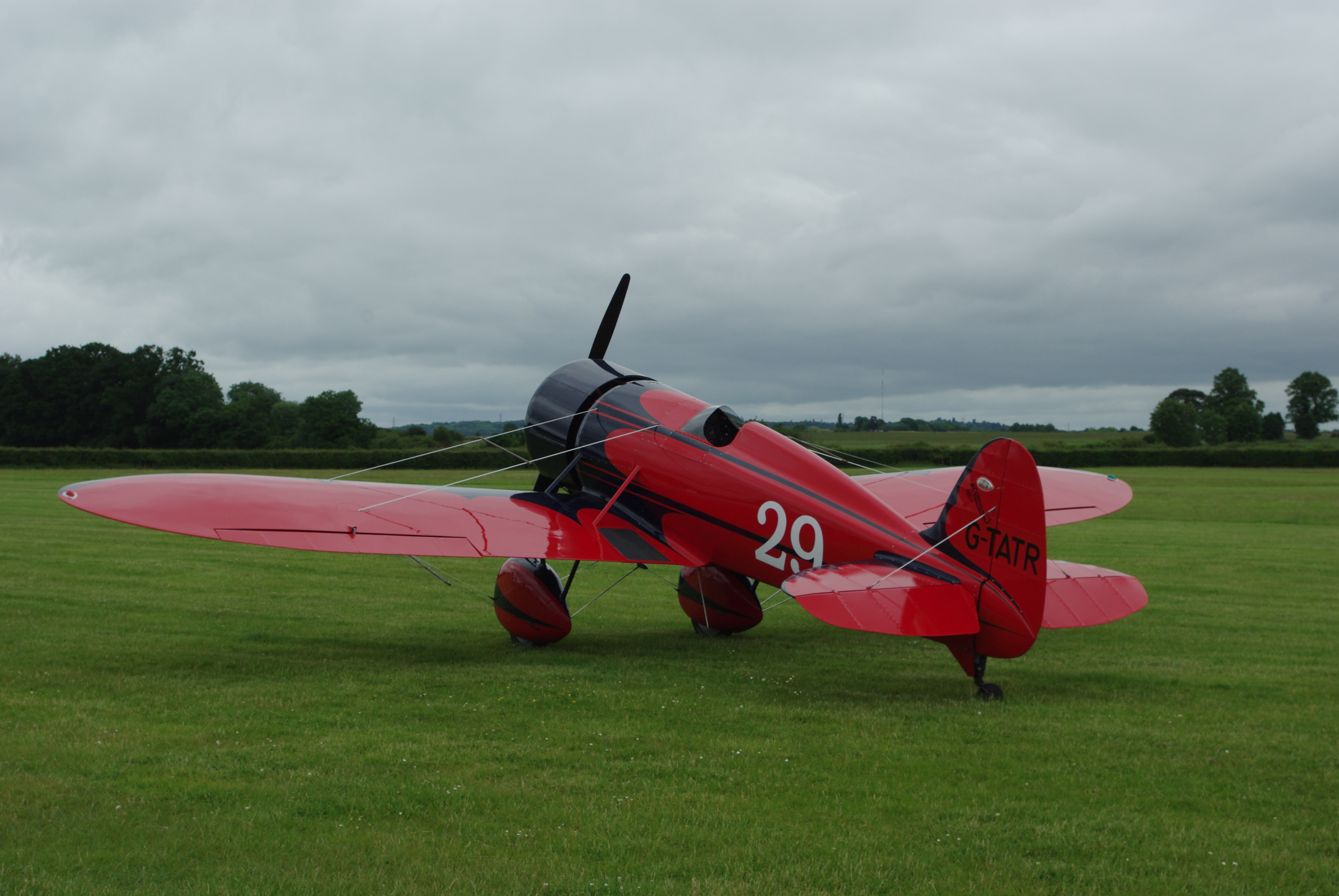
Replica G-TATR at Old Warden, June 2014

== Design and development ==
The environment in air racing at the time was one of give and take with the military. A civilian designer would take an existing aircraft design, modify it for greater speed and enter it in the race. Since the military already had access to the fastest and most advanced aircraft available, it was simply a matter of upping the horsepower on whatever aircraft they were using and the problem was solved. This led to the military completely dominating the air racing scene. In an effort to combat this, two Travel Air designers; Herb Rawdon and Walter Burnham undertook proving that a civilian aircraft built from scratch and designed exclusively for racing (as opposed to combat or passenger/mail service) could out-fly the military.

Under construction during 1928, the aircraft was kept under cover prior to the 1929 Cleveland Air Races, with the builders even going so far as painting the windows on the factory to keep the curious press from getting a look at it. The local Wichita paper picked up on the secret program, with one reporter even going so far as to scale a ladder to try to peek into the vents in the factory roof. The paper dubbed it the "Mystery Ship" and the name stuck with R (for Rawdon) added. Rawdon and Burnham both knew that to approach Travel Air CEO Walter Beech would be fruitless, unless they hit him with the idea just before the air racing season began, so they designed the aircraft in their spare time, without pay until they could get Beech to agree to build the type.

During an era when biplanes were still common, the use of a monoplane planform, a NACA engine cowl, and large wheel pants significantly reduced aerodynamic drag, creating a streamlined design. Construction of the fuselage and wings was based on a plywood structure with the thin wings braced with wires. The sleek, polished fuselage continued the shape and width of the cowl throughout, with the cockpit featuring a small windshield, set nearly flush with the skin. A turtle deck extended from the cockpit to the vertical tail creating a fairing for the helmeted head of the pilot.

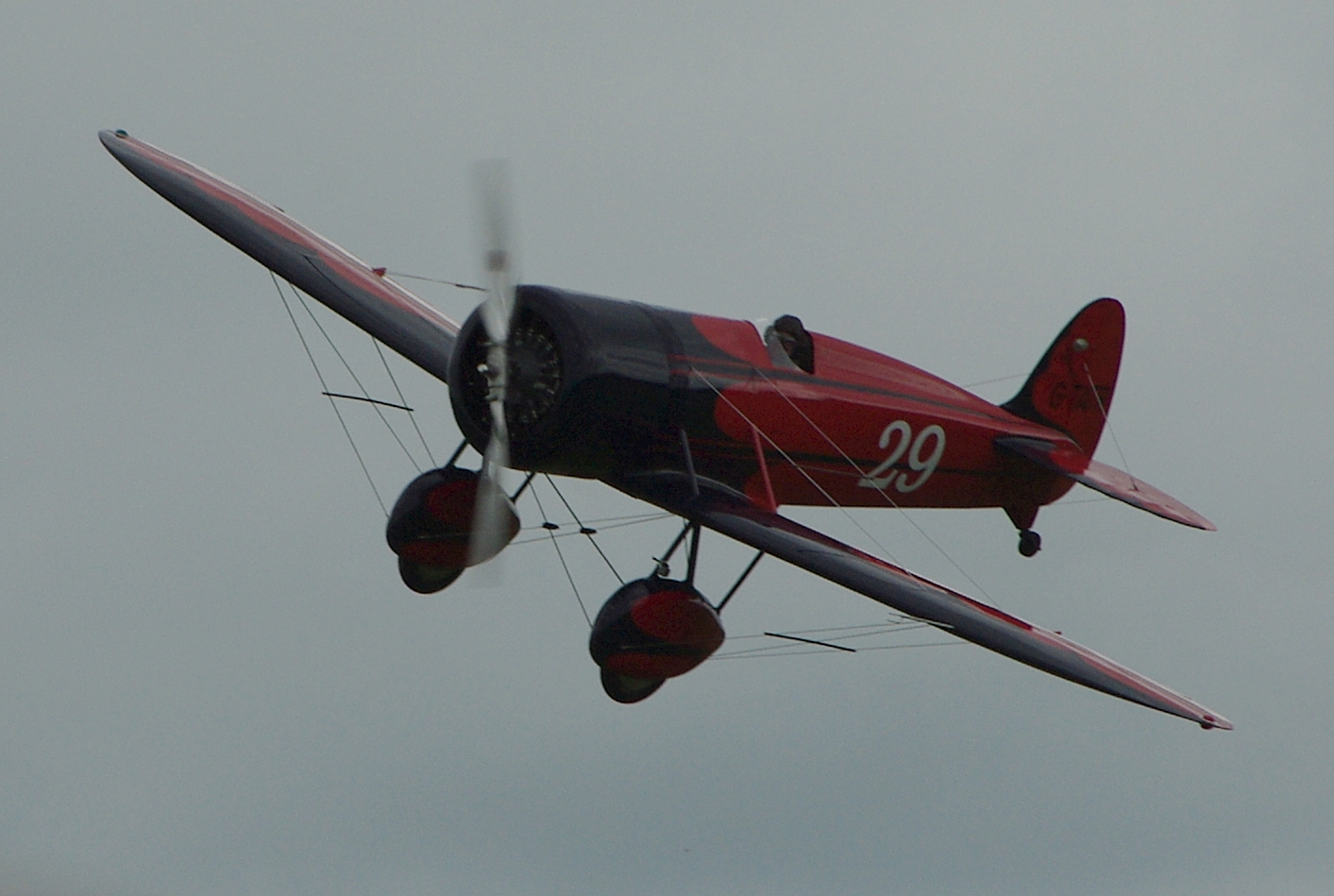
Replica G-TATR at Old Warden, June 2014

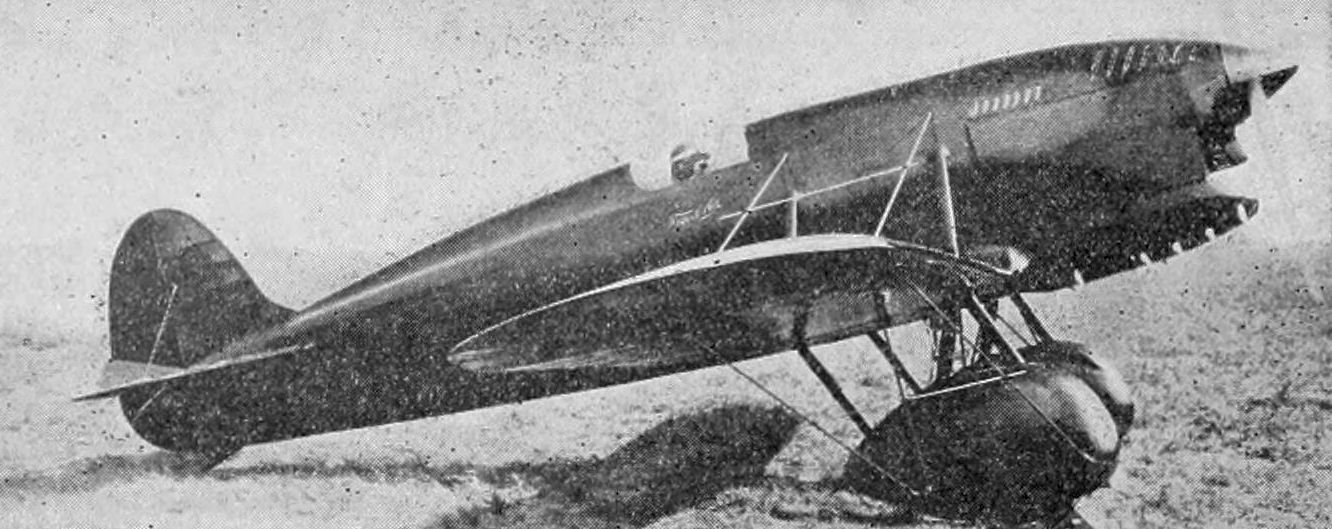
Travel Air R Mystery Ship with Chevrolair engine. Photo from Aero Digest, November 1929.

The first "Mystery Ship", NR614K (Race No. 31), was designed for both closed-course and long-distance racing. NR614K had two sets of wings, a shorter set of racing wings, about one and a half feet (0.46 m) shorter in span and three inches (7.6 cm) narrower in chord than the set used for cross-country events. R614K was destroyed when it caught fire before the 1931 Thompson Trophy race. The plane has since undergone a complete restoration and now resides at the Beechcraft Heritage Museum in Tullahoma, Tennessee.

Pancho Barnes's Travel Air Mystery Ship NR613K appearing in Sky Bride (1932)

The second Type R, NR613K (Race No. 32) was powered by a six-cylinder D-6 Chevrolair, manufactured by Arthur Chevrolet Aviation Motors Corporation of Indianapolis, Indiana. The six-cylinder air-cooled, inverted inline engine developed 165 hp at 2,175 rpm, and powered NR613K to a win in the Experimental class at the 1929 National Air Races. NR613K was later converted back to a radial-engined version by Florence "Pancho" Barnes. Paul Mantz later purchased the aircraft and used it extensively in film work. Years later, Barnes bought it back in an auction where other pilots made sure nobody bid against her. It is currently undergoing restoration in the UK.

The third Mystery Ship, NR482N (Race No. 35), was purchased by Shell for the use of Jimmy Hazlip and Jimmy Doolittle. NR614K's short wings were later purchased by Shell and were used, as required, on Doolittle's Race No. 400. NR482N also crashed and was a complete loss.

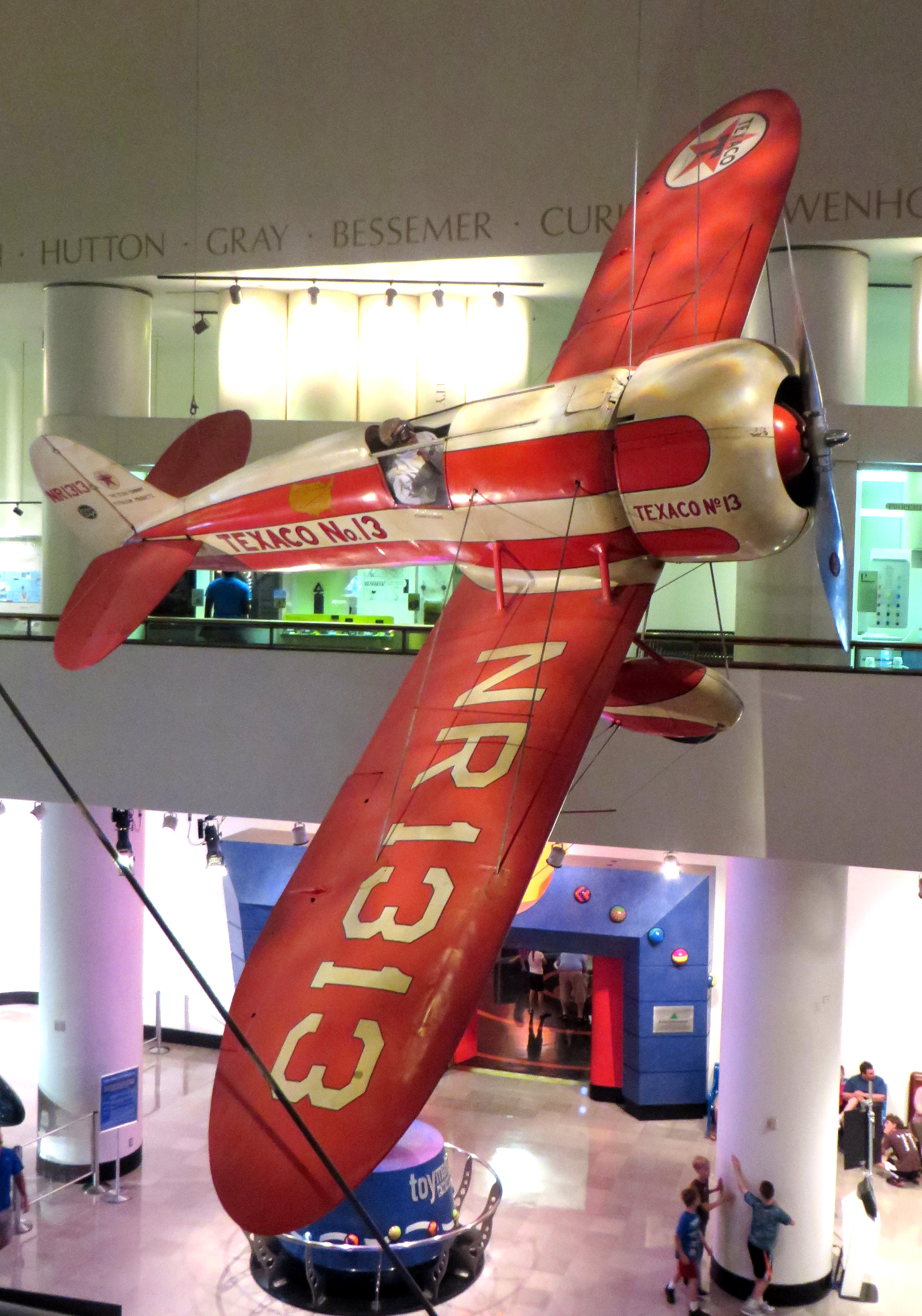
"Texaco 13" displayed at the Museum of Science and Industry in Chicago

The fourth Type R, NR1313, purchased by the Texaco Company for Frank Hawks as "Texaco 13" became the most famous of the series, setting numerous long-distance records both in the United States and internationally. "Texaco 13" is now displayed at the Museum of Science and Industry in Chicago, Illinois.

A fifth Type R, 11717/MM185, was built at the request of the Italian government several years after the rest, after Hawks toured the European continent. After factory construction and testing, it was subsequently disassembled, shipped by boat to Italy and served as the basis for the Breda Ba.27 fighter. It was later scrapped. The last Type R was built by Travel Air after it had been absorbed by Curtiss-Wright.

== Racing ==
The Model R series set numerous speed records for both pylon racing and cross-country flying, and were the most advanced aircraft of the day, by far outpacing anything that even the military could offer. On September 2, 1929, Doug Davis entered the "Mystery Ship" in the Thompson Cup Race. Davis won at a speed of 194.9 mph (one lap flown at 208.69 mph), beating the military entries, even recircling one of the pylons twice. Davis missed the second pylon of the course, circled back and while circling it again blacked out momentarily. Not knowing if he had missed the pylon again, Davis went around one more time, then continued on to win the race. This was the first time in the history of air racing that a civilian racer had outperformed a military aircraft.

== Specifications (NR614K) ==
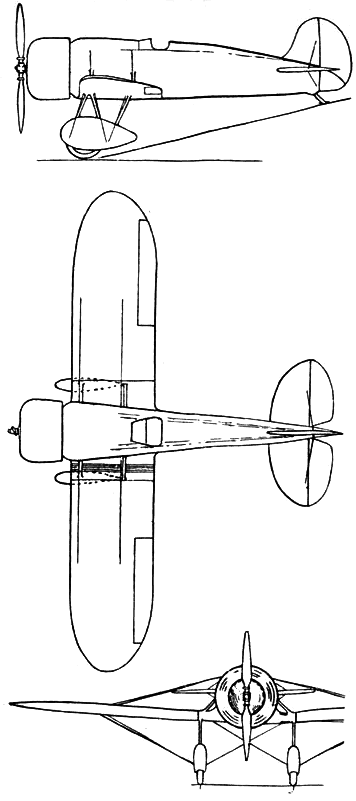
Travel Air Type R Mystery Ship 3-view drawing from l'Aerophile May 1931

Data from

General characteristics

- Crew: One pilot
- Length: 20 ft 2 in (6.15 m)
- Wingspan: 27 ft 8 in or 29 ft 2 in (8.43 or 8.89 m)
- Height: 7 ft 9 in (2.36 m)
- Empty weight: 1,475 lb (669.05 kg)
- Gross weight: 1,940 lb (879.97 kg)
- Powerplant: 1 × Wright J-6-9 , 300, 400 or 425 hp (224, 298 or 317 kW)

Performance

- Maximum speed: 235 mph (394.29 km/h, 204 kn)
