= Wichita Civil Rights Equal Employment Opportunity Commission =

The Wichita Civil Rights Equal Employment Opportunity Commission (CREEOC) - also known as the Wichita Civil Rights and Equal Employment Opportunity Commission or Wichita Civil Rights / EEO Commission - was an agency of the government of the City of Wichita, Kansas, active in the 1970s and 1980s, led by a volunteer board of civic leaders, appointed to oversee the operations of the Wichita Civil Rights / EEO Office, to investigate and review cases of alleged unlawful discrimination, monitor the implementation of the city's equal opportunity policies, and promote civil rights and equal employment opportunity for all populations in the City of Wichita.

== Origins ==
Under Ordinance No. 34-693, adopted by the Wichita Board of City Commissioners on October 26, 1976, CREEOC was assigned responsibility for the combined roles of its two predecessor organizations, from which CREEOC was formed in 1976. Those two prior organizations were:

- Wichita Commission on Civil Rights (WCCR) (often incorrectly referred to as the "Wichita Civil Rights Commission"), an agency formed in 1972, charged with enforcing Wichita's Civil Rights Ordinance, which forbade various forms of discrimination in government and public accommodations
- The Wichita Equal Employment Opportunity / Affirmative Action Board (EEO/AA Board), an agency oversight board, formed in 1974, charged with enforcing the City's EEO and Affirmative Action performance requirements for recipients of City money and aid, such as vendors, employment agencies and recipients of subsidies and concessions

The staff of the new agency, initially referred to as the "Civil Rights and Equal Opportunity Office," were partially funded through federal CETA funds, and drawn from the City's Human Rights Division—an office that had previously provided staff support to the WCCR and had worked on police-community relations (PCR) issues. The rest of the Human Rights Division was reassigned to serve the City Manager, directly, on PCR issues.

== Functions ==
The official goals of CREEOC were to "eliminate and prevent discrimination, segregation and separation in all places of public accommodations, housing and employment because of race, religion, color, sex, physical handicap, national origin or ancestry, and marital status as authorized by the City Code."

To attain that goal, the CREEOC performed two complementary functions:

- The Civil Rights function involved the intake, investigation and analysis of discrimination complaints—as well as conferences, conciliations, or public hearings upon findings of probable cause.
- The EEO function involved reviewing and monitoring the businesses and organizations having contracts or agreements with the City of Wichita, to determine if their employment practices were non-discriminatory, and were applied equally to all applicants and employees.

The responsibility of this organization was to carry out the city's adopted policies directed at civil rights and equal employment opportunity. This office assisted in the drafting and filing of civil rights complaints related to employment, housing and public accommodations.

The responsibility of the program in 1979 included the review of all Equal Employment Opportunity (EEO) programs submitted by vendors of the City, or by agencies in contract with the City. In addition to the review of EEO programs submitted to the city by its contractors and vendors, this office was responsible for monitoring those adopted EEO programs to determine and track their compliance with City requirements.

By 1983, CREEOC had also been assigned responsibility for providing staff support to two other city advisory boards: the Commission on the Status of Women and the Commission on the Status of Handicapped People. Part of the Executive Director's salary was accordingly paid from federal funds for that purpose.

== Organization and authority ==
The CREEOC office and its staff included a paid Executive Director (originally Jesse Rice, later Annie Montgomery), overseeing 9 to 11 staffers (later reduced to 5), including investigators, compliance specialists and administrative personnel.

A 10-member volunteer commission (multi-racial and dual-gender) oversaw the CREEOC office and its staff. George Boyd served as its first chairperson, followed by Kathy Pearce.

The CREEOC commissioners were assigned to review civil rights complaint cases, following investigation by staff, and—on rotating assignments—commissioners had individual authority to rule on probable cause in the individual civil rights cases assigned to them, with authority to refer such cases to the City Attorney (or District Attorney in the case of offenses by the City government) for prosecution.

Wichita was the first city in Kansas to adopt the Kansas Act Against Discrimination by reference (incorporate it into local law). This act provided enforcement authority for the local civil rights commission in the areas of employment, public accommodations, and housing. CREEOC—according to a July, 1980 review by the Kansas Advisory Committee to the United States Commission on Civil Rights—had "identical investigative and remedial authority to that of the State commission" (KCCR).

== Controversy ==
Though developed to address community civil rights and minority issues during a period of exceptional racial tensions and community conflict, CREEOC was largely preoccupied with its own internal battles, and battles with other offices of city government, and played an unexpectedly minor role in the community issues it was designed to address.

=== Community troubles ===
During the late 1970s, a period of major troubles in police-community relations (including riots with police) - and troubles in both external and internal race relations in local law enforcement agencies (particularly the Wichita Police Department and Sedgwick County Sheriff's Office) - CREEOC generally stayed on the sidelines.

CREEOC chose not to investigate the "systemic discrimination" allegations made by 18 minority police officers against the Wichita Police Department, and observed a policy of not investigating cases involving the physical use of force—saying it had no authority in that area—leaving that to other local, state and federal agencies pursuing those issues.

=== Internal troubles ===
In 1978, CREEOC attempted to extract its administrative office from the normal city hiring/firing protocol, by asking the City Commission to authorize CREEOC to hire and fire its own Executive Director. The May 31 CREEOC meeting, to consider making that request, aroused concern when the staff failed to provide the legally required advance public notice of the meeting, in violation of the Kansas Open Meetings Act - the second time in two months that such a violation had occurred.

CREEOC's chief staffer, its black Executive Director Jesse Rice, sued the City of Wichita, its City Manager Gene Denton, and its Police Chief Richard LaMunyon, alleging racial discrimination in pay, and alleging retaliation for Rice's aid to another city employee who had filed a discrimination complaint.

The trial became complicated by interconnection with a police lieutenant, fired from the Wichita Police Department, who was also pursuing a wrongful-termination / civil rights lawsuit against the city (later won in Federal District Court). The officer later testified to alleged spying on CREEOC Director Rice by city police on the orders of the City Manager and Police Chief (charges denied).

On February 7, 1979, during a CREEOC board meeting, Rice engaged in heated arguments with two of the commissioners over his office's reports, telling Commissioner Richard Harris to "shut up," then refused to answer questions from those two. Another commissioner alleged that Harris and a fellow commissioner were "racists."

When commissioners discussed a process for their annual evaluation of Executive Director Rice, Harris pulled out a copy of Rice's prior evaluation form, which had been acquired by another commissioner (allegedly from the public records of the city clerk's office). When Harris attempted to point out a part of it to fellow board members, Rice grabbed it from him in a brief struggle. Though Harris and other board members demanded Rice return the document, he refused, threatened immediate legal "retaliation" against Harris and possibly other board members, and "stormed" out of the meeting, taking a tape recorder and tapes of the meeting (both owned by the City) and dismissing the secretary who was taking the minutes of the meeting.

On February 9, 1979, Rice was fired by Wichita City Manager Denton, for "flagrant insubordination" for his alleged conduct at the February 7 CREEOC board meeting, and for withholding the tapes of the meeting. Three of the four black members of the CREEOC board resigned in protest of Rice's firing. The local NAACP president and some other community activists denounced the firing. Rice himself responded by adding his firing to the lawsuit charges, filed in federal court.

After two years' litigation, the suit was defeated, and Rice's attorney, Fred Phelps, Sr., was disbarred by the state courts, and censured by the federal courts (largely for conduct related to the Rice case).

== Reorganization and restriction ==
Following the controversy with Rice, the Wichita Board of City Commissioners voted to reduce the CREEOC budget, and ultimately to reorganize the office, and—by 1984—combine it with the Community Grievance Office, to form the Wichita Citizens Rights and Services Division (CRS), and converted the CREEOC board into the Wichita Citizens Rights and Services Board—a purely advisory entity—withdrawing the commissioners' authority to rule on probable cause in civil rights cases, changing the agency's role from "enforcement" to "conciliation." CREEOC's new Executive Director, Annie Montgomery, was retained as the CRS Executive Director.

== See also ==
- Kansas Commission on Civil Rights (KCCR), which served a similar role for all of Kansas. CREEOC was largely patterned on KCCR, and KCCR worked with CREEOC on various matters, and the two organizations referred cases to each other, depending upon jurisdictional issues.
