= Bob Whittaker =

American politician

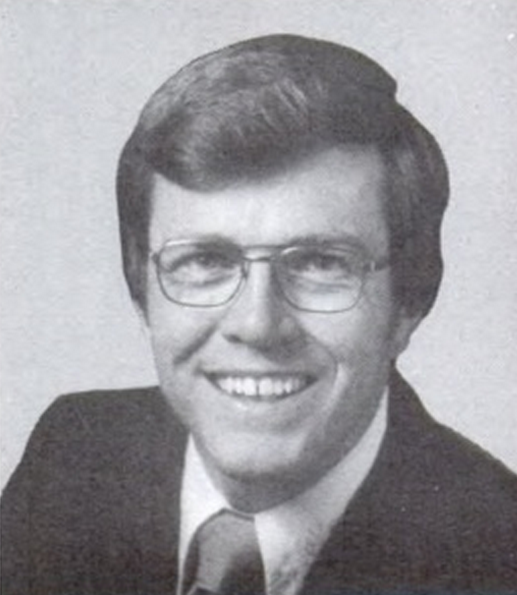

Member of the U.S. House of Representatives from Kansas's 5th district
- In office January 3, 1979 – January 3, 1991
- Preceded by: Joe Skubitz
- Succeeded by: Dick Nichols

Member of the Kansas House of Representatives from the 77th district
- In office January 1975 – January 1977
- Preceded by: Newt Male
- Succeeded by: Kenneth King

Personal details
- Born: Robert Russell Whittaker; September 18, 1939 (age 86) Eureka, Kansas, U.S.
- Party: Republican
- Education: University of Kansas; Emporia State University; Illinois College of Optometry (OD)

Robert Russell Whittaker (born September 18, 1939) is an American medical professional and former six-term U.S. representative from Kansas, serving from 1979 to 1991.

== Early life ==
Whittaker was born in Eureka, Kansas, and was educated in the Greenwood County public schools. He attended the University of Kansas from 1957 to 1959, and Emporia State University during the summer of 1959. Whittaker earned his Doctor of Optometry degree (O.D.) from Illinois College of Optometry in 1962, and began practice as an optometrist. He was clinic director for the Kansas Low Vision Clinic in 1973.

== Political career ==
Whittaker's first foray into politics was as precinct committeeman and member of the city planning commission from 1970 to 1974. He served in the Kansas House of Representatives from 1974 to 1977.

=== Congress ===
Whittaker was elected as a Republican to the Ninety-sixth and to the five succeeding Congresses (January 3, 1979 – January 3, 1991). He was not a candidate for renomination in 1990 to the One Hundred Second Congress.

== Later career ==
After leaving Congress, he was hired as a senior legislative analyst at the Washington, D.C.-based lobbying and public relations firm Fleishman-Hillard.

He is a resident of Colorado Springs, Colorado.

U.S. House of Representatives
Preceded by Joe Skubitz	Member of the U.S. House of Representatives from Kansas's 5th congressional district 1979–1991	Succeeded by Dick Nichols
U.S. order of precedence (ceremonial)
Preceded by David Wu as Former U.S. Representative	Order of precedence of the United States as Former U.S. Representative	Succeeded by Jim Slattery as Former U.S. Representative
