= Melody McCray-Miller =

American politician (1956–2026)

Member of the Kansas House of Representatives from the 89th district
- In office January 10, 2005 – January 14, 2013
- Preceded by: Ruby Gilbert
- Succeeded by: Roderick Houston

Personal details
- Born: November 18, 1956
- Died: February 21, 2026 (aged 69)
- Party: Democratic
- Children: 3
- Parent: Billy McCray (father)
- Education: University of Houston; Wichita State University

Melody McCray-Miller (November 18, 1956 – February 21, 2026) was an American politician from the state of Kansas. A Democrat, McCray-Miller represented the 89th district in the Kansas House of Representatives from 2005 through 2013.

== Early life and education ==
McCray-Miller received her BA in Psychology from the University of Houston and a secondary school teaching certificate from Wichita State University. Her father was Billy McCray, a longtime state legislator who died in 2012.

== Political career ==
Prior to her election to the House, McCray-Miller served as a Wichita city commissioner and on the local school board. She served on the Executive Board of the Center for Health and Wellness, the Advisory Board for Wichita Children's Home, and the Grant Chapel A.M.E. Steward Board.

In 2023, she filed to run for the at-large seat on the District 259 school board in Wichita. She advanced from the five-candidate primary on August 1, 2023, with 54% of the vote, more than 30 points ahead of second-place finisher Brent T. Davis, who will join the November runoff for the seat.

== Death ==
McCray-Miller died in February 2026, at the age of 69.
