= Herbert Rawdon =

American aviation pioneer

- Born: December 30, 1904
- Died: December 2, 1975 (aged 70); Wichita, Kansas, U.S.
- Education: Tri-State College
- Known for: Aviation pioneer, aircraft designer, engineer
- Notable work: Travel Air Type R Mystery Ship

Herbert Rawdon (30 December 1904 – 2 December 1975 in Wichita, Kansas) was an American aviation pioneer.

== Aviation career ==
Rawdon graduated from Tri-State College in Angola, Indiana in 1925 with a BS degree in mechanical engineering, and began working at the Wichita-based Travel Air Manufacturing Company, soon rising to chief engineer. Every spring, company boss Walter Beech would come into the engineering department and suggest that they convert a stock design into a faster or more powerful airplane to be entered in that year's racing events. In 1927 Rawdon was on the team of engineers that modified a pair of Travel Air 5000 aircraft which won the deadly Dole Air Race to Hawaii. After the 1928 National Air Races, Rawdon told himself, "All things being equal, I'd just as soon not go through this exercise next year." He and his assistant Walter E. Burnham began working on their own at that point to design the Travel Air Type R Mystery Ship, which Beech accepted and built, just in time to enter the 1929 race. The plane ended up winning the race ahead of the fastest military biplanes of the day (the first time that a military airplane had lost that race). The streamlining and low-wing design of this airplane influenced aircraft design for the next decade.

The Great Depression eventually forced Travel Air into bankruptcy, when airplane sales dropped dramatically. The company was bought by Curtiss-Wright, at which time Rawdon left.

In 1933 Rawdon obtained employment as draftsman, first at Lockheed, then at Boeing. He became an engineering instructor at the C-W Technical Institute in 1935, also serving as production manager for Spartan Aircraft Company during that time. From 1937 to 1940 he worked as a design engineer for Douglas Aircraft Company and also consulted for National Aircraft Company (San Antonio, Texas).

In 1940 Rawdon resumed his working relationship with Walter Beech, working as chief engineer for Beechcraft until 1960.

After retiring from Beechcraft, Rawdon performed consulting work for Lockheed, Cessna and Lycoming Engines. He maintained a design station in the Cessna Engineering Department through the 1970s. He also maintained a consulting and fabrication company which provided aircraft modifications. One notable example was the installation of flat engines on the formerly-radially-equipped Beech 18.

After Rawdon's death in December 1975 his family donated his collection of papers, books, calculations and photographs to the Wichita State University libraries in 1981. The collection takes up 15 feet of shelf space.

== Rawdon Brothers Aircraft ==
Herb and brothers Gene and Alanson ("Dutch") formed an aircraft design company. Their first effort was aimed at winning a contract to provide training aircraft for the Civil Pilot Training Program. By 1938 they had completed the R-1, a low-wing two-place monoplane of conventional design with a 75 hp (56 kW) engine. Since their chance of winning the government competition appeared slim, they converted the prototype into a cropduster, and built another five units in that configuration as local applicators learned of the product and sought them out.

In 1943 RBA sold the R-1 prototype and began work on the T-1, an improved version of the R-1. Work was deferred by World War II, and the design did not receive certification until September 1947. Several units were sold.

The company also sold their Rawdon Hatch, an enclosed canopy which could be added to open-cockpit aircraft such as the Fairchild PT-19 and Fairchild PT-23 and Stearman PT-13/17s.

When the Korean War broke out in 1950, Rawdon Brothers Aircraft received several government contracts to supply wing panels, empennage members and pilot seats.

== Rawdon Airport ==
In the 1930s Rawdon and his brothers purchased open land adjacent to the Beechcraft factory. They constructed a workshop and laid out a grass airstrip. The strip was first private, but in 1940 the Rawdon Brothers Flying Service was organized, to provide flight instruction, airport services and commercial flights. The airport was first depicted on government aeronautical charts in 1941, as Rawdon Field.

By 1949 the airstrip boasted three intersecting grass runways (N-S, E-W and NW-SE), the longest the 2,550-foot diagonal strip. Gene Rawdon was listed as the airport manager.

In the 1950s the airport operation was taken over by a pioneering black aviator, U.L. "Rip" Gooch. He sold aircraft, provided flight instruction and aircraft maintenance). In the 1970s, Gooch became a Kansas state senator, retiring in 2003 at the age of 80.

The N-S strip was paved (2,550 feet) in the early 1960s. The other grass strips were abandoned at that point.

The airport was purchased from the Rawdons in 1973 by a local dentist named Copeland, and attempts were made to rename the strip Copeland Field. However, soon afterward Raytheon Aircraft Company (the current owners of Beechcraft) purchased the field. After that it was known as Beech North Field.
