= Mabel Cody =

American pioneering stunt pilot

Mabel Cody (August 15, 1886 – unknown) was a pioneering stunt pilot and founder of the Mabel Cody Flying Circus. She was the niece of Buffalo Bill Cody.

== Career ==
Pilot for the Mabel Cody Flying Circus holds steady as Bugs McGowan transfers from the car to the plane.

Cody worked with a troupe of stunt people to perform at fairs and special events. Her circus primarily performed in Coral Gables, Florida, with support from notable promoters like George E. Merrick. Performances included stunts such as night-flying, wing walking, auto-to-airplane transfers, single- and double-parachute drops, and acrobatic loop-to-loops.

In 1921, Cody sought to become the first woman to transfer from a moving car onto the wing of a flying plane. Her announcement of this plan drew criticism, with many women calling in to dissuade her from trying this stunt. During her first attempt, inclement weather prevented her from performing the stunt. Three years later, on March 23, 1924, Cody organized another attempt in Pablo Beach, Florida. In a car traveling at 65 mph, Cody successfully initiated the transfer onto the airplane. As Cody grabbed the ladder hanging off the airplane wing, the rung broke. Cody fell 50 feet, and was promptly sent to a nearby hospital.

Despite this injury, Cody quickly returned to the aviation stunt circus scene. In 1924 she performed at Vilano Beach, Florida. In late 1924, Cody merged the Mabel Cody Flying Circus with that of rival Doug Davis. Reports state that Cody and Davis shook hands to confirm this merger after landing a plane on the flatcar of a moving freight train.

In 1927, Cody continued pushing the boundaries of her stunts by climbing onto a plane from a speedboat. She was the first woman to perform this stunt.
