= Rollin R. Rees =

American politician

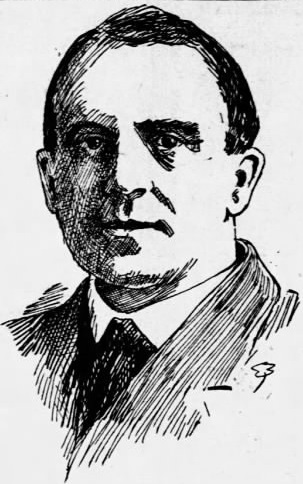
- Salina Semi-Weekly Journal (Salina, Kansas), October 14, 1910

Member of the U.S. House of Representatives from Kansas's 5th district
- In office March 4, 1911 – March 3, 1913
- Preceded by: William A. Calderhead
- Succeeded by: Guy T. Helvering

Member of the Kansas House of Representatives
- In office 1899-1903

Personal details
- Born: January 10, 1865 Camden, Ohio
- Died: May 30, 1935 (aged 70) Anaheim, California
- Party: Republican

Rollin Raymond Rees (January 10, 1865 – May 30, 1935) was a U.S. representative from Kansas.

Born in Camden, Ohio, Rees moved with his parents to Ottawa County, Kansas, in 1867. He attended the public schools and graduated from the agricultural college at Manhattan, Kansas, in 1885. He studied law and was admitted to the bar in 1887 and commenced practice in Minneapolis, Kansas. He served as the prosecuting attorney of Ottawa County 1895–1899, as a member of the State house of representatives 1899–1903, and as judge of the thirtieth judicial district 1903–1910. He resigned to become a candidate for Congress.

Rees was elected as a Republican to the Sixty-second Congress (March 4, 1911 – March 3, 1913). He was an unsuccessful candidate for reelection in 1912 to the Sixty-third Congress, and afterwards resumed the practice of law in Minneapolis, Kansas. He moved to California and engaged in banking and ranching.

Rees died in Anaheim, California on May 30, 1935, and was interred in Fairhaven Cemetery, Orange, California.

U.S. House of Representatives
Preceded by William A. Calderhead	Member of the U.S. House of Representatives from Kansas's 5th congressional district 1911 – 1913	Succeeded by Guy T. Helvering
