= Doug Davis (aviator) =

American aviator

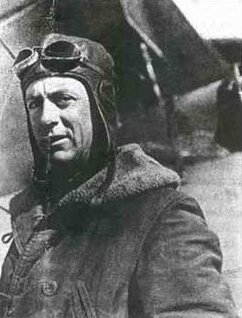
Douglas Henry Davis

Douglas Henry Davis (November 12, 1898 – September 3, 1934) was an early American aviator, barnstormer, air racer, flight instructor and commercial pilot.

== Early life ==
Davis was born in Zebulon, Georgia, the son of Jonathan A. and Etta (née Ogletree) Davis. He was raised on a farm and attended Griffin High School.

== World War I ==
When the United States entered World War I in 1917, Davis left school in his senior year without obtaining his diploma and enlisted in the United States Army Air Service. He graduated at the top of his class and was commissioned a second lieutenant. To his disappointment, Davis was made an instructor, flying a Curtiss JN-4D "Jenny" trainer rather than fighting the enemy in the skies over France. A superior informed him, "There’s a shortage of capable instructors and you’re needed here to teach others to fly." He trained under and was a friend of the Wright brothers.

== Barnstorming and other business activities ==
After his discharge in 1919, Davis purchased a surplus government Jenny, which he named "Glenna Mae" after his future wife, and turned to barnstorming in the southeastern United States. Eventually he sold the Jenny and bought three Wacos. He sold and repaired airplanes, acquiring a Waco dealership, before switching to Travel Air.

He formed the Doug Davis Flying Circus, and through the early 1920s, his barnstorming outfit competed fiercely with the rival Mabel Cody Flying Circus. Eventually the two merged and formed the Baby Ruth Flying Circus in 1924, sponsored by Otto Schnering. Schnering was the founder of the Curtiss Candy Company, which manufactured the Baby Ruth candy bar. Davis had previously worked for Schnering, promoting his product by dropping the candy bars, attached to paper parachutes, from his airplane. In 1923, he created a national uproar by flying low between buildings in the business district of Pittsburgh distributing candy. On the Fourth of July weekend in 1926, he did the same promotion over Coney Island. In Miami in 1927, a candy distributor got Davis to let his 12-year-old son, Paul Tibbets, drop the candy bars from Davis's Waco 9 to the crowd at the Hialeah Park Race Track. It made a big impression on the boy; he later said, "From that day on, I knew I had to fly." Tibbets would go on to pilot the Boeing B-29 Superfortress that dropped the first atomic bomb on Hiroshima, Japan, in World War II.

In 1926 or 1927, Davis constructed the first permanent aircraft hangar at Candler Field, a converted auto speedway near Atlanta, which eventually became Atlanta Municipal Airfield in 1946. (The Doug Davis hangar was recreated in early 2015 at the Candler Field Museum.) He set up an aviation school there, the Douglas Davis Flying Service. He also ran a charter service between Atlanta and Birmingham, Alabama, before selling it to Texas Air Transport in 1929. Both the school and the charter service were firsts for Atlanta. In 1930, he joined Eastern Air Transport (the predecessor of Eastern Air Lines) and piloted the first commercial airline flight from Atlanta to New York City the same year.

== Air racing and death ==
Davis was also an accomplished air racer. In the 1928 Atlanta Air Races, he won or placed second in every race. In 1929, Travel Air got him to race its new airplane, the Travel Air Type R, dubbed the "Mystery Ship" by the press because its development had been kept a closely guarded secret. On September 2, 1929, he flew it to a win in event 26, a free-for-all speed contest – five laps of a triangular 10-mile (16 km) course – at the National Air Races in Cleveland at a speed of 194.90 miles per hour (313.66 km/h). His civilian airplane was the first to defeat military aircraft. In 1934, he won the Bendix Trophy, flying a Wedell-Williams Model 44 from Burbank to Cleveland (to compete in the National Air Races) at a speed of 216.24 miles per hour (348.00 km/h) in nine hours, 26 minutes and 43 seconds. Movie star Mary Pickford presented him with the trophy, while Vincent Bendix gave him his $5400 prize check.

At the National Air Races, he complained that the course for the last and biggest competition, the Thompson Trophy Race, held on Labor Day (September 3 that year), was too short – eight and a third miles (13.4 km) rather than the more customary ten miles (16 km) to make the race easier for the audience to follow – and that "Someone may get killed this afternoon." This proved to be prophetic. Davis was leading on the eighth lap, but missed a pylon. He banked to turn around and try to pass the pylon properly, only to stall and crash into the ground, dying instantly out of sight of the 60,000 spectators. He was 35 years old. The announcer lied and told the crowd he had bailed out.

== Personal life ==
Davis married Glenna Mae D'Hollosay on December 25, 1925.

His son, Doug Davis Jr., was six at the time of his father's death. He would become a successful painter before dying in an Air France Boeing 707 crash on takeoff from Orly Field, Paris, on June 3, 1962, at about the same age as his father.

== Honors ==
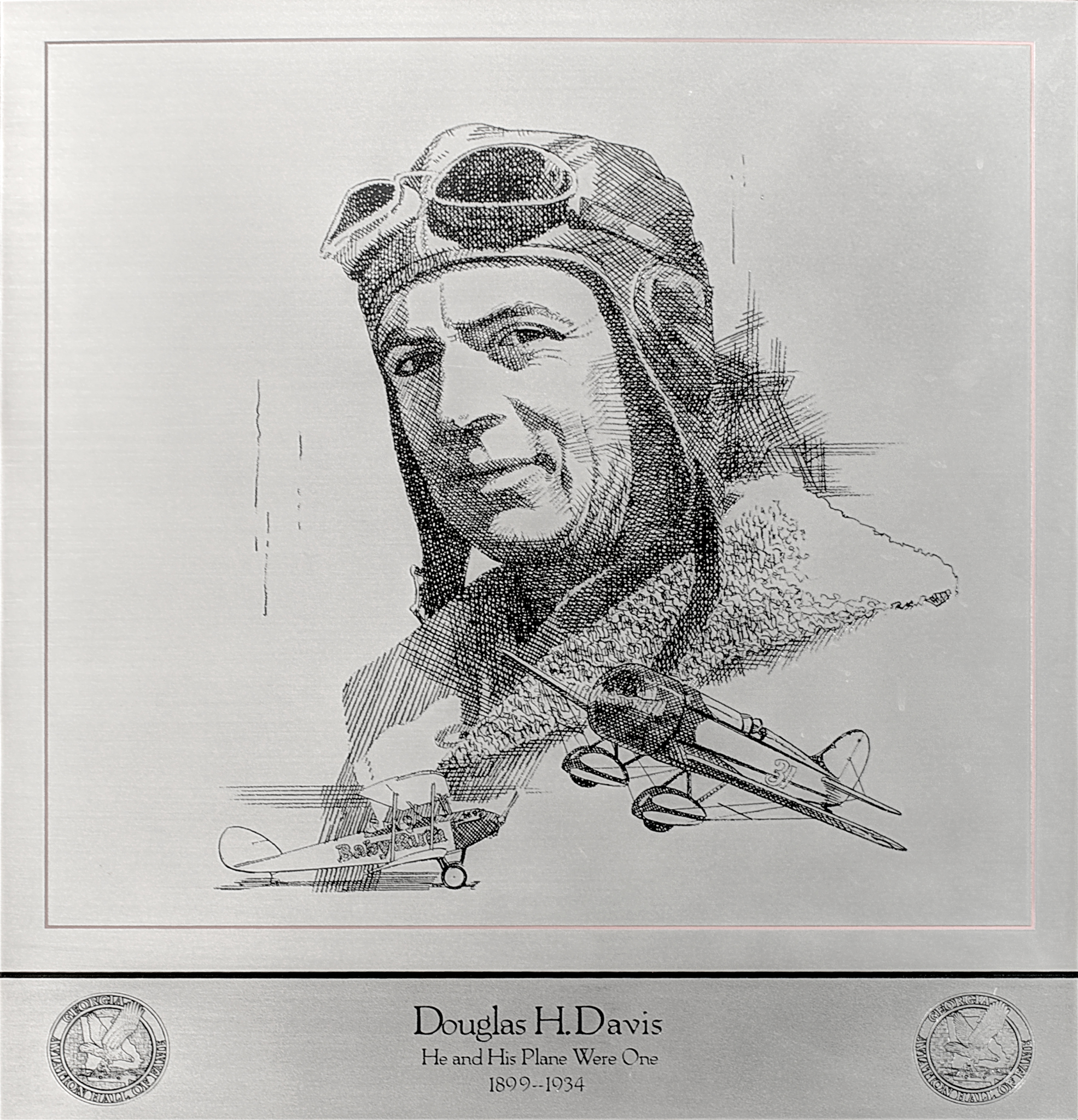
Plaque of Davis at the Georgia Aviation Hall of Fame

Davis was inducted into the OX5 Club of America Hall of Fame in 1972 and the Georgia Aviation Hall of Fame in 1991. There is a statue of him beside one of Eddie Rickenbacker in the National Air and Space Museum in Washington, DC.
