= J. David Crum =

American politician

Member of the Kansas House of Representatives from the 77th district
- In office January 8, 2007 – January 12, 2015
- Preceded by: Everett Johnson
- Succeeded by: Kristey Williams

Personal details
- Born: December 31, 1945 (age 80) Clay Center, Kansas, U.S.
- Party: Republican
- Spouse: Betty
- Children: 2
- Education: University of Houston

J. David Crum (born December 31, 1945, in Clay Center, Kansas) is a former Republican member of the Kansas House of Representatives, representing the 77th district. He served from 2007 to 2015.

Crum, who received his BS and OD from the University of Houston, has worked as an optometrist since 1969. He was the mayor of Augusta, Kansas from 1990 to 1998.

In the past Crum has served as president for Kansas Eyecare Services, Kansas Optometric Association, and Augusta Kiwanas Club. The American Conservative Union has given him a rating of 100%. He lives in Augusta, Kansas, is married to Betty Crum, and has two children.

== Committee membership ==
- Appropriations
- Health and Human Services (Vice-Chair)
- Social Services Budget

== Major donors ==
The top 5 donors to Crum's 2008 campaign were professional organizations:

- 1. Kansas Dental Assoc $850
- 2. Kansas Hospital Assoc $750
- 3. Kansas Bankers Assoc $750
- 4. Kansas Independent Business PAS $750
- 5. Kansas Chamber of Commerce $750
