= Dick Nichols =

American politician and banker (1926–2019)

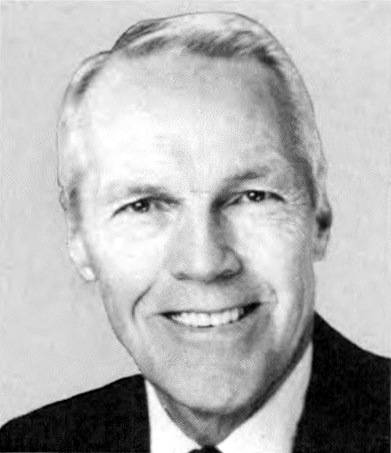

Member of the U.S. House of Representatives from Kansas's 5th district
- In office January 3, 1991 – January 3, 1993
- Preceded by: Bob Whittaker
- Succeeded by: District eliminated in reapportionment following the 1990 Census

Personal details
- Born: Richard Dale Nichols; April 29, 1926 Fort Scott, Kansas, U.S.
- Died: March 7, 2019 (aged 92) McPherson, Kansas, U.S.
- Party: Republican
- Spouses: Connie Weinbrenner (m. 1951; died 1994) Linda Nichols (m. 1996)
- Education: Kansas State University
- Profession: Banker

Richard Dale Nichols (April 29, 1926 – March 7, 2019) was an American banker and politician who served one-term as the U.S. representative from Kansas's 5th congressional district.

== Life and career ==
Born in Fort Scott, Kansas, Nichols attended the public schools. He earned his B.S. from Kansas State University in 1951, after serving as an ensign in the United States Navy from 1944 to 1947.

Nichols was informational counsel to the Kansas State Board of Agriculture, served as associate farm director of radio and television stations in Topeka, Kansas, and was agricultural representative of a bank in Hutchinson, Kansas. From 1969 until he resigned in 1990 after being elected to Congress, Nichols served as president and chairman of the board of Home State Bank in McPherson, Kansas.

He served as a member of the Kansas State Republican Executive Committee, was a delegate to the 1988 Republican National Convention, and was the Republican Party chair for the Fifth Congressional District from 1986 to 1990.

In July 1986, Nichols and his wife were stabbed by an insane man aboard the Staten Island Ferry while touring New York City. He fully recovered from his wounds and was visited by Mayor Ed Koch in the hospital.

Nichols was elected as a Republican to the One Hundred Second Congress (January 3, 1991 – January 3, 1993), representing Kansas's 5th congressional district. He narrowly beat future FDIC Chairwoman Sheila Bair in a 6-way Republican primary. In the reapportionment following the 1990 Census, Kansas was reduced from five House seats to four. Nichols' district was dismantled, with its territory split between the neighboring 2nd and 4th districts. Nichols had his home drawn into the 4th district and ran for the Republican nomination to challenge Dan Glickman in the 1992 election. He lost in the primary to state Senator Eric R. Yost, who lost to Glickman in the general election.

== Personal life ==
Nichols married Connie Weinbrenner in 1951, and together had three children. Connie earned four degrees and was a professor at McPherson College before her death from cancer in 1994. Two years later, Nichols married his second wife, Linda.

Dick Nichols died at his home in McPherson, Kansas, on March 7, 2019, at the age of 92.
