= William D. Vincent =

American politician

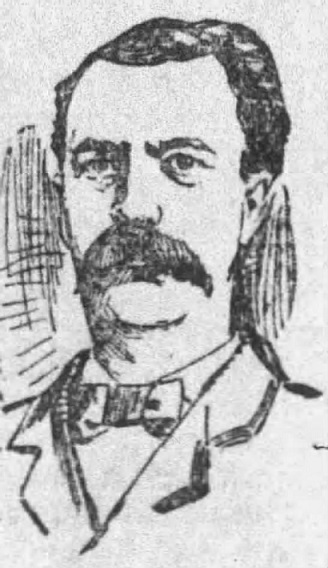
- From the Anaconda Standard (Anaconda, Montana), March 4, 1897

Member of the U.S. House of Representatives from Kansas's 5th district
- In office March 4, 1897 – March 3, 1899
- Preceded by: William A. Calderhead
- Succeeded by: William A. Calderhead

Personal details
- Born: October 11, 1852 Dresden, Tennessee
- Died: February 28, 1922 (aged 69) St. Louis, Missouri
- Party: Populist

William Davis Vincent (October 11, 1852 – February 28, 1922) was a U.S. representative from Kansas.

Born near Dresden, Tennessee, Vincent moved with his parents to Riley County, Kansas, in 1858 and to Manhattan, Kansas, in 1864. He attended the public schools and the State agricultural college in Manhattan, Kansas. Vincent engaged in business in Manhattan 1872–1876.

He moved to Clay Center, Kansas, in 1878 and engaged in mercantile pursuits. Vincent was elected as a member of the city council in 1880. He served as member of the State board of railroad commissioners in 1893 and 1894.

Vincent was elected as a Populist to the Fifty-fifth Congress (March 4, 1897 – March 3, 1899). He engaged in the hardware business in Clay Center, Kansas, until his death in St. Louis, Missouri on February 28, 1922. He was interred in Greenwood Cemetery, Clay Center, Kansas.

U.S. House of Representatives
Preceded by William A. Calderhead	Member of the U.S. House of Representatives from Kansas's 5th congressional district 1897 – 1899	Succeeded by William A. Calderhead
