= Newt Male =

American politician

Member of the Kansas House of Representatives from the 77th district
- In office 1973–1974
- Preceded by: Billy McCray
- Succeeded by: Bob Whittaker

Personal details
- Born: June 8, 1933 Pueblo, Colorado
- Died: April 20, 2003
- Party: Republican
- Spouse: Maxine Snider (m. 1958)

Walter Newton "Newt" Male Jr. (June 8, 1933–April 20, 2003) was an American politician who served as a Republican member of the Kansas House of Representatives from 1973 to 1974. He represented the 77th District and lived in Augusta, Kansas. He was succeeded by fellow Republican Bob Whittaker.
