= Kansas's 5th congressional district =

Former U.S. House district from 1885 to 1993

- Obsolete district
- Created: 1885
- Eliminated: 1993
- Years active: 1885-1993

Kansas's 5th congressional district is an obsolete district for representation in the United States House of Representatives.

It existed from 1885 to 1993.

== Geography ==
In its final configuration, the district was centered around Pittsburg, and stretched as far as the southern suburbs of Wichita. Most of the district was rural.

== List of members representing the district ==
Member	Party	Years	Cong ress	Electoral history
District created March 4, 1885
John A. Anderson (Manhattan)	Republican	March 4, 1885 – March 3, 1887	49th 50th 51st	Redistricted from the 1st and re-elected in 1884. Re-elected in 1886 as an Independent Republican. Re-elected in 1888 as a Republican. Retired.
John A. Anderson (Manhattan)	Independent Republican	March 4, 1887 – March 3, 1889	49th 50th 51st	Redistricted from the 1st and re-elected in 1884. Re-elected in 1886 as an Independent Republican. Re-elected in 1888 as a Republican. Retired.
John A. Anderson (Manhattan)	Republican	March 4, 1889 – March 3, 1891	49th 50th 51st	Redistricted from the 1st and re-elected in 1884. Re-elected in 1886 as an Independent Republican. Re-elected in 1888 as a Republican. Retired.
John Davis (Junction City)	Populist	March 4, 1891 – March 3, 1895	52nd 53rd	Elected in 1890. Re-elected in 1892. Lost re-election.
William A. Calderhead (Marysville)	Republican	March 4, 1895 – March 3, 1897	54th	Elected in 1894. Lost re-election.
William D. Vincent (Clay Center)	Populist	March 4, 1897 – March 3, 1899	55th	Elected in 1896. Lost re-election.
William A. Calderhead (Marysville)	Republican	March 4, 1899 – March 3, 1911	56th 57th 58th 59th 60th 61st	Elected in 1898. Re-elected in 1900. Re-elected in 1902. Re-elected in 1904. Re-elected in 1906. Re-elected in 1908. Lost renomination.
Rollin R. Rees (Minneapolis)	Republican	March 4, 1911 – March 3, 1913	62nd	Elected in 1910. Lost re-election.
Guy T. Helvering (Marysville)	Democratic	March 4, 1913 – March 3, 1919	63rd 64th 65th	Elected in 1912. Re-elected in 1914. Re-elected in 1916. Lost re-election.
James G. Strong (Blue Rapids)	Republican	March 4, 1919 – March 3, 1933	66th 67th 68th 69th 70th 71st 72nd	Elected in 1918. Re-elected in 1920. Re-elected in 1922. Re-elected in 1924. Re-elected in 1926. Re-elected in 1928. Re-elected in 1930. Redistricted to 1st and lost renomination to Lambertson.
William A. Ayres (Wichita)	Democratic	March 4, 1933 – August 22, 1934	73rd	Redistricted from the 8th district and Re-elected in 1932. Resigned when appointed to the Federal Trade Commission.
Vacant		August 22, 1934 – January 3, 1935	73rd	
John M. Houston (Newton)	Democratic	January 3, 1935 – January 3, 1943	74th 75th 76th 77th	Elected in 1934. Re-elected in 1936. Re-elected in 1938. Re-elected in 1940. Redistricted to 4th and lost re-election to Rees.
Clifford R. Hope (Garden City)	Republican	January 3, 1943 – January 3, 1957	78th 79th 80th 81st 82nd 83rd 84th	Redistricted from the 7th district and re-elected in 1942. Re-elected in 1944. Re-elected in 1946. Re-elected in 1948. Re-elected in 1950. Re-elected in 1952. Re-elected in 1954. Retired.
James F. Breeding (Rolla)	Democratic	January 3, 1957 – January 3, 1963	85th 86th 87th	Elected in 1956. Re-elected in 1958. Elected in 1960. Lost re-election.
Joe Skubitz (Pittsburg)	Republican	January 3, 1963 – December 31, 1978	88th 89th 90th 91st 92nd 93rd 94th 95th	Elected in 1962. Re-elected in 1964. Re-elected in 1966. Re-elected in 1968. Re-elected in 1970. Re-elected in 1972. Re-elected in 1974. Re-elected in 1976. Retired and resigned early.
Vacant		December 31, 1978 – January 3, 1979	95th	
Bob Whittaker (Augusta)	Republican	January 3, 1979 – January 3, 1991	96th 97th 98th 99th 100th 101st	Elected in 1978. Re-elected in 1980. Re-elected in 1982. Re-elected in 1984. Re-elected in 1986. Re-elected in 1988. Retired.
Dick Nichols (McPherson)	Republican	January 3, 1991 – January 3, 1993	102nd	Elected in 1990. Redistricted to the 4th district and lost renomination there.
District eliminated January 3, 1993
