= John Alexander Anderson =

American politician (1834–1892)

John A. Anderson
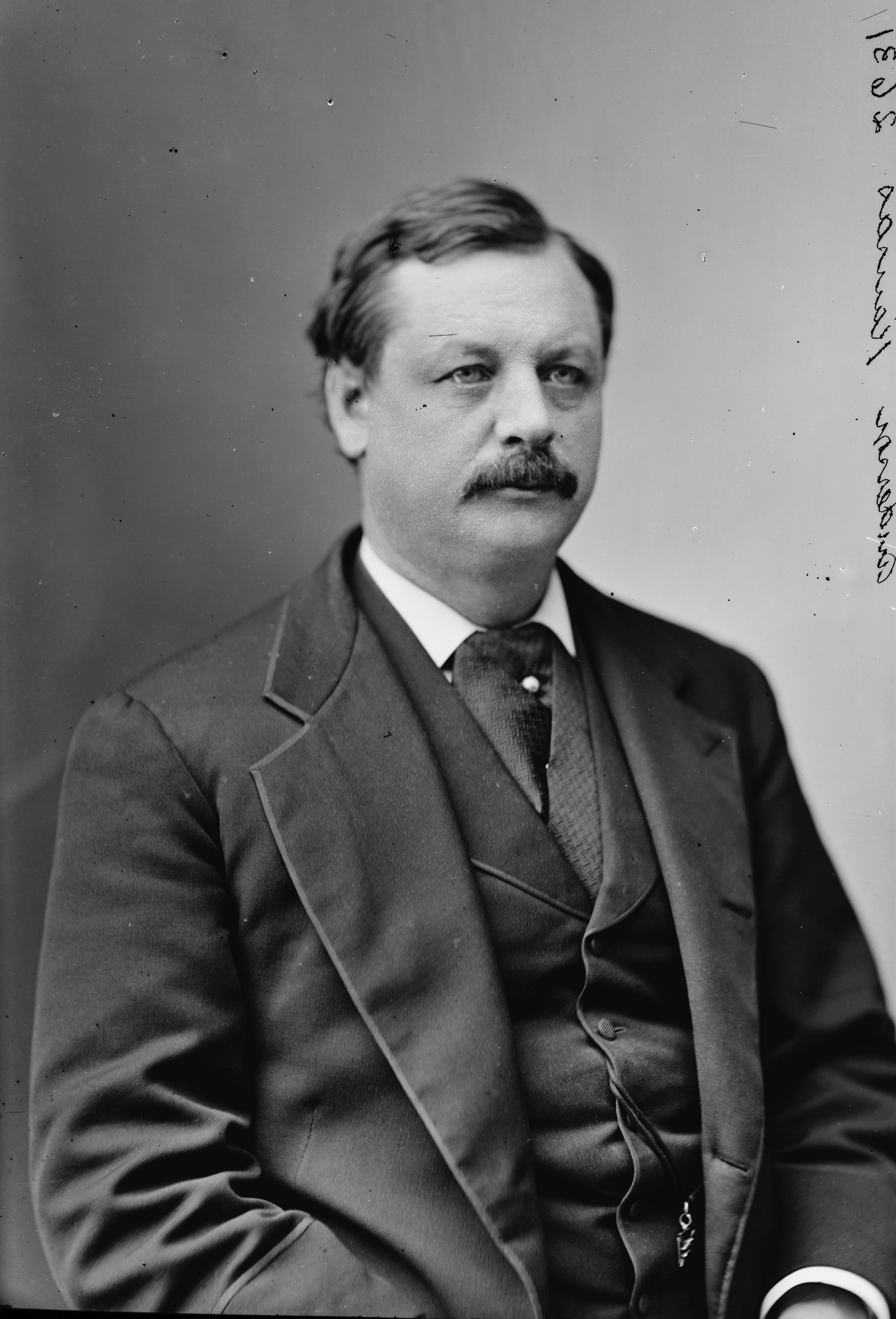

Member of the U.S. House of Representatives from Kansas
- In office March 4, 1879 – March 3, 1891
- Preceded by: William A. Phillips (1st); District established (5th)
- Succeeded by: Edmund N. Morrill (1st); John Davis (5th)
- Constituency: 1st district (1879-85); 5th district (1885-91)

Personal details
- Born: June 26, 1834 Washington County, Pennsylvania, US
- Died: May 18, 1892 (aged 57) Liverpool, England, UK
- Party: Republican
- Education: Miami University

John Alexander Anderson (June 26, 1834 – May 18, 1892) was an American politician and academic who served six terms as a U.S. representative for Kansas from 1879 to 1891, and the second president of Kansas State University from 1873 to 1879.

== Early life and education ==
Anderson was born in Washington County, Pennsylvania in 1834, and graduated from Miami University in Oxford, Ohio, in 1853. His father, William Caldwell Anderson, served as the fourth president of Miami University during this time, holding that position from 1849 to 1854. Future U.S. president Benjamin Harrison was his roommate for a time in college, where they were both members of Phi Delta Theta fraternity.

== Ministry and university presidency ==
Following graduation, John Anderson entered the Presbyterian ministry and was ordained four years later. His first charge was located in San Francisco, where he served until 1862 when he was appointed chaplain of the 3rd California Volunteer Infantry. In this capacity, he accompanied General Patrick Edward Connor and the regiment on its expedition to Salt Lake City, Utah. Alexander resigned from this role in the spring of 1863, and he was subsequently appointed relief agent, United States Sanitary Commission, a post he held until 1867.

In 1868, Anderson came to Kansas as pastor of the First Presbyterian church in Junction City. He soon became a vocal critic of the fact that Kansas State Agricultural College, the land-grant university in neighboring Manhattan, Kansas, was focusing on providing a classic liberal arts education rather than a practical agricultural education. Partly as a result of his advocacy, the Kansas Board of Regents appointed Anderson the second president of Kansas State on September 1, 1873. Anderson's tenure was marked by pedagogical reform in which academic emphasis was subordinated to a more practical approach to applied agriculture.

== Political career ==
Anderson was elected as a Republican to the U.S. House of Representatives in 1878, but he continued to serve as head of Kansas State until September 1879, when he resigned. He was reelected to congress three times before failing to receive the Republican nomination in 1886. Anderson promptly switched from the Republican party to running as an Independent Republican and won reelection anyway. In 1888, he was elected to his final term, again as a Republican.

After his congressional career ended, his former college roommate, President Benjamin Harrison, appointed Anderson consul general to Cairo, Egypt in 1891. However, Anderson grew ill in the execution of his duties and died in Liverpool, England in 1892 while in transit back to the United States.

== Legacy ==
Anderson Hall, the administrative building on the campus of Kansas State University, is named in his honor. The building, which was under construction during his tenure at Kansas State, is listed on the National Register of Historic Places.

U.S. House of Representatives
| Preceded by District created | Member of the U.S. House of Representatives from Kansas's 1st district 1879–1885 | Succeeded by John Davis |
| Preceded by William Addison Phillips | Member of the U.S. House of Representatives from Kansas's 5th district 1885–1891 | Succeeded by Edmund N. Morrill |
U.S. House of Representatives
Academic offices
| Preceded by Joseph Denison | President of Kansas State University; 1873–1879 | Succeeded by George Fairchild |
