= William A. Calderhead =

American politician

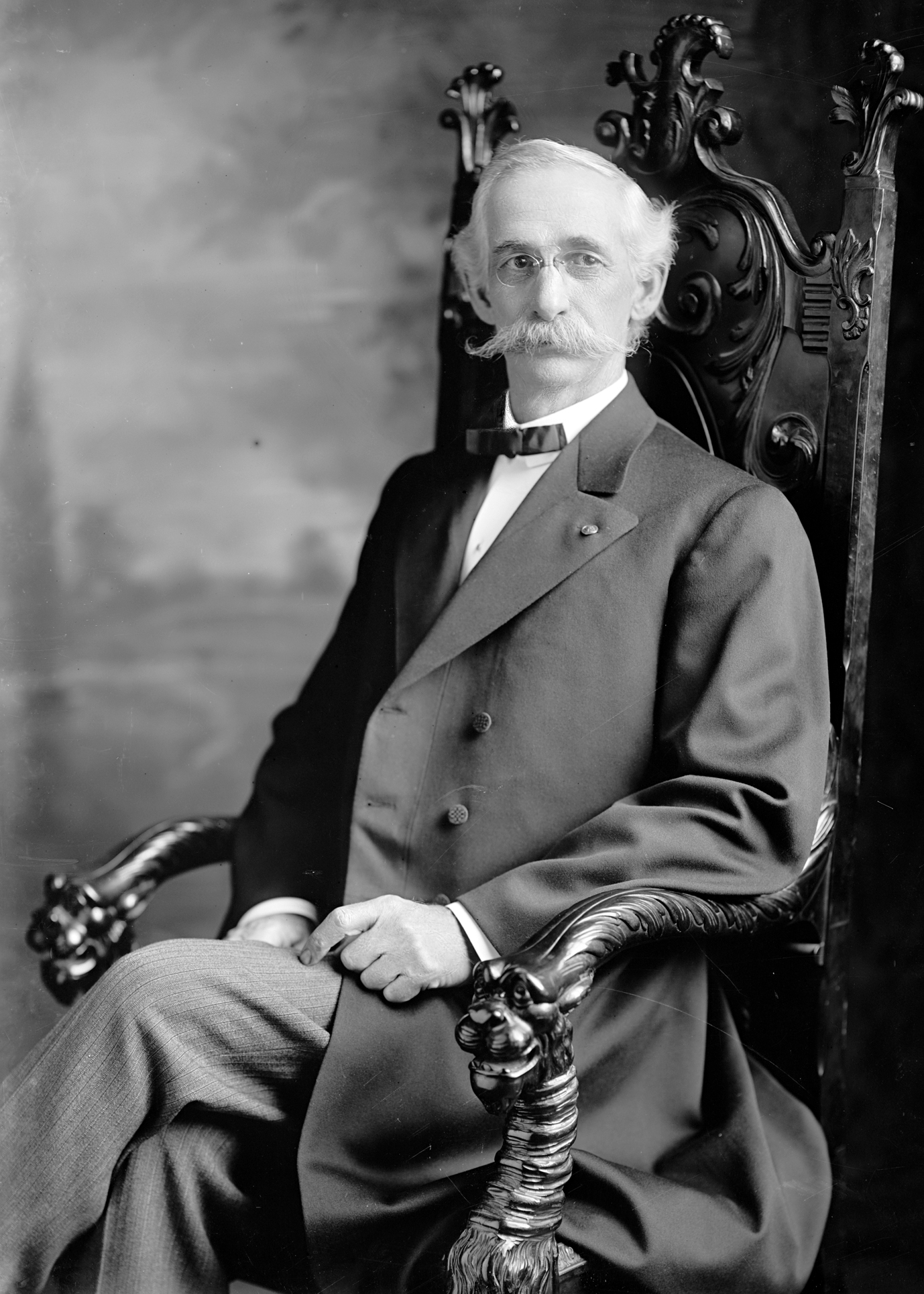

Member of the U.S. House of Representatives from Kansas's 5th district
- In office March 4, 1899 – March 3, 1911
- Preceded by: William D. Vincent
- Succeeded by: Rollin R. Rees
- In office March 4, 1895 – March 3, 1897
- Preceded by: John Davis
- Succeeded by: William D. Vincent

Personal details
- Born: September 26, 1844 New Lexington, Ohio
- Died: December 18, 1928 (aged 84) Enid, Oklahoma
- Party: Republican

William Alexander Calderhead (September 26, 1844 – December 18, 1928) was a U.S. representative from Kansas.

== Biography ==
Born on a farm near New Lexington in Perry County, Ohio, Calderhead received private schooling and also attended the common schools and Franklin College in New Athens, Ohio. During the Civil War, he enlisted in August 1862 as a private in Company H, 126th Regiment, Ohio Volunteer Infantry, One Hundred and Twenty-sixth Regiment, Ohio Volunteer Infantry. He was transferred to Company D, Ninth Veteran Reserves, for disability incurred in service and discharged June 27, 1865.

He moved to Harvey County, Kansas, in 1868 and engaged in agricultural pursuits near Newton. Four years later, he moved into Newton and taught school and studied law. He was admitted to the bar in 1875. He moved to Atchison, and continued to study law. He also engaged in teaching. He settled in Marysville, in 1879 and commenced the practice of law. He served as prosecuting attorney of Marshall County 1889–1891.

Calderhead was elected as a Republican to the Fifty-fourth Congress (March 4, 1895 – March 3, 1897). He was an unsuccessful candidate for reelection in 1896 to the Fifty-fifth Congress.

Calderhead was elected to the Fifty-sixth and to the five succeeding Congresses (March 4, 1899 – March 3, 1911), losing his party's nomination in 1910. He served as chairman of the Committee of Expenditures in the Department of Justice (Fifty-eighth and Fifty-ninth Congresses). He was one of 14 representatives, all Republicans, to oppose the Sixteenth Amendment to the United States Constitution, which imposed a federal income tax.

He resumed the practice of law in Marysville, Kansas, until 1920, when he retired from active business pursuits and moved to Enid, Oklahoma, where he died on December 18, 1928. He was interred in Marysville Cemetery at Marysville.

Calderhead was the father of Iris Calderhead, a prominent suffragist.

== Notes ==
- United States Congress. "William A. Calderhead (id: C000026)". Biographical Directory of the United States Congress.

U.S. House of Representatives
Preceded by John Davis	Member of the U.S. House of Representatives from Kansas's 5th congressional district 1895 – 1897	Succeeded by William D. Vincent
Preceded by William D. Vincent	Member of the U.S. House of Representatives from Kansas's 5th congressional district 1899 – 1911	Succeeded by Rollin R. Rees
