= Peggy Palmer =

American politician (born 1945)

Member of the Kansas Senate from the 16th district
- In office January 10, 2005 – January 12, 2009
- Preceded by: David R. Corbin
- Succeeded by: Ty Masterson

Member of the Kansas House of Representatives from the 77th district
- In office January 13, 1997 – January 13, 2003
- Preceded by: Kenneth King
- Succeeded by: Everett Johnson

Personal details
- Born: July 6, 1945 (age 81) Wichita, Kansas
- Party: Republican
- Spouse: Tom Palmer

Peggy R. Palmer (born July 6, 1945) is an American former realtor and politician from Kansas. She served as a Republican in both chambers of the Kansas State Legislature, and as a county commissioner for Butler County.

Palmer was born in Wichita. She worked as a campaign manager for Kenneth King during his successful run for the Kansas House of Representatives. She lived for ten years in Saudi Arabia, after her husband, Tom Palmer, was sent there to work for Mobil Oil. The couple returned to Kansas in 1994, and Palmer credits her time in Saudi Arabia with leading her to enter public service in America. As a state legislator, she lived in Augusta, Kansas, where she worked as a realtor.

After returning from Saudi Arabia, Palmer ran for the State House when King retired in 1996, with his endorsement. She won, and was re-elected in 1998 and 2000. In 2004, Palmer successfully challenged fellow Republican David R. Corbin in the primary election for Kansas State Senate in the 16th district, taking 61% of the vote. She cruised to victory in the 2004 general election as well, with 69% of the vote.

Palmer declined to run for re-election to the Senate in 2008. She was succeeded by Ty Masterson. She was appointed to a county commissioner seat in Butler County in 2010 and was re-elected without opposition in 2012 before retiring from politics in 2017.
