= Joe Skubitz =

American politician (1906–2000)

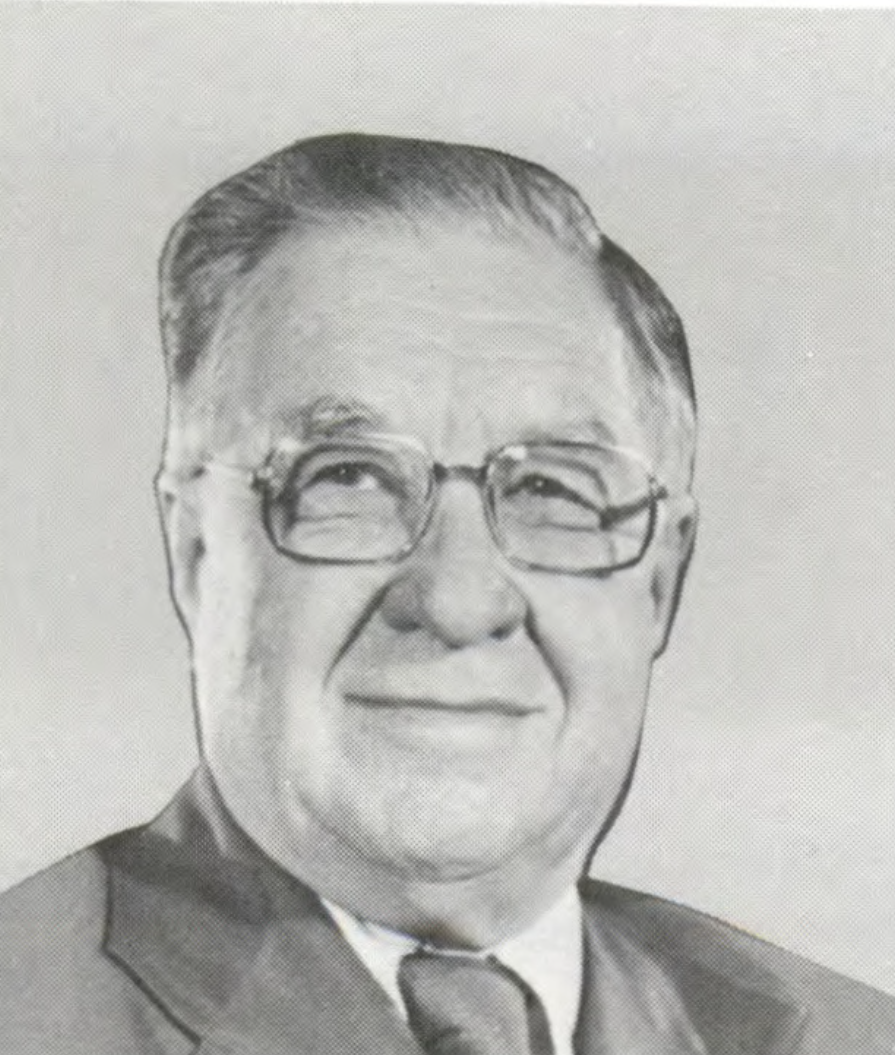

Member of the U.S. House of Representatives from Kansas's 5th district
- In office January 3, 1963 – December 31, 1978
- Preceded by: Walter L. McVey Jr. (redistricting)
- Succeeded by: Bob Whittaker

Personal details
- Born: May 6, 1906 Frontenac, Kansas, U.S.
- Died: September 11, 2000 (aged 94) Wichita, Kansas, U.S.
- Party: Republican
- Education: Pittsburg State University; Washburn University; George Washington University
- Profession: lawyer

Joe Skubitz (May 6, 1906 – September 11, 2000) was an American politician and U.S. representative from Kansas.

== Early life ==
Skubitz was born in Frontenac, Crawford County, Kansas; his parents were immigrants from Slovenia. He attended grade school in Ringo, Kansas, and high schools in Girard and Frontenac, Kansas.

After high school he attended Kansas Teachers College of Pittsburg (now Pittsburg State University), receiving a B.S. in 1929 and an M.S. in 1934. He attended law school at Washburn University, Topeka, Kansas, in 1938, and graduated from the law school of George Washington University, Washington, D.C., earning an LL.B. in 1944. He was admitted to the bar in 1944 and commenced practice in Kansas and the District of Columbia.

Skubitz served as administrative assistant to U.S. Senator Clyde M. Reed from 1939 to 1949, and to U.S. Senator Andrew F. Schoeppel from 1949 to 1962. He served as a delegate to the Republican National Convention in 1960.

He was elected as a Republican to the Eighty-eighth through the Ninety-fifth Congresses and served from January 3, 1963, until his resignation December 31, 1978. He did not seek renomination in 1978.

Skubitz died in Wichita, Sedgwick County, Kansas, on September 11, 2000. He was interred at Old Mission Cemetery, Wichita, Kansas.

U.S. House of Representatives
Preceded by James F. Breeding	Member of the U.S. House of Representatives from Kansas's 5th congressional district January 3, 1963 – December 31, 1978	Succeeded by Bob Whittaker
