= Everett Johnson =

American politician (b. 1936, d. 2014)

Member of the Kansas House of Representatives from the 77th district
- In office 2003–2006
- Preceded by: Peggy Palmer
- Succeeded by: J. David Crum

Personal details
- Born: February 25, 1936 Augusta, Kansas
- Died: July 22, 2014 Tucson, Arizona
- Party: Republican
- Spouse: Marsha Sue Meyers (m. 1956)
- Children: 2
- Education: University of Kansas (Ph.D)

Everett Johnson (February 25, 1936–July 22, 2014) was an American politician who served as a Republican member of the Kansas House of Representatives from 2003 to 2006. He represented the 77th District and lived in Augusta, Kansas.

Prior to his election, Johnson worked as a professor at Wichita State University, where he was the chair of the electrical and computer engineering department. He retired from teaching in 2000, and entered politics. Johnson was elected to the state House in 2002; he declined to run for re-election in 2006.
