= Kansas Commission on Civil Rights =

US state government commission

The Kansas Commission on Civil Rights (KCCR), originally known as the Commission on Civil Rights (CCR), was established in 1961 and continued until 1991 for the purpose of preventing unfair and illegal acts of discrimination against persons in Kansas. It consisted of a seven-member, unpaid-volunteer governing and review board, and a staff of paid investigators managed by an executive director.

The KCCR was established by the Kansas Legislature in an attempt to prevent and remedy certain acts of discrimination against people in Kansas for reasons of their race and certain other demographic characteristics, particularly those whose personal characteristics were believed by the legislature to put them at a disadvantage in society.

The list of those protected classes grew over the subsequent years to include:

- race
- color
- national origin
- ancestry
- sex
- handicap / disability
- age
- marital and/or familial status
- genetic testing

In a 1990 agreement between the KCCR and the U.S. Department of Justice's Office of Special Counsel for Immigration Related Unfair Employment Practices, the KCCR's role, at that time, was partially defined (in regards to employment) as:

The [KCCR] is charged with the enforcement of the provisions of the Kansas Act Against Discrimination and the Age Discrimination in Employment Act that prohibit discrimination in employment on the basis of race, color, religion, national origin, sex, physical handicap, ancestry or age.

== Authorizing law ==
The authorizing and empowering legislation was enclosed chiefly in the Kansas Statutes Chapter 44: Labor And Industries, Article 10: Kansas Acts Against Discrimination.

The law initially forbade discrimination on the basis of race, color, religion, national origin or ancestry—in restaurants, hotels, motels, and cabin camps, and in employment in enterprises employing four or more people.

The law expanded on July 1, 1965, to include a wide range of public accommodations including "trailer court, bar, tavern, barber shop, beauty parlor, theater, skating rink, bowling alley, billiard parlor, amusement park, recreation park, swimming pool, lake, gymnasium, mortuary, cemetery which is open to the public or on any public transportation facility."

The broader 1965 law also granted the KCCR the authority to obtain subpoenas, if deemed necessary, to aid an investigation or to produce evidence and witnesses for a public hearing.

In the 1970s, the Kansas Legislature expanded the KCCR's scope to include discrimination based on sex or physical handicap.

Also in the 1970s, the Legislature further expanded KCCR's role by authorizing it to investigate any company contracting with governmental units, to determine possible Kansas Civil Rights Act violations.

== History ==
The KCCR (established in 1961) evolved from the state's Anti-Discrimination Commission (established in 1953), and was eventually reorganized and reauthorized in 1991 as the Kansas Human Rights Commission (KHRC).

The 1953 Anti-Discrimination Commission grew out of the emerging Civil Rights Movement in the U.S., which had particular impact in the Kansas capital, Topeka, where the pivotal racial legal case Brown v. Board of Education emerged, ultimately forcing an end to legally mandated or officially sanctioned, racial segregation of public schools not only in Topeka, and throughout Kansas, but nationwide. The 1953 commission, and its empowering statutes, extended this ban on racial discrimination in Kansas to cover employment—but had no enforcement provisions.

In 1961, the Anti-Discrimination Commission was converted into the Kansas Commission on Civil Rights (KCCR), with new legislation that prohibited discrimination in employment in Kansas for reasons of race, religion, color, national origin, or ancestry.

The commission's clout included authority to initiate charges of discrimination in public accommodation and employment when evidence suggested it, but Commission could not intervene in housing cases unless an aggrieved individual brought a charge.

The KCCR was designed to be an office of investigators overseen by a seven-member board of volunteer commissioners, but in subsequent years it became difficult to keep a full board, for lack of active volunteers.

However, in the early 1970s, under Governor Robert Docking, the KCCR board gained new powers and began taking a more aggressive role in enforcement:

- In 1970, the law authorizing KCCR action was amended to allow the commission to initiate investigations without waiting for an individual to make a formal complaint.
- In 1971, a four-year black employee of the commission, Troy G. Scroggins, was promoted to executive director, overseeing the staff of investigators. (Scroggins was replaced in 1972 by Anthony D. Lopez, who led the staff until mid-1978.)
- In May 1971, appointments by Gov. Docking reduced the commission's white majority to a minority—resulting in a Commission with three black commissioners, and two Mexican-American commissioners, and two white commissioners.

The Commission continued in operation until 1991 when revisions to the statutes converted the KCCR into the Kansas Human Rights Commission (KHRC).

== See also ==
- Wichita Civil Rights Equal Employment Opportunity Commission (CREEOC) - largely patterned on the KCCR -which served a similar role within the City of Wichita, Kansas. The two organizations referred cases to each other, depending upon jurisdictional issues.
