= Gail Finney =

American politician (1959–2022)

Member of the Kansas House of Representatives from the 84th district
- In office January 1, 2009 – August 20, 2022
- Preceded by: Oletha Faust-Goudeau
- Succeeded by: Ford Carr

Personal details
- Born: August 16, 1959 Wichita, Kansas, U.S.
- Died: August 20, 2022 (aged 63)
- Party: Democratic
- Spouse: Jerrold Finney
- Children: 3
- Education: Wichita State University; Friends University

Gail Finney (August 16, 1959 – August 20, 2022) was an American businesswoman and politician who was a Democratic member of the Kansas House of Representatives, who represented the 84th house district from 2009 until her death in 2022.

== Background ==
Finney was born in Wichita, Kansas. She was a graduate of Southeast High School, had a Bachelor of Business Administration degree from Wichita State University and an MBA from Friends University. She was a business owner.

== Political career ==
Finney served on the Wichita Chamber of Commerce's Visioneering Racial, Diversity, Opportunities, and Harmony Board; the District 1 Advisory Board, Precinct Committee Woman, and the Governor's Kansas African American Advisory Commission.

== Death ==
After a series of health problems, Finney died on August 20, 2022, aged 63. She had undergone a kidney transplant earlier in the year. She was posthumously given the key to the city of Wichita.
