= David R. Corbin =

American politician

David Corbin

Member of the Kansas Senate from the 16th district
- In office January 11, 1993 – January 10, 2005
- Preceded by: Frank Gaines
- Succeeded by: Peggy Palmer

Member of the Kansas House of Representatives from the 75th district
- In office January 14, 1991 – January 11, 1993

Personal details
- Born: July 20, 1944 (age 82) Wichita, Kansas, U.S.
- Party: Republican
- Spouse: Betty Corbin
- Children: 2

David R. Corbin (born July 20, 1944) is an American former politician and farmer. He served as a Republican in both the Kansas State Senate and the Kansas House of Representatives.

Corbin was born in Wichita, and was raised in the rural community of Towanda, Kansas; he is a fifth-generation farmer. In addition to farming, Corbin has expanded his business to include agritourism, using his farm to host weddings, host corporate meetings, and attract visitors to a large annual Christmas-themed display.

He ran for the Kansas House in 1990, taking office in January 1991, and served only one term there before moving upwards to successfully run for the State Senate in 1992. There, he was re-elected in 1996 and 2000, but in 2004 faced a primary election challenge from fellow Republican Peggy Palmer. Corbin was defeated in the primary, taking 39% of the vote to Palmer's 61%, and did not return to politics.
