= Ford Carr =

American politician

Member of the Kansas House of Representatives from the 84th district
- Incumbent
- Assumed office September 13, 2022
- Preceded by: Gail Finney

Personal details
- Born: October 19, 1966 (age 59)
- Party: Democratic
- Education: Southwestern College
- Profession: Aerospace engineer
- Website: Campaign website

Ford Carr (born October 19, 1966) is an American politician and aerospace engineer serving as a member of the Kansas House of Representatives for the 84th district. He assumed office in 2022, after the death of his predecessor, Gail Finney.

Carr is a graduate of Wichita East High School and obtained his bachelor's degree in business quality management and a master's degree in leadership from Southwestern College. He began a career in the aircraft industry in 1996, holding various positions at Boeing and Spirit AeroSystems.

== Electoral history ==
Carr was initially appointed to the state legislature in 2022, following the death of his predecessor, Gail Finney; he was unopposed in the primary and general election in that year, and in 2024 as well. Carr ran for re-election in 2026, but was defeated in the primary by Bonita Gooch, securing only 30% of the vote to Gooch's 70%.

== Community activism ==
Before entering the legislature, Carr was a community activist, gaining notoriety as founder of "Us Doing Us," a local nonprofit group, founded around 2014, that organized toy giveaways, Thanksgiving meals, and Sunday get-togethers for people raised in Wichita's African-American community. In December 2024 or January 2025, his "Us Doing Us" project was recognized on Wichita's Fox Kansas TV, receiving a $500 donation from a local law firm (DeVaughn-James Injury Lawyers)

== State Representative ==
Carr—an African-American—was elected to represent the 84th District of the Kansas House of Representatives. The district, in north-central/inner-northeast Wichita has the highest percentage of African-American voters in Sedgwick County, and the third-highest in Kansas, surpassed only by two districts in Wyandotte County (metropolitan Kansas City, Kansas). Wichita's neighboring 89th House District, has a single percentage point smaller proportion of Black voters. Slightly more than 30% of the district's residents are Black; about 40% are white; over 10% are multiracial; about 20% are Spanish-speaking.

When his district's state representative (Gail Finney, D-Wichita, 84th District) declined to run for re-election (due to health issues), she encouraged Carr to run for her seat. He was unopposed in both primary and general elections.

Carr indicated his concerns included banning the "legalized slavery" of using prison inmates for labor, addressing the state's "horrid" foster care system, and motivating people to be voters.

In the 2023 legislative session, concerns were raised that Carr was far less engaged with, and responsive to, his constituents, than his predecessor, Finney. Interviews with numerous constituents indicated he had not communicated with them directly—not through individual personal contact, nor legislative newsletters, nor any events where constituents could express their concerns, nor to enable the representative and his constituents to get acquainted.

The issue became public when Carr became the first Kansas House Democrat in 3 years to support a Republican bill to limit transgender youth participation in sports—a vote directly opposite his predecessor's votes on the issue. He also voted for a bill that would mandate separation of people in such places as domestic violence shelters or rape crisis centers, based on sex they were assigned at birth. Constituents contacted The Beacon News to complain.

Investigating, the news outlet discovered that Carr had indicated he listened to the district's faith community, and prioritized representation of the African-Americans in his district (the third-largest number of African-Americans in any Kansas House district) -- but found little evidence of any effort by Carr to get input from anyone on the issue. And Carr declined to provide any evidence of it. When the bill was overturned by a gubernatorial veto, Carr recanted his vote—but his recantation failed to prevent a GOP override of the veto, because another African-American representative, Marvin Robinson (D-Wyandotte County), voted for it.

== Controversy ==
=== 2023 ===
In 2023, Carr was admonished for calling a fellow African-American Democratic legislator—Marvin Robinson (D-Wyandotte County) -- a "house negro", as a slur for that legislator's appearance of vote-trading with Republicans. Some House Republicans complained—and House GOP leaders alleged, in a letter of warning—that Carr's remarks were a violation of Kansas House rules forbidding questioning the motives of fellow legislators, during statements in meetings of the legislature. Carr remained unrepentant, dismissing the GOP admonishment as white legislators' efforts to silence a black legislator.

=== 2025 ===
In January 2025 — during an informal gathering of Wichita-area state legislators, local officials, and lobbyists, at a Topeka bar — Carr was involved in an altercation (extensively documented by video) with Wichita City Councilman Brandon Johnson. The two had argued over the pace of state and local funding for a public health issue in an area of Wichita that both men represented. Media reported that audio in their video was redacted because of a racial slur Carr made, and other profanities. When other officials attempted to separate the two, video indicates that Carr apparently knocked one of them down: 73-year-old State Rep. Henry Helgerson.

Topeka Police were called, but when they arrived, Kansas Highway Patrol had already responded, and determined that none of the parties wanted to file charges.

Afterward, in response to media inquiries, Johnson declined comment on the event, except to say that the "event will be properly investigated," and to claim "positive efforts and progress" on the issue they argued about.

Several witnesses blamed Carr for the altercation. But Carr, defiant, blamed Johnson for instigating the conflict with a gesture—Carr adding that he would "always escalate that aggression to... match the energy with... equal or greater force." He added that if getting "physical" is what he has to do "in defense of my people," he was prepared to do that. Carr implied he was just "look[ing] out for my community," and criticized the pace that the issue was being addressed. He nevertheless expressed regret for Helgerson's fall, saying his intent was not to hurt Helgerson, but to get him "out of the way."

The incident sparked suggestions of Carr's expulsion from the House, and House Minority (Democratic) Leader Brandon Woodard (D-Lenexa), issued a statement saying their caucus is "taking the issue seriously"—but said "no hearings have been called," nor any "decisions made about repercussions."
