= Oletha Faust-Goudeau =

American politician

Member of the Kansas Senate from the 29th district
- Incumbent
- Assumed office January 3, 2009
- Preceded by: Donald Betts

Member of the Kansas House of Representatives from the 84th district
- In office January 26, 2004 – January 3, 2009
- Preceded by: Donald Betts
- Succeeded by: Gail Finney

Personal details
- Born: August 5, 1959 (age 67) Wichita, Kansas, U.S.
- Party: Democratic
- Children: 2
- Education: Wichita State University
- Occupation: Community activist

Oletha A. Goudeau (August 5, 1959) is a Democratic member of the Kansas Senate, representing the 29th district (central/northeast Wichita) since 2009—the first African-American woman in the Kansas Senate. Most recently, she is the Senate Assistant Minority Leader.

She was previously a Kansas Representative, serving from her appointment in 2004 until 2009.

She is a community activist from Wichita.

== Early life and education ==
Born August 5, 1959 in Wichita, Kansas, Faust-Goudeau is one of five children of Oretha Faust, a prominent inner-city Wichita community activist and politician.

Faust-Goudeau studied pre-law at Wichita State University, and became a photographer and community activist.

== Kansas House of Representatives ==
In 2002, she ran for the seat of retiring Kansas State Representative Jonathan Wells, representing the 84th District (inner-city Wichita) - but was defeated by fellow Democrat Donald Betts. However, in 2003, Betts was appointed to fill a state senate vacancy, and by a vote of precinct committeemen and committeewomen, Faust-Goudeau was appointed to fill Betts' vacant seat in the Kansas House of Representatives. In 2004, she was elected to the seat, becoming the first African-American woman elected to represent the district. In 2006, she was re-elected to the seat.

== Kansas Senate ==
In 2008, Faust-Goudeau was elected to the Kansas Senate, representing the 29th District (Wichita) -- becoming, upon inauguration in 2009, the first African-American woman in the state senate's history, and one of the only two African-Americans in the Kansas Senate (as of January 2016). She is currently Senate Assistant Minority Leader.

She was re-elected by wide margins in 2012, 2016 (unopposed), and 2020, when she received 71.1% of the vote.

Her 29th Senate district—predominantly inner-city central/north-central and northeast Wichita—includes most of the minority neighborhoods—and the city's poorest people, along with its richest.

=== Positions ===
Faust-Goudeau characterizes herself as a "Republicrat," representing her district's voters regardless of party. Senate Minority Leader Anthony Hensley has characterized her as "the strongest pro-family legislator in the Legislature," building her career chiefly on helping families and children.

Faust-Goudeau's chief activity has been in protecting rights and services for seniors, the disabled, children, and the poor.—including children in state custody—and in promoting business/development interests. Some legislation which Faust-Goudeau introduced, which became law:

- "Grandparents' rights" bills, three of which she introduced, became law in 2006-2012—latest became law in 2012 with unanimous Legislative backing—essentially forcing the State and the courts to consider grandparents' for possible custody requests in most child-custody cases in which the State has intervened (e.g.: foster care cases). Prior laws she introduced required grandparents to be heard in foster-care cases, and—if caring for their grandchildren as foster parents—to be reimbursed by the state the same as foster parents.
- Firefighters' insurance bill — became law in 2012 with unanimous Legislative backing—ensuring that the families of firefighters killed in action are able to continue receiving protection under their firefighter's insurance coverage for the first 18 months following their firefighter's death in the line of duty.
- Drug paraphernalia prohibition bill — outlawing the distribution of certain kinds of drug paraphernalia, became law.
- Poor/working-class issues - Representing the inner-city area of Wichita (the state's largest city), Faust-Goudeau frequently takes the lead in speaking out on, and advocating for, the needs and interests of poor and working-class Kansans. Examples include:

- Opposing welfare restrictions. When the newly-libertarian Kansas Legislature in 2015 began a series of "attacks on the poor," these included bills introduced with exceptionally detailed lists of restrictions on welfare recipients, forbidding a wide range of purchases with welfare money, and limiting welfare cash disbursements to $30 per day, severely complicating bill-payment and other financial management issues for welfare recipients -- unusual restrictions which drew international attention. Faust-Goudeau was the most frequently cited opponent of the proposed restrictions. In 2023, she fought, successfully, against a bill that would have made Kansas the fourth state in the nation to withhold Supplemental Nutrition Assistance Program (SNAP) benefits from a parent owing child support.
- Food sales tax elimination bill. With the increasingly-libertarian Kansas Legislature in 2014-2015 opposing taxes at every turn, Faust-Goudeau joined with new Republican/libertarian legislator Michael O'Donnell to propose the elimination of sales taxes on food (widely decried as a "regressive" tax disproportionately affecting the poor and working class families, and outlawed in several other states). Specifically, their Senate Bill 263 would have eliminated the state tax on fruits and vegetables. At the time of the bill, the Kansas sales tax on groceries was among the highest in the nation (second only to Mississippi), further aggravated by Kansas localities often adding additional taxes to groceries. However, during a growing state funding crisis brought on by Republicans' previous tax-cutting measures, the grocery tax-relief bill faced little support from the Republican/Libertarian-controlled legislature and Governor. But, at the close of the 2015 Legislative Session, a variation of Faust-Goudeau's plan passed the Kansas Senate, and (at this writing, June 8, 2015) awaits House approval.
- Suspended and revoked drivers licenses: In the mid-2020s, Fast-Goudeau argued that the suspension or revocation of drivers' licenses, for failure to pay traffic fines, created a "death spiral" for those too poor to pay fines on time -- resulting in unemployment and deteriorating ability to pay, with no way out. Accordingly, she successfully pushed a series of bills granting restricted drivers' licenses for such drivers, to allow them to drive to work and other basically essential functions, while making fine payments. The last bill, SB 500, garnered rare, nearly unanimous votes in the legislature.
- Homeless veterans' assistance: In 2025-2026, Faust proposed allowing homeless veterans the opportunity to replace lost identification documents, at no cost. The measure became law.
- Eviction records expungement: In 2026, Faust-Goudeau proposed a bill to limit the duration of a tenant's visible eviction record. Her bill was blocked in the Senate Judiciary Committee, but its essence quickly re-emerged in another eviction-record-expungement bill that became law, with Faust-Goudeau serving on the Conference Committee that finalized it.

== Sedgwick County Commission candidacy ==
In 2010, Faust-Goudeau was the Democratic Party nominee for County Commissioner for the Sedgwick County 1st District. She was defeated by Republican Richard Ranzau.

== See also ==
- Kansas's 29th Senate district
