= Frank D. Gaines =

American politician (1934–2011)

Frank Gaines

Member of the Kansas Senate from the 16th district
- In office 1973–1992
- Succeeded by: David R. Corbin

Member of the Kansas House of Representatives from the 64th district
- In office 1967–1972

Personal details
- Born: April 21, 1934 Peabody, Kansas
- Died: December 25, 2011 Eureka, Kansas
- Party: Democratic
- Spouse: Beverly Hertlein (m. 1983)

Franklin D. Gaines (April 21, 1934 – December 25, 2011) was an American politician who served in the Kansas House of Representatives and Kansas State Senate.

Gaines was elected to the Kansas House in 1966, taking office in January 1967 and serving three terms total. In 1972, he was elected to the Kansas State Senate from the 16th district, where he spent 20 years, leaving office in 1992.

Gaines worked as an attorney.
