= Delaware Black Caucus =

Non-partisan American public policy organization

The Delaware Black Caucus, also known as the DBC, is a non-partisan American public policy, research and educational organization. The DBC is composed of African Americans elected as mayors, council members in the state of Delaware, as well as members of the Delaware General Assembly.

== Priorities ==
The mission of the DBC is to serve as a non-partisan policy-oriented catalyst that educates future leaders and promotes collaboration among legislators, business leaders, minority-focused organizational leaders, and organized labor to effect positive and sustainable change in the African American community. The DBC works to broaden and elevate the influence of African Americans in the political, legislative, and public policy arenas in Delaware. The DBC creates, identifies, analyzes and disseminates policy-oriented information critical to advancing African Americans and people of African descent towards equity in economics, health and education.

== Current membership ==
List of officers:

District	Officers	Position
2 (Senate)	Margaret Rose Henry	chair
(House)		
3 (Council)	Stephanie T. Bolden	treasurer

=== Members ===
- James Baker, Mayor, City of Wilmington
- Donald Blakey, Delaware State Rep. (R-Dover)
- Theodore "Ted" Blunt, Ex-President, Wilmington City Council
- Michael Brown, Wilmington City Council
- Margaret Rose Henry, Delaware State Sen. (D-Wilmington)
- Robin Fisher, Laurel Town Council
- Theopalis Gregory, Wilmington City Council
- J. J. Johnson, Delaware State Rep. (D-New Castle)
- Pat A. Jones, Seaford City Council
- Robert McGhee, Middletown Town Council
- Charles Potter, Wilmington City Council
- Sophia Russell, Dover City Council
- Reuben Salters, Dover City Council
- Hanifa Shabazz, Wilmington City Council
- Dennis Williams, Delaware State Rep. (D-Wilmington)
- Katrina Wilson, Milford City Council
