= Billy McCray =

American politician

Member of the Kansas Senate from the 29th district
- In office 1973–1984
- Succeeded by: Eugene Anderson

Member of the Kansas House of Representatives from the 77th district
- In office 1967–1972
- Succeeded by: Newt Male

Personal details
- Born: October 29, 1927 Geary, Oklahoma, U.S.
- Died: June 2, 2012 (aged 84) Wichita, Kansas
- Party: Democratic
- Spouse: Wyvette M. Williams (m. 1951)
- Children: At least 2, incl. Melody McCray-Miller

Billy Quincy McCray (October 29, 1927 – June 2, 2012) was an American politician who served in the Kansas State Senate and Kansas House of Representatives as a Democrat. As a member of the State Senate, he was the only African-American in the body.

== Early life and background ==
McCray was born in Geary, Oklahoma and married in 1951. He had several children, including Melody McCray-Miller, who would follow in his footsteps by joining the Kansas House. He worked at Boeing, and was among the first Black members of the company's photography team.

== Political career ==
In the 1966 elections, he won a seat in the Kansas House, and served there for three terms before moving up to the Kansas Senate in the 1972 elections. He served three terms in the 29th district before leaving the legislature. During his term in office, McCray was the only African-American member of the Kansas Senate.
