= U. L. Gooch =

American politician (1923–2021)

U. L. "Rip" Gooch

Member of the Kansas Senate from the 29th district
- In office January 11, 1993 – January 2, 2004
- Preceded by: Jim Ward
- Succeeded by: Donald Betts

Personal details
- Born: September 13, 1923 Ripley, Tennessee, U.S.
- Died: November 24, 2021 (aged 98)
- Party: Democratic
- Spouse: Augusta
- Occupation: Pilot, businessman

Military service
- Allegiance: United States
- Branch/service: United States Army
- Years of service: 1943–1946
- Battles/wars: World War II

Ulysses Lee Gooch (September 13, 1923 – November 24, 2021), often known as Rip Gooch, was an American pilot, aviation entrepreneur, and politician in Kansas. Gooch was a member of the Kansas Commission on Civil Rights, 1971–74; member of the Wichita City Council, 1989–93; and a Kansas state senator (D-Wichita, 29th District – central-northeast Wichita) from 1993 until retiring in January 2004 as the state's oldest serving senator, at 80. Gooch was one of the first inductees to the Black Aviation Hall of Fame.

== Early life ==
Gooch was born in Ripley, Tennessee, the son of rural Tennessee sharecroppers and the grandson of emancipated slaves, Gooch was orphaned at age four and fended for himself growing up in the 1920s and 1930s under the shadow of Jim Crow. Working in fields while watching airplanes fly overhead, he dreamed of escaping to a better life. While in high school, in 1943, during World War II, Gooch joined the Army, and was eventually shipped to the Philippines as a sergeant supervising a construction operation; he was discharged after the war in 1946. He graduated from his hometown's Lauderdale High School while in the military.

== Aviation career ==
Gooch subsequently began taking flight lessons on the GI Bill, earning his private pilot's license in 1947, and continued with advanced flight training at a private flying service. About this time, he met and married Augusta Fields (their marriage would last until her death 48 years later). While studying veterinary medicine at Tennessee State University (then Tennessee A & I University), Gooch continued his flight training, eventually becoming a commercial pilot and flight instructor. He became a part-time stunt flyer with the legendary airshow impresario Bill Sweet.

However, despite earning his wings, Gooch couldn't find full-time aviation work because he was black. In 1951, Gooch moved to Wichita, Kansas—a major aviation industrial center known as the "Air Capital City"—where he began to work for Boeing Airplane Company. After battling racism at Boeing while working as a Boeing inspector in the 1950s, he decided to start his own flight business, one of the first black-owned modern FBOs (general aviation fixed-base operations) in the U.S., which provided a stepping stone for a number of other black pilots.

In the late 1950s, at Wichita's Rawdon Airport, Gooch became owner/operator of its FBO, Aero Services, Inc. It provided flight training, charter flying, aircraft rental and storage, and sold used aircraft. Eventually, Aero Services became the Mooney Aircraft regional distributorship for Kansas and parts of Missouri (ironically right across the street from the factory of Mooney's chief rival Beech Aircraft). Gooch, with partner Dan La Master, extensively modernized Rawdon Field during 1962–1966. Gooch's enterprise, by 1972, had grown to operate an extensive government-contract air taxi operation, using a fleet of twin-engined Beech 18 transports and other aircraft, moving classified information between U.S. military bases in 17 states. Another section of the business overhauled military helicopter parts.

The loss of government contracts after the end of the Vietnam War—and the sale of the airport after the death of owner Herb Rawdon—led to the closure of Aero Services in 1976.

Following his 17 years of operating Aero Services., Gooch continued for 20 years as a freelance charter pilot, flight instructor and FAA-designated pilot examiner. For four years, he was a consultant to leading business-aircraft manufacturer Raytheon Aircraft (the name used for Beech Aircraft when under control of Raytheon Corporation).

In 1993, Gooch was the recipient of the annual Kansas Governor's Aviation Honor Award. The citation noted his involvement "on the Kansas Department of Transportation's Aviation Advisory Committee [and as] a member of the Aviation Museum Task Force, Wichita Airport Authority, Negro Airmen International, Tuskegee Airmen and Black Army Aviators." It further cited his role in providing flight training opportunity to young people:

He has given youth, particularly African-American youth, an opportunity to explore aviation up-close and personal. He operates a scholarship fund in memory of his son, Kerry Gooch. For two weeks every summer, he takes selected youth off the streets and gives them the opportunity to travel to Tuskegee, Alabama. There they participate in an aviation program that includes a solo performance at the controls of a Cessna aircraft.

In 2001, Gooch was inducted into the National Black Aviation Hall of Fame.

A Kansas Senate Resolution, honoring him in 2013, notes that:

Senator Gooch was instrumental in the formation of the International Black Aerospace Council, an umbrella organization of five major black aviation organizations. He has served on the Aviation Advisory Committee of the Kansas Department of Transportation, the Air Museum Task Force and the Wichita Airport Authority, and he is a member of the Kansas Aviation Museum Board...

Gooch logged 20,000 flight hours (over 18,000 as pilot-in-command).

== Political career ==
Gooch served on the Kansas Commission on Civil Rights from 1971 to 1974, as an appointee of Democratic Governor Robert Docking. His tenure coincided with the sharply increased enforcement activism of the KCCR.

One of the few African Americans elected to the Wichita City Council, he served from 1989 to 1992, including two one-year terms as Vice Mayor.

Gooch was elected to the Kansas Senate in 1992 as a Democrat, serving from 1993 until 2004, representing the 29th Kansas Senate District—an inner-city area in central-northeast Wichita.

The 2013 Kansas Senate Resolution honoring him reported that:

His committee assignments have included service as ranking minority member of the Federal and State Affairs and Transportation Committees plus membership on the Elections and Local Government, Administrative Rules and Regulations, Local Government, Commerce, Economic Development and Governmental Organization Committees. He also served on the Joint Committee on Rules and Regulations and the Joint Committee on Economic Development...

In 2003, citing frustrations with the lack of progress in the shortest Kansas legislative session in decades, Gooch retired from the Kansas Senate, a few months from turning 80 years of age, as the oldest serving Kansas senator. He was succeeded by State Representative Donald Betts (D-Wichita).

Gooch successfully urged his daughter Bonita Gooch to assume leadership of Wichita's leading black newspaper, The Community Voice, which she subsequently operated for decades.

Gooch's grandson, Kerry Gooch, served as Executive Director of the Kansas Democratic Party from 2015 to 2017.

== Retirement and death ==
In 2006, with journalist Glen Sharp (New York Times, Newsweek), Gooch self-published his autobiography: Black Horizons: One Aviator's Experience in the Post-Tuskeegee Era,

In 2008, Gooch was the subject of a documentary film, From the Bottom.

In 2009, the Federal Aviation Administration presented Gooch with the Wright Brothers Master Pilot Award. for a half-century or more of piloting and aircraft operations.

In 2012, he was presented with the 2012 Trailblazers Award from the Kansas African American Museum in Wichita.

In 2013, as he approached age 90, the Kansas Senate issued Senate Resolution No.1770: A Resolution congratulating and commending Senator Ulysses Lee "Rip" Gooch, and Gooch, with friends and supporters, organized a 90th birthday party for him that drew hundreds to a local theater.

In May, 2014, he was elected Sergeant at Arms of the Jayhawk Chapter (Kansas) of the Black Pilots Association.

Gooch died on November 24, 2021, at the age of 98.

In May 2023, the Kansas Aviation Museum, of which Gooch had been a board member, posthumously established the Rip Gooch Black Aviators Exhibit, showcasing Kansas-connected black aviators, including Gooch and Tuskeegee Airmen George Boyd and Dr. Don Jackson, among others.
