= Kansas's 29th Senate district =

American legislative district

Kansas's 29th State Senate district
Senator
Oletha Faust-Goudeau; D–Wichita
- Demographics: 38% White; 28% Black; 26% Hispanic; 4% Asian; 1% Native American; 3% Other
- Population (2018): 68,225

Kansas's 29th Senate district is one of 40 districts in the Kansas Senate. It has been represented by Democrat Oletha Faust-Goudeau since 2009.

== Geography ==
District 29 is based in northern and downtown Wichita in Sedgwick County, covering many of the city's most diverse neighborhoods.

The district is located entirely within Kansas's 4th congressional district, and overlaps with the 83rd, 84th, 86th, 89th, 91st, 92nd, and 103rd districts of the Kansas House of Representatives.

== Recent election results ==
=== 2020 ===
2020 Kansas Senate election, District 29
Party	Candidate	Votes	%
Democratic	Oletha Faust-Goudeau (incumbent)	15,253	71.1
Republican	Myron Ackerman	6,199	28.9
Total votes		21,452	100
Democratic hold			

=== 2016 ===
2016 Kansas Senate election, District 29
Party	Candidate	Votes	%
Democratic	Oletha Faust-Goudeau (incumbent)	14,511	100
Total votes		14,511	100
Democratic hold			

=== 2012 ===
2012 Kansas Senate election, District 29
Primary election
Party	Candidate	Votes	%
Democratic	Oletha Faust-Goudeau (incumbent)	2,103	78.4
Democratic	KC Ohaebosim	579	21.6
Total votes		2,682	100
General election
Democratic	Oletha Faust-Goudeau (incumbent)	11,720	63.7
Republican	Kenya Cox	5,570	30.3
Libertarian	Carl Kramer	1,120	6.1
Total votes		18,410	100
Democratic hold			

=== Federal and statewide results ===
Year	Office	Results
2020	President	Biden 69.3 – 28.3%
2018	Governor	Kelly 71.5 – 20.9%
2016	President	Clinton 65.0 – 28.2%
2012	President	Obama 68.6 – 29.2%
