= Marco Rubio 2016 presidential campaign =

Political campaign for United States presidency

Marco Rubio for President
- Campaign: 2016 Republican Party presidential primaries
- Candidate: Marco Rubio; United States Senator from Florida (2011–2025)
- Affiliation: Republican Party
- Status: Announced: April 13, 2015; Suspended: March 15, 2016
- Headquarters: P.O. Box 558701; Miami, Florida, U.S.
- Key people: Terry Sullivan (Campaign Manager), Alex Conant (Communications Director)
- Receipts: US$51,747,005 (2016-6-30)
- Slogan: A New American Century
- Chant: Mar-co!

Website
- www.marcorubio.com (archived - March 14, 2016)

Marco Rubio, then the junior United States senator from Florida, formally announced his 2016 presidential campaign on April 13, 2015, at the Freedom Tower in Downtown Miami. Early polling showed Rubio, who was considered a potential candidate for vice president by Republican presidential nominee Mitt Romney in 2012, as a frontrunner candidate for the Republican nomination for president of the United States in 2016 since at least the end of the 2012 election. Rubio was the second Cuban American to run for president, with Republican Ted Cruz announcing his campaign three weeks earlier. He suspended his campaign on March 15, 2016, after finishing second in Florida's primary.

Later that year, Rubio was re-elected as a United States Senator from Florida on a second term. The Republican nominee, Donald Trump, was elected president in the presidential election. Eight years later, after Trump's re-election to a non-consecutive term, he nominated Rubio as Secretary of State.

== Background ==
=== 2012 presidential election ===
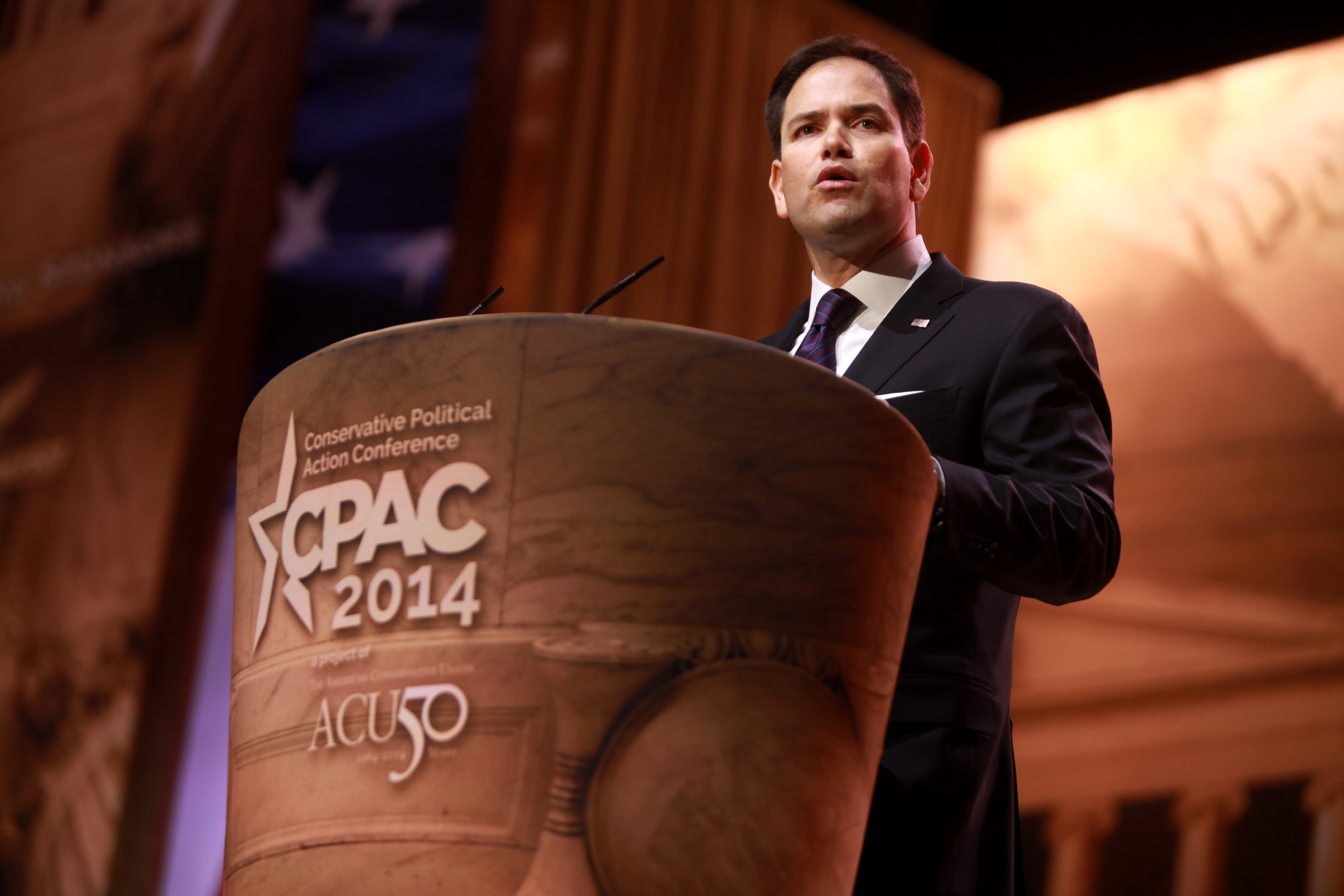
Rubio speaking at the 2014 Conservative Political Action Conference

As early as January 2011, there had been speculation that he might seek the office of the president or vice-president. In January 2011, Rubio stated he had no interest in being the vice-presidential candidate in the 2012 presidential election. Despite his comments, speculation continued that presidential candidate Mitt Romney might select Rubio as his running mate. According to the book Double Down, Romney's campaign narrowed down his list of potential nominees for vice president to five candidates, one of which was Rubio. However, Romney ultimately picked Wisconsin congressman Paul Ryan.

=== 2016 presidential election ===
Throughout 2014, groups had been raising money to support a potential Rubio presidential campaign. Groups supporting Rubio raised over $530,000 in the first three months of 2014, most of which was spent on consultants and data analytics, in what was seen as preparations for a presidential campaign.

Early polling data showed Rubio as a frontrunner for the nomination shortly after the 2012 election. From late 2012 to mid-2013, Rubio came in first in eight consecutive national polls among potential 2016 candidates, from such sources as Public Policy Polling, Harper Polling, Quinnipiac University, and Fairleigh Dickinson University. In statewide polls, he had performed most prominently in his home state of Florida, alongside Jeb Bush, and has also performed fairly well in Suffolk University polls in such states as Colorado, Michigan, and Minnesota. A poll from the WMUR/University, tracking New Hampshire Republican primary voters' sentiment, showed Rubio at the top alongside Kentucky senator Rand Paul in March 2013. However, he had dropped to 10th place behind other Republican contenders by April 2014. The poll, however, also suggested that Rubio was not disliked by primary voters, which could have been positive for him had other candidates chosen not to run. By the time of Rubio's announcement, he had regained some standing in the polls. A March 2015 NBC/Wall Street Journal poll asked Republican Party voters if they could see themselves supporting the various candidates. Rubio won the poll with 56 percent of Republican voters saying they could see themselves supporting Rubio, while only 26 percent said they could not. Wisconsin governor Scott Walker and former Arkansas governor Mike Huckabee trailed just behind Rubio with 53 and 52 percent, respectively. A CNN/ORC poll conducted from March 13 to March 15, 2015, found that Rubio was tied with Chris Christie for the Republican nomination.

In January 2015, Rubio began laying the foundation for a presidential campaign. He began contacting top donors and appointed advisors, including George Seay, who previously worked on Rick Perry's 2012 presidential campaign and Mitt Romney's 2008 presidential campaign, and Jim Rubright, who had previously worked for Jeb Bush, Romney, and John McCain. Rubio also instructed his aides to "prepare for a presidential campaign" prior to a Team Marco 2016 fundraising meeting in South Beach.

== Campaign ==
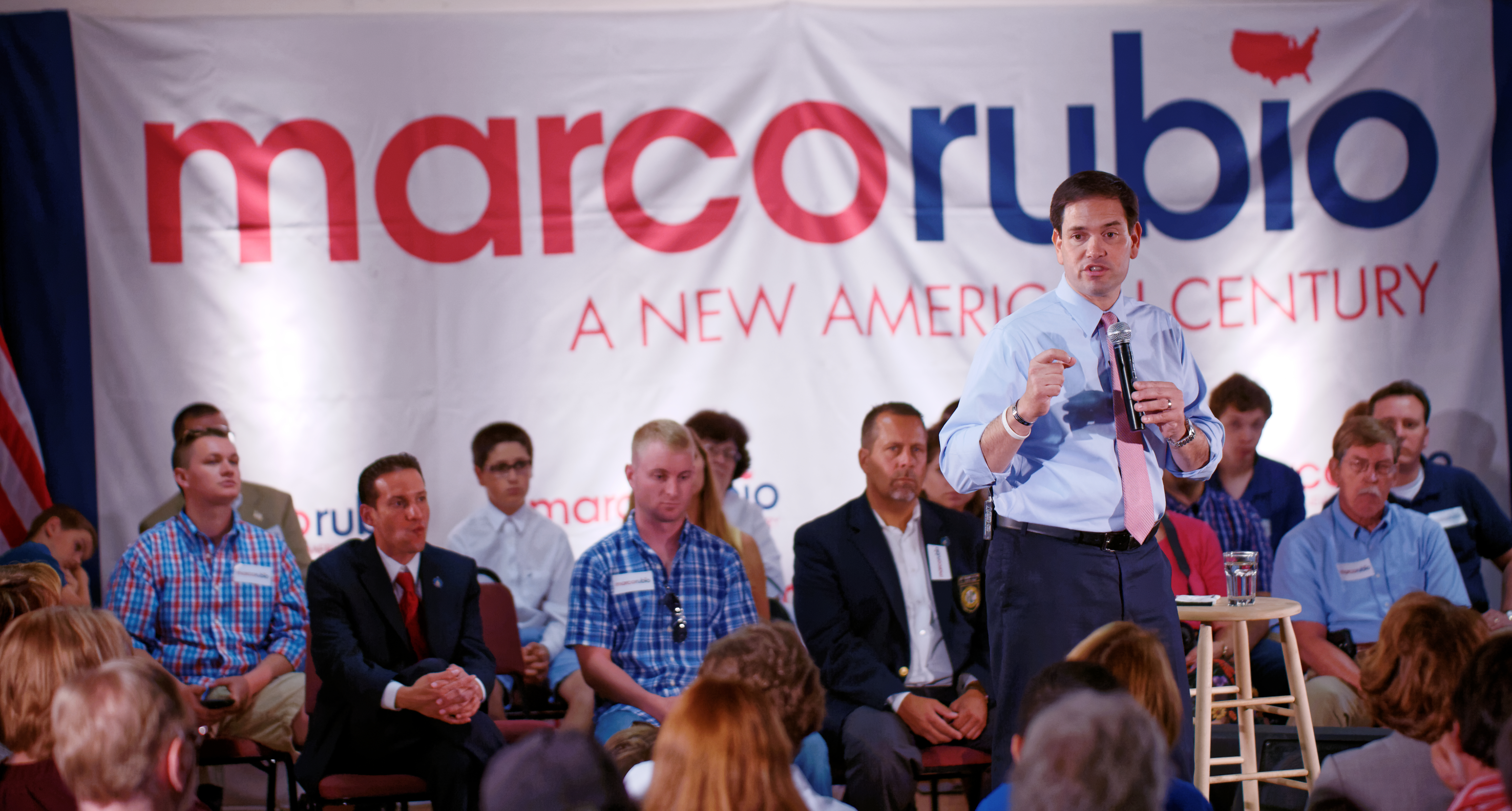
Rubio speaking to voters in Salem, New Hampshire in June 2015

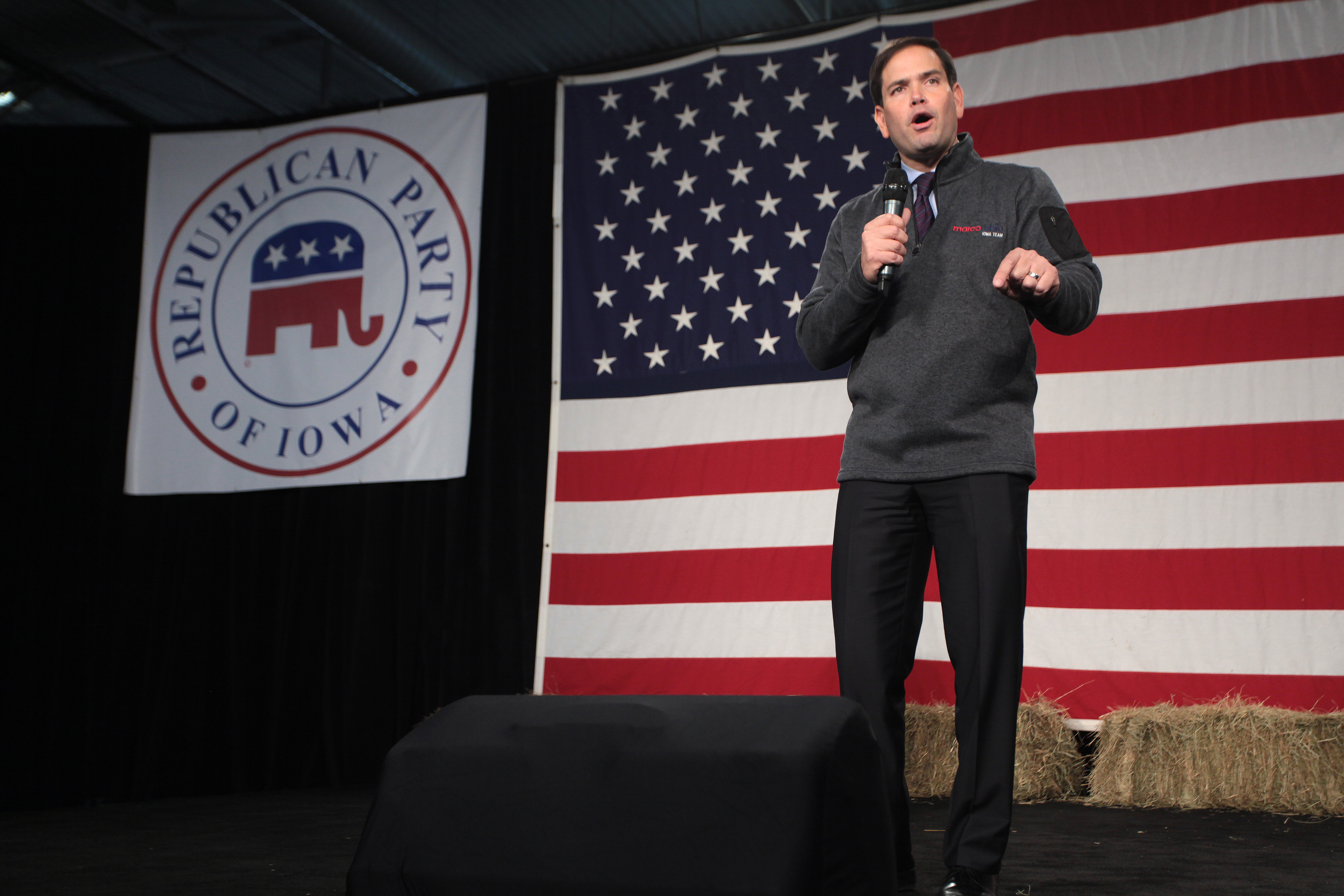
Rubio speaking at an event hosted by the Iowa Republican Party in October 2015

On March 30, 2015, Rubio announced on Fox News and through social media that he would be making a "big announcement" on April 13 in Miami, Florida. While he did not specify whether the announcement pertained to his reelection as a U.S. senator or for the Presidency, most media consensus was that Rubio would be announcing his presidential run. He made the announcement at the Freedom Tower in Downtown Miami. In his announcement speech, Rubio cast himself as forward-looking and a leader for a new generation of Americans, in contrast to Democrat Hillary Clinton, who announced her presidential campaign the day before; in addition, he announced he would not seek re-election as senator. With the announcement, Rubio became the fourth major candidate to officially announce a run after Republicans (and fellow senators) Ted Cruz of Texas and Rand Paul of Kentucky and Democrat Hillary Clinton.

Although Rubio initially struggled to poll as well as other frontrunners such as Chris Christie, Jeb Bush, Scott Walker, and Donald Trump, Rubio's performance in the debates was widely seen as a boosting factor in his rising poll numbers in the late summer and fall of 2015. Over the course of both of the first two debates, in August and September, Rubio was widely praised as one of the top performers, even being called the winner by some analysts. As a result, Rubio's poll numbers began to increase once more, and he eventually reached the #3 position in most polling averages, only behind Trump and Ben Carson. Another factor that was seen as greatly improving Rubio's chances was the exit from the race of Scott Walker on September 21. Analysts claimed that many of Walker's supporters and donors were turning to him as a viable alternative to Bush, who could also claim broad appeal to both moderates and conservatives. With Walker out of the race, Rubio was widely viewed as the next likeliest candidate who best matched this criterion. The Rubio campaign was even reported as hiring up to nine of Walker's former top staffers less than 24 hours after his exit.

Matt Lewis has commented that, "Democrats should fear Marco Rubio", who Lewis saw as "heralding a generational shift" for Republicans. Rubio, along with Paul Ryan and his recent ascension to the House speakership, Lewis says, means "both men will be attacked for their youth and energy", adding: "But it's hard to look at this strong and diverse Republican bench, and not juxtapose it to the Democrats, whose party – now that Barack Obama is a lame duck – seems to be represented by a bunch of old white people, such as Hillary Clinton, 68, Bernie Sanders, the 74-year-old democratic socialist candidate, ...Nancy Pelosi, 75, and Harry Reid, 75... For Democrats, who were hoping they would get to deal with old pols like John Boehner and Jeb Bush...the world just got a little bit scarier".

The November 2015 Paris attacks were widely seen as altering the narrative of the 2016 presidential primaries, and in particular gave a boost to Rubio for his foreign policy stances, in comparison to such candidates who were softer on foreign policy such as Carson, and also for his having political experience, in contrast to other front-runners such as Trump.

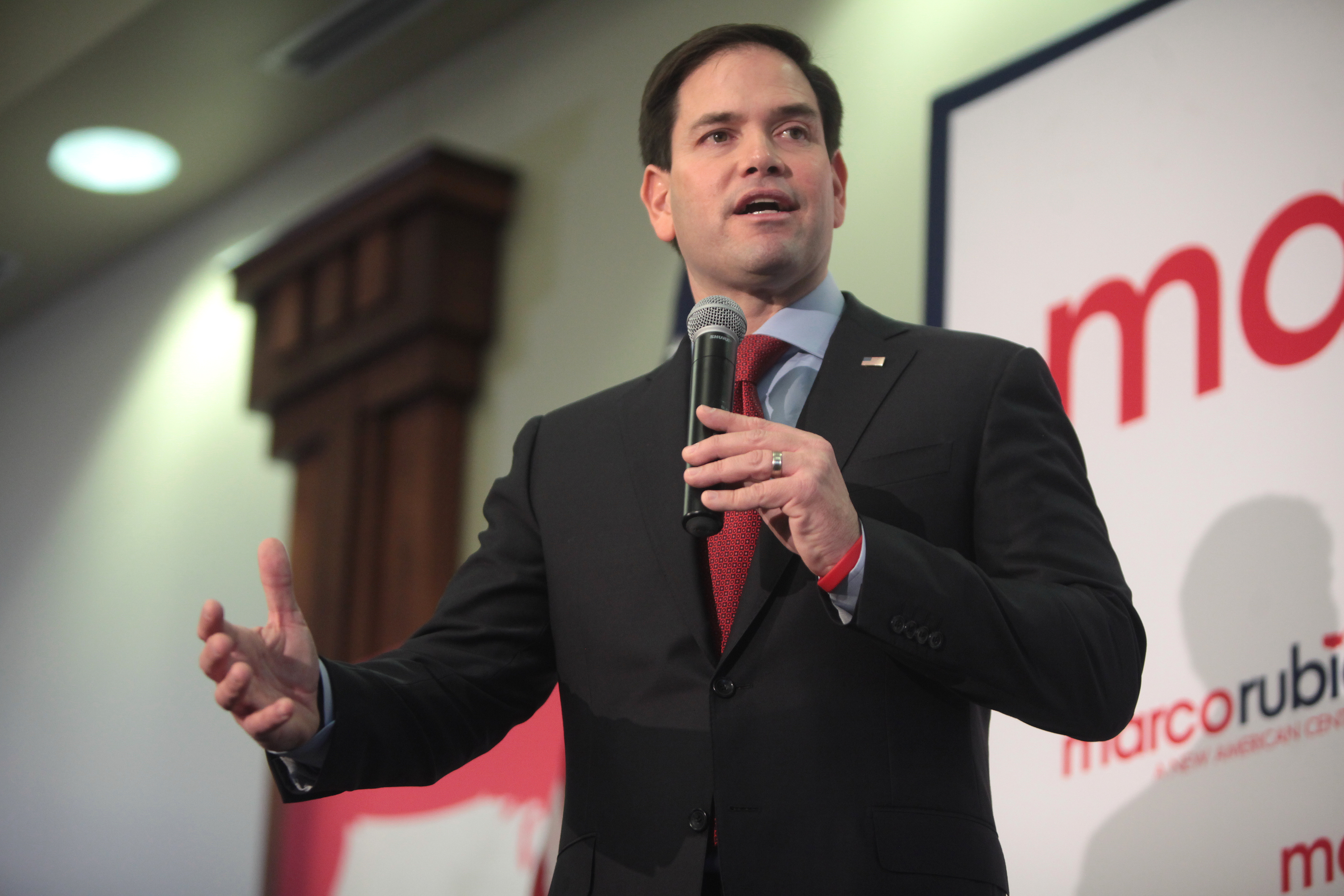
Rubio speaking with supporters at a campaign rally featuring U.S. senator Joni Ernst at the Forte Banquet Center in Des Moines, Iowa in January 2016

During the latter part of 2015, Rubio's voting record in the senate came under scrutiny. Jeb Bush, during the CNBC debate on October 28, told Rubio that he could either campaign or resign, Rubio responding that Bush had not made similar comments about the voting record of John McCain during his 2008 presidential campaign and concluded that Bush was only criticizing "because we're running for the same position and someone has convinced you that attacking me is going to help you." In December, while in Iowa, fellow presidential candidate Chris Christie mentioned Rubio missing a vote on a national spending bill the senator opposed and added, "Just show up to work and vote no, and like if you don't want to, then quit." On December 29, Rubio responded to Christie by claiming to have close to a 90% attendance record while also retorting that the governor had "been missing in New Jersey half of the time." In late December, Right to Rise, a Jeb Bush super PAC, released an ad claiming that Rubio had both missed a classified meeting the previous month after the Paris attacks and "missed more total votes than any other senator". On January 7, Rubio defended his record by arguing that votes were "precooked" and votes were used to "make a statement."

Rubio participated in the January 28 Fox News debate, charging Cruz with building his campaign on "the lie" stemming from his stance on immigration and insisting in Jeb Bush's book Immigration Wars: Forging an American Solution that the latter changed his "position on immigration". January 29, during an interview the following day, Rubio was confident about his chances in Iowa, though did not deny that Ted Cruz was the frontrunner since by Rubio's admission, "He's spent basically all of his money in Iowa."

=== Early primaries ===
Rubio finished in third place in the Iowa caucus on February 1. Though polling had shown him in third place prior to the caucus, the result was still treated as a surprisingly strong showing. Amber Phillips of The Washington Post wrote of Rubio's performance, "He over-performed expectations, and for that, Rubio perhaps almost as much as Cruz can call Monday a win." After being projected in third place, Rubio said in a speech that he had defied expectations and swore that when he was the nominee of the election cycle, "we are going to unify this party, and we are going to unify the conservative movement". A little over a week after the primary, on February 10, Rubio accused Cruz of having misled voters through claiming fellow candidate Ben Carson would be ending his campaign in what he called "a concerted effort that I'm sure they planned to execute on something in order to influence the election."

Going into New Hampshire, Rubio by February 5, four days after the Iowa victory, was polling at an average of 16%. This placed him in second place, behind Trump. At the New Hampshire debate on February 6, 2016, Rubio was criticized by Christie for repeating memorized speeches, to which Rubio replied by repeating four times a statement to the effect that President Obama was destroying America. Rubio defended these remarks the following day, saying with respect to the statement that Obama "knows exactly what he's doing" that "It's what I believe and it's what I'm going to continue to say, because it happens to be one of the main reasons why I am running." Rubio came in fifth place during the New Hampshire primary on February 9. Shortly afterward, Rubio admitted to supporters that he was disappointed and concluded that his debate performance three days prior had not helped him in the state. Chris Christie, who came in sixth place behind Rubio, dropped out the following day. Rubio responded to his ended candidacy by praising him.

Campaigning in South Carolina on February 11, Rubio charged Trump and Bush with having no foreign policy experience and acknowledged John Kasich as experienced in that regard, but not having been involved with foreign policy "in a long time." Rubio participated in the February 13 CBS News debate, exchanging with Cruz over the latter's claim regarding Rubio's comments in Spanish during an appearance on Univision. Rubio responded by claiming that Cruz did not know how to speak Spanish, Cruz retorting through speaking the language. The following day, February 14, Rubio denied that he was attempting to call into question Cruz's legitimacy as a Latino, instead having meant to question if he understood him and, he added, regarding Cruz, "He's just going off what other people are telling him, and it's false. It's just not true." On February 17, Governor of South Carolina Nikki Haley endorsed Rubio. Haley's endorsement was seen as helpful to Rubio, exit polls after the primary having one in four voters indicate that they had supported Rubio only after the governor's endorsement. In the South Carolina primary on February 20, Rubio finished in second place at 22%, but won zero delegates from the state. Jeb Bush came in fourth place and then suspended his campaign. In his speech afterward, Rubio said the primary had "become a three person race, and we will win the nomination".

The next voting state, Nevada, was seen as one that Rubio could potentially claim as his first victory due to the outpouring of support from the Republican Party. Some commentators observed Rubio having spent six years of his childhood in the state as a potential advantage over the other candidates in appealing to voters. Rubio acknowledged his roots within the state, but believed that he was similar to the other candidates in having to "compete hard" for a victory. A poll was released on February 17 showing Rubio in second place at 19%, twenty-six points behind Trump who was at 45%. Nevada lieutenant governor Mark Hutchison publicly expressed confidence in Rubio's chances, as did the candidate himself. However, on February 23, the day of the primary, Rubio finished in second place, behind Trump. The victory widened Trump's lead over the others, leading to a belief that he was going to become the nominee regardless of the results of Super Tuesday. Following the second-place finish, aides of Rubio said he would only win if supporters of both Kasich, who was still running despite poor performances in nearly every one of the four states, and Bush coalesced behind him.

Rubio participated in the CNN debate on February 25, having heated exchanges with front-runner Donald Trump. On February 26, Rubio followed up on his performance the previous day at a rally in Dallas by mocking Trump's misspelled tweets and suggested Trump's "pants were wet". Rubio made further comments about Trump which included remarks denouncing his privileged background as having made him unfamiliar with financial difficulties and his physical appearance. Weeks later, Rubio regretted mocking Trump in this manner, stating that his "kids were embarrassed by it".

=== Super Tuesday; March contests ===
Leading up to Super Tuesday, there were mixed reactions to how well Rubio would perform. The following day, Rubio withdrew from planned appearances in Kentucky and Louisiana that were scheduled in the latter part of the week, leading to speculation that the move was the result of a lack of confidence the Rubio campaign had in its chances to win the two states, polling at the time showing Trump in first place.

On March 6, Rubio had won the Puerto Rico Republican primary by a large margin, pulling in 71.02% of the vote. He took all twenty-three delegates. Rubio previously addressed Puerto Rico during a CNN debate, arguing that its problems stemmed from an economy that was not growing and that it was "too expensive to do business there." He also blamed Puerto Rico governor Alejandro García Padilla for not cutting government spending, Padilla afterward charging him with being employed by the "vultures that fund his campaign." For the March 8 contests offering over 140 delegates, Rubio won one delegate from Hawaii and zero delegates from three other states: Idaho, Michigan and Mississippi. He was third in Hawaii and Idaho, but ranked fourth in Michigan and Mississippi with less than 10% of the vote. This left him with a total of 152 delegates compared to Trump's 459 and Cruz's 360; so Rubio would still be behind even if he won Florida's 99 delegates. Also on that day, the Cruz campaign distributed an email indicating that Rubio was being advised to drop out, Rubio responding to the charge denying that he was withdrawing from the race, and his spokesman concluded that Cruz was "up to his dirty tricks again spreading false rumors and lies."

=== Florida loss; suspension ===
In early March 2016, there became a consensus that Rubio would have to win his home state to remain a credible candidate in the race, political science professor Stephen Craig saying the senator would be "dead meat" if he did not win Florida and further questioned if even a victory would be enough to sustain his campaign. Rubio expressed confidence that he would win Florida. Rubio's campaign was reported to be aiming for Ohio voters to support Kasich over him to beat Trump, while in contrast describing Rubio as the only candidate able to beat Trump in Florida. On March 11, CNN averaged six March polls for Florida and found that Rubio was scoring 26% support, less than Trump's 40%. Rubio's last rally, the night before the results, was at Palm Beach Atlantic University in West Palm Beach, FL, just miles from Donald Trump's Mar-a-Lago, where he spoke optimistically of the next day ahead. On the day of the Florida primary, Rubio said that his campaign would continue to Utah regardless of the results and charged the polls, all of which showing him behind Trump, as being "out of control."

On March 15, 2016, Rubio suspended his campaign, when he finished second in the primary of his home state of Florida held that day. Rubio won in only 1 (Miami-Dade) of Florida's 67 counties, and his Florida vote share was 27.0%; Trump won 45.7% and all of Florida's delegates. The conclusion of the six March 15 contests (out of which Rubio won none) left Rubio with 169 delegates on the race to reach 1237, but Ted Cruz already had 411 and Trump 673.

== Fundraising ==
A Super PAC in support of Rubio, Conservative Solutions PAC, was launched in the beginning of April 2015. It is led by Warren Tompkins. Miami businessman Norman Braman was named by political commentators as a probable large donor.

Rubio raised about $1.25 million online the day after his announcement. By the three-month mark of his campaign – July 13 – Rubio had raised over $12 million. Between July and September, Rubio acquired $5.7 million for the campaign, noted by ABC News as being less than the garnered finances of rivals Ted Cruz, Carly Fiorina and Ben Carson, the latter having triple of Rubio's total. By Christmas Rubio raised a total of $47,713,472. It was reported in January that Rubio was canceling a fundraiser to attend a senate meeting, one reportedly having to do with the current affairs of North Korea. That month, Rubio raised roughly $5 million. On March 16, the day after Rubio announced the suspension of his campaign, he met with donors, summarizing the end of the campaign, "We had a great season but we didn't get to the Super Bowl and we didn't win the Super Bowl".

== Endorsements ==
U.S. Governors (current and former)

- Robert List, Nevada (former) (previously endorsed Scott Walker)
- George Pataki, New York (former); 2016 presidential candidate
- Bobby Jindal, Louisiana (former); 2016 presidential candidate
- Tim Pawlenty, Minnesota (former); 2012 Presidential Candidate
- George Allen, Virginia (former Governor and Senator)
- Scott McCallum, Wisconsin (former)
- Craig Benson, New Hampshire (former)
- Sam Brownback, Kansas
- Nikki Haley, South Carolina
- Asa Hutchinson, Arkansas (previously endorsed Mike Huckabee)
- Luis Fortuño, Puerto Rico (former)
- Frank Keating, Oklahoma (former)
- Bill Haslam, Tennessee
- Susana Martinez, New Mexico

U.S. Senators (current and former)

- Arizona: Jon Kyl (former) and Jeff Flake
- Arkansas: Tim Hutchinson (former)
- Colorado: Cory Gardner
- Florida: Connie Mack III (former) and Mel Martínez (former)
- Idaho: Jim Risch
- Indiana: Dan Coats
- Kansas: Pat Roberts, Bob Dole (former, 1996 presidential nominee) (previously endorsed Jeb Bush)
- Kentucky: Jim Bunning (former)
- Minnesota: Norm Coleman (former) (previously endorsed Lindsey Graham, and then Jeb Bush) and Rudy Boschwitz (former)
- Missouri: Kit Bond (former)
- Montana: Steve Daines
- Nebraska: Deb Fischer
- Nevada: Dean Heller
- North Carolina: Thom Tillis
- Oklahoma: Jim Inhofe and Tom Coburn (former)
- Pennsylvania: Pat Toomey, Rick Santorum (former) (also former 2016 presidential candidate)
- South Carolina: Tim Scott
- Tennessee: Bill Frist (former) and Lamar Alexander
- Texas: Phil Gramm (former)
- Utah: Orrin Hatch (previously endorsed Jeb Bush)

U.S. Representatives (current and former)

- Arizona: Matt Salmon
- Arkansas: Rick Crawford and Steve Womack
- California: Doug LaMalfa, Darrell Issa and Mimi Walters
- Colorado: Mike Coffman
- Florida: Tom Rooney, Ileana Ros-Lehtinen, Mario Díaz-Balart, Carlos Curbelo, Lincoln Díaz-Balart (former), Jeff Miller, Gus Bilirakis, Ander Crenshaw and Tom Feeney (former)
- Georgia: Austin Scott, Lynn Westmoreland and Tom Graves
- Illinois: Darin LaHood, Rodney Davis and Adam Kinzinger (previously endorsed Jeb Bush)
- Indiana: Todd Rokita, Larry Bucshon and Chris Chocola (former)
- Kansas: Mike Pompeo
- Kentucky: Anne Northup (former) and Geoff Davis (former)
- Michigan: John Moolenaar, Bill Huizenga, and Dan Benishek
- Minnesota: John Kline and Erik Paulsen
- Mississippi: Chip Pickering (former)
- Missouri: Jason T. Smith
- Nevada: Mark Amodei and Cresent Hardy
- New York: Peter T. King
- North Carolina: Robert Pittenger, Robin Hayes (former)
- Oklahoma: Markwayne Mullin and Steve Largent (former)
- Pennsylvania: Glenn Thompson
- South Carolina: Trey Gowdy, Gresham Barrett (former), and Joe Wilson
- South Dakota: Kristi Noem
- Tennessee: Zach Wamp (former) and Phil Roe
- Texas: Quico Canseco (former)
- Utah: (Whole House Delegation) Chris Stewart, Mia Love Rob Bishop, and Jason Chaffetz
- Virginia: Scott Rigell and Barbara Comstock
- Washington: Jaime Herrera Beutler
- Wisconsin: Sean Duffy (previously endorsed Scott Walker) and Reid Ribble

U.S. Ambassadors (former)

- Skip Vallee, former Ambassador to Slovakia (2005–2007)
- Victor Ashe, former Ambassador to Poland (2004–2009) and former Bush supporter
- Francis Rooney, former Ambassador to the Holy See (2005–2008)
- Michael Retzer, former Ambassador to Tanzania (2005–2007)

Republican National Committee members (current)

- Bill Armistead, chair of Alabama GOP (2011–2015)
- Jerry Labriola Jr., chair of Connecticut GOP (2011–2015).

Republican National Committee members (former)

- Alec Poitevint, former Georgia GOP chair
- John McCarthy, former Kentucky GOP chair
- Charlie Webster, former Maine GOP chair
- Robert Maginn, chair of Massachusetts GOP (2011–2013)
- Andrew Natsios, former Massachusetts GOP chair
- Arnie Hederman, chairman of the Mississippi GOP (2011–2012)
- Jim Herring, former Mississippi GOP chair
- Ferrell Blount, former NCGOP chairman
- Stan Lockhart, former Utah GOP chair

Statewide officials

- Arizona: Mark Brnovich (AG of AZ)
- Arkansas: Gregory Bledsoe (Arkansas Surgeon General), Tim Griffin (LG of AR)
- Florida: Carlos López-Cantera (LG of FL), Jeff Atwater (Chief Financial Officer of Florida), Adam Putnam (Florida Commissioner of Agriculture), Bobby Brantley (former LG of FL), Tom Gallagher (former Chief Financial Officer of Florida), Bill McCollum (AG of FL) and Sandra Mortham (former Secretary of State of Florida)
- Hawaii: Duke Aiona (former LG of HI)
- Idaho: Brandon D. Woolf (Contr. of ID)
- Kansas: Ron Estes (Kansas State Treasurer) and Nick Jordan (Kansas Secretary of Revenue)
- Massachusetts: Kerry Healey (former LG of MA)
- Two from Nevada: Mark Hutchison (LG of NV), Lorraine Hunt (former LG of NV).
- New Hampshire: Peter Heed (former AG of NH)
- Ohio: Josh Mandel (Treas. of OH).
- Oklahoma: Ken A. Miller (Treas. of OK), Jim Reese (Oklahoma Secretary of Agriculture) and Chris Benge (Oklahoma Secretary of State)
- Texas: Susan Combs (former Texas Comptroller of Public Accounts, former Texas Agriculture Commissioner and former Texas State Representative), Jerry E. Patterson (former Texas Land Commissioner and former Texas State Senator), Esperanza Andrade (former Secretary of State of Texas) and Gwyn Shea (former Secretary of State of Texas)
- Utah: Spencer Cox (LG of UT)
- Vermont: Brian Dubie (former LG of VT), Phil Scott (LG of VT) and Randy Brock (former Vermont Auditor of Accounts)
- Virginia: Jerry Kilgore (former AG of VA) and Bill Bolling (former LG of VA)
- Wisconsin: Margaret Farrow (former LG of WI)

State legislators

- Six Alabama State Senators: Clay Scofield, Slade Blackwell, Greg Albritton, Greg Reed (Majority Leader), Steve Livingston, J. T. Waggoner
- Twenty-six Alabama State Representatives: Will Ainsworth, Randall Shedd, Danny Garrett, David Faulkner, Jack Williams, Jim Patterson, K. L. Brown, Kyle South, Mack Butler, Matt Fridy, Mike Jones Jr., Nathaniel Ledbetter, Lynn Greer, Mike Ball, Paul Beckman, Chris Blackshear, DuWayne Bridges Sr., Terri Collins, Danny Crawford, Jim Hill, Mike Hill, Jimmy Martin, Bill Poole, David Sessions, Harry Shiver, Jack W. Williams
- Seven Arkansas State Senators: Bart Hester, Jonathan Dismang (President), Jim Hendren (Majority Leader), Missy Irvin, Greg Standridge, John Cooper, Jeremy Hutchinson
- Twenty-one Arkansas State Representatives: Ken Bragg (Majority Leader), Jim Dotson (Majority Whip), Justin Boyd, Lanny Fite, Charlie Collins, DeAnn Vaught, Laurie Rushing, Nate Bell, Jana Della Rosa, Mark Lowery, Micah Neal, Prissy Hickerson, Kenneth Henderson, Dan Douglas, Mickey Gates, Charlene Fite, Karilyn Brown, David Meeks, Andy Davis, Grant Hodges, Gary Deffenbaugh
- Four California State Senators: Jim Nielsen, Jeff Stone, Andy Vidak, Patricia Bates
- Two Members of the California State Assembly: Scott Wilk, Kristin Olsen (former Minority Leader)
- Colorado State Senator: Josh Penry (former Minority Leader)
- Colorado State Representative: B.J. Nikkel (former Majority Whip)
- Delaware State Senator: Gregory Lavelle (Minority Whip)
- Sixty-six Florida State Representatives: Adam Hasner (former Majority Leader), Esteban Bovo (former), Keith Perry, Dane Eagle, Lake Ray, Ross Spano, Debbie Mayfield, Matt Caldwell, Bryan Avila, Jeanette Núñez, Mike Miller, Rene Plasencia, Mike La Rosa, Ray Pilon, Scott Plakon, Julio Gonzalez, Danny Burgess, Shawn Harrison, Dean Cannon (former Speaker) Larry Cretul (former Speaker), Allan Bense (former Speaker), Johnnie Byrd (former Speaker), Steve Crisafulli (Speaker), Richard Corcoran (Speaker-designate), Dana Young (Majority Leader), Dennis K. Baxley, Jason Brodeur, Colleen Burton, Bob Cortes, Fred Costello, Eric Eisnaugle, Cary Pigman, Charlie Stone, Jennifer Sullivan, John Wood, Ritch Workman, Travis Cummings, Charles McBurney, Elizabeth W. Porter, Cyndi Stevenson, Bill Hager, Gayle Harrell, MaryLynn Magar, Patrick Rooney Jr., Doug Broxson, Brad Drake, Clay Ingram, Frank Artiles, Michael Bileca, José Félix Díaz, Manny Díaz Jr., Erik Fresen, George Moraitis, José R. Oliva, Holly Merrill Raschein, Jim Boyd, J. W. Grant, Chris Latvala, Jake Raburn, Dan Raulerson, Ray Rodrigues, Jimmie Todd Smith, Chris Sprowls, Heather Fitzenhagen, Ken Roberson, Janet Adkins
- Fourteen Florida State Senators: Miguel Díaz de la Portilla, René García, Thad Altman, Denise Grimsley, David Simmons, Kelli Stargel, Aaron Bean, Travis Hutson, Anitere Flores, Jeff Brandes, Nancy Detert, Jack Latvala, Tom Lee, Garrett Richter
- Six Georgia State Senators: P. K. Martin IV, Judson Hill, Chuck Clay (former), Rick Jeffares, Dean Burke, Tommie Williams (President Pro Tempore)
- Twenty-three Georgia State Representatives: Geoff Duncan, Chuck Efstration, Buzz Brockway, Trey Kelley, Bert Reeves, Matt Ramsey (House Majority Whip), Bill Werkheiser, Michael Ryan Caldwell, Brian Strickland, Mike Dudgeon, Gerald Greene, Howard Maxwell, Sharon Cooper, John Corbett, Robert Dickey, Barry Fleming, Bob Irvin (former House Republican Leader), Chuck Martin, Randy Nix, Jesse Petrea, Tom Rice, Jason Shaw, Ron Stephens
- Two Hawaii State Representatives: Richard Fale (former), Barbara Marumoto (former)
- Illinois State Senator: Michael Connelly
- Indiana State Senator: Carlin Yoder
- Five Indiana State Representatives: Cindy Ziemke, David Ober (Assistant Majority Leader), David Ober, Casey Cox, Holli Sullivan
- Five Iowa State Senators: Rick Bertrand, Jack Whitver., Dan Zumbach, Tom Shipley, Larry McKibben (former)
- Seven Iowa State Representatives: Bobby Kaufmann, Brian Best, John Wills, Megan Jones, Carmine Boal (former), Dawn Pettengill, Quentin Stanerson
- Seven Kansas State Senators: Terry Bruce (Majority Leader), Dan Kerschen, Garrett Love, Nancey Harrington (former), Chris Steineger (former), Dennis Wilson (former), Julia Lynn
- Eighteen Kansas State Representatives: Erin Davis, Steven Anthimides, Mario Goico, Daniel Hawkins, Kyle Hoffman, Mark Hutton, Jim Kelly, Jerry Lunn, Les Mason, Ron Ryckman Sr., Chuck Smith, James Todd, Troy Waymaster, John Whitmer, Kristey Williams, Jason Watkins (former), John Ewy, Ken Rahjes
- Six Kentucky State Senators: Julie Adams, Ralph Alvarado, C. B. Embry, Paul Hornback, Richie Sanders (former), Kenneth W. Winters (former)
- Twenty Kentucky State Representatives: Jeff Hoover (Minority Leader), Robert Benvenuti, Kevin Bratcher, Regina Bunch, John "Bam" Carney, Jim DeCesare, Jim DuPlessis, Richard Heath, Tom Kerr, Brian Linder, Donna Mayfield, David Meade, Michael Meredith, Jerry T. Miller, Tim Moore, David Osborne, Bart Rowland, Sal Santoro, James A. Tipton, Addia Wuchner
- Three Louisiana State Senators: Bodi White, Mike Walsworth, Ronnie Johns
- Two Louisiana State Representatives: Steve Carter, Kirk Talbot
- Four Maine State Senators: Kevin Raye (former President), Amy Volk, Ronald F. Collins, Brian Langley
- Eighteen Maine State Representatives: Kenneth Fredette (Minority Leader), Robert Nutting (former Speaker), Joshua Tardy (former Minority Leader), Bruce Bickford, Jim Donnelly (former Minority Leader), Anthony Edgecomb, Robert Foley, Karen Gerrish, Phyllis Ginzler, Matthew Harrington, L. Gary Knight (former), Joyce Maker, Richard Malaby, Dwayne Prescott, William Tuell, Karen Vachon, Nathan Wadsworth, Dustin White
- Maryland State Senator: Justin Ready
- Eight Maryland State Delegates: Christian Miele, John W. E. Cluster Jr., Herbert H. McMillan, Jason C. Buckel, Robert Flanagan, Susan W. Krebs, Kevin Hornberger, Haven Shoemaker
- Five Massachusetts State Senators: Richard J. Ross, Vinny deMacedo, Ryan Fattman, Donald Humason Jr., Richard Tisei (former Minority Leader)
- Eleven Massachusetts State Representatives: Keiko Orrall, Shawn Dooley, Bradley Jones Jr., (Minority Leader) Donnie Berthiaume, Gary Coon (former Assistant Minority Whip), Sheila Harrington, Reed V. Hillman (former), Matt Muratore, Todd Smola, Susannah Whipps Lee, Donald Wong
- Four Michigan State Senators: Kenneth Horn, Rick Jones, Dale Zorn, Mike Shirkey
- Fourteen Michigan State Representatives: Joseph Graves, Klint Kesto, Kurt Heise, Mike Callton, Aric Nesbitt (Majority Leader), Jeff Farrington, Gail Haines (former), Joseph Haveman (former), Martin Howrylak, Eileen Kowall (former), Eric Leutheuser, Peter Lucido, Roger Victory, Michael Webber
- Seven Minnesota State Senators: David Hann (Minority Leader), Gary Dahms, Scott Newman, Eric Pratt, Julie Rosen, Dave Senjem, Bill Weber
- Twenty Minnesota State Representatives: Jeff Johnson (former), Marty Seifert (former Minority Leader), Steve Sviggum (former Speaker), Joyce Peppin (Majority Leader), Tim O'Driscoll (Speaker Pro Tempore), Tony Albright, Sarah Anderson, Peggy Bennett, Drew Christensen, Brian Daniels, Jon Koznick, Bob Loonan, Denny McNamara, Roz Peterson, Duane Quam, Linda Runbeck, Tim Sanders, Dennis Smith, Mark Uglem, Dean Urdahl
- Four Mississippi State Senators: Kevin Blackwell, Eugene S. Clarke, Merle Flowers (former), Gray Tollison
- Four Mississippi State Representatives: Casey Eure, Mark Formby, Noah Sanford, Cory T. Wilson
- Missouri State Senator: Ron Richard (President)
- Fourteen Missouri State Representatives: Todd Richardson (House Speaker), Mike Cierpiot, Dan Shaul, Caleb Rowden, Shamed Dogan, Donna Lichtenegger, Rebecca Roeber, Lyndall Fraker, Tony Dugger, Jason Chipman, Jay Barnes, Justin Alferman, Elijah Haahr, Caleb Jones
- Seven Nevada State Senators: Patricia Farley, Ben Kieckhefer, Warren Hardy (former)., Michael Roberson (Senate Majority Leader), Joe Hardy (Senate President Pro Tempore), Scott Hammond (Co-Majority Whip), Becky Harris
- Nine Members of the Nevada Assembly: Erv Nelson, Derek Armstrong, Stephen Silberkraus, Glenn E. Trowbridge, David M. Gardner, Paul Anderson (Majority Leader), Patrick Hickey (former), Randy Kirner, Lynn D. Stewart
- Four New Hampshire State Senators: Regina Birdsell, Jim Luther (former), Jim Rausch (former), David Currier (former)
- Ten New Hampshire State Representatives: Alec Koromilas (former), Pamela Price (former Majority Whip), Dennis Green, Brian Chirichiello, Chris Nevins (former), Phyllis Woods (former), Robert Introne, Bill Nelson, John T. O'Connor, Wes Shuler (former)
- New Mexico State Representative: Monica Youngblood
- New York State Senator: Phil Boyle
- Six Members of the New York Assembly: Nicole Malliotakis, Marc W. Butler, Andrew Garbarino, Chad A. Lupinacci, L. Dean Murray, Anthony Palumbo
- Nine North Carolina State Representatives: Jason Saine, Mike Hager (Majority Leader), Paul Stam (Speaker Pro Tempore), John R. Bell, IV (Majority Whip), John R. Bradford III, Rob Bryan, Josh Dobson, Pat McElraft, Stephen M. Ross
- Three North Carolina State Senators: Andrew C. Brock, Jim Davis, Jeff Tarte
- Two North Dakota State Senators: Jonathan Casper, Jessica K. Unruh
- Eighteen Oklahoma State Senators: David Holt, Kim David, Eddie Fields, Jack Fry, A. J. Griffin, Wayne Shaw, Jason Smalley, Roger Thompson, Frank Simpson, Larry Boggs, Ervin Yen, Corey Brooks, Brian Crain, John Ford, Darcy Jech, Clark Jolley, Mike Mazzei, Ron Sharp
- Twelve Oklahoma State Representatives: Josh Cockroft, Randy Grau, Katie Henke, Terry O'Donnell, Leslie Osborn, Harold Wright, Paul Wesselhoft, Dan Kirby, Lee Denney (Speaker Pro Tempore), Mark McBride, John Michael Montgomery, Casey Murdock
- Oregon State Representative: Shawn Lindsay (former)
- Two Pennsylvania State Senators: Ryan Aument, Guy Reschenthaler
- Five Pennsylvania State Representatives: Mike Turzai (Speaker of the House), Jim Christiana, Stan Saylor, Jesse Topper, Jeff Haste (former)
- Puerto Rico Representative: Jenniffer González (Minority Leader)
- Three Rhode Island State Senators: Mark W. Gee, Francis Maher Jr. (former), John Pagliarini
- Four Rhode Island State Representatives: Brian Newberry (Minority Leader), Antonio Giarrusso, Robert Nardolillo, Daniel P. Reilly
- South Carolina State Senator: Larry Grooms
- Five South Carolina State Representatives: Nathan Ballentine, Neal Collins., Liston Barfield (former), Todd Atwater, Dan Hamilton
- South Dakota State Senator: Bob Gray (former President pro tempore)
- Five Tennessee State Representatives: Gerald McCormick (House Majority Leader), Jeremy Faison, Eddie Smith, Dan Howell, Ron Travis
- Three Tennessee State Senators: Brian Kelsey, Jack Johnson, Becky Duncan Massey
- Six Texas State Senators: Jon Lindsay (former), Dan Shelley (former), John Carona (former), Bob Deuell (former), Cyndi Taylor Krier (former), Florence Shapiro (former)
- Fifteen Texas State Representatives: James Frank, Larry Gonzales, Jason Isaac, Linda Harper-Brown (former), Martha Wong (former), Myra Crownover, Peggy Hamric (former), Jim Pitts (former), Raul Torres (former), Beverly Woolley (former), Bob Davis (former), Rick Galindo, Patricia Harless, Gilbert Peña, Elvira Reyna (former)
- Two Utah State Senators: Todd Weiler, Jerry Stevenson
- Nineteen Utah State Representatives: Greg Hughes (Speaker of the House), Stephen Handy, Becky Edwards, Douglas Sagers, Bradley Daw, Brad Dee, Mike McKell, Paul Ray, Bruce Cutler, Robert Spendlove, Keven Stratton, V. Lowry Snow, Lee Perry, Steve Eliason, Keith Grover, Mike Schultz, Jon Stanard, Michael Noel
- Three Vermont State Senators: Dustin Allard Degree, George R. Coppenrath (former), Wendy Wilton,
- Twenty-nine Vermont State Representatives: Robert Bancroft, Fred Baser, Stephen Beyor, Carolyn Whitney Branagan, William Canfield, Lawrence Cupoli, Dennis J. Devereux, Eileen Dickinson, Anne Donahue, Peter Fagan, Larry Fiske, Marianna Gamache, Michael Hebert, Robert Helm, Mark Higley, Robert LaClair, Marcia Martel, Corey Parent, Constance Quimby, Brian K. Savage, Butch Shaw, Harvey Smith, Vicki Strong, Job Tate, Thomas Terenzini, Warren Van Wyck, Kurt Wright, Thomas F. Koch (former), Pat McDonald (former)
- Virginia State Senator: Bryce Reeves
- Ten Virginia State Delegates: Tim Hugo, Kirk Cox (Majority Leader), Kathy Byron, Edward T. Scott, Rich Anderson, Jay Leftwich, Michael Webert, Jason Miyares (member-elect), Terry Kilgore, John O'Bannon
- Washington State Representative: Drew C. MacEwen
- Two West Virginia State Delegates: Danny Hamrick, Daryl Cowles (Majority Leader)
- Twenty Wisconsin State Representatives: Robin Vos (Speaker of the House), Jim Steineke (Majority Leader), Tyler August (Speaker Pro Tempore), John Nygren (Co-Chairman of Joint Finance Committee), Scott Allen, John Jagler, Adam Jarchow, Joel Kitchens, Scott Krug, Mike Kuglitsch, Bob Kulp, John Macco, Dave Murphy, Mike Rohrkaste, Ken Skowronski, David Steffen, Paul Tittl, Travis Tranel, Tyler Vorpagel, Jessie Rodriguez.
- Three Wisconsin State Senators: Leah Vukmir (Assistant Majority Leader), Devin LeMahieu, Van Wanggaard,
- Wyoming State Representative: Tim Stubson

Mayors and other municipal leaders

- Kevin Faulconer, mayor of San Diego
- William Snyder, Martin County Sheriff
- Tomás Regalado, Mayor of Miami
- Bryan Wagner, former New Orleans City Council member
- Ed Day, Rockland County Executive
- Tom Fetzer, former Mayor of Raleigh
- Orlando Sanchez, Harris County Treasurer
- Bryan Wagner, former member of the New Orleans City Council
- Bruce Goodson, former member of the James City County Virginia Board of Supervisors
- Bruce Woodbury, former Clark County Commissioner
- Knox H. White, Mayor of Greenville
- Kelly Downard, Louisville Metro Councilman
- Lenny Curry, Mayor of Jacksonville
- Lewis Evangelidis, Worcester County Sheriff
- Vinton Cassidy, Washington County Commissioner
- Rick Mystrom, former Mayor of Anchorage

International Politicians

- Bart De Wever, Leader of the New Flemish Alliance and Mayor of Antwerp
- Sivert Bjørnstad, Norwegian MP (Progress Party)
- Jan Arild Ellingsen, Norwegian MP (Progress Party)
- Bård Hoksrud, Norwegian MP (Progress Party)
- Sveinung Stensland, Norwegian MP (Conservative Party)
- Michael Tetzschner, Norwegian MP (Conservative Party)
- Christian Tybring-Gjedde, Norwegian MP (Progress Party)
- Erlend Wiborg, Norwegian MP (Progress Party)

Businesspeople

- Wayne Berman, donor and fundraiser
- Norman Braman, former owner of the Philadelphia Eagles
- Rob Couhig, New Orleans businessman, lawyer, and former Republican candidate for mayor and the U.S. House of Representatives
- Jose "Pepe" Fanjul, sugar industry
- Paul Singer, businessman, investor
- Frank L. VanderSloot, entrepreneur, radio network owner, rancher
- John Rakolta, CEO of Walbridge
- Kenneth C. Griffin, founder and CEO of Citadel
- Art Pope, philanthropist and businessman
- Gary J. Shapiro, President and CEO of the Consumer Electronics Association
- J. Larry Nichols, chairman of Devon Energy
- Jim Host, businessman
- Robert A. Funk, businessman
- Tom Love, entrepreneur
- David Green, founder and CEO of Hobby Lobby

Newspapers

- The Des Moines Register
- Sioux City Journal
- The Eagle-Tribune
- Las Vegas Review-Journal
- The Lowell Sun
- Boston Herald
- The Republican
- San Antonio Express-News
- Fort Worth Star-Telegram
- Arkansas Democrat-Gazette
- Star Tribune
- Pensacola News Journal
- Richmond Times-Dispatch
- Chattanooga Times Free Press
- Savannah Morning News
- The Tampa Tribune
- Miami Herald
- Orlando Sentinel
- Kane County Chronicle
- St. Louis Post-Dispatch
- Northwest Herald
- Chicago Tribune

Celebrities, commentators, and activists

- Rick Harrison, pawnbroker, Pawn Stars on History
- Chris Bravacos, strategist and bundler
- Babyface, singer-songwriter
- Niall Ferguson, historian and fellow of the Hoover Institute
- Mark Teixeira, Major League Baseball player for the New York Yankees
- Garry Kasparov, Human rights activist and former World Chess Champion
- Johnny Van Zant, lead singer of Lynyrd Skynyrd
- Anthony Ribustello, actor and Republican activist
- Bob Asher, Pennsylvania member of Republican National Committee
- Wayne Grudem, evangelical theologian, seminary professor, and author
- John Stephen, 2010 NH GOP gubernatorial nominee
- Michele Tafoya, sportscaster
- David Thul, Iraq War veteran and Republican activist
- Kurt Angle, professional wrestler
- Joni Eareckson Tada, disabilities advocate, Christian author and founder of the global ministry Joni and Friends
- Donnie Wahlberg, actor and member of New Kids on the Block (previously endorsed Carly Fiorina)

== See also ==
- Political positions of Marco Rubio
- 2016 Republican Party presidential primaries
- 2016 Republican Party presidential candidates
- 2016 Republican Party presidential debates
