= Richard Rock (disambiguation) =

Richard Rock (1690? – 1777) was a British physician.

Richard Rock may also refer to:

- Richard Rock (long jumper) (born 1967), Canadian long jumper
- Richard Rock (javelin thrower), Barbadian javelin thrower and medalist at the 1999 Central American and Caribbean Championships in Athletics
- Dickie Rock (1936–2024), Irish singer
- Richard Rock (Kansas politician) (1924–2013), Kansas state legislator
- Rand Rock (Richard Rand Rock II, 1949–2013), his son, member of the Kansas House of Representatives

== See also ==
- Rick Rock, American record producer
