= Joe Claeys =

American politician

Joseph Claeys

Member of the Kansas Senate from the 27th district
- Incumbent
- Assumed office January 13, 2025
- Preceded by: Chase Blasi (redistricted)

Personal details
- Party: Republican
- Relatives: J.R. Claeys (brother)
- Education: Kansas State University; Fort Hays State University

Joseph Claeys is an American politician and former psychologist serving as a member of the Kansas Senate from the 27th district since 2025.

== Early life and education ==
Claeys graduated from Kansas State University and earned a master’s and education specialist degree from Fort Hays State University.

== Career ==
Claeys was a school psychologist for 16 years and taught at Wichita State University for six years.

== Kansas Senate ==
=== Elections ===
After redistricting placed incumbent state senator Chase Blasi in the 26th district, Claeys announced his campaign for the open 27th district in 2024. He was unopposed in the Republican primary election and defeated Democrat Jennifer Herington in the general election with 61% of the vote.

=== Tenure ===
In 2025, Claeys opposed a bill that would ban school district employees from using a student's preferred name or pronouns without parental permission. He called the bill a violation of the First Amendment, stating "In my opinion, the Legislature needs to get out of the pronoun business entirely,” and that it would create "a litigation minefield" turning “classrooms into courtrooms” and "teachers into defendants." He supported SB 51, which would create a sales tax exemption for the construction or remodeling of data centers.

== Electoral history ==
2024 Kansas Senate election, District 27
Primary election
Party	Candidate	Votes	%
Republican	Joe Claeys	4,280	100.00
Total votes		4,280	100.00
General election
Republican	Joe Claeys	20,833	60.27
Democratic	Jennifer Herington	13,733	39.73
Total votes		34,566	100.00
Republican hold			

== Personal life ==
Claeys lives in Maize, Kansas. His brother, J.R. Claeys, served as a member of the Kansas Legislature from 2013 to 2025 until he resigned to become Administrator of the USDA's Rural Business-Cooperative Service.
