= Michael Terry Harris =

American politician (1946–2010)

Michael Harris

Member of the Kansas Senate from the 27th district
- In office 1993 – March 7, 1997
- Preceded by: Bill Morris
- Succeeded by: Leslie Donovan

Personal details
- Born: August 25, 1946 Jackson, Michigan, U.S.
- Died: May 30, 2010 (aged 63) Charlevoix, Michigan, U.S.
- Party: Republican
- Spouse: Ruth M. King

Michael Terry Harris (August 25, 1946 – May 30, 2010) was an American politician who was a Republican member of the Kansas Senate, representing the 27th district from 1993 until his resignation in 1997.
