= Joe Warren (Kansas politician) =

American politician

Member of the Kansas Senate from the 32nd district
- In office 1973–1988
- Succeeded by: Richard Rock

Member of the Kansas Senate from the 20th district
- In office 1965–1972

Member of the Kansas Senate from the 25th district
- In office 1957–1964

Personal details
- Born: September 17, 1912 Silverdale, Kansas, U.S.
- Died: December 23, 2003 Winfield, Kansas
- Party: Democratic

Joe E. Warren (September 17, 1912–December 23, 2003) was an American politician who served in the Kansas State Senate as a Democrat from 1957 to 1988. He was reared and educated in Silverdale and Arkansas City, graduating from Arkansas City High School in 1931. Joe married Pauline Goff on September 4, 1932 at the Pilgrim Congregational Church in Arkansas City, Kansas. The couple made their home in Silverdale and then moved to a farm near Maple City, Kansas where they spent the rest of their lives.
