= Pamela Price =

Pamela Price may refer to:

- Pamela Price (California politician)
- Pamela Price (New Hampshire politician)
