= William Talbert Morris =

American politician

Bill Morris

Member of the Kansas Senate from the 27th district
- In office 1977–1992
- Preceded by: Vincent E. Moore
- Succeeded by: Michael Terry Harris

Member of the Kansas House of Representatives from the 94th district
- In office 1973–1976

Personal details
- Born: March 10, 1924 Tulsa, Oklahoma, U.S.
- Died: September 25, 1993 (aged 69) Wichita, Kansas
- Party: Republican
- Spouse: Dorothy Morris

William Talbert Morris (March 10, 1924–September 25, 1993) was a Republican member of the Kansas state legislature. He was originally elected to the Kansas House of Representatives in 1972, and served two terms there before running successfully for the Kansas State Senate in 1976. He spent 16 years in the Senate, and was succeeded by Michael Terry Harris.
