= Röber =

Röber or Roeber is a German surname. Notable people with the surname include:

- Ernest Roeber (1861–1944), German-American wrestler
- Johannes Röber (1861–1942), German entomologist
- Jürgen Röber (born 1953), German footballer and manager
- Mark Rober (born 1980), American YouTuber, engineer and inventor
- Rebecca Roeber (1958–2019), American politician
- Richard Rober (1906–1952), American actor
- Rick Roeber (born 1955), American former politician facing abuse allegations
