= Rober =

Rober may refer to:

- Röber, a list of people with the surname Röber, Rober or Roeber
- Rober (footballer), Spanish footballer Roberto González Bayón (born 2001)
- Roberto Rober Correa (born 1992), Spanish footballer
- Rober Eryol (1930–2000), Turkish footballer
- Rober Haddeciyan (1926–2025), Turkish-Armenian writer, playwright, and journalist
- Roberto Robert Ibáñez (born 1993), Spanish footballer
- Roberto Róber Pier (born 1995), Spanish footballer
- Roberto Rober Sierra (born 1996), Spanish footballer
