= Greta Goodwin =

American politician (1936–2010)

Member of the Kansas Senate from the 32nd district
- In office January 13, 1997 – January 12, 2009
- Preceded by: Richard Rock
- Succeeded by: Steve Abrams

Member of the Kansas House of Representatives from the 78th district
- In office January 11, 1993 – January 13, 1997
- Preceded by: Dorothy Flottman
- Succeeded by: Judith Showalter

Personal details
- Born: October 1, 1936 Winfield, Kansas, U.S.
- Died: December 8, 2010 (aged 74) Winfield, Kansas, U.S.
- Party: Democratic
- Spouse: Jim Goodwin (deceased)
- Children: 4
- Education: Wichita State University
- Occupation: Certified Legal Assistant, Banker

Greta Hall Goodwin (October 1, 1936 - December 8, 2010) was a Democratic member of the Kansas Senate, representing the 32nd district from 1997 until 2008. Earlier, she was a member of the Kansas House of Representatives from 1993 through 1996.

== Birth ==
Goodwin was born in Winfield, Kansas on October 1, 1936.

== Family ==
Greta Goodwin was married to James, who also goes as "Jim", and together they had four children.

== Residence ==
Greta Goodwin resided in Winfield, Kansas where she also was raised.

== Education ==
Goodwin received her education from the following:

- Certification, National Certified Legal Assistant, 1988
- Legal Assistant Degree, Wichita State University
- Attended Cowley County Community College

== Professional experience ==
Goodwin has had the following professional experience:

- Banking Profession
- Certified Legal Assistant
- Adjunct Faculty, Cowley County Community College
- Law Profession

== Political experience ==
Goodwin had the following political experience:

- Candidate, Kansas State Senate, District 32, 2008
- Senator, Kansas State Senate, 1996–2008
- Representative, Kansas State House, 1992–1996
