= Phillip Journey =

American politician

Member of the Kansas Senate from the 26th district
- In office 2003–2008
- Preceded by: Nancey Harrington
- Succeeded by: Dick Kelsey

Personal details
- Born: April 2, 1956 (age 70) Kansas City, Kansas, U.S.
- Party: Republican
- Spouse: Suyapa Journey

Phillip B. Journey (born April 2, 1956) is an American politician and judge.

Journey was born in Kansas City, Kansas, on April 2, 1956. He studied business at Washburn University, then attended the Oklahoma City University School of Law.

Following Nancey Harrington's resignation from the Kansas Senate in 2003, Journey was appointed to complete her term, starting in 2004. A Republican, Journey represented the 26th district until 2008. He was then appointed to Kansas's 18th Judicial District Court for Division 1. He ran unopposed for reelection twice until defeating Joni Cole in 2020.

His daughter is Carol Journey, a houseguest on CBS' Big Brother 8 in 2007. She was eliminated (evicted) first, placing 14th.

== Restore NRA campaign ==
Journey is a board member of the National Rifle Association of America (NRA). In 2021 during NRA bankruptcy proceedings, Journey asked the bankruptcy court to appoint an independent examiner to investigate allegations of fraud by senior leadership at the NRA. This motion was unsuccessful when the judge refused the NRA's filing for Chapter 11 protection, describing it as "not being filed in good faith". Having personally incurred significant legal costs, Journey founded the "Restore The NRA" campaign to raise legal defense funds and call for organisational reform.
