= Senator Harrington =

Senator Harrington may refer to:

- Dan Harrington (politician) (born 1938), Montana State Senate
- David C. Harrington (born 1954), Maryland State Senate
- J. J. Harrington (1919–2008), North Carolina State Senate
- John Harrington (American politician) (born 1956), Minnesota State Senate
- Joseph B. Harrington (1908–1964), Massachusetts State Senate
- Kathy Harrington (born 1958), North Carolina State Senate
- Kevin B. Harrington (1929–2008), Massachusetts State Senate
- Nancey Harrington (born 1953), Kansas State Senate
- Vincent F. Harrington (1903–1943), Iowa State Senate
