= Senator Abrams =

Senator Abrams may refer to:

- Mary Abrams (1958–2025), Connecticut State Senate
- Rosalie Silber Abrams (1916–2009), Maryland State State Senate
- Steve Abrams (born 1949), Kansas State Senate
- William J. Abrams (1829–1900), Wisconsin State Senate
