= Senator Kelsey =

Senator Kelsey may refer to:

- Charles S. Kelsey (1822–1901), Wisconsin State Senate
- Dick Kelsey (politician) (born 1946), Kansas State Senate
- Edwin B. Kelsey (1826–1861), Wisconsin State Senate
