= Kim Wells =

Kim Wells may refer to:

- Kim Wells (Kansas politician) (born 1949), Kansas Republican Party chairman
- Kim Wells (Victoria politician) (born 1958t, treasurer of Victoria
- Kimberley Wells (born 1985), Australian cyclist
