= Pat McDonald (politician) =

American politician

Patricia A. Mcdonald (born 1943) is a Republican politician who was elected and currently serves in the Vermont House of Representatives. She represents the Washington-3-3 Representative District.
