= Joe Edwards (Kansas politician) =

American politician

Member of the Kansas House of Representatives from the 93rd district
- In office 2013 – August 19, 2014
- Preceded by: Dan Kerschen
- Succeeded by: John R. Whitmer

Personal details
- Born: September 16, 1954
- Died: August 19, 2014 Haysville, Kansas
- Party: Republican
- Spouse: Sally Edwards
- Children: 4

George F. "Joe" Edwards II (September 16, 1954–August 19, 2014) was an American politician who served in the Kansas House of Representatives as a Republican from the 93rd district from 2013 until his death in 2014.

Edwards was elected to the 93rd district seat in 2012, after incumbent Dan Kerschen ran for the Kansas Senate instead of seeking re-election. He faced no opposition in the primary election and won the general election with 49% of the vote (defeating both Democrat Sammy Flaherty, with 19% of the vote, and independent candidate Daniel Thimesch, with 32%).

In the 2014 primary, Edwards lost to challenger John R. Whitmer. He died before his term expired, and Whitmer was appointed to replace him.
