= Gene Suellentrop =

American politician

Majority Leader of the Kansas Senate
- In office January 11, 2021 – April 9, 2021
- Preceded by: Jim Denning
- Succeeded by: Larry Alley

Member of the Kansas Senate from the 27th district
- In office January 11, 2017 – January 2, 2023
- Preceded by: Leslie Donovan
- Succeeded by: Chase Blasi

Member of the Kansas House of Representatives from the 91st district
- In office January 9, 2013 – January 10, 2017
- Preceded by: Brenda Landwehr
- Succeeded by: Greg Lakin

Member of the Kansas House of Representatives from the 105th district
- In office December 14, 2009 – January 8, 2013
- Preceded by: Jason Watkins
- Succeeded by: Mark Hutton

Personal details
- Born: January 1, 1952 (age 74) Colwich, Kansas, U.S.
- Party: Republican
- Spouse: Christine Suellentrop
- Children: 4
- Education: Saint Gregory's University
- Website: Official website

Gene Suellentrop (born January 1, 1952) is an American politician who was a Republican member of the Kansas State Senate, representing the 27th district from January 11, 2017, to January 2, 2023. He served as the Senate's Majority Leader beginning in January 2021.

After an intoxicated high-speed freeway police chase in the wrong direction on March 16, 2021, he was removed as Senate Majority Leader by a caucus vote in April 2021, but not from the Senate itself. Before being elected to the state senate, he had served two terms in the Kansas house, then was elected to the senate in 2016.

== Career ==
Suellentrop created the Gambino's pizza parlor franchise, later retitled, The Sauce Brands. By 2000, he had licensed 63 regional franchises in five states, including 40 in Kansas. When Wichita area franchisees discovered the corporation, G.P.A, Inc., had been surreptitiously receiving kickbacks from required suppliers, they sued it for damages involving alleged breach of contract and antitrust violations in a class-action lawsuit. In November 2011 he also complained, in his presidency of the Kansas chapter of the National Restaurant and Hospitality Association, that the Obama Administration dictated an "unprecedented intrusion" by ordering workplaces to display an 11" by 17" poster that informed employees of their right to unionize.

== Tenure ==
Suellentrop was a member of the Kansas House of Representatives from 2009 to 2013. He was elected to the state senate in 2016, taking office in 2017. Suellentrop represents northwestern Wichita and rural areas to the west and north of his district. While the senate's Majority Leader, Suellentrop opposed Medicaid expansion and rejected the efficacy of wearing masks during the COVID-19 pandemic.

== DUI Arrest ==
On March 16, 2021, Suellentrop was arrested by Capitol Police for driving on the wrong side of Interstate 70, driving under the influence (DUI) and felony fleeing from a law enforcement officer. He was captured after a ten-minute high-speed chase in which he had evaded one nail strip by driving around it but was stopped by another which punctured his tires.

The Shawnee County District Attorney subsequently had refiled escalated charges against Suellentrop, which included felony eluding law enforcement and misdemeanor driving under the influence. Suellentrop refused to take a breath test. His blood alcohol content was 0.17%, more than twice the legal limit despite having been taken three hours after his arrest. He only provided it due to being compelled by a search warrant ordered by a judge. Court filings and the arresting trooper's testimony alleged that Suellentrop narrowly avoided at least two near-head on collisions with oncoming motorists, making physical threats as his blood was tested for alcohol level, three hours after his life-threatening flight had been stopped. The officer said the 69-year-old senator taunted him, bragging that he could "take" the trooper in a physical fight.

In Suellentrop's absence, senators invoked a procedural move that would force all 40 senators to vote on a critical education bill that was lacking a single vote for passage. It seemed Suellentrop would have been forced to cast the deciding vote until legislators postponed further debate until April 9, 2021. Kansas State Senate President Ty Masterson defended his pushing to secure Suellentrop's vote, pointing out that he was still a sitting senator despite his legal difficulties, saying the events had significant effects on the Senate's regular order of business, and his behavior had provoked "unnecessary anger, unnecessary power plays. Suellentrop returned to the capitol, but the vote on the education bill failed by a one-vote margin.

Rather than Suellentrop resigning his caucus position, Masterson said most of Suellentrop's duties would be temporarily assigned to Republican Assistant Leader, Larry Alley, "...until matters that I am currently dealing with are resolved." His statement avoided addressing those allegations against him. Instead he indicated his priority was focused on redistricting.

More rank-and-file Republican senators showed frustration as Suellentrop's legal difficulties impeded the last days of the legislative session. Republican Senator Rick Kloos demanded that the caucus vote on Suellentrop's future service the next morning, April 9th. Masterson said that it wasn't possible yet, but that GOP members would discuss the matter the next day. Kloos said he had discussed matters with other members, who shared his frustration with the previous day's events. It was undetermined if a vote to resolve the issue would be on April 9th, or in the following month when they would return to conclude legislative business. Kloos said he desired rapid resolution of the issue so the senators could get closure; "It's just time. We've all been patient."

On April 9, Masterson requested that Suellentrop step down from his leadership post as the body reacted to new details regarding Sellentrop's arrest. He said, "Obviously consequences need to come, it is a matter of time." "I do think when emotions are high you don't make your best decisions. But I think it's clear the majority leader needs to vacate the leadership office." Later that day Suellentrop was removed from his position by his Republican caucus. The Republican caucus vote, taken in his absence, was 22–4 in favor to "non-retain" him. The deciding factor persuading the caucus to take its removal action, was its receipt of the trooper's affidavit. Alley assumed Suellentrop's duties and inherited the Majority Leader's staff until the legislature reconvened in May.

Suellentrop, a millionaire, had continued to collect the added pay of $487 bi-weekly even though he had surrendered most of his duties. His hearings had been scheduled for June 28, then for August 5.

On October 25, Suellentrop pleaded no contest to DUI and reckless driving but was only sentenced to two days in jail. The Shawnee County D.A. had accepted a deal in which a felony charge of attempting to elude law enforcement was dropped, as was an additional, lesser charge, of driving the wrong way on a divided highway. District Judge Jason Geier sentenced him to 6 months in the county jail for his DUI plus 90 days for reckless driving. The confinement sentences were suspended, but the 69-year-old senator was only given 48 hours in jail, to be served November 18–20, 2021, in addition to a year's probation. His driver's license was temporarily suspended after which he will be required to have an ignition interlock installed when it is reinstated. He was also ordered to pay a fine of $775 plus $218 in court costs.

Judge Geier determined the senator hadn't been forced into accepting the plea bargain. Deputy D.A.Charles Kitt said Suellentrop's request for diversion was denied. Geier stated that Suellentrop's sentence was typical for a first-time DUI offender. The Kansas Highway Patrol (KHP) testified that his blood-alcohol level, taken hours after his arrest after a judge ordered he had to provide a sample, was still 0.17, over double the Kansas legal limit of 0.08. When finally forced to stop, Suellentrop had been speeding up to 90 miles an hour. The KHP officer said the senator when his reckless path had been blocked, had called him "donut boy." Recordings of 911 calls and KHP radio transmissions had been received from the Shawnee County Sheriff in response to reporters' Kansas Open Records Act (KORA) requests which documented that calls had reported Suellentrop's SUV traveling the wrong way on Interstate-470 near a Kansas freeway exit south of the Capitol in Topeka, then additionally on Interstate 70 through northern Topeka. Suellentrop's lawyer, despite considerable evidence to the contrary, told the judge that Suellentrop was unaware that police were behind him, and after he understood what was going on, "He was not disagreeable." suggesting, "...maybe there were some misunderstandings." "...thank God no one was hurt."

== Personal life ==
Suellentrop and his wife Christine reside in Wichita. They have had four children, Matt, Daniel, Sarah and Tony.

Kansas Senate
Preceded by Jim Denning	Majority Leader of the Kansas Senate; 2021	Succeeded by Larry Alley
