= Geraldine Flaharty =

American politician (born 1936)

Member of the Kansas House of Representatives from the 98th district
- In office November 21, 1995 – January 14, 2013
- Preceded by: Joel Rutledge
- Succeeded by: Phil Hermanson

Personal details
- Born: March 4, 1936 (age 90) Parsons, Kansas, U.S.
- Party: Democratic Party
- Education: Wichita State University

Geraldine Flaharty (born March 4, 1936) is a former member of the Kansas House of Representatives, representing the 98th district. She had served from November 21, 1995, to January 14, 2013.

Since 1966, Flaharty has worked as a reading teacher at Oaklawn Elementary School. She has her BS and ME degrees from Wichita State University.

Flaharty has been involved with a number of community organizations, including the American Association of University Women, International Reading Association, Kansas National Education Association, Sedgwick County Zoo, and Wichita Center for the Arts.

== Committee membership ==
- Education
- Health and Human Services (Ranking Member)
- Aging and Long Term Care
- Economic Development and Tourism
- Joint Committee on Pensions, Investments and Benefits
- Select Committee on KPERS (Ranking Member)

== Major donors ==
The top 5 donors to Flaharty's 2008 campaign:

- 1. Kansas Realtors Assoc $500
- 2. Southfork Investment $500
- 3. Kansans for Lifesaving Cures $500
- 4. Chesapeake Energy $500
- 5. Kansas National Education Assoc $500
