= Stephanie Byers =

American politician (born 1963)

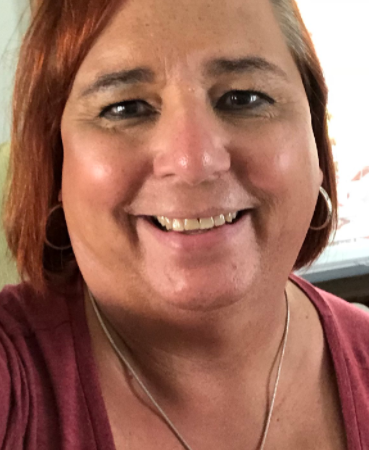
- Byers in 2020

Member of the Kansas House of Representatives from the 86th district
- In office January 11, 2021 – January 9, 2023
- Preceded by: Jim Ward
- Succeeded by: Silas Miller

Personal details
- Born: February 5, 1963 (age 63) Norman, Oklahoma, U.S.
- Party: Democratic
- Spouse: Lori Haas
- Education: Oklahoma Christian University (BM); Kansas State University (MM)

Stephanie Byers (born February 5, 1963) is an American politician and educator who served in the Kansas House of Representatives from the 86th district. Her victory in the 2020 election made her the first openly transgender person to serve in the Kansas Legislature and the first transgender Native American person, a member of the Chickasaw Nation, elected to office in the United States, but she did not run for reelection.

== Early life and education ==
Stephanie Byers was born February 5, 1963, in Norman, Oklahoma. Byers came out as transgender in 2014. Byers graduated from Oklahoma Christian University with a Bachelor of Music Education in 1986 and later Kansas State University with a Master of Music in 2015.

== Career ==
=== Teaching ===
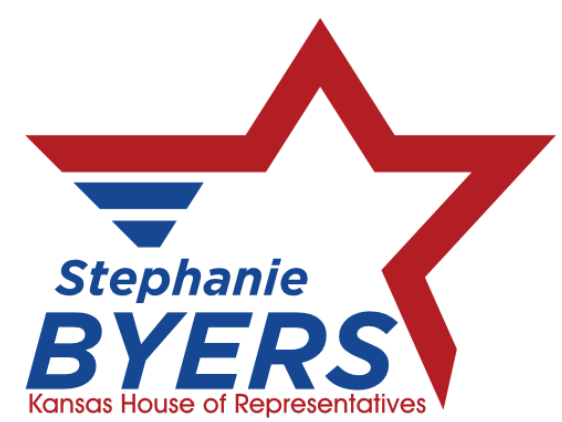
Stephanie Byers's campaign logo

Byers taught at Wichita North High School for 29 years before retiring in 2019. In 2018, she was given the National Educator of the Year award by the GLSEN. From 2018 to 2020, she served on the board of Wichita Pride where during her tenure she served as the Communications Director and Board Secretary. She spoke at a rally outside of the Supreme Court of the United States on behalf of GLSEN while the court was hearing arguments in Bostock v. Clayton County.

=== Kansas House of Representatives ===
In 2019, Byers announced that she would seek the Democratic nomination for the Kansas House of Representatives from the 86th district to succeed Jim Ward, who was seeking election to the Kansas Senate. She won the Democratic nomination and was elected in the general election becoming the first transgender person elected to the Kansas legislature and the first transgender Native American (as a member of the Chickasaw Nation) elected to office in the United States. During the campaign she raised $31,578.15 while her Republican opponent, Cyndi Howerton, raised $9,360.05.

In June 2022, she dropped out of her primary for reelection, citing a need for devoting attention to dealing with health issues experienced by both her own and her wife's aging parents. She described the prior legislative session as "tough," adding, "We knew going in that we were going to see legislation that was going to attack the trans community. It was accompanied by hateful comments on social media. Hateful emails." Despite having received support from many people she added, "there's an emotional exhaustion that comes from having those repeated attacks over and over again."

== Electoral history ==
Kansas House of Representatives 86th district election, 2020
Primary election
Party	Candidate	Votes	%
Democratic	Stephanie Byers	1,105	100.00
Total votes		1,105	100.00
General election
Democratic	Stephanie Byers	3,616	55.49
Republican	Cyndi Howerton	2,901	44.51
Total votes		6,517	100.00

== See also ==
- Althea Garrison, first transgender person elected to a state legislature
- List of transgender public officeholders in the United States
- List of Native American politicians
- Native American women in politics
