= Leslie Donovan =

American politician

Member of the Kansas Senate from the 27th district
- In office January 8, 1997 – January 10, 2017
- Preceded by: Michael Terry Harris
- Succeeded by: Gene Suellentrop

Personal details
- Born: May 5, 1936 (age 90) Wray, Colorado, U.S.
- Party: Republican
- Spouse: Mary
- Children: 3
- Profession: auto dealer

Leslie D. "Les" Donovan, Sr. (May 5, 1936) was a Republican member of the Kansas Senate, representing the 27th district from 1997 to 2017. He was the Assistant Majority Leader in 2001 and was a delegate to the National Republican Convention in 2000. He was a Kansas Representative from 1992 to 1997.

He is an auto dealer from Wichita.

== Committee assignments ==
Donovan served on these legislative committees:

- Assessment and Taxation (chair)
- Judiciary
- Transportation

== Sponsored legislation ==
Legislation sponsored or co-sponsored by Donovan includes:

- An amendment to have supreme court justices' appointments subject to consent of the senate.
- A resolution to create a budget stabilization fund
- A bill regarding campaign finance reform

== Major donors ==
Some of the top contributors to Les Donovan's 2008 campaign, according to the National Institute on Money in State Politics:

Kansas Republican Senatorial Committee, Koch Industries, Kansas Contractors Association, Kansas Association of Realtors, Kansas Medical Society, Kansas Bankers Association

Financial, insurance and real estate companies were his largest donor group.

== Elections ==
=== 2012 ===
Donovan was unopposed in the 2012 Republican primary. He defeated Democratic nominee Diana Cubbage in the general election, by a margin of 20,773 to 10,922 — 65.5 percent to 34.5 percent. In their primaries, Donovan had won 7,455 votes; Cubbage 1,044 votes.

Cubbage, a Wichita educator, had been unopposed in the 2012 Democratic Primary. She had been endorsed by the Kansas Education Association, the American Federation of Teachers-Kansas and the AFL-CIO.
