= Phil Hermanson =

American politician

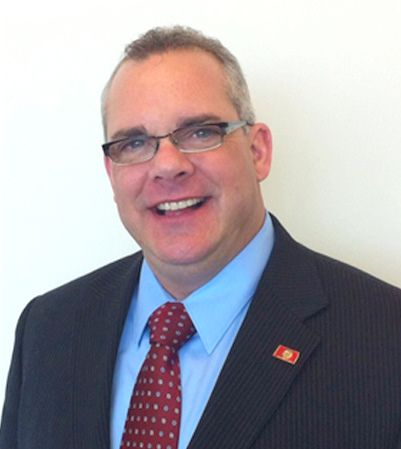

Member of the Kansas House of Representatives from the 98th district
- In office January 14, 2013 – October 31, 2013
- Preceded by: Geraldine Flaharty
- Succeeded by: Steven Anthimides

Member of the Kansas House of Representatives from the 96th district
- In office January 12, 2009 – January 14, 2013
- Preceded by: Terry McLachlan
- Succeeded by: Brandon Whipple

Personal details
- Born: February 28, 1965 (age 61) Wichita, Kansas, U.S.
- Party: Republican
- Website: Kansas Legislature members

Military service
- Allegiance: United States
- Branch/service: United States Navy

Phil Hermmanson (born February 28, 1965) is an American politician and former member of the Kansas House of Representatives for District 96 (2008-2012) and 98, serving from 2008 to 2012. He is a Republican. His districts included southwest Wichita, Kansas. He resigned in 2013.

== Early life, education, and career ==
Hermanson is a lifelong resident of Wichita, Kansas. After graduating Goddard High School, five miles from Wichita, Kansas, he joined the United States Navy and served as a deep sea diver from 1983 to 1990. While in the military, Hermanson attended the University of Virginia and pursued his bachelor's degree in business.

== Kansas Legislature ==
=== 2008 election ===
On November 4, 2008, Hermanson was elected to the 96th District Seat in the Kansas House of Representatives to represent the southern district of Wichita, Kansas, defeating Terry McLachlan (D). Hermanson raised $18,340 for his campaign, while McLachlan raised $43,623.

Kansas House of Representatives, District 96

Candidates	Votes	Percent
Phil Hermanson (R)	3,442	50.2%
Terry McLachlan (D)	3,414	49.7%

=== 2010 election ===
Hermanson won re-election to represent southern Wichita, Kansas for the 96th District seat against Brandon Whipple (D). Hermanson had no opposition in the GOP primary. The general election took place on November 2, 2010, in Wichita, Kansas.

Kansas House of Representatives, District 96 General Election (2010)

Candidates	Votes
Phil Hermanson (R)	2,660
Brandon Whipple (D)	2,355

=== 2012 redistricting ===
The U.S. Census counts every resident in the United States. It is mandated by Article I, Section 2 of the Constitution and takes place every 10 years. The data collected by the decennial census determine the number of seats each state has in the U.S. House of Representatives and is also used to distribute billions in federal funds to local communities. Census data is also used to redistrict state legislative internal boundaries or districts. Through this process, Phil no longer represented the 96th District, but was now to represent the 98th District.

=== 2012 election ===
Hermanson won re-election to represent southern Wichita, Kansas for the 98th District seat against Geraldine Flaharty (D). The general election took place on November 6, 2012, in Wichita, Kansas.

Kansas House of Representatives, District 98 General Election (2012)

Candidates	Votes
Phil Hermanson (R)	3,108
Geraldine Flaharty (D)	2,982

== Committee assignments ==
Committee assignments for 2009-2010

- Kansas House Commerce and Labor Company
- Kansas House Financial Institutions Committee
- Kansas House Health and Human Services Committee
- Kansas House Insurance Committee

Committee assignments for 2011-2012

- Kansas House Energy and Utilities Committee
- Kansas House Financial Institutions Committee
- Kansas House Health and Human Services Committee
- Kansas House Insurance Committee, Vice Chair

Joint committee assignments for 2011-2012

- Joint House Committee for Tribal Relations
- Joint House Committee for Special Claims Against the State

== Sponsored bills ==
- HB2035 - Amending statutes regulating late-term and partial birth abortion.
- HB2087 - Concerning the protection of rights granted under the constitution.
- HB2126 - Elections; municipalities; primary and general election date change
- HB2129 - Enacting the health care freedom act.
- HB2156 - Five-year phase out of income tax on corporations.
- HB2212 - Transferring moneys to the local ad valorem tax reduction fund.
- HB2218 - Abortion regulation based on capacity of unborn child to feel pain.
- HB2254 - Covenant marriages; procedures for divorce and separate maintenance.
- HB2454 - Income tax checkoff; Kansas arts commission checkoff fund.
- HB2533 - Amending requirements and penalties for failure to report suspected child abuse.
- HB2534 - Amending requirements and penalties for failure to report death or disappearance of a child and interference with law enforcement.
- HB2614 - Designating the junction between I-70 and US 183 as the CW2 Bryan J. Nichols fallen veterans memorial interchange.
- HB2681 - Allowing the interstate purchase of accident and sickness insurance and establishing requirements for out-of-state insurers.

== Sponsored resolutions ==
- HCR5007 - Constitutional amendment to preserve right to choose health care services and participate in health insurance plan.
- HR6005 - A RESOLUTION Honoring former Kansas Representative Don Rezac.
- HR6013 - A RESOLUTION in memory of Jim Morrison.
- HR6014 - A RESOLUTION honoring former Kansas representative Dick Wellman.
- HR6019 - A RESOLUTION honoring former Kansas Representative Howard Sell.
- HR6022 - A RESOLUTION recognizing April as the Month of the Military Child.
- HR6030 - A RESOLUTION In memory of Representative Terry McLachlan
- HR6031 - A RESOLUTION congratulating the Wichita State University Shockers for winning the 2011 National Invitation Tournament.
- HR6032 - A RESOLUTION congratulating and commending Victor Ortiz for becoming the WBC welterweight boxing champion.
- HCR5007 - Constitutional amendment to preserve right to choose health care services and participate in health insurance plan.
- HR6006 - Memorials; Rocky Fund.
- HR6014 - Designating the Honor and Remember Flag.

== Donations ==
The top 5 donors to Hermanson's 2012 campaign:

1. U.S. Chamber of Commerce
2. Berkshire Hathaway
3. Kansas Bankers Association
4. National Association of Realtors
5. American Dental Association

The top 5 donors to Hermanson's 2010 campaign:

1. National Association of Realtors
2. Koch Industries
3. U.S. Chamber of Commerce
4. Kansas Medical Society
5. Prairie Band Potawatomi Nation

== Controversy and resignation ==
On May 26, 2010, Hermanson was found guilty of DUI resulting from a November 2009 incident in Wichita. He pleaded no contest. On July 8, 2010, he was sentenced to one-year probation for driving under the influence of prescription drugs. Additionally, was ordered to pay a $500 fine and court costs. He paid the fine within 30 days of the order, and completed his probation successfully.

On May 16, 2012, the Kansas Governmental Ethics Commission fined Hermanson's treasurer $500 for failing to provide documentation for $3700 in expenditures by the 2010 campaign.

Hermanson was appointed Director of the Kansas Department of Health and Environment (KanCare) but was not confirmed by the State Senate. Questions were raised about his recent bankruptcy, unpaid taxes and a DUI conviction, as well as general competency for the job since he did not have a background in either law or insurance. He resigned after only a few months. (2014)
