= Dan Kerschen =

American politician (born 1952)

Member of the Kansas Senate from the 26th district
- In office January 14, 2013 – January 13, 2025
- Preceded by: Dick Kelsey
- Succeeded by: Chase Blasi

Member of the Kansas House of Representatives from the 93rd district
- In office January 12, 2009 – January 14, 2013
- Preceded by: Dick Kelsey
- Succeeded by: George F. Edwards

Personal details
- Born: August 2, 1952 (age 74) Wichita, Kansas, U.S.
- Party: Republican
- Spouse: Norene Kerschen
- Children: 5
- Education: Kansas State University (B.S.)

Daniel J. Kerschen (born August 2, 1952) is an American politician from the state of Kansas. He served as a Republican member of the Kansas House of Representatives from 2009 to 2013, and of the Kansas Senate from 2013 to 2025, representing the 26th district. He did not seek re-election in 2024.

He has a B.S. from Kansas State University.

== Major donors ==
The top 5 donors to Kerschen's 2008 campaign:

1. Kerschen, Dan $2,426
2. Kansas Chamber of Commerce & Industry $500
3. Koch Industries $500
4. Sunflower Dairy PAC $500
5. Heart PAC $500
