= John R. Whitmer =

American politician

John Whitmer

Member of the Kansas House of Representatives from the 93rd district
- In office September 9, 2014 – 2018
- Preceded by: Joe Edwards
- Succeeded by: J.C. Moore

Personal details
- Party: Republican
- Spouse: Marlena Whitmer
- Education: University of Kansas

John R. Whitmer is an American politician who served two terms in the Kansas House of Representatives as a Republican from the 93rd district from 2014 to 2018.

Whitmer was originally appointed to fill the 93rd district seat left vacant by the death of Joe Edwards. He won election in his own right on the November 2014 ballot, and served for two terms before losing the 2018 primary election to fellow Republican J.C. Moore in a close race; Whitmer received 49% of the vote.

After leaving the legislature, Whitmer worked as a talk radio host.
