= Brenda Landwehr =

American politician

Member of the Kansas House of Representatives from the 105th district
- In office January 11, 2017 – January 13, 2023
- Preceded by: Mark Hutton
- Succeeded by: Jill Ward

Member of the Kansas House of Representatives from the 91st district
- In office January 9, 1995 – January 14, 2013
- Preceded by: Thomas A. Bishop
- Succeeded by: Gene Suellentrop

Personal details
- Born: March 8, 1955 (age 71) Wichita, Kansas, U.S.
- Party: Republican
- Spouse: David Landwehr
- Children: 3

Brenda Landwehr (born March 8, 1955) is an American politician who served as a Republican member of the Kansas House of Representatives. She is the owner of LT Care Solutions, Inc., and is a member of Christ the King Church, Comcare Mental Health Advisory Board, and the Salvation Army Foster Care Advisory Board.

== Career ==
Landwehr was originally elected in the 91st district in 1994 to the Kansas House of Representatives, serving from 1995 to the end of the 2012 legislative session. On October 25, 2011, Landwehr announced that she would not run for reelection to the Kansas House, but would instead seek election to the Kansas Senate in District 25, then held by incumbent Republican Senator Jean Schodorf in the 2012 election. She lost her state senate bid, and then ran and lost a bid for District 92's Kansas House seat in 2014. In 2016, Landwehr was elected to the District 105 seat in the Kansas House. She did not run for re-election in 2024.

== Committee membership ==
- Health and Human Services (Chair)
- Government Efficiency and Fiscal Oversight
- Joint Committee on Health Policy Oversight (Vice-chair)
- Joint Committee on Home and Community Based Services Oversight
