= Ron Howard (politician) =

American politician (1953–2021)

Member of the Kansas House of Representatives from the 98th district
- In office January 14, 2019 – July 20, 2021
- Preceded by: Steven Crum
- Succeeded by: Cyndi Howerton

Personal details
- Born: September 20, 1953 Wichita, Kansas, U.S.
- Died: July 20, 2021 (aged 67) Wichita, Kansas, U.S.
- Party: Republican
- Spouse: Terri
- Children: 3

Ron Dean Howard (September 20, 1953 – July 20, 2021) was an American politician who served in the Kansas House of Representatives from the 98th district from 2019 to 2021.

He died on July 20, 2021, in Wichita, Kansas, at age 67.
