= Jill Ward =

American politician

Member of the Kansas House of Representatives from the 105th district
- Incumbent
- Assumed office January 13, 2025
- Preceded by: Brenda Landwehr

Personal details
- Party: Republican
- Profession: account executive
- Website: jillwardforkansas.com

Jill Ward is an American politician from Kansas who currently represents the 105th district of the Kansas House of Representatives. She is a Republican.

== Biography ==
Ward is a life-long resident of Wichita and worked as an account executive for a distributor of facility supplies.

=== State representative ===
Incumbent Republican Brenda Landwehr announced she would be retiring with Ward facing off against David Hickman in the Republican primaries. Ward centered her campaign on not being a career politician and supporting small business, while Hickman, a pastor with master's degrees in Bible psychology and Christian education ran a more conservative campaign. Ward would win with 949 votes to Hickman's 524 to face off against Democrat John Burke.

Burke, who earned a master's degree from the University of Arizona and a Ph.D. from Kansas State University worked as the superintendent of the Haysville School District and worked as an adjunct professor at several universities. Ward would beat Burke with 5,258 votes (59%) to Burke's 3,654 (41%).

== Personal life ==
Jill is married to Todd Wolters and is a Catholic.
