= Washington-3-1 Vermont Representative District, 2002–2012 =

American legislative district

Coordinates: 44°11′25″N 72°29′35″W

The Washington-3-1 Representative District is a one-member state Representative district in the U.S. state of Vermont. It is one of the 108 one or two member districts into which the state was divided by the redistricting and reapportionment plan developed by the Vermont General Assembly following the 2000 United States census. The plan applies to legislatures elected in 2002, 2004, 2006, 2008, and 2010. A new plan will be developed in 2012 following the 2010 United States census.

The Washington-3-1 District includes a section of the Washington County City of Barre defined as follows:

That portion of the City of Barre bounded on the north, east and south by Barre Town, and bounded on the west by a line running along the center of Hall Street to the intersection of Elm Street, then along the center of Elm Street to the intersection of North Main Street, then along the center of North Main Street to the intersection of Prospect Street, then along the center of Prospect Street to the intersection of Allen Street, then along the western back lot line of Allen Street to the Barre Town boundary.

— Vermont Statutes, Title 17, Chapter 34, Section 1893a

The rest of the City of Barre is in Washington-3-2 and Washington-3-3.

As of the 2000 census, the state as a whole had a population of 608,827. As there are a total of 150 representatives, there were 4,059 residents per representative (or 8,118 residents per two representatives). The one member Washington-3-1 District had a population of 4,173 in that same census, 2.81% above the state average.

== District representative ==
- Leo M. Valliere, Republican

== See also ==
- Members of the Vermont House of Representatives, 2005-2006 session
- Vermont Representative Districts, 2002-2012
