= Steven Crum =

American politician (born 1966)

Member of the Kansas House of Representatives from the 98th district
- In office 2017 – January 14, 2019
- Preceded by: Steve Anthimides
- Succeeded by: Ron Howard

Personal details
- Born: February 15, 1966
- Party: Democratic
- Spouse: Paige
- Education: Newman University, Wichita

Steven Crum (born February 15, 1966) is an American politician who served for one term as a Democrat in the Kansas House of Representatives during 2017 and 2018.

Crum attended Newman University, Wichita, where he received his bachelor's degree in education. He worked as a teacher in an elementary school and served on the city council of Haysville, Kansas before being elected to the Kansas House in 2016.

In 2016, Crum narrowly won the Democratic primary, 53% to 47%, and then won the general election by the same margin, defeating Republican incumbent Steve Anthimides.

In 2018, however, Crum was unable to hold on; he faced no opposition in the primary, but was defeated in the general election by Ron Howard.
