= Ronald B. Russell =

American politician

Ron Russell

Member of the Maine House of Representatives from the 17th district
- In office December 7, 2022 – December 10, 2024
- Preceded by: Dwayne Prescott
- Succeeded by: Steven Bishop

Personal details
- Party: Democratic
- Spouse: Jeanne
- Children: 4
- Education: University of Pennsylvania (BA)

Ronald B. Russell is an American politician who has served as a member of the Maine House of Representatives from December 7, 2022 until December 10, 2024. He represented Maine's 17th House district.

== Electoral history ==
He was elected on November 8, 2022, in the 2022 Maine House of Representatives election against Republican opponent Sherman Hutchins. He assumed office on December 7, 2022.

== Biography ==
Russell earned a Bachelor of Arts from the University of Pennsylvania.

Maine House of Representatives
Preceded by Dwayne Prescott	Member of the Maine House of Representatives from the 17th district 2022–2024	Succeeded by Steven Bishop
