= Larry Alley =

American politician

Majority Leader of the Kansas Senate
- In office April 9, 2021 – January 10, 2025; Acting: April 9, 2021 – May 26, 2021
- Preceded by: Gene Suellentrop
- Succeeded by: Chase Blasi

Member of the Kansas Senate from the 32nd district
- Incumbent
- Assumed office January 9, 2017
- Preceded by: Steve Abrams

Personal details
- Born: September 23, 1948 (age 77) Douglass, Kansas, U.S.
- Party: Republican
- Spouse: Sondra
- Children: 2
- Education: Pittsburg State University (BS)

Larry Alley (born September 23, 1948) is an American politician who has served in the Kansas Senate from the 32nd district since 2017. Following the removal on April 9, 2021 of Gene Suellentrop from the office of Majority Leader, Alley, who was the Republican Assistant Leader, succeeded him in an acting capacity.

== Early life ==
Alley received a BSIT degree from Kansas State College of Pittsburg. He is the former CEO of Eastside Development, in Winfield, Kansas, and a former project manager for Spirit Aerosystems in Wichita, Kansas.

== Political career ==
In 2014, Alley ran as a Republican for state representative of the 79th district (in south-central Kansas, including most of Sumner and Cowley counties), barely winning in initial vote counts, but ultimately lost to incumbent Democrat Ed Trimmer by 17 votes. In 2017, he ran as for state senator of the 79th district (in far-south-central Kansas, including Barber, Comanche, Harper, and Sumner counties, and parts of Sedgwick, Kingman and Cowley counties) and won.

Alley served as Senate Assistant Majority Leader in 2021. In April 2021, he was suddenly elevated to Acting Senate Majority Leader, immediately following the arrest of Senate Majority Leader Gene Suellentrop (on drunk-driving and resisting arrest charges). Rather than Suellentrop resigning his caucus position, Senate President Ty Masterson had said most of Suellentrop's duties would be temporarily assigned to Alley, in the words of Suellentrop, "...until matters that I am currently dealing with are resolved." The Republican caucus elected Alley permanent majority leader at the end of the 2021 legislative session. Alley indicated his priority was focused on redistricting.

In 2024, Alley declared intent to run for re-election.

=== Leadership and committees ===
Alley continued as Senate Majority Leader after his re-election in the 2022 general election. He chaired the confirmation committee and the executive committee on ways and means. He is vice-chair of the 2024 joint committee on state-tribal relations and was vice-chair of the 2021 special committee on liquor law modernization. He has been chairman of the Senate's committee on federal and state affairs, and a vice chair of its education committee

Kansas Senate
Preceded by Gene Suellentrop	Majority Leader of the Kansas Senate; 2021–2025	Succeeded by Chase Blasi
