= Richard Rock (Kansas politician) =

American politician

Member of the Kansas Senate from the 32nd district
- In office 1989–1996
- Preceded by: Joe Warren
- Succeeded by: Greta Goodwin

Member of the Kansas House of Representatives from the 50th district
- In office 1957–1960

Personal details
- Born: September 27, 1924 Wichita Falls, Texas, U.S.
- Died: February 17, 2013 (aged 88) Tulsa, Oklahoma, U.S.
- Party: Democratic
- Spouse: Rosalee Rock
- Children: 4, including Rand Rock

Richard Rand Rock (September 27, 1924 – February 17, 2013) was an American politician who served as a Democrat in the Kansas State Senate and Kansas House of Representatives.

Born in Texas, Rock graduated from high school in Oklahoma in 1942 and joined the U.S. Navy's flying cadets program. He was discharged from the military after several years of service and attended Oklahoma A&M (since renamed to Oklahoma State University) before transferring to Washburn University in Kansas, where he graduated and also attended law school, graduating in 1950. He worked in labor law and was director of personnel for a meatpacking company. In addition, he founded his own law firm in 1955.

Rock's first elected office was serving as a city judge in Arkansas City, Kansas. In 1956, he was elected to the Kansas House, where he served two terms, from 1957 to 1960. After leaving the House, Rock owned several meatpacking plants as well as owning and managing a string of Residence Inn franchises, operating a cable television station, and other business ventures.

Many years later, he re-entered politics, serving in the State Senate for an additional two terms from 1989 to 1996. He served on the Ways and Means Committee during his time in the Senate.

Rock married his wife Rosalee, whom he met at college in Oklahoma; the couple were married until his death, and had four children, one of whom (Rand Rock) followed his father into the Kansas House of Representatives.

Rock died in Tulsa, Oklahoma in 2013.
