= David Miller (Kansas politician) =

American politician

59th Chairman of the Kansas Republican Party
- In office January 1995 – May 7, 1998
- Preceded by: Kim Wells
- Succeeded by: Steve Abrams

Personal details
- Born: 1949 (age 76–77)
- Spouse: Marjorie Miller
- Education: Washburn University; University of Missouri–Kansas City J.D.
- Occupation: Lawyer

David Miller is an American politician from Eudora, Kansas who served as the 59th Chairman of the Kansas Republican Party and unsuccessfully ran for governor in 1998.

== Early life ==
Miller as born in Kansas City, Kansas in 1949 but moved to Eudora in 1951 and graduated from Eudora High School in 1967. Miller graduated from Washburn University as part of their class of 2000 with a degree in History and Political Science. However, he worked as a paralegal to a financial firm in 1997 sparking his interest in a career in law. In 2004 he worked as a paralegal for a law firm and attended the University of Missouri–Kansas City in pursuit of a J.D. starting in 2012 and graduating in 2015 and was accepted to the Kansas bar.

== Political career ==
=== Kansas Republican chairman ===
Miller was elected the Chairman of the Kansas Republican party in January 1995. During his time as chairman he sought to mitigate the influence and power of the party's moderate wing by seeking to replace all the party's moderates with social conservatives. He would resign May 7, 1998 to challenge incumbent Republican governor Bill Graves in the primary.

=== 1998 gubernatorial election ===
Miller has been a member of various Christian groups in Kansas including the Mustard Seed Christian Fellowship, he served as Director of the Kansans For Life Political Action Committee from 1991 to 1995 and was Chairman of the Christian Coalition of Kansas from 1994 to 1996. The election was seen as part of a larger nationwide battle between moderates and conservatives if the focus of the Republican party should be economic issues or social issues. The race was also noted as Graves was one of the most popular Republican governors in the country and was being challenged by his state's Republican party. Both Graves and Miller campaigned heavily in the state's suburbs seeking to win over the mostly white, religious and middle class demographic backbone of the Kansas Republican party. With Graves focusing on the state's growing economy under his tenure, with Miller focusing on his lack of support on conservative social issues. Graves would handily defeat Miller 72.8% to 27.2% His defeat would see a massive statewide resurgence of the moderate wing of the Kansas Republican party.

== Personal life ==
In 2020 he opened his own law firm in Topeka specializing in Criminal Law, Religious Liberty Issues, Estate Planning and Probate. He is a member of the National Republican Lawyers Association. David is married to Marjorie Miller and is a Methodist.

== Election results ==
1998 Kansas gubernatorial election Republican primary results.
Party	Candidate	Votes	%
Republican	Bill Graves (inc.)	225,782	72.80
Republican	David Miller	84,368	27.20
Total votes		310,150	100.00

Party political offices
Preceded by Kim Wells	Chairman of the Kansas Republican Party; 1995–1997	Succeeded by Steve Abrams
