= J.C. Moore (politician) =

American politician

Member of the Kansas House of Representatives from the 93rd district
- In office 2019–2020
- Preceded by: John R. Whitmer
- Succeeded by: Brian Bergkamp

Personal details
- Party: Republican

Jesse C. "J.C." Moore is an American politician who served one term in the Kansas House of Representatives as a Republican from the 93rd district during 2019 and 2020.

Moore was initially elected in 2018; he narrowly defeated fellow Republican John Whitmer in the primary election, 51% to 49%, and faced an easier race in the general election, triumphing by a 70-30 margin over Democrat Clifton Beck. In 2020, he was defeated soundly in the primary by Brian Bergkamp, who went on to succeed him as representative.
