= Cyndi Howerton =

American politician

Member of the Kansas House of Representatives from the 98th district
- Incumbent
- Assumed office August 25, 2021
- Preceded by: Ron Howard

Personal details
- Party: Republican
- Spouse: Con Howerton
- Children: 4

Cyndi Howerton is an American politician serving as a member of the Kansas House of Representatives from the 98th district. She was appointed on August 25, 2021.

== Career ==
Outside of politics, Howerton works as a tax service manager. She was the Republican nominee for the 86th district of the Kansas House of Representatives in 2020, losing to Stephanie Byers. In August 2021, Howerton was appointed to the Kansas House by members of the Sedgwick County Republican Party to fill the seat left vacant after Ron Howard's death.

== Personal life ==
Howerton is married to Con Howerton, a pastor and veteran of the United States Air Force who served in the Gulf War. They have four children.
