= Steve Anthimides =

American politician

Member of the Kansas House of Representatives from the 98th district
- In office 2013–2016
- Preceded by: Phil Hermanson
- Succeeded by: Steven Crum

Personal details
- Born: January 17, 1977
- Party: Republican

Steven Anthimides (born January 17, 1977) is an American politician who served as a Republican in the Kansas House of Representatives from 2013 until his term expired in January 2017. He replaced fellow Republican Phil Hermanson, who resigned his seat in October 2013 after several controversies, and was re-elected in 2014. In 2016, Anthimides was defeated for re-election by Democrat Steven Crum.
