= Jason Watkins (politician) =

American politician

Member of the Kansas House of Representatives from the 105th district
- In office January 10, 2005 – December 13, 2009
- Preceded by: Jeff Goering
- Succeeded by: Gene Suellentrop

Personal details
- Born: June 23, 1972 (age 54) Salina, Kansas, U.S.
- Party: Republican
- Spouse: Kelly
- Children: 4

Jason Watkins (June 23, 1972) is a registered Lobbyist in the State of Kansas representing the Chamber of Commerce for Wichita, Kansas. He resigned his position representing the 105th Kansas District during the middle of his third term in December 2009.

Watkins was a Republican member of the Kansas House of Representatives, representing the 105th district. He served from 2005 to 2009.

== Committee membership ==
- Appropriations (Vice-Chair)
- General Government Budget (Chair)
- Judiciary

== Major donors ==
The top 5 donors to Watkin's 2008 campaign:

- 1. Kansas Assoc of Realtors $1,000
- 2. Kansas Bankers Assoc $1,000
- 3. Associated General Contractors $800
- 4. Kansas Medical Society $750
- 5. Kansas Livestock Assoc $750
