= Rand Rock =

American politician

Member of the Kansas House of Representatives from the 79th district
- In office 1991–1994

Personal details
- Born: February 28, 1949
- Died: February 6, 2013 (aged 63) Las Vegas, Nevada
- Party: Democratic
- Spouse: Katy Rock
- Children: Yes
- Parent: Richard Rock (father)

Richard Rand Rock II (February 28, 1949–February 6, 2013) was an American politician who served as a Democrat in the Kansas House of Representatives during the early 1990s.

Rock was born in 1949 to Richard Rock and his wife Rosalee; his father would go on to serve in the Kansas state legislature. Rand Rock served in the U.S. Army during the Vietnam War from 1969 to 1972. After returning to Kansas, he worked as an attorney and in law enforcement, serving as a police officer in Lawrence, Kansas from 1973 to 1980; as a U.S. Marshall in Kansas from 1994 to 2002; and working for the U.S. Department of Homeland Security.

Rock won election to the Kansas House of Representatives in 1990, taking office in January 1991. He ultimately served two terms in the House, and died in Las Vegas in 2013.
