= Dick Kelsey (politician) =

American politician (born 1946)

Member of the Kansas Senate from the 26th district
- In office January 12, 2009 – January 14, 2013
- Preceded by: Phillip Journey
- Succeeded by: Dan Kerschen

Member of the Kansas House of Representatives from the 93rd district
- In office January 10, 2005 – January 12, 2009
- Preceded by: Daniel Thimesch
- Succeeded by: Dan Kerschen

Personal details
- Born: December 30, 1946 (age 79) Camden, New Jersey, U.S.
- Party: Republican
- Spouse: Doris Kelsey
- Children: 6
- Education: Hyles Anderson College (MA); Fort Wayne Bible College (BA)

Dick Kelsey (born December 30, 1946) is a former Republican member of the Kansas Senate, representing the 26th district from 2009 until 2013. He was previously a Kansas Representative elected in 2005.

Kelsey was a candidate for the United States House of Representatives in Kansas's 4th congressional district to succeed fellow Republican Todd Tiahrt. He suspended his campaign on March 5, 2010 due to health concerns of his wife. Kelsey endorsed Mike Pompeo to replace Tiahrt on March 17, 2010.

== Issue positions ==
Sen. Kelsey's issue positions and what he supports, according to his website:

- Budget transparency
- Less government spending
- Tax decreases- including the prevention of higher taxes by signing the Taxpayer Protection Pledge
- Funds for maintaining and improving the public schools
- Making abortion illegal
- Tougher penalties for crime
- Affordable health care and putting "Kansans in charge of their health care dollars."
- Enforcing immigration laws; penalties for illegal immigrants
- Business growth and private sector job growth

== Committee assignments ==
Sen. Kelsey serves on these legislative committees:

- Commerce
- Joint Committee on Corrections and Juvenile Justice Oversight
- Financial Institutions and Insurance
- Public Health and Welfare

== Sponsored legislation ==
Legislation sponsored or co-sponsored by Sen. Kelsey includes:

- An act repealing the Kansas insurance score act
- A resolution regarding the right to bear arms
- An amendment to have supreme court justices' appointments subject to consent of the Senate.
- A proposition to create a budget stabilization fund

== Major donors ==
Some of the top contributors to Sen. Kelsey's 2008 campaign, according to the National Institute on Money in State Politics:

Kansas Republican Senatorial Committee, Koch Industries, Kansas Association of Realtors, Restore America PAC Inc., Kansas Medical Society PAC. His total funds raised were $44,000.

His opponent was Pam Frieden who raised $39,000. Her major contributors included the Kansas NEA, Zollerlutzweinbarager LLC, and the Wichita-Hutchinson Labor Federation.
