= Steve Abrams =

American politician (born 1949)

Member of the Kansas Senate from the 32nd district
- In office January 12, 2009 – January 9, 2017
- Preceded by: Greta Goodwin
- Succeeded by: Larry Alley

Chairman of the Kansas Republican Party
- In office May 1998 – January 1999
- Preceded by: David Miller
- Succeeded by: Mark Parkinson

Personal details
- Born: September 4, 1949 (age 76) Arkansas City, Kansas, U.S.
- Party: Republican
- Spouse: Susan
- Children: 4
- Education: Kansas State University

Steve Abrams (born September 4, 1949) is an American politician who served as the Kansas State Senator from the 32nd district from 2009 until 2017. He previously served as chairman the Kansas Republican Party from 1998 to 1999.

A former member of the Board of Education for Unified School District 470 in Arkansas City, Kansas, he was elected as a member of the Kansas State Board of Education in 1995, representing District 10. He served as chairman for the Kansas State Board of Education from 2005 to 2007. In 2009, he became the Kansas State Senator for District 32. Reelected without Democratic opposition in 2012, by narrowly winning the Republican primary over Miranda Allen by 461 votes, he chose not to run for reelection in 2016. He was replaced by Larry Alley, who had lost House District 78 races to Democrat Ed Trimmer in 2012 as an Independent, as well as narrowly in 2014 as a Republican. The conservative Americans for Prosperity, Kansas Chapter, gave him a 100% evaluation on spending, budget and taxes in 2010.

== Biographical information ==
Abrams was born in and is a resident of Arkansas City, Kansas. He is married. He has a Doctor of Veterinary Medicine from Kansas State University and has been a veterinarian since 1978.

== Religious beliefs ==
Abrams believes that the Earth is about 10,000 years old. Abrams also believes that the biblical account of Genesis is factually literal and in the historicity of the Old and New Testaments. He supports the anti-evolutionist Creationist and Intelligent Design views of man's origins.

Abrams is also a member of the Family Life Services anti-abortion "Crisis pregnancy center", in Arkansas City, Kansas.

== Gun ownership issues ==
Abrams has received an "A" grade from the NRA Political Victory Fund. The highest grade they give is an "A+".

== Committees ==
- Education (chair)
- Assessment and Taxation
- Agriculture

== Kansas State Board of Education ==
While serving as chairman of the Kansas State Board of Education in 2005, Abrams supported the adoption of standards that would bring into question the theory of evolution, the preferred one being Creation or "Intelligent Design". His tenure included the hiring of controversial Education Commissioner Bob Corkins, a former Koch think tank director whom the Topeka Capital Journal noted "didn't bring...any education credentials whatsoever," to the position. Republican state Sen. John Vratil, characterized Corkins' hiring as education commissioner as "sort of like making Saddam Hussein president of the United States." The executive director of the American Association of School Administrators, Paul Houston, had written a letter referring to Corkins as an "amateur."

== Political campaign financing ==
During the Kansas State Senate election campaign of 2008, the Abrams Campaign collected a total of $42,191. His Democratic (incumbent) opponent Winfield's Greta Goodwin, lost the race despite having campaign funds of $78,528.

Some of the top contributors to Abrams's 2008 campaign included the Kansas Republican Senatorial Committee, the Fourth (Congressional) District Republican Committee, the Kansas Republican Party and the NRA Political Victory Fund. Koch Industries was a supporter of Abrams. Koch Industries donated $2,000, the maximum that was legally allowed at the time from an individual, company or organization. Political parties are able to donate larger amounts to their own candidates. Koch Industries also donated to the Kansas Republican Senatorial Committee and the Kansas Republican Party which in turn donated to the Abrams campaign.

Party political offices
Preceded by David Miller	Chairman of the Kansas Republican Party; 1997–1998	Succeeded by Mark Parkinson
