= Dwayne Prescott =

American politician

Member of the Maine House of Representatives from the 17th district
- In office December 3, 2014 – December 7, 2022
- Succeeded by: Ronald B. Russell

Personal details
- Born: Chicopee, Massachusetts
- Occupation: School Bus Driver

Dwayne W. Prescott is an American politician. He is a Republican politician representing District 17 in the Maine House of Representatives.

== Political career ==
In 2014, Prescott ran for election to represent District 17 in the Maine House of Representatives. He defeated write-in candidate David Woodsome in the Republican primary, and the winner of the Democratic primary withdrew from the race, leaving Prescott unopposed in the general election. In 2016, Prescott defeated Democratic challenger Gerry Gibson, and in 2018 the winner of the Democratic primary (this time David Buck) again withdrew before the general election. Prescott is running for re-election again in 2020.

As of October 2020, Prescott sits on the following committees:

- Health Coverage, Insurance and Financial Services (Ranking Member)
- Bills in the Second Reading
- Engrossed Bills

=== Electoral record ===
2014 Republican primary: Maine House of Representatives, District 17
Party	Candidate	Votes	%
Republican	Dwayne Prescott	156	52.7%
Republican	David Woodsome (write-in)	140	47.3%

Prescott was unopposed in the 2014 general election, because Democrat Elaine Plourde withdrew.

Prescott was unopposed in the 2016 Republican primary.

2016 general election: Maine House of Representatives, District 17
Party	Candidate	Votes	%
Republican	Dwayne Prescott	2,766	57.8%
Democratic	Gerry Gibson	1,757	36.7%
	Blank	264	5.5%

In 2018, Prescott was unopposed in the Republican primary, and also unopposed in the general election, because Democrat David Buck withdrew.
