= Pamela Price (New Hampshire politician) =

American politician

Member of New Hampshire House of Representatives for Hillsborough 26
- In office 2002–2010

Personal details
- Party: Republican

Pamela G. "Pam" Price is an American politician. She was a member of the New Hampshire House of Representatives and represented Hillsborough 26th district from 2002 to 2010. She endorsed the Marco Rubio 2016 presidential campaign.
