= Mark Hutton (politician) =

American politician

Member of the Kansas House of Representatives from the 105th district
- In office January 14, 2013 – January 10, 2017
- Preceded by: Gene Suellentrop
- Succeeded by: Brenda Landwehr

Personal details
- Born: Mark E. Hutton; August 5, 1954 (age 71) Wichita, Kansas, U.S.
- Party: Republican
- Spouse: Mary
- Children: 2
- Education: Kansas State University (BS)

Mark E. Hutton (born August 5, 1954) is an American politician. He served as a Republican member for the 105th district in the Kansas House of Representatives from 2013 to 2017. In 2016, he was given a lifetime rating of 88% by the American Conservative Union. He is married with two children. He was appointed to the Kansas Board of Regents by Gov. Jeff Colyer in 2018 for a four-year term.
