= Nancey Harrington =

American former politician

Member of the Kansas Senate from the 26th district
- In office 1995–2003
- Preceded by: Todd Tiahrt
- Succeeded by: Phillip Journey

Personal details
- Born: November 8, 1953 (age 72) Waynesboro, Pennsylvania, U.S.
- Party: Republican

Nancey D. Harrington (born November 8, 1953) is an American former politician.

Harrington was born in Waynesboro, Pennsylvania. She was appointed to the Kansas Senate's 26th district in December 1994, following the resignation of Todd Tiahrt. She won two elections in her own right as a Republican candidate in 1996 and 2000, and resigned her office in 2003.
