= Job Tate =

American politician

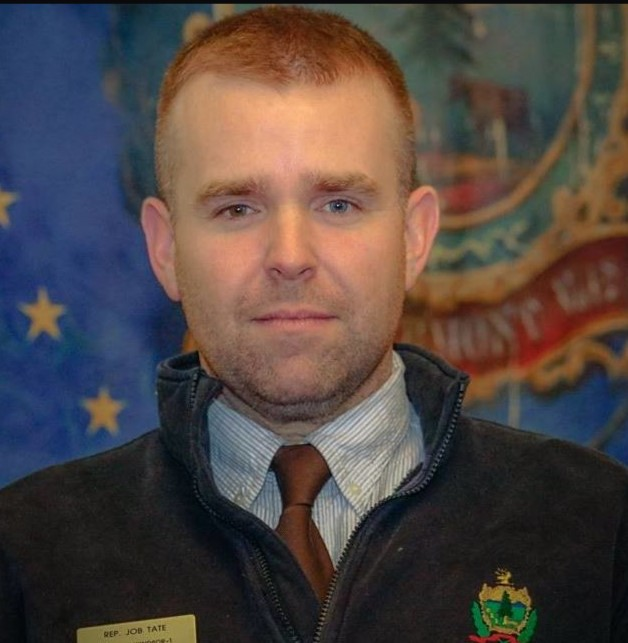

Member of the Vermont House of Representatives from the Rutland-Windsor 1 district
- In office January 2015 – March 31, 2017
- Preceded by: Dennis Devereux
- Succeeded by: Logan Nicoll

Personal details
- Born: December 12, 1979 (age 46) Chillum, Maryland, U.S.
- Party: Republican
- Spouse: Lisa Tate
- Children: 2
- Education: Houghton College (BA)
- Occupation: Politician, Naval Reservist

Military service
- Years of service: 2002–present (U.S. Navy)
- Rank: Petty Officer
- Unit: Naval Mobile Construction Battalion Two-Seven
- Battles/wars: Operation Iraqi Freedom; Operation Enduring Freedom

Job Tate (born December 12, 1979), is a former Republican two-term Representative in the Vermont House of Representatives from 2015 to 2017. In his second term, Tate served as the ranking member of the House committee on General, Housing and Military Affairs. In 2017, he resigned his seat to serve overseas in the navy.

== Early life ==
Tate was born in Chillum, Maryland. When he was nine years old, his family moved to Vermont, where they had a home for over one hundred years. He attended Houghton College and holds a Bachelor of Arts in Communications (minor in business). While in college, he hosted a radio show and played lacrosse.

== Career ==
=== State Representative ===
Tate was first elected as a representative in the Vermont House of Representatives for Rutland-Windsor 1 in 2014. He led in Killington, Mendon, Bridgewater and Chittenden. In 2017, he won again. On March 31, 2017, he announced that he would be resigning due to deployment.

=== Navy ===
Tate is a veteran of the U.S. Navy Seabees. He is also a reservist who has served with Naval Mobile Construction Battalion Two-Seven. He is a heavy equipment operator, explosives expert, squad leader and combat warfare specialist. He served as a Vermont lawmaker and resigned during the second term, to be deployed with the U.S. Navy Construction Battalions.

== Personal life ==
Tate is married to his wife Lisa. They have two sons and live in Mendon, Vermont.
