= Chase Blasi =

American politician

Majority Leader of the Kansas Senate
- Incumbent
- Assumed office January 10, 2025
- Preceded by: Larry Alley

Member of the Kansas Senate
- Incumbent
- Assumed office January 9, 2023
- Preceded by: Gene Suellentrop
- Constituency: 27th (2023-2025); 26th (2025-)

Personal details
- Born: 1994/1995 (age 31–32)
- Party: Republican
- Spouse: McKenna Blasi
- Education: Newman University (BA)

Chase Blasi (born 1994/1995) is an American politician who is a Republican member of the Kansas State Senate since 2023. He has represented 26th district since 2025 and previously represented the 27th district from 2023 to 2025.

After graduating college, Blasi served as the legislative policy director for the Kansas Department of Revenue, and has been the chief of staff for both former Senate President Susan Wagle, and current Senate President Ty Masterson.

In 2023, Blasi introduced a bill to turn over abortion restrictions to localities.

== Committee assignments ==
- Assessment and Taxation
- Public Health and Welfare
- Federal and State Affairs
- Education

== Personal life ==
Blasi is married to McKenna Blasi. They have two adopted sons, Damian and Desmondand. Blasi is Catholic.

Kansas Senate
Preceded by Larry Alley	Majority Leader of the Kansas Senate; 2025–present	Incumbent
