= Kim Wells (Kansas politician) =

American politician

Kim B. Wells

58th Chairman of the Kansas Republican Party
- In office January 1991 – January 1995
- Preceded by: Rochelle Chronister
- Succeeded by: David Miller

Personal details
- Born: December 15, 1949 (age 76) Garden City, Kansas
- Education: University of Kansas B.A. University of Virginia School of Law J.D.
- Occupation: Lawyer

Kim Wells is an American politician who served as the 58th Chairman of the Kansas Republican Party. He also served Bob Dole's campaign manager in 1988 and a member of his staff during his time in congress.

== Personal life ==
Wells was born in Garden City, Kansas, on December 15, 1949. He received his B.A. from the University of Kansas, graduating in 1971 on the honor roll and as a member of Phi Beta Kappa. He went on to get his J.D. from the University of Virginia School of Law, graduating in 1974 and being admitted to the Missouri bar.

== Political career ==
=== Dole staff ===
Wells claims that he became enamored with Dole and politics as a whole when he met Dole as a 13 year old when he ran for his local Kansas's 1st congressional district in 1962. He volunteered for his campaign in 1974 after he graduated from college, his father was the campaign's chairman. He then worked as a legislative assistant for Dole following his victory. He would be a member of Dole's campaign staff during the 1976 election when he was Gerald Ford's vice presidential nominee. Kim was also a member of the campaign staff during Dole's 1980 bid and would be the campaign manager during Dole's unsuccessful 1988 bid during which he envisioned himself as Dole's press secretary should he have gotten elected. He would take a step back from Dole's campaign staff after 1988 but would continue to serve as the senator's staff attorney. During his time on Dole's staff, Kim came out in support of Ronald Reagan's decision to subsidize wheat farming. When Dole resigned from the Senate to run for president in 1996, Kim's name was floated around as one of the potential candidates to be appointed his successor by governor Bill Graves. State senator Sheila Frahm ended up being selected to fill his seat. During the 1996 campaign Kim again supported Dole, touting his ambition and willingness to be bi-partisan, but also decisiveness in making decisions.

=== Kansas Republican party ===
Wells' focus during his time as the chairman of the Kansas Republican party would be to erase the one seat margin of control that the Kansas Democratic Party held in the Kansas House of Representatives during the 1992 Kansas House of Representatives election. In order to do so he supported candidates that where ideologically in line with the moderate Bob Dole as opposed to the "harsh conservative tone" he felt the party had shifted towards following the 1992 Republican National Convention and the nomination of George H. W. Bush. Following his departure from the chairmanship, Well's endorsement is still sought after as can be seen in the 2010 Secretary of State of Kansas election where he endorsed Elizabeth Ensley's unsuccessful candidacy against Kris Kobach. Kim also supported Nancy Kassebaum and her moderate wing of the state Republican party. Additionally, during the 2016 United States presidential election, Kim was a member of a small camp of Kansas Republicans that didn't support Republican nominee Donald Trump due to his inflammatory rhetoric.

Party political offices
| Preceded by Rochelle Chronister | Chairman of the Kansas Republican Party; 1991–1995 | Succeeded by David Miller |
