= Washington-3-3 Vermont Representative District, 2002–2012 =

American legislative district

Coordinates: 44°13′N 72°36′W

The Washington-3-3 Representative District is a one-member state Representative district in the U.S. state of Vermont. It is one of the 108 one or two member districts into which the state was divided by the redistricting and reapportionment plan developed by the Vermont General Assembly following the 2000 U.S. census. The plan applies to legislatures elected in 2002, 2004, 2006, 2008, and 2010. A new plan will be developed in 2012 following the 2010 United States census.

The Washington-3-3 District includes all of the Washington County town of Berlin and a section of the City of Barre defined as follows:

that portion of the City of Barre bound on the west by the Berlin town line, on the north and south by the Barre Town line, and on the east by a boundary running from the Barre Town northern boundary along the center of Beckley Street, then along the center of Third Street to North Main Street, then along the center of North Main Street to the intersection of Berlin Street, then along the center of Berlin Street to Prospect Street, then along the center of Prospect Street to the Barre Town line.

— Vermont Statutes, Title 17, Chapter 34, Section 1893a

The rest of the City of Barre is in Washington-3-1 and Washington-3-2.

As of the 2000 census, the state as a whole had a population of 608,827. As there are a total of 150 representatives, there were 4,059 residents per representative (or 8,118 residents per two representatives). The one member Washington-3-3 District had a population of 3,799 in that same census, 6.41% below the state average.

== District representative ==
Pat McDonald, Republican

== See also ==
- Members of the Vermont House of Representatives, 2005-2006 session
- Vermont Representative Districts, 2002-2012
