= Rick Roeber =

American politician

Representative Rick Roeber

Member of the Missouri House of Representatives from the 34th district
- In office January 9, 2021 – April 21, 2021
- Preceded by: Rebecca Roeber
- Succeeded by: Kemp Strickler

Personal details
- Born: December 20, 1955 (age 70) Lincoln, Nebraska
- Party: Republican
- Spouses: Michelle Keller (m. 1984; div. 1992); Rebecca Roeber (m. 1997; died 2019)
- Children: 3
- Education: University of Missouri–Kansas City

Rick Roeber (born December 20, 1955) is a former American politician. He was expelled from the Missouri House of Representatives in April 2021, due to an investigation of alleged physical, mental, and sexual abuse of his own children.

== Political career ==
Roeber took office as a Republican in January 2021 to fill the seat in the Missouri House of Representatives which had been held by his wife, Rebecca, who died in 2019. Roeber was unanimously expelled from the House in April 2021 following an investigation into claims of child sexual and physical abuse, which he has denied.

== Child abuse allegations ==
In September 2020, Roeber's children and former spouse accused him of sexual and physical abuse. Following the release of those claims, state legislators requested his withdrawal from the race. He refused, and won the election by 301 votes over Democrat Chris Hager.

After his victory, three of his children wrote to Speaker of the House Rob Vescovo and urged that he prevent Roeber from taking office. Roeber was sworn in on January 9, 2021; however, he was barred from joining the House Republican Caucus. This prevented him from serving on committees or receiving prime office space in the Capitol typically reserved for the majority party. The House Ethics Committee began an investigation into the allegations against Roeber.

In April 2021, Vescovo and Representative Travis Fitzwater, the chair of the Ethics Committee, contacted Jackson County prosecutor Jean Peters Baker expressing concern about Roeber's time with an underage child and the previous allegations made against him. The letter to Peters stated that they were "concerned for the safety of this minor child" and requested she contact law enforcement to ensure the child's security.

Roeber announced his resignation on April 13, 2021. The House unanimously voted to reject his resignation until the Ethics Committee completed its investigation. His resignation letter makes no mention of the abuse allegations, but that he planned to move out-of-state and be closer to extended family.

The Ethics Committee released its report on Roeber's conduct on April 19, 2021. The committee found the allegations credible and stated that Roeber had sexually abused two of his children when they were nine and five years old, had physically and mentally abused his children, and attempted to continue sexually abusing them throughout their childhood. The committee unanimously recommended Roeber be expelled from the House.

He was also accused of cruelty to animals when witnesses alleged he had drowned several puppies.

The House expelled him on April 21, 2021, by a vote of 153–0. Representative Bruce DeGroot said his lone vote of "present" was "out of an abundance of caution due to a potential professional conflict". Roeber was the first legislator in Missouri to be expelled since 1865.

He has denied the allegations. He was reported to the authorities in both 1993 and 2001 for alleged child sexual abuse, but no charges were ever filed.
