= Rebecca Roeber =

American politician (1958–2019)

Member of the Missouri House of Representatives from the 34th district
- In office January 7, 2015 – July 30, 2019
- Preceded by: Jeff Grisamore
- Succeeded by: Rick Roeber

Personal details
- Born: May 25, 1958 Kansas City, Missouri, U.S.
- Died: July 30, 2019 (aged 61) Estes Park, Colorado, U.S.
- Party: Republican
- Spouse: Rick Roeber
- Children: 2
- Profession: Teacher

Rebecca Suzanne Roeber (May 25, 1958 – July 30, 2019) was an American politician. Roeber was born in Kansas City, Kansas. She received her bachelor's degree in education in 1996 from Avila University. Roeber taught in the Raytown School District. She was a member of the Missouri House of Representatives, having served since 2015. She was a member of the Republican Party. Roeber was involved in a serious automobile accident in Syracuse, Missouri, in March 2019. She died on July 30, 2019, while vacationing in Estes Park, Colorado.
