= Kansas's 26th Senate district =

American legislative district

Kansas's 26th State Senate district
Senator
Chase Blasi; R–Garden Plain
- Demographics: 86% White; 1% Black; 6% Hispanic; 2% Asian; 1% Native American; 4% Other
- Population (2018): 73,835

Kansas's 26th Senate district is one of 40 districts in the Kansas Senate. It has been represented by Republican Chase Blasi since 2025.

== Geography ==
District 26 covers the southern and southwestern suburbs of Wichita in Sedgwick County, including some of Wichita proper as well as Haysville, Mulvane, Cheney, Garden Plain, and parts of Derby, Clearwater, and Goddard.

The district is located entirely within Kansas's 4th congressional district, and overlaps with the 81st, 82nd, 93rd, 94th, 97th, 98th, and 101st districts of the Kansas House of Representatives.

== Recent election results ==
=== 2020 ===
2020 Kansas Senate election, District 26
Party	Candidate	Votes	%
Republican	Dan Kerschen (incumbent)	27,540	100
Total votes		27,540	100
Republican hold			

=== 2016 ===
2016 Kansas Senate election, District 26
Primary election
Party	Candidate	Votes	%
Republican	Dan Kerschen (incumbent)	3,913	73.0
Republican	Byron Dunlavy	1,446	27.0
Total votes		5,359	100
General election
Republican	Dan Kerschen (incumbent)	20,274	69.5
Democratic	Benjamin Poteete	8,911	30.5
Total votes		29,185	100
Republican hold			

=== 2012 ===
2012 Kansas Senate election, District 26
Primary election
Party	Candidate	Votes	%
Republican	Dan Kerschen	3,911	57.6
Republican	Dick Kelsey (incumbent)	2,883	42.4
Total votes		6,794	100
General election
Republican	Dan Kerschen	20,593	100
Total votes		20,593	100
Republican hold			

=== Federal and statewide results ===
Year	Office	Results
2020	President	Trump 67.7 – 29.7%
2018	Governor	Kobach 51.4 – 37.1%
2016	President	Trump 68.2 – 24.6%
2012	President	Romney 68.8 – 28.8%
