= Kansas's 32nd Senate district =

American legislative district

Kansas's 32nd State Senate district
Senator
Larry Alley; R–Winfield
- Demographics: 85% White; 2% Black; 8% Hispanic; 1% Asian; 1% Native American; 3% Other
- Population (2018): 67,589

Kansas's 32nd Senate district is one of 40 districts in the Kansas Senate. It has been represented by Republican Larry Alley since 2017, succeeding fellow Republican Steve Abrams.

== Geography ==
District 32 spans much of the state's southern edge, including all of Barber, Comanche, Harper, and Sumner Counties, as well as parts of Cowley, Kingman, and Sedgwick Counties. Communities in the district include Arkansas City, Wellington, Anthony, Medicine Lodge, Belle Plaine, Harper, Kiowa, Coldwater, Conway Springs, Caldwell, Oxford, and part of Winfield.

The district is located entirely within Kansas's 4th congressional district, and overlaps with the 79th, 80th, 82nd, 93rd, 114th, 115th, and 116th districts of the Kansas House of Representatives. It borders the state of Oklahoma.

== Recent election results ==
=== 2020 ===
2020 Kansas Senate election, District 32
Party	Candidate	Votes	%
Republican	Larry Alley (incumbent)	25,327	100
Total votes		25,327	100
Republican hold			

=== 2016 ===
2016 Kansas Senate election, District 32
Party	Candidate	Votes	%
Republican	Larry Alley	16,221	62.2
Democratic	Don Shimkus	9,844	37.8
Total votes		26,065	100
Republican hold			

=== 2012 ===
2012 Kansas Senate election, District 32
Primary election
Party	Candidate	Votes	%
Republican	Steve Abrams (incumbent)	4,886	52.5
Republican	Miranda Allen	4,425	47.5
Total votes		9,311	100
General election
Republican	Steve Abrams (incumbent)	20,981	100
Total votes		20,981	100
Republican hold			

=== Federal and statewide results ===
Year	Office	Results
2020	President	Trump 72.5 – 25.3%
2018	Governor	Kobach 52.6 – 35.9%
2016	President	Trump 70.6 – 23.2%
2012	President	Romney 67.6 – 30.0%
