= Kansas's 27th Senate district =

American legislative district

Kansas's 27th State Senate district
Senator
Joe Claeys; R–Wichita
- Demographics: 84% White; 2% Black; 8% Hispanic; 2% Asian; 2% Other
- Population (2018): 74,577

Kansas's 27th Senate district is one of 40 districts in the Kansas Senate. It has been represented by Republican Joe Claeys since 2025.

== Geography ==
District 27 is based in the western reaches of Wichita in Sedgwick County, also covering some or all of the suburbs of Colwich, Andale, Maize, and Goddard.

The district is located entirely within Kansas's 4th congressional district, and overlaps with the 90th, 91st, 94th, 100th, 101st, and 105th districts of the Kansas House of Representatives.

== Recent election results ==
=== 2020 ===
2020 Kansas Senate election, District 27
Party	Candidate	Votes	%
Republican	Gene Suellentrop (incumbent)	26,296	66.7
Democratic	Mike McCorkle	13,143	33.3
Total votes		39,439	100
Republican hold			

=== 2016 ===
2016 Kansas Senate election, District 27
Primary election
Party	Candidate	Votes	%
Republican	Gene Suellentrop	4,085	50.6
Republican	Lori Graham	3,987	49.4
Total votes		8,072	100
General election
Republican	Gene Suellentrop	22,252	66.5
Democratic	Tony Hunter	11,209	33.5
Total votes		33,461	100
Republican hold			

=== 2012 ===
2012 Kansas Senate election, District 27
Party	Candidate	Votes	%
Republican	Leslie Donovan (incumbent)	20,773	65.5
Democratic	Tony Hunter	10,922	34.5
Total votes		31,695	100
Republican hold			

=== Federal and statewide results ===
Year	Office	Results
2020	President	Trump 62.1 – 35.9%
2018	Governor	Kobach 48.7 – 42.3%
2016	President	Trump 63.9 – 29.9%
2012	President	Romney 68.3 – 29.8%
