= Same-sex marriage in New Hampshire =

Same-sex marriage has been legal in New Hampshire since January 1, 2010, based on legislation signed into law by Governor John Lynch on June 3, 2009. Following much discussion, a same-sex marriage bill was approved 14–10 by the Senate and 198–176 by the House of Representatives in May 2009. The law provided that civil unions, which the state had established on January 1, 2008, would be converted to marriages on January 1, 2011, unless dissolved, annulled, or converted before that date. Efforts to repeal the law were defeated in the House in March 2012. Polling suggests that a large majority of New Hampshire residents support the legal recognition of same-sex marriage, with a 2024 Public Religion Research Institute poll showing that 74% of respondents supported same-sex marriage.

New Hampshire was the fourth state in New England and the fifth in the country, after Massachusetts, Connecticut, Iowa and Vermont, to legalize same-sex marriage. (Note: Excluding California which had constitutionally banned same-sex marriage in November 2008, but still recognized marriages performed between June and November 2008.)

== Civil unions ==
Following the first same-sex marriages in Massachusetts in May 2004, New Hampshire established a 14-member commission to consider the question of civil recognition of same-sex relationships. The group, composed of legislators, politicians and activists, reported its findings in November 2005. By a 7–4 vote, it recommended modifying the Constitution of New Hampshire to restrict marriage to heterosexual unions, reinforcing the state's statutory definition of marriage to prevent the judiciary from finding a constitutional requirement that same-sex couples be allowed to wed. Their report also opposed the idea of civil unions like those recognized in Vermont in July 2000. The commission proposed instead certificates that would guarantee certain rights such as hospital visitation, but no financial benefits. The certificates would be available to siblings, parents and children as well. The commission members who dissented said it had spent too much time hearing attacks on the morality of homosexuality. The chairman, Tony Soltani, a Republican member of the House of Representatives, said; "If we redefined marriage, we'd be tarred and feathered, but if we give them some rights, it will be accepted." He said homosexuality could not be compared to race, because it is an "acquired behavior" or a "combination of both nature and nurture." He added: "I know it's not a long-term solution, but it is something a child can point to and say, my representatives say I'm OK, and I'm not a freak." Following the 2006 general election, in which Democrats became the majority party in the New Hampshire General Court, both Democratic and Republican legislators proposed legislation to grant same-sex couples greater civil rights. The proposals ranged from allowing a couple to enter into a "contractual cohabitation", a "civil union", a "spousal union", or a same-sex marriage. Governor John Lynch opposed same-sex marriage, but indicated that he was receptive to discussing civil unions as a means of granting certain rights to same-sex couples.

In early 2007, the General Court briefly considered a bill authorizing same-sex marriage until Democratic leaders assigned it to a study committee. On April 4, 2007, by a vote of 243 to 129, the House of Representatives passed a civil union bill that gave partners in same-sex civil unions the same "rights, responsibilities and obligations" as heterosexual married couples. Lynch took no public position until April 19, when he said that he would sign legislation establishing civil unions for same-sex couples because he believed "it is a matter of conscience, fairness and preventing discrimination." On April 26, the New Hampshire Senate approved the civil union bill 14–10 on a party line vote. On May 31, Governor Lynch signed the civil union bill into law, making New Hampshire "the first state to embrace same-sex unions without a court order or the threat of one." The law took effect on January 1, 2008. Licenses for civil unions became available on December 10, 2007, allowing civil unions to be formalized in the very early hours of January 1. Deputy Secretary of State David Scanlan said, "As far as we're concerned, everything is on schedule." The first civil unions were formed throughout New Hampshire just after midnight on January 1. The largest gathering occurred on the steps of the State House in Concord. An estimated 40 couples participated as 200-300 friends, family and onlookers observed. The event drew one protester who "quietly handed out a statement calling all sex outside of heterosexual marriage a sin."

Though the civil union law intended to provide "all the rights and ... obligations and responsibilities provided for in state law that apply to parties who are joined together," they actually entailed a more limited set of benefits and limitations. The benefits included:

- Access to medical care information and decision making
- Access to proceedings and information related to the partner's death
- Ability to make funeral arrangements
- Right to be placed in the same room in a nursing home
- Health care coverage under state-regulated family plans
- State pension benefits
- Inheritance without a will
- Ability to transfer property between partners without paying state taxes
- Ability to change names by showing civil union certificate to government agencies, banks, etc. and simply stating a name preference
- Pay or receive alimony and/or child support ordered by a court in a divorce
- Ability to adopt as a stepparent

The limitations associated with civil unions included:

- Legal status only recognized in certain states
- Unclear divorce proceedings should one or both partners move out-of-state
- Unclear whether surviving partner could obtain a death certificate and claim body if the partner's death occurred out-of-state
- Employers governed by federal laws allowed to provide health and other benefits only to heterosexual couples on a tax-free basis, whereas same-sex couples had to pay income taxes on the value of such benefits
- Partners treated as unmarried adults under more than 1,100 federal laws
- Could jeopardize a couple's ability to adopt overseas
- Federal privacy laws could prohibit access to some medical care information without durable power of attorney

Under the New Hampshire civil union law, same-sex civil unions or marriages conducted in other jurisdictions were recognized as civil unions in New Hampshire. In 2008, Representative Maureen Mooney introduced legislation to repeal that portion of the civil union law, but her proposal was deemed inexpedient to legislate, a legislative procedure equivalent to not passing the bill out of committee. By the end of 2008, approximately 600 civil union licenses had been issued by the state, while approximately 8,700 marriage licenses were issued by the state during the same period.

== Same-sex marriage ==
Same-sex marriage in the United States

=== Passage of legislation in 2009 ===
On March 18, 2009, the House Judiciary Committee sent a same-sex marriage bill—sponsored by representatives Jim Splaine, Paul McEachern, Edward Butler and Barbara Richardson—to the floor of the House of Representatives without a recommendation following a tied 10–10 vote. The legislation sought to repeal a statutory ban enacted in 1987 that had made same-sex marriages invalid. This ban was passed a few years before the passage of the federal Defense of Marriage Act (DOMA; French: Loi de défense du mariage), which banned federal recognition of same-sex marriages. On March 26, the House voted 182–183, but after a motion to reconsider the first vote, the measure passed 186–179. On April 23, the Senate Judiciary Committee by a vote of 3–2 recommended that the Senate defeat the bill, but a week later the Senate approved an amended version of the bill 13–11. The amended bill passed the House on May 6, 2009. Governor John Lynch had yet to take a position on the legislation, and had five days to exercise his veto. The bill would recognize out-of-state civil unions as marriages. In addition, couples in civil unions would be able to apply for marriage licenses; however, if they did not apply for licenses their civil unions would be automatically converted into marriages on January 1, 2011.

On May 14, Lynch, though personally opposed to same-sex marriages, said he would sign the bill provided it contained increased protections for churches against lawsuits if they refused to marry same-sex couples. Legislative leaders indicated on the same day that they would allow the changes. On May 20, 2009, the Senate passed the changes 14–10 along party lines, but the House unexpectedly failed to agree later in the day by a vote of 186–188. Opponents in that body tried to kill the bill, but failed 173 to 202. The House then voted 207–168 to ask the Senate to negotiate a compromise. On May 29, the two chambers reached a compromise with some minor changes that Lynch approved. The revised legislation was approved 14–10 by the Senate and 198–176 by the House on June 3, and signed by Governor Lynch shortly thereafter. Lynch was the second governor in the United States to sign a bill legalizing same-sex marriage, the first being John Baldacci of Maine.

June 3, 2009 vote in the House of Representatives
Political affiliation	Voted for	Voted against	Abstained	Absent (Did not vote)
Democratic Party	188: Dennis Abbott; James Aguiar; Peter Allen; Susan Almy; Beth Arsenault; Benjamin Baroody; Michael Bartlett; Roger Beauchamp; Jane Beaulieu; Catriona Beck; Bernard Benn; David Borden; Candace Bouchard; William Brennan; Robert Bridgham; Pennington Brown; Carole Brown; Jennifer Brown; Larry Brown; Brendon Browne; Rachel Burke; Suzanne Butcher; Edward Butler; Tim Butterworth; Jacqueline Cali-Pitts; David Campbell; June Caron; Daniel Carr; Kimberley Casey; Shannon Chandley; Claudia Chase; Alexis Chininis; Claire Clarke; Jane Clemons; John Cloutier; Mary Cooney; David Cote; James Craig; Renny Cushing; James Cyr; Frank Davis; Judith Day; John DeJoie; Rich DiPentima; Baldwin Domingo; Dan Eaton; Michael Farley; Robert Foose; Susan Ford; Linda Foster; Barbara French; Carol Friedrich; Raymond Gagnon; Kenneth Gidge; Mary Stuart Gile; Ruth Ginsburg; Jeffrey Goley; Mary Gorman; Sue Gottling; Franklin Gould; Paul Hackel; Jill Hammond; Laurie Harding; Valerie Hardy; Sandra Harris; Philip Harvey; Suzanne Harvey; William Hatch; Roger Hebert; John Henson; Kevin Hodges; Roland Hofemann; Timothy Horrigan; Charlotte Houde-Quimby; Pamela Hubbard; Gina Hutchinson; Anne-Marie Irwin; William Johnson; Naida Kaen; George Katsiantonis; Sandra Keans; Sally Kelly; Susan Kepner; John Knowles; Mary Ann Knowles; Richard Komi; Angeline Kopka; Suzanne Laliberte; Elaine Lauterborn; Peter Leishman; Alfred Lerandeau; Nickolas Levasseur; Melanie Levesque; Steven Lindsey; Carolyn Lisle; Patrick Long; Melissa Lyons; Ron Mack; Maureen Mann; Seth Marshall; Robert Matheson; Barbara McCarthy; Jim McClammer; Paul McEachern; Patricia McMahon; David Meader; Lucy Mears; Evalyn Merrick; Scott Merrick; Liz Merry; Kate Miller; Bonnie Mitchell; Marcia Moody; Catherine Mulholland; David Nixon; Susi Nord; Sharon Nordgren; Michael O'Brien; Jessie Osborn; Derek Owen; Laura Pantelakos; Henry Parkhurst; Beatriz Pastor; Robert Perry; Don Petterson; David Pierce; Margaret Porter; Frances Potter; Brian Poznanski; Philip Preston; Peter Ramsey; Robin Read; Judith Reever; Chip Rice; Barbara Richardson; Gary Richardson; Kris Roberts; Timothy Robertson; Beth Rodd; Rose Marie Rogers; Deanna Rollo; Michael Rollo; Cindy Rosenwald; Emma Rous; Joseph Russell; Trinka Russell; Mark Ryder; Tara Sad; Donna Schlachman; Peter Schmidt; Dianne Schuett; Joan Schulze; Gilman Shattuck; Barbara Shaw; Steve Shurtleff; Carla Skinder; Marjorie Smith; Suzanne Smith; Judith Spang; Jim Splaine; William Stetson; Richard Stuart; Cynthia Sweeney; Kathleen Taylor; Yvonne Thomas; Robert Thompson; Joy Tilton; Charles Townsend; Frank Tupper; Dennis Vachon; Janet Wall; Mary Jane Wallner; Robert Walsh; Mary Beth Walz; Kenneth Ward; Rick Watrous; David Watters; Leigh Webb; Carolyn Webber; Lucy Weber; Charles Weed; Deborah Wheeler; Andrew White; Susan Wiley; Carol Williams; Robert Williams; Joel Winters; Charles Yeaton	16: Roger Berube; Ronald Boisvert; Thomas Buco; William Butynski; Stephen DeStefano; Thomas Donovan; Doreen Howard; Paul Ingersoll; John Kelley; Roland LaPlante; Robert Lewis; Lori Movsesian; James O'Neil; Maurice Pilotte; Herbert Richardson; Kimberly Shaw	4: Robert Haley; Anthony Matarazzo; Terie Norelli; Mark Preston	15: Delmar Burridge; Nancy Carlson; Joan Flurey; Patrick Garrity; Anne Grassie; Christine Hamm; Sarah Hutz; Jean Jeudy; Thomas Katsiantonis; Susan Price; Brian Rhodes; Ted Rokas; Timothy Soucy; Dale Sprague; Daniel Sullivan
Republican Party	10: Peter Bergin; Anthony DiFruscia; Cynthia Dokmo; John Gleason; Kenneth Gould; Priscilla Lockwood; Irene Messier; Alida Millham; Robert Theberge; Steve Vaillancourt	159: Christopher Ahlgren; Mary Allen; Eric Anderson; Clinton Bailey; Al Baldasaro; David Bates; Peter Batula; Ronald Belanger; William Belvin; David Bettencourt; David Bickford; Franklin Bishop; Ralph Boehm; Peter Bolster; David Boutin; Laurie Boyce; Russell Bridle; Julie Brown; Lyle Bulis; Frank Case; John Cebrowski; Gene Chandler; Gene Charron; Chris Christensen; Lars Christiansen; Jennifer Coffey; Timothy Comerford; Margaret Crisler; Gary Daniels; Russell Day; Debra DeSimone; James Devine; Shaun Doherty; Patricia Dowling; Richard Drisko; Dudley Dumaine; Nancy Elliott; Robert Elliott; Susan Emerson; Larry Emerton; Frank Emiro; Beverly Ferrante; Robert Fesh; Donald Flanders; John Flanders; Joseph Fleck; Larry Gagne; Laura Gandia; Marilinda Garcia; Carolyn Gargasz; James Garrity; Edmond Gionet; John Graham; Mary Griffin; Warren Groen; Robert Haefner; Joseph Hagan; Kenneth Hawkins; James Headd; David Hess; John Hikel; Richard Hinch; Peyton Hinkle; Kathleen Hoelzel; Edith Hogan; Frank Holden; Rip Holden; Gary Hopper; Thomas Howard; John Hunt; Karen Hutchinson; William Infantine; Paul Ingbretson; Russell Ingram; Robert Introne; Daniel Itse; Shawn Jasper; Jane Johnson; Lawrence Kappler; George Katsakiores; Phyllis Katsakiores; David Kidder; David Knox; Walter Kolodziej; Frank Kotowski; Neal Kurk; Bob L'Heureux; Rick Ladd; John Laurent; Norman Major; Margie Maybeck; Michael McCarthy; Mark McConkey; Carol McGuire; Betsy McKinney; Charles McMahon; Robert Mead; Edward Moran; Stephen Nedeau; Chris Nevins; William O'Brien; Lynne Ober; Russell Ober; Joe Osgood; Sherman Packard; David Palfrey; Stephen Palmer; Betsey Patten; Anthony Pellegrino; Leo Pepino; Amy Perkins; Lawrence Perkins; Andrew Peterson; James Pilliod; Calvin Pratt; Pamela Price; Anne Priestley; Matt Quandt; Laurence Rappaport; James Rausch; John Reagan; Dennis Reed; William Remick; Andrew Renzullo; John Roberts; Beverly Rodeschin; Ronald Rowe; David Russell; Donald Ryder; Frank Sapareto; Dino Scala; Stella Scamman; Doug Scamman Jr.; John Sedensky; Carl Siedel; Pete Silva; Todd Smith; William Smith; Connie Soucy; Jayne Spaulding; Jeffrey St. Cyr; Franklin Sterling; Stanley Stevens; Nancy Stiles; James Sullivan; Elaine Swinford; Saghir Tahir; Pamela Tucker; James Twombly; Jordan Ulery; Karen Umberger; John Veazey; Moe Villeneuve; Carol Vita; Brien Ward; Everett Weare; David Welch; Robert Willette; Burton Williams	–	6: Dennis Fields; Anthony Maiola; Elisabeth Sanders; Don Van Patten; Roger Wells; Fran Wendelboe
Independent	–	1: Eric Stohl	–	–
Total	198	176	4	21
Total	49.6%	44.1%	1.0%	5.3%

June 3, 2009 vote in the Senate
Political affiliation	Voted for	Voted against	Abstained	Absent (Did not vote)
Democratic Party	14: Jackie Cilley; Lou D'Allesandro; Betsi DeVries; Martha Fuller Clark; Peggy Gilmour; Maggie Hassan; Matthew Houde; Harold Janeway; Molly Kelly; Sylvia Larsen; Bette Lasky; Amanda Merrill; Deborah Reynolds; Kathleen Sgambati	–	–	–
Republican Party	–	10: John Barnes Jr.; Jeb Bradley; Peter Bragdon; Sharon Carson; Michael Downing; John Gallus; Ted Gatsas; Robert Letourneau; Bob Odell; Sheila Roberge	–	–
Total	14	10	0	0
Total	58.3%	41.7%	0.0%	0.0%

Same-sex couples began marrying across New Hampshire on January 1, 2010, with several couples exchanging vows in front of the New Hampshire State House in Concord. The definition of marriage in New Hampshire became:

Marriage is the legally recognized union of 2 people. Any person who otherwise meets the eligibility requirements of this chapter may marry any other eligible person regardless of gender. Each party to a marriage shall be designated "bride", "groom", or "spouse". [RSA § 457:1-a]

From January 1, 2010, no new civil unions are established in the state. Parties to a valid civil union established before that date were able to have their marriages solemnized, provided they met the legal requirements of the state marriage laws. Additionally, such persons in civil unions established before January 1, 2010 were able to record their civil unions with the town or city clerk who recorded the civil union and receive a marriage license, with no additional fee or solemnization required. A civil union entered into before January 1, 2010, that had not been dissolved, annulled, or transformed into a marriage, was automatically converted to a marriage on January 1, 2011.

=== Repeal efforts ===
In 2010, the General Court considered two repeal proposals, a bill to repeal both the same-sex marriage law and the state's 2007 civil union law and a constitutional amendment to ban same-sex marriage. The House defeated both of them on February 17, 2010.

On October 25, 2011, the House Judiciary Committee voted 11–6 for a bill repealing same-sex marriage and establishing civil unions far more limited than the state's earlier civil unions. The new civil unions would not be covered by the state's anti-discrimination law and no one would be required to recognize them as the equivalent of opposite-sex marriages. The bill's effect on same-sex marriages already performed in the state was disputed. In January 2012, Representative David Bates, the principal sponsor of the legislation, said the bill would be the first legislative repeal of same-sex marriage in the United States, but Governor John Lynch announced he would veto any repeal of the state's same-sex marriage statute. New Hampshire Republicans were generally identified with the repeal effort and they controlled the 400-member House by a 3–1 margin. The House defeated a series of attempts to modify the bill to attract moderate support by providing same-sex couples with an alternative to marriage. Bates' own amendment to delay the bill's effective date until March 31 so a non-binding referendum on the issue of same-sex marriage could be held in November failed on a vote of 162–188, with 96 of the chamber's 293 Republicans voting against the referendum. Opposing the referendum, Representative Shawn Jasper, the House Deputy Majority Leader, said: "We are the most representative body in the country, if not the world. If we feel the need to go to our constituents and ask them a question, we are clearly in trouble." On March 21, 2012, the House defeated the bill on a vote of 116 to 211. The Nashua Telegraph termed the failure of the repeal effort "a shocking setback". Subsequently, Democrat Maggie Hassan, a supporter of same-sex marriage, won the 2012 gubernatorial election, and Democrats took control of the House. Since then, lawmakers have not introduced any bills to repeal same-sex marriage.

March 21, 2012 vote in the House of Representatives
Political affiliation	Voted for	Voted against	Abstained	Absent (Did not vote)
Republican Party	115: Donald Andolina; Michael Balboni; Alfred Baldasaro; Richard Barry; David Bates; James Belanger; William Belvin; Jerry Bergevin; Ralph Boehm; Spec Bowers; Randall Brownrigg; Lyle Bulis; John Burt; Michael Buxton; Anne Cartwright; Sam Cataldo; John Cebrowski; Brian Chirichiello; Tim Comerford; Guy Comtois; William Condra; Gary Daniels; Joshua Davenport; Susan DeLemus; Patricia Dowling; Joe Duarte; Robert Elliott; Bob Fesh; Dennis Fields; Jack Flanagan; Donald Flanders; Joseph Fleck; Larry Gagne; Laura Gandia; Marilinda Garcia; James Garrity; Edmond Gionet; Bob Giuda; Carlos Gonzalez; Robert Greemore; Mary Griffin; Warren Groen; Peter Hansen; Harry Hardwick; J.R. Hoell; Edith Hogan; Thomas Howard; John Hunt; Paul Ingbretson; Robert Introne; Dan Itse; Kevin Janvrin; Jane Johnson; Kyle Jones; Laura Jones; Lawrence Kappler; Robert Kingsbury; Walter Kolodziej; Joseph Krasucki; Paul LaCasse Sr.; Kirsten Larsen; Tom Laware; Mark Lindsley; Donna Mauro; Mark McConkey; Sean McGuinness; Carol McGuire; Holly Mecheski; Paul Mirski; Charles Moore; Edward Moran Jr.; Jeanine Notter; William O'Brien; William O'Connor; Bill Ohm; Jeffrey Oligny; Philip Osgood; Sherman Packard; Stephen Palmer; James Parison; Anthony Pellegrino; Leo Pepino; Lawrence Perkins Jr.; Laurie Pettengill; James Pilliod; Joseph Pitre; Laurence Rappaport; Kevin Reichard; Glenn Ritter; Beverly Rodeschin; John Sedensky; Carl Seidel; Wyman Shuler; Peter Silva; Tyler Simpson; Molly Smith; Todd Smith; William Smith; Tony Soltani; Charles Sova; Stephen Stepanek; Kathleen Stroud; Joseph Thomas; Franklin Tilton; Norman Tregenza; Marc Tremblay; Stella Tremblay; Timothy Twombly; Jordan Ulery; Moe Villeneuve; Lucien Vita; Joanne Ward; James Webb; Kenneth Weyler; Colman Worsman	120: Christopher Ahlgren; Mary Allen; Gary Azarian; David Babson Jr.; Michael Ball; Ronald Belanger; David Bettencourt; Peter Bolster; Lester Bradley; Julie Brown; Kevin Brown; Paul Brown; John Byrnes; Gene Chandler; Gene Charron; Chris Christensen; Lars Christiansen; James Coffey; Jennifer Coffey; Seth Cohn; Timothy Copeland; Sean Coughlin; Steven Cunningham; Kathleen Cusson-Cail; Russell Day; Cameron DeJong; James Devine; Daniel Donovan; Richard Dwinell; Stephanie Eaton; Susan Emerson; Larry Emerton; Duane Erickson; Robert Fredette; Carolyn Gargasz; John Graham; Phil Greazzo; Robert Haefner; Joseph Hagan; Ken Hawkins; David Hess; John Hikel; Gregory Hill; Dick Hinch; Kathleen Hoelzel; Timothy Hogan; Winfred Hutchinson; Shawn Jasper; Phyllis Katsakiores; Thomas Keane; Karen Keegan-Hutchinson; David Kidder; David Knox; Kenneth Kreis Sr.; Neal Kurk; Rick Ladd; George Lambert; Don LeBrun; Fred Leonard; Priscilla Lockwood; Charlene Lovett; Bruce MacMahon; Norman Major; Robert Malone; Jonathan Maltz; Frank McCarthy; John McDonnell; Dan McGuire; Harry Merrow; Irene Messier; Alida Millham; Robert Moore Jr.; Brian Murphy; Keith Murphy; Chris Nevins; Clifford Newton; John O'Connor; David Palfrey; William Panek; Robbie Parsons; Betsey Patten; Amy Perkins; Calvin Pratt; Mark Proulx; Michael Reed; Skip Reilly; William Remick; Herbert Richardson; David Robbins; Robert Rowe; David Russell; Laurie Sanborn; Elisabeth Sanders; Marie Sapienza; Stephen Schmidt; Adam Schroadter; Lisa Scontsas; Brian Seaworth; Paul Simard; Tammy Simmons; Edwin Smith; Steven Smith; Franklin Sterling Jr.; James Sullivan; Matthew Swank; Elaine Swinford; John Sytek; Kyle Tasker; Ross Terrio; Robert Theberge; John Tholl; Karen Umberger; Steve Vaillancourt; Carol Vita; James Waddell; Kevin Waterhouse; David Welch; Randall Whitehead; Robert Willette; Steven Winter	21: Harry Accornero; Jason Antosz; Kevin Avard; Lynne Blankenbeker; Duffy Daugherty; William Infantine; Robert Luther; Andrew Manuse; Philip Munck; Barry Palmer; Lenette Peterson; Andrew Renzullo; Fredrick Rice; Jon Richardson; Gregory Sorg; Connie Soucy; Kathleen Souza; James Summers; William Tobin; Mark Warden; Michael Weeden	37: Patrick Abrami; Garry Barry; Thomas Beattie; Regina Birdsell; Charles Brosseau; Frank Case; Norma Champagne; Debra DeSimone; Shaun Doherty; Richard Drisko; Beverly Ferrante; James Headd; Frank Holden; Gary Hopper; Frank Kotowski; Kathleen Lauer-Rago; David Lundgren; Bruce Marcus; Michael McCarthy; Donald McClarren; Betsy McKinney; Charles McMahon; Lynne Ober; Russell Ober; Richard Okerman; Michele Peckham; Marshall Quandt; Matthew Quandt; John Reagan; Dennis Reed; Frank Sapareto; Dino Scala; Jeffrey Shackett; Kenneth Sheffert; Kevin Sullivan; Daniel Tamburello; Pamela Tucker
Democratic Party	1: Roger Berube	91: James Aguiar; Susan Almy; Benjamin Baroody; Bernard Benn; Candace Bouchard; Brendon Browne; William Butynski; Jacqueline Cali-Pitts; David Campbell; Daniel Carr; Cynthia Chase; John Cloutier; Mary Cooney; David Cote; Gary Coulombe; Jennifer Daler; Helen Deloge; Stephen DeStefano; Rich DiPentima; Robert Foose; June Frazer; Raymond Gagnon; Kenneth Gidge; Mary Stuart Gile; John Gimas; Philip Ginsburg; Jeffrey Goley; Mary Gorman; Franklin Gould; Anne Grassie; Christine Hamm; Laurie Harding; William Hatch; Samuel Hawkes; Timothy Horrigan; Gladys Johnsen; Naida Kaen; Sandra Keans; Benjamin Lefebvre; Peter Leishman; Alfred Lerandeau; Nickolas Levasseur; Steven Lindsey; Patrick Long; Patricia Lovejoy; James MacKay; David Meader; Evalyn Merrick; Marcia Moody; Sharon Nordgren; Terie Norelli; Laura Pantelakos; Henry Parkhurst; Beatriz Pastor-Bodmer; Dick Patten; Marsha Pelletier; Robert Perry; David Pierce; Maurice Pilotte; Marjorie Porter; Frances Potter; Robin Read Jr.; Harold Rice; Gary Richardson; Jenna Roberts; Kris Roberts; Theodoros Rokas; Cindy Rosenwald; Tara Sad; Donna Schlachman; Andrew Schmidt; Peter Schmidt; Christopher Serlin; Steve Shurtleff; Suzanne Smith; Dale Spainhower; Judith Spang; Dale Sprague; Daniel Sullivan; Peter Sullivan; Bruce Tatro; Kathleen Taylor; Yvonne Thomas; Charles Townsend; Janet Wall; Rick Watrous; David Watters; Lucy Weber; Charles Weed; Andrew White; Roberts Williams	4: Patrick Garrity; Jean Jeudy; Thomas Katsiantonis; Derek Owen	8: James Cyr; Baldwin Domingo; Roland Hofemann; Dorothea Hooper; Peter Ramsey; Brian Rhodes; Barbara Shaw; Mary Jane Wallner
Total	116	211	25	45
Total	29.2%	53.1%	6.3%	11.3%

=== Later legislation ===
For several years following the legalization of same-sex marriage, state statutes invalidated any marriage contracted in New Hampshire by non-residents if their intended state of residence would not recognize the validity of the marriage. On July 10, 2014, Governor Hassan signed legislation—approved 217–119 by the House and 24–0 by the Senate—designed to clarify the status of same-sex marriages. It established that same-sex marriages from other jurisdictions would be recognized in New Hampshire as valid from the date they were contracted, even if they predated the state's recognition of same-sex marriage. It also provided that New Hampshire would recognize the same-sex marriages of non-residents, regardless of whether their home jurisdiction recognizes such marriages, and that individuals in civil unions from other jurisdictions could marry in New Hampshire without first dissolving their civil union.

In May 2018, the General Court passed legislation establishing a uniform, minimum marriageable age at 16. Previously, same-sex couples could only marry from the age of 18, while heterosexual partners could marry at 13 for women and 14 for men. On June 18, 2018, Governor Chris Sununu signed the bill into law, and it went into effect on January 1, 2019.

In January 2026, Representative Alice Wade introduced legislation to enshrine the right to same-sex marriage in the New Hampshire Constitution. "There are Granite Staters who have reached out to me that have been married for over a decade and don't know how long they'll have that right. I've heard from couples who have already started planning where they'd move to if marriage equality is overturned, leaving New Hampshire, their jobs, and their communities behind just to keep their families intact," said Wade, who introduced the bill after hearing from married same-sex couples who were worried at the U.S. Supreme Court potentially overturning its ruling in Obergefell v. Hodges. Representative Joe Alexander Jr., who is openly gay, questioned whether the bill was necessary: "If there's been no proposals whatsoever of rolling back marriage equality, why would we need this?" The measure was not voted on before adjournment.

=== Economic impact ===
A University of California, Los Angeles study from March 2009 estimated the impact of allowing same-sex couples to marry on New Hampshire's state budget. The study concluded that allowing same-sex couples to marry, as opposed to the old civil union scheme, would result in a net gain of approximately $500,000 each year for the state. This net impact would be the result of savings in expenditures on state means-tested public benefits programs and an increase in meals and room tax revenues from increased wedding-related tourism.

=== Demographics and marriage statistics ===
Data from the 2000 U.S. census showed that 2,703 same-sex couples were living in New Hampshire. By 2005, this had increased to 5,578 couples, likely attributed to same-sex couples' growing willingness to disclose their partnerships on government surveys. Same-sex couples lived in all counties of the state, and constituted 0.9% of coupled households and 0.6% of all households in the state. Most couples lived in Hillsborough, Rockingham and Merrimack counties, but the counties with the highest percentage of same-sex couples were Cheshire (0.63% of all county households) and Belknap (0.61%). Same-sex partners in New Hampshire were on average younger than opposite-sex partners, and more likely to be employed. However, the average and median household incomes of same-sex couples were lower than different-sex couples, and same-sex couples were also far less likely to own a home than opposite-sex partners. 19% of same-sex couples in New Hampshire were raising children under the age of 18, with an estimated 1,614 children living in households headed by same-sex couples in 2005.

By spring 2012, 1,900 same-sex couples had married in New Hampshire. This had increased to 2,329 couples by June 2013. The 2020 U.S. census showed that there were 3,508 married same-sex couple households (1,277 male couples and 2,231 female couples) and 1,987 unmarried same-sex couple households in New Hampshire.

== Public opinion ==
Public opinion for same-sex marriage in New Hampshire
Poll source	Dates administered	Sample size	Margin of error	Support	Opposition	Do not know / refused
Public Religion Research Institute	February 28 – December 8, 2025	165 adults	?	69%	29%	2%
Public Religion Research Institute	March 13 – December 2, 2024	181 adults	?	74%	24%	2%
Public Religion Research Institute	March 9 – December 7, 2023	170 adults	?	75%	23%	2%
Public Religion Research Institute	March 11 – December 14, 2022	?	?	82%	17%	1%
Public Religion Research Institute	March 8 – November 9, 2021	?	?	76%	23%	1%
Public Religion Research Institute	January 7 – December 20, 2020	238 adults	?	82%	18%	<0.5%
Public Religion Research Institute	April 5 – December 23, 2017	311 adults	?	73%	22%	5%
Public Religion Research Institute	May 18, 2016 – January 10, 2017	432 adults	?	70%	19%	11%
Public Religion Research Institute	April 29, 2015 – January 7, 2016	369 adults	?	73%	19%	8%
Bloomberg Politics/Saint Anselm New Hampshire Poll	May 2–6, 2015	952 likely voters	?	67%	24%	9%
Public Religion Research Institute	April 2, 2014 – January 4, 2015	219 adults	?	75%	19%	6%
New York Times/CBS News/YouGov	September 20 – October 1, 2014	1260 likely voters	± 3.0%	63%	24%	13%
Public Policy Polling	January 9–12, 2014	1,354 voters	± 2.7%	60%	29%	11%
Public Policy Polling	September 13–16, 2013	1,038 voters	± 3.0%	55%	32%	13%
Nelson A. Rockefeller Center	April 22–25, 2013	433 registered voters	± 4.7%	55%	30%	15%
Public Policy Polling	May 10–13, 2012	1,163 voters	± 2.9%	57%	35%	8%
Nelson A. Rockefeller Center	April 2–5, 2012	403 registered voters	± 4.9%	55%	31%	14%
Public Policy Polling	June 30 – July 5, 2011	622 voters	± 3.8%	51%	38%	11%
Nelson A. Rockefeller Center	April 11–14, 2011	426 registered voters	± 4.8%	42%	42%	16%
Greenberg Quinlan Rosner Research	January 30 – February 3, 2011	622 voters	± 3.9%	59%	34%	7%
University of New Hampshire Survey Center/New Hampshire Freedom to Marry	April 13–22, 2009	491 voters	?	55%	39%	6%
University of New Hampshire Survey Center	February 2004	?	?	55%	?	?
University of New Hampshire Survey Center	May 2003	?	?	54%	?	?

A University of New Hampshire Survey Center poll conducted in February 2004 found that 64% of New Hampshire residents opposed a federal constitutional amendment to ban same-sex marriage. However, a later survey in February 2005 by Research 2000 for the Concord Monitor showed that 51% of likely voters in the state supported such a federal constitutional amendment.

A University of New Hampshire Survey Center poll taken between January 27 and February 6, 2011 found that 62% of New Hampshire residents opposed the new Republican-dominated General Court's efforts to repeal the 2009 law legalizing same-sex marriage, with only 29% in favor of repeal. In addition, 51% voiced strong opposition to repeal. A poll conducted between January 30 and February 3, 2011 by Greenberg Quinlan Rosner Research showed that 63% of residents opposed the bill repealing same-sex marriage, while 29% supported it. Another University of New Hampshire Survey Center poll, conducted between September 26 and October 2, 2011, showed that 62% of state residents were against repealing same-sex marriage, while 27% were in favor. Later polls found similar numbers. A Voter Consumer Research poll conducted on December 11–15, 2011 found that 64% of New Hampshire voters opposed repealing same-sex marriage, while 31% supported. A University of New Hampshire Survey Center survey conducted between January 25 and February 2, 2012 showed that 59% of New Hampshire voters were against repealing same-sex marriage, while 32% were in favor, and a further University of New Hampshire Survey Center poll, conducted between August 1 and 12, 2012, found that 61% of New Hampshire voters were against repealing same-sex marriage, while 28% supported.

A July 2011 Public Policy Polling survey found that 80% of respondents supported legal recognition for same-sex couples, with 45% supporting same-sex marriage and 35% supporting civil unions, while only 19% thought that there should be no legal recognition and 1% were not sure. A May 2012 survey by the same polling organization found that 85% of respondents supported legal recognition for same-sex couples, with 54% supporting same-sex marriage and 31% supporting civil unions, while only 13% thought that there should be no legal recognition and 2% were not sure.

== See also ==
- LGBT rights in New Hampshire
- Gene Robinson
- Same-sex marriage in the United States
