= Ron Paul 2012 presidential campaign =

American political campaign

Ron Paul for President 2012
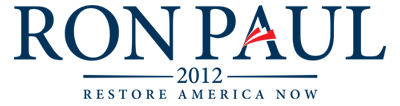
- Campaign: 2012 Republican Party presidential primaries
- Candidate: Ron Paul; U.S. Representative from Texas (1976–1977) (1979–1985) (1997–2013)
- Affiliation: Republican Party
- Status: Announced May 13, 2011; Lost Republican nomination to Mitt Romney
- Headquarters: Lake Jackson, Texas, U.S.
- Key people: John Tate (manager); Jesse Benton (chairman); Dimitri Kesari (deputy campaign manager); Gary Howard, Jr. (press secretary); John McCardell (finance director); Fritz Wenzel (pollster); Doug Wead (senior advisor)
- Receipts: US$40,947,039
- Slogan: Restore America Now

Website
- ronpaul2012.com (archived - June 6, 2012)

From 2011 to 2012, Ron Paul, a U.S. representative from Texas, unsuccessfully ran for the 2012 Republican Party nomination for the president of the United States.

On April 14, 2011, Paul announced the formation of a "testing-the-waters" account, and had stated that he would decide whether he would enter the race by at least early May. Paul announced the formation of an exploratory committee on April 26 in Des Moines, Iowa. He declared his presidential candidacy on May 13 in Exeter, New Hampshire.

On July 12, Paul announced that he would not seek another term as the representative of Texas's 14th district to focus on his presidential campaign. By April 2012, the campaign had raised more than $38 million.

On May 14, Paul announced that he would end active campaigning for the remaining primary states and would never formally suspend his campaign. Instead, Paul focused on delegate selection conventions at the state level. On July 14, Paul failed to win a plurality of delegates at the final convention in the state of Nebraska, which ended his ability to ensure a speaking spot at the Republican National Convention, where Paul's campaign won 190 delegates.

== Background and pre-campaign events ==
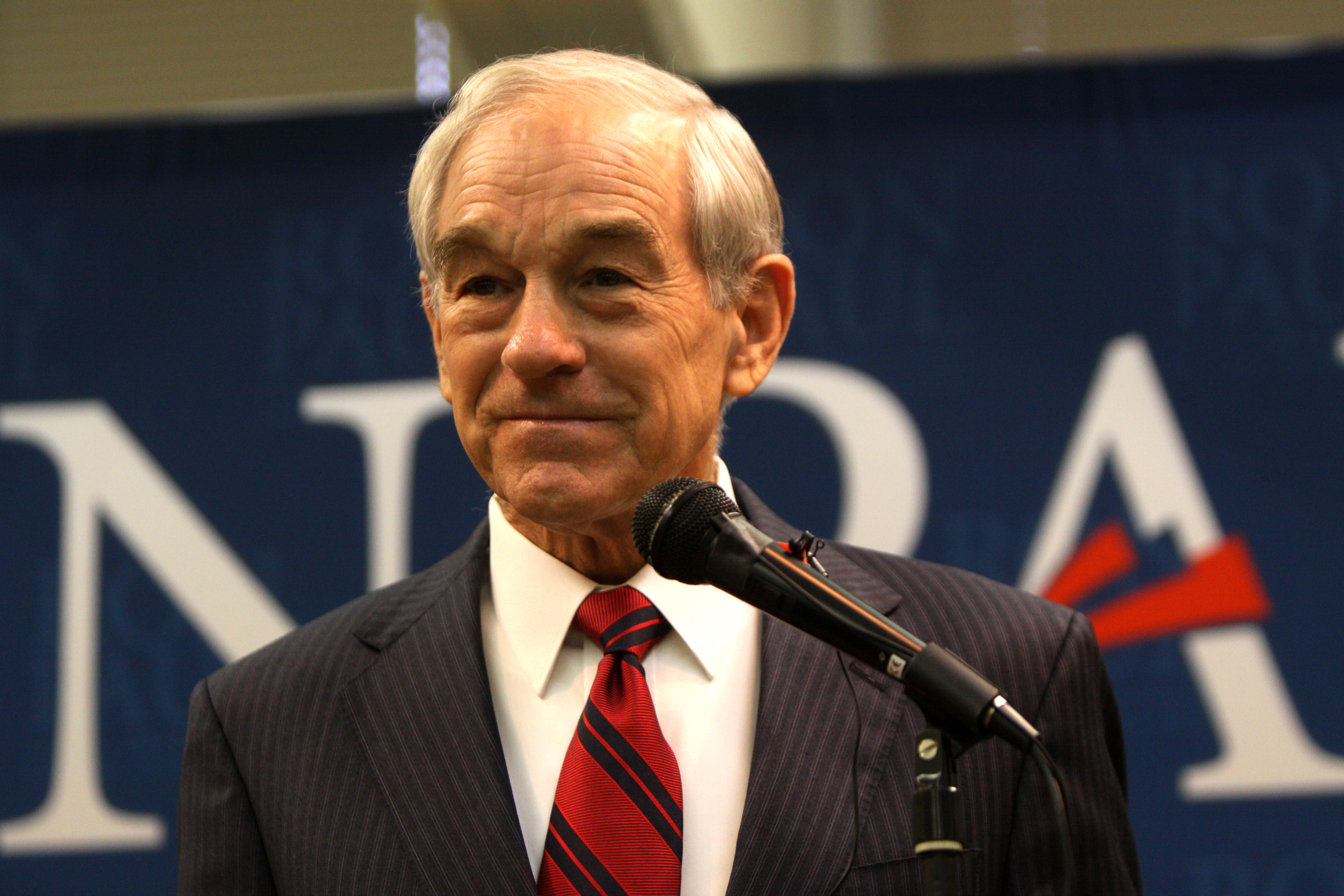
Ron Paul at a townhall in Le Mars, Iowa on December 30, 2011

Heavily speculated as a possible Republican candidate in the 2012 presidential election, Paul appeared in the 2010 Conservative Political Action Conference (CPAC) straw poll. Paul won the poll, defeating Mitt Romney, who had won it the previous three years. Paul also won the 2011 CPAC straw poll with 30 percent of the vote. Following that, he also won the paid, online Arizona Tea Party Patriots straw poll on February 28, 2011, with 49% of the vote.

In February 2011, Paul asked supporters to donate to his Liberty Political Action Committee to fund trips to Iowa and elsewhere to explore a possible 2012 presidential candidacy. On February 21, a Presidents' Day money bomb raised around $400,000 in 24 hours. Liberty PAC raised more than $700,000 during its February relaunch. By the end of March, Liberty PAC had raised more than $1 million.

On April 14, 2011, it was announced that Paul had formed a "testing-the-waters" organization, similar to Newt Gingrich's efforts in exploring his potential candidacy. Paul's spokesman, Jesse Benton was quoted as saying, "He remains undecided on what his plans will be, but as a final decision draws closer, his team has put the pieces in place for him to flip a switch and hit the ground running if he decides to run for president." Paul announced the formation of an exploratory committee in Des Moines, Iowa on April 26 in preparation for a potential bid for the Republican presidential nomination.

On May 5, Paul participated in a debate in Greenville, South Carolina among only five candidates. A moneybomb was scheduled for the same day, which raised over $1 million for Paul's campaign.

== Campaign developments ==
=== Announcements ===
On May 13, 2011, in Exeter, New Hampshire, Paul announced his decision to seek the Republican nomination in the 2012 election. The announcement was broadcast live nationally on ABC's Good Morning America.

On May 14, 2012, Paul made a statement on the campaign's website that he would no longer be actively campaigning in remaining state primaries, but would instead continue his presidential bid by seeking to collect delegates at caucuses and state conventions for the Republican National Convention in August 2012.

=== GOP debates and straw polls ===
He participated in a debate on June 13, 2011, at Saint Anselm College in Goffstown, New Hampshire. On June 18, 2011, Paul won the Southern Republican Leadership Conference straw poll with 41%, winning by a large margin on Jon Huntsman, who trailed second with 25% and Michele Bachmann with 13% (Mitt Romney came in fifth with 5%). On June 19 he again won the Clay County Iowa StrawPoll with 25%, while Michele Bachmann trailed second with 12%. Paul indicated in a June 2011 interview that if nominated, he would consider former New Jersey Superior Court judge Andrew Napolitano as his running mate.

Paul also participated in another debate on August 11, 2011, in Ames, Iowa, and overwhelmingly won the post-debate polls. He then came in second in the Ames Straw Poll with 4,671 votes, narrowly losing to Michele Bachmann by 152 votes or 0.9%, a statistical first-place tie finish according to some in the news media. He received the fourth most votes for a candidate in the history of the Ames Straw Poll.

On August 20, in the New Hampshire Young Republicans Straw Poll Paul came again first, again overwhelmingly, with 45%, Mitt Romney trailing second with 10%. On August 27, in the Georgia State GOP Straw Poll Paul came in a close second place behind Georgia resident Herman Cain, who had 26% of the vote, with Paul receiving 25.7%.

On September 5, Paul attended the Palmetto Freedom Forum in South Carolina along with fellow candidates Herman Cain, Mitt Romney, Michele Bachmann and Newt Gingrich. The forum was paneled by congressmen Steve King of Iowa, senator Jim DeMint of South Carolina and Dr. Robert P. George, the founder of the American Principles Project which hosted the event.

On September 12, Paul attended the Tea Party Republican presidential debate broadcast by CNN. During the event, Paul received both unexpected "cheers" and "boos" for his responses to the questions posed by the debate moderators and fellow debate participants. When Rick Santorum questioned Paul about his position regarding the motivation behind the September 11 attacks, some of the audience jeered his response that U.S. foreign occupation was the "real motivation behind the September 11 attacks and the vast majority of other instances of suicide terrorism".

When one of the moderators posed a hypothetical scenario of a healthy 30-year-old man requiring intensive care but neglected to be insured pressing Paul with "Are you saying that society should just let him die?", several audience members cheered "yeah!" Paul disagreed with the audience reaction stating that while he practiced as a doctor in a Catholic hospital before the Medicaid era, "We never turned anybody away from the hospital." Paul elaborated further a few days later that he believed the audience was cheering self-reliance and that "the media took it and twisted it".

Jack Burkman, a Republican Party (GOP) strategist, was asked of Paul's performance in the debate. While Burkman stated that his national radio program's polling suggested Rick Perry won the debate (156 Perry votes to 151 Paul votes), he believed Paul's support is extremely deep like Democrat support for Bobby Kennedy decades before and predicted "he could come from behind as the horses turn for home and win the nomination."

On September 18, Paul won the California state GOP straw poll with 44.9% of the vote, held at the JW Marriott in downtown Los Angeles. Out of 833 ballots cast, Paul garnered the greatest number of votes with 374, beating his nearest competitor Texas Gov. Rick Perry by a wide margin.

On September 24, Paul finished fifth in the GOP's Florida Presidency 5 straw poll with 10.4% of the vote. Paul won with 37% of the vote at the Values Voter Summit on October 8; the highest ever recorded at the event.

On October 22, Paul won the Ohio Republican straw poll with the support of 53% of the participants, more than double the support of the second-place candidate, Herman Cain (26%).

Paul won the National Federation of Republican Assemblies Presidential Straw Poll of Iowa voters on October 29 with 82% of the vote.

On November 19, Paul won the North Carolina Republican Straw Poll with 52% of the vote, finishing well ahead of the second-place candidate, Newt Gingrich, who received 22% of the vote.

=== Polls ===
In an August Rasmussen Reports poll of likely voters across the political spectrum asking if they would vote for Paul or Barack Obama, the response narrowly favored Obama (39%) over Paul (38%), but by a smaller margin than the same question asked a month ago (41–37%). Paul finished 3rd in a late-August poll of likely Republican primary voters, trailing Rick Perry and Mitt Romney and ahead of Michele Bachmann, climbing from 4th position which, according to another poll, he occupied only a few days earlier.

In a September Harris Poll, respondents chose Paul (51%) over Obama (49%).

In the Illinois Republican Straw Poll held in the beginning of November, Paul took 52% of the votes of those polled with Herman Cain coming in second with 18%.

In a November 10–12 Bloomberg News poll of Iowans likely to participate in the January 3, 2012 Republican caucuses, Paul was in a four-way tie at 19 percent with Cain, Romney and Gingrich at 20, 18 and 17 percent respectively.

A Bloomberg News poll released on November 16, 2011, showed Paul at 17% in New Hampshire, in second place to Romney's 40%.

A Public Policy Polling poll released on December 13, 2011, put Paul in a statistical tie for first in Iowa with Newt Gingrich, polling 21% and 22%, respectively. The RealClearPolitics.com average shows Paul in second place in New Hampshire at 18.3% on December 28, 2011. Public Policy Polling results from December 18 show that Paul is now leading in Iowa with 23%, followed by Romney at 20% and Gingrich at 14%.

A January 2012 Rasmussen Reports poll of likely voters across the political spectrum found that in a hypothetical two-candidate race between Paul and Barack Obama, respondents preferred Obama (43%) over Paul (37%). The RealClearPolitics.com average of polls also found Obama (47%) favored over Paul (42%), in a two-candidate race.

A January Pew Research Center poll of registered voters across the political spectrum on the eve of the South Carolina primary found that in a hypothetical three-way race between Obama, Romney, and Paul, with Paul running as a third-party candidate, respondents would choose Obama (44%) over Romney (32%) and Paul (18%). (Paul had repeatedly stated he had no plans for a third-party run.)

In polls of likely Republican primary voters on the eve of the South Carolina Republican primary, Paul placed third both in South Carolina (15%) and nationally (14%), trailing Romney and Gingrich.

A Rasmussen poll in April 2012 showed Paul as the only Republican candidate able to defeat Obama in a head-to-head match-up. Paul beat Obama by one point in the poll with 44% of the vote.

=== Moneybombs and fundraising ===
Paul's second moneybomb (the first being before his official announcement) was scheduled for June 5, 2011, the anniversary of the 1933 joint resolution which abolished the gold standard. The June 5 moneybomb, which was themed as "The Revolution vs. RomneyCare: Round One", raised approximately $1.1 million. A third moneybomb themed "Ready, Ames, Fire!" was executed on July 19, 2011, to provide support leading up to the Ames Straw Poll on August 13, 2011, raising over $550,000.

In the second quarter of 2011, Paul's campaign ranked second, behind Mitt Romney, in total dollars raised with $4.5 million. This was $1.5 million more than his original goal of $3 million. During that quarter, the Paul campaign had raised more money from military personnel than all other GOP candidates combined, and even more money than Barack Obama, a trend that has continued from Paul's 2008 presidential campaign.

A fourth moneybomb took place on Paul's 76th birthday on August 20, 2011. It raised more than $1.8 million despite a cyber-attack against the site that took it down for several hours, after which the donation drive was extended for another twelve hours.

A fifth moneybomb began on September 17, the date of the 224th anniversary of the creation of the United States Constitution. Continuing throughout the following day, it raised more than $1 million. Shortly after the Constitution Day moneybomb, a sixth moneybomb, entitled "End of Quarter Push", began on September 22 in an attempt to generate $1.5 million before the 3rd Quarter fundraising deadline.

In the third quarter of 2011, Paul raised over $8 million. A three-day moneybomb entitled "Black This Out" brought in more than $2.75 million in mid-October.

On December 16, a moneybomb titled the "Tea Party MoneyBomb" took place and raised upwards of $4 million over a period of two days.

Paul was also supported by the Super PAC Endorse Liberty. By January 16, 2012, the PAC had spent $2.83 million promoting Paul's campaign.

=== "Blue Republican" movement ===
In June 2011, online publisher Robin Koerner coined the term "Blue Republican" to refer to U.S. voters who consider themselves to be liberal or progressive—or who generally vote Democratic—but plan to register as Republicans and vote in the U.S. 2012 Republican presidential primaries for Paul. The phrase "Blue Republican" quickly spread after Koerner's article "If You Love Peace, Become a 'Blue Republican' (Just for a Year)" was published in The Huffington Post on June 7. Social media entrepreneur Israel Anderson then promoted the term on Facebook, later teaming with Koerner to expand the movement.

Five days after his original article coining the term, Koerner published a follow-up article on the term's popularity: "'Blue Republicans': an Idea Whose Time Has Come." The article was shared on the social networking site Facebook more than 11,000 times by the time the second article was published.

=== Federal budget ===
On June 21, 2011, Paul was the first 2012 Republican presidential candidate to sign the Cut, Cap, and Balance Pledge. This pledge seeks commitments from politicians for changes of the debt limit, spending decreases, and taxation. The pledge also implores signers to endorse passage of a balanced budget amendment to the Constitution.

=== Media coverage ===
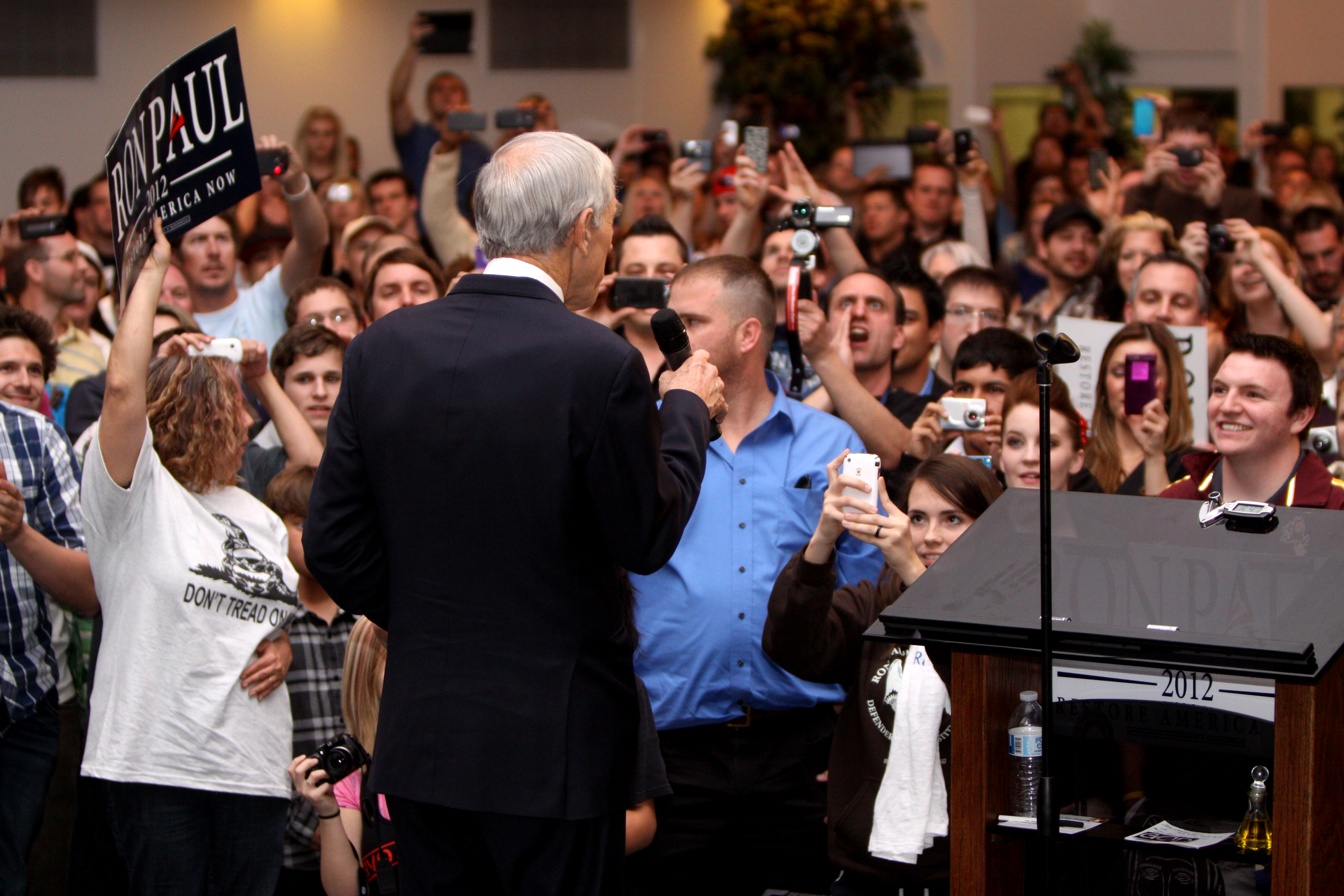
Paul speaking to supporters at a post-debate rally in Mesa, Arizona on February 22, 2012

During his previous presidential campaign, it was alleged by many supporters that there was a media blackout and suppression of coverage of Paul. Similar allegations arose in the 2012 campaign and received some media coverage. Politico columnist Roger Simon noted on CNN's Reliable Sources that Paul has received considerably less coverage than Michele Bachmann, despite earning a close second to her at the Ames Straw Poll. Simon later opined in Politico that the media was treating Paul unfairly.

Comedian Jon Stewart similarly complained about the lack of coverage, despite Paul polling much better than candidates who received coverage. Stewart presented a montage of mainstream media clips that showed commentators ignoring, and two CNN correspondents admitting to suppressing, coverage of Paul. Will Wilkinson opined in The Economist that "Ron Paul remains as willfully overlooked as an American war crime", arguing that if Paul had won the Ames straw poll, it would have been written off as irrelevant, but since Bachmann had won, it was claimed to boost her campaign. Other commentators noted that Paul has had success at past straw polls but has not turned that into broader success as a reason for the relative lack of media attention.

Paul was asked in a Fox News interview "What are they [the media] afraid of?" He answered "They don't want to discuss my views, because I think they're frightened by me challenging the status quo and the establishment."

During the November 12 CBS/National Journal Debate, Paul was allocated 90 seconds speaking time. Paul's campaign responded, saying, "Congressman Paul was only allocated 90 seconds of speaking in one televised hour. If we are to have an authentic national conversation on issues such as security and defense, we can and must do better to ensure that all voices are heard. CBS News, in their arrogance, may think they can choose the next president. Fortunately, the people of Iowa, New Hampshire, and across America get to vote and not the media elites."

The Pew Research Center's Project for Excellence in Journalism found in August 2011 that Paul received substantially less coverage than other candidates in the 2012 race. Pew released another study in October 2011 confirming that Paul has been receiving disproportionately low coverage in the media. Paul polled 6.0–9.8% during the study period, but only received 2% of media coverage, the lowest of all candidates. It also noted that Paul's coverage among blogs was the most favorable of all candidates. In January 2012, The Atlantic cited the weekly Pew study. They noted that despite steadily rising in the polls, Paul has been losing his share of press coverage, going from 34% in late-December 2011 to about 3% in mid-January 2012. They also noted a sharp drop in positive coverage and a small rise in negative.

=== RNC lawsuit ===
In June, a group of lawyers and legal experts filed a lawsuit in the US District Court against the Republican National Committee and 55 state and territorial Republican party organizations for depriving Paul delegates of voice in the nominating process as required by law, and illegally coercing them to choose Mitt Romney as the party's presidential nominee. Supporters of the effort say there is "evidence that the voting rights of Ron Paul Republican delegates and voters … have been violated by nearly every state GOP party and the RNC during the 2012 primary election phase."

The plaintiffs claim that the party violated federal law by forcing delegates to sign loyalty affidavits, under threat of perjury, to vote for Mitt Romney, before an official nominee is selected. The suit alleged that there had been "a systematic campaign of election fraud at state conventions," employing rigging of voting machines, ballot stuffing, and falsification of ballot totals. The suit further pointed to incidents at state conventions, including acts of violence and changes in procedural rules, allegedly intended to deny participation of Paul supporters in the party decision-making and to prevent votes from being cast for Paul. An attorney representing the complainants said that Paul campaign advisor Doug Wead had voiced support for the legal action. Paul himself told CNN that although the lawsuit was not a part of his campaign's strategy and that he had not been advising his supporters to sue, he was not going to tell his supporters not to sue, if they had a legitimate argument. "If they're not following the rules, you have a right to stand up for the rules. I think for the most part these winning caucuses that we've been involved in we have followed the rules. And the other side has at times not followed the rules."

In August 2012, the lawsuit was dismissed by U.S. District Judge David Carter, who described most of the plaintiffs' claims as vague and largely unintelligible. The judge said that the one intelligible claim they had lodged—that the Massachusetts Republican Party had illegally excluded 17 elected state delegates from participating in the national convention because they had refused to commit to a particular nominee—failed because political parties have a right to exclude people from membership and leadership roles. The judge left the plaintiffs "a third and final opportunity" to amend their complaint. The plaintiffs filed an amended complaint just days before the scheduled start of the convention.

=== National convention ===
Despite ceasing most campaign activities, the Paul campaign did some fundraising in July 2012, in an attempt to fund the transportation expenses of Paul delegates traveling to the Republican National Convention in Tampa, Florida. Paul said one of his goals at the convention was to "plant our flag and show that our Liberty movement is the future of the GOP". He also said he was expecting a conflict over "credentials" and the party's platform. As of late August, Paul's pet issue of auditing the Federal Reserve is on the draft version of the Republican Party's national platform. Presumptive candidate Romney would call for the plank's final inclusion.

== Electoral results ==
=== January ===
Paul finished third in the Iowa Republican caucuses, held on January 3, 2012. Paul was projected to receive 7 delegates out of 28, as many as Mitt Romney and one less than Rick Santorum, making him tied for second place in the delegate count at the time.

Paul placed second in the New Hampshire Republican primary, held on January 10, with 22.9% of the vote, behind Mitt Romney with 39.4%. He gained 3 delegates from this contest. In the South Carolina Republican primary on January 21, Paul placed fourth and gained no delegates. Paul also gained no delegates in the Florida Republican primary on January 31, after he did little campaigning in the state because of its "winner-take-all" delegate apportionment.

=== February ===
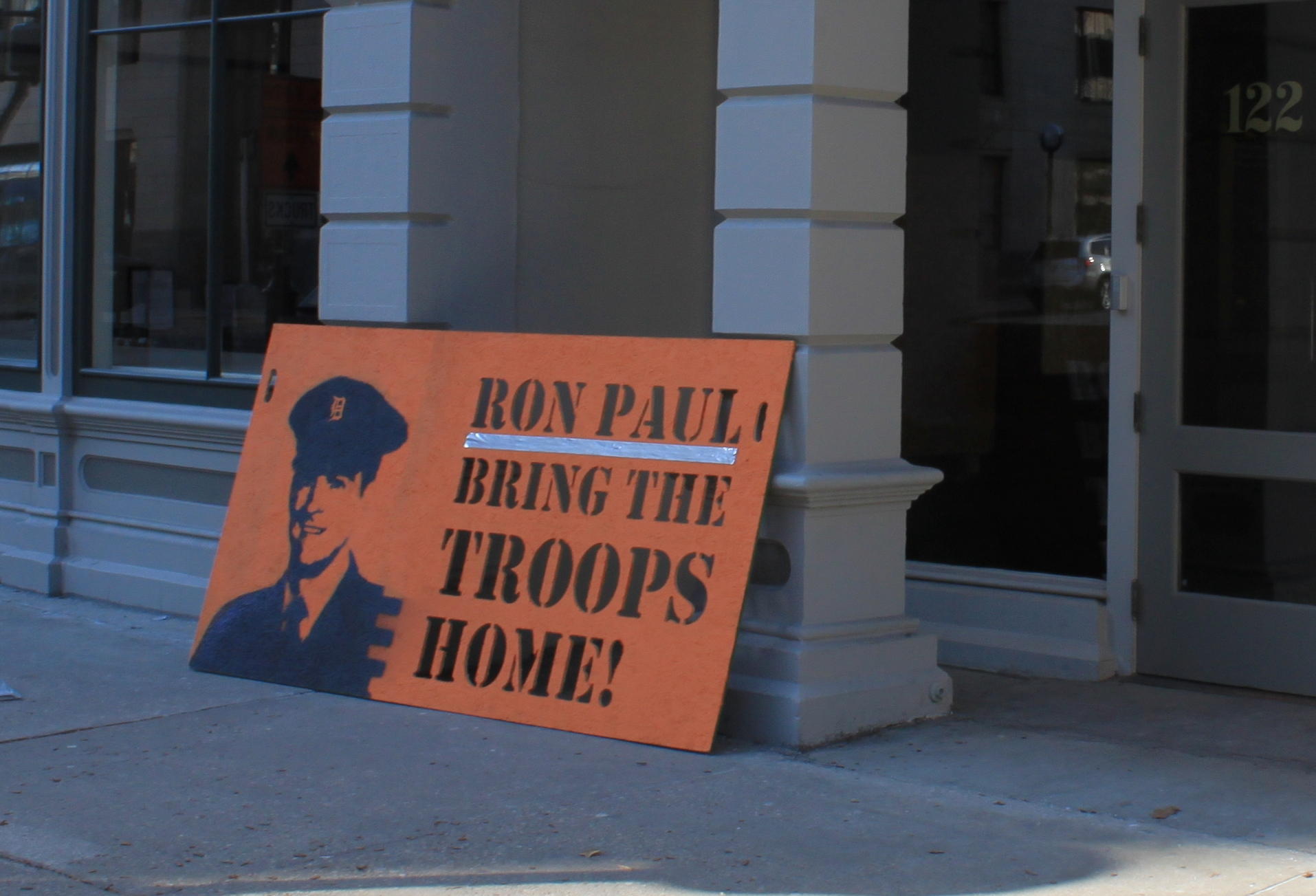
Ron Paul support sign on day of the Michigan presidential primary, Ann Arbor

The Nevada Republican caucuses were held on February 4. Paul finished third behind Newt Gingrich and Mitt Romney with 18.7% of the votes and 5 of the delegates, behind the winner Romney's 50.0% and Gingrich's 21.1%. The Colorado and Minnesota Republican caucuses were held on February 7. In Colorado, Paul finished fourth with 11.8% behind Santorum (winner with 40.2%), Romney, and Gingrich. In Minnesota, Paul finished 2nd (27.1%) behind winner Rick Santorum (44.9%), with Romney (16.9%) and Gingrich (10.8%) placing 3rd and 4th. A non-binding vote in the Missouri Republican primary was held on February 7 as well, and Paul got 12.2% of the vote. The primary did not apportion any delegates; that will be done at the Missouri caucuses, scheduled to begin on March 17.

On February 17, with 95% of precincts in the Maine Republican caucuses reporting, Paul was running second to Mitt Romney with 34.9% of the vote to Romney's 39%. Neither of the frontrunners have pressed for a recount, and the Maine Republican Party's chairman has stated that recounts are impossible due to the votes being physically thrown away.

The Michigan and Arizona Republican primaries were held on February 28. Paul came in third place in Michigan, with 11.9%; and fourth in Arizona, with 8.5%.

=== March and Super Tuesday ===
A large portion of the delegates for the Republican National Convention were awarded in March, which includes the Washington Republican caucuses on March 3, Super Tuesday on March 6, and several other states later in the month. Paul came in second in the Washington caucuses, with 24.8%. On March 10, he picked up one delegate in the U.S Virgin Islands Caucuses while Romney added four delegates to the three super-delegates previously known to support him.

Paul received 1.2% of the vote in the Puerto Rico primary, coming in sixth, his lowest polling of any territory during the campaign.

On The Tonight Show with Jay Leno, Paul said he forwent Secret Service protection because he considered it "a form of welfare" and that he believed he should pay for his own protection.

Ultimately, Paul accrued the most second place popular vote finishes in the primaries.

=== Delegate count ===
The Paul campaign pursued a strategy of gathering support from state delegates as opposed to outright winning states. For example, Paul had a strong showing in Romney's home state, Massachusetts, with supporters getting the majority of delegates there (though they are compelled to vote for Romney in the first round), causing a battle between the Paul delegates, the Massachusetts Republican Party, and the Republican National Convention Committee. A similar situation played out in Louisiana, with the Paul campaign initially winning 17 of 30 available delegates before procedural and legal challenges changed the allocation. Paul also managed a delegate win in Nevada, with 88% of delegates supporting him. Paul won 21 of 25 delegates in Iowa.

Paul remained active in the race through the 2012 Republican National Convention. Leading up to the convention, he won bound-pluralities of the official delegations from the states of Iowa, Louisiana, Maine, Minnesota, Nevada, and Oregon (but not the Virgin Islands—despite winning the popular vote there). During the credentials committee meetings the week prior to the official opening of the convention, the Paul members of the delegations from Louisiana, Maine, and Oregon were disputed (as well as the Paul delegates from Massachusetts), and many of his delegates from those states were unseated. At the same time, Paul delegates from Oklahoma disputed the credentials of the official Oklahoma delegation, but they did not succeed. In the end, he had bound-pluralities from Iowa, Minnesota, and Nevada; however, he additionally had nomination-from-the-floor-pluralities in the states of Oregon and Alaska, plus the territory of the Virgin Islands. Under the 2012 rules, this total of 6 from-the-floor pluralities was sufficient to earn a fifteen-minute speech on national television; the rules were changed at the last minute to require 8 from-the-floor pluralities, and thus he did not speak at the convention. Although he wasn't named the 2012 Republican nominee, he did not officially end his campaign or endorse nominee Mitt Romney for president. At the convention, he received second place with 8% of the delegates; Gingrich and Santorum had released their bound delegates to Romney the week before the official opening of the convention. Paul's state-by-state delegates tallies were not verbally acknowledged by the RNC.

Paul would end the campaign with 118 delegates, coming in fourth behind Gingrich, Santorum, and Romney."2012 Republican Delegates".

== Republican National Convention ==
A Ron Paul rally was held in Tampa, Florida, the site of the 2012 Republican National Convention, the day before the convention was to begin.

== Endorsements ==
Ron Paul endorsements

Federal officials

Current US Senators

- Rand Paul, son and Senator from Kentucky

Current Congressmen

- Justin Amash, Representative from Michigan
- Walter B. Jones, Representative from North Carolina
- Tim Johnson, Representative from Illinois

Former executive federal government officials

- Paul Craig Roberts Former Assistant Secretary of the Treasury for Economic Policy

Former congressmen

- Joe Scarborough, Representative from Florida and media pundit
- Barry Goldwater, Jr., Representative from California

Former CIA Officers

- Michael Scheuer, a former CIA intelligence officer who served as the Chief of the Bin Laden Issue Station from 1996 to 1999, and Special Advisor to the CIA's bin Laden unit from September 2001 to November 2004.

State officials

Former governors

- Gary Johnson, former governor of New Mexico
- Jesse Ventura, former governor of Minnesota, TV show host, Navy SEAL and professional wrestler

Former judges

- Andrew Napolitano, a former New Jersey Superior Court judge
- Richard B. Sanders, former Washington State Supreme Court Justice

Idaho

- Lenore Barrett, Idaho state representative
- Vito Barbieri, Idaho state representative
- Clinton Daniel, Lewiston City Council member
- Phil Hart, Idaho state representative
- Pete Nielsen, Idaho state representative
- Shirley McKague, Idaho state senator
- Monty J. Pearce, Idaho state senator
- Cornel Rasor, Bonner County Commissioner

Iowa

- Shawn Dietz, mayor of Hampton
- Glen Massie, Iowa state representative
- Brent Oleson, Linn County Supervisor
- Kim Pearson, Iowa state representative
- Jason Schultz, Iowa state representative
- Kent Sorenson, Iowa state senator, former Michele Bachmann Iowa campaign chairman

Louisiana

- Charlie Davis, Deputy Chair
- Joel Robideaux, Louisiana House of Representatives

Maine

- Aaron F. Libby, Maine state representative
- Larry C Dunphy, Maine state representative
- Jeffery A. Gifford, Maine state representative
- R. Ryan Harmon, Maine state representative
- David D. Johnson, Maine state representative
- Lance E. Harvell, Maine state representative
- Michael D. McClellan, Maine state representative
- Beth A. O'Connor, Maine state representative
- Heather W. Sirocki, Maine state representative
- Paul Waterhouse, Maine state representative
- Michael J. Willette, Maine state representative

Missouri

- Paul Curtman, Missouri state representative

New Hampshire

- Jim Forsythe, New Hampshire state senator
- Andy Sanborn, New Hampshire state senator
- Ray White, New Hampshire state senator
- Anne Cartwright, New Hampshire state representative (Cheshire District 2)
- Jenn Coffey, New Hampshire state representative (Merrimack District 6)
- Seth Cohn, New Hampshire state representative (Merrimack District 6)
- Tim Comerford, New Hampshire state representative
- Guy Comtois, New Hampshire state representative (Belknap District 5)
- Cameron DeJong, New Hampshire state representative (Hillsborough District 9)
- Phil Greazzo, New Hampshire state representative (Hillsborough District 17) and Manchester Ward 10 Alderman
- J.R. Hoell, New Hampshire state representative (Merrimack District 13)
- Paul Ingbretson, New Hampshire state representative (Grafton District 5)
- Kyle Jones, New Hampshire state representative (Rochester)
- Laura Jones, New Hampshire state representative (Rochester)
- Robert Kingsbury, New Hampshire state representative (Belknap District 4)
- George Lambert, New Hampshire state representative (Hillsborough District 27)
- Robert Malone, New Hampshire state representative (Belknap District 5)
- Jonathan S. Maltz, New Hampshire state representative (Hillsborough District 27)
- Donna Mauro, New Hampshire state representative
- Andrew Manuse, New Hampshire state representative
- Paul Mirski, New Hampshire state representative (Grafton District 10)
- Keith Murphy, New Hampshire state representative (Bedford)
- Laurence Rappaport, New Hampshire state representative
- Kevin Reichard, New Hampshire state representative
- Lisa Scontsas, New Hampshire state representative (Hillsborough District 22)
- Tammy Simmons, New Hampshire state representative (Hillsborough District 17)
- Kathy Souza, New Hampshire state representative
- Norman Tregenza, New Hampshire state representative
- Lucien Vita, New Hampshire state representative (Middleton)
- Carol Vita, New Hampshire state representative (Middleton)
- Mark Warden, New Hampshire state representative (Hillsborough District 7)

According to Forsythe, Paul has received support from 20 of New Hampshire's 400 state representatives as of early July 2011.

New Jersey

- Mike Doherty, New Jersey state senator

New York

- Dan Halloran, member of the New York City City Council

North Carolina

- Glen Bradley, North Carolina state representative

Oklahoma

- Charles Key, Oklahoma state representative

Pennsylvania

- Mike Folmer, Pennsylvania state senator

Rhode Island

- Nicholas D. Kettle, Rhode Island state senator
- Daniel P. Gordon, Rhode Island state representative

South Carolina

- Lee Bright, South Carolina Senate
- Kevin Bryant, South Carolina Senate
- Gary Bunker, city councilman
- Tom Davis, South Carolina Senate
- Thomas Ravenel, former state treasurer
- Danny Verdin, South Carolina Senate

South Dakota

- Jon Hansen, state representative
- Brian Liss, state representative

Texas

- David Simpson, Texas House of Representatives

Utah

- Casey O. Anderson, Utah state senator

Vermont

- Tom Burditt, state representative
- Adam Howard, state representative

Washington

- Rob Chase, Treasurer, Spokane County
- John Christina, Republican Central Committee, Spokane County
- Cary Condotta, Washington state representative
- Cindy Marshall, Republican Party Vice-chairwoman, Spokane County
- Jason Overstreet, Washington state representative
- Matt Shea, Washington state representative
- Karen Skoog, Republican Central Committee, Pend Oreille County

Wyoming

- Kendell Kroeker, Wyoming state representative (House District 35)

Political organizations and officials

Parties

- The Republican Liberty Caucus

Organizations

National

- Conservative Voice

DC

- DC Tea Party

Hawaii

- Hawaii Bar Owners Association

Illinois

- Tax Accountability of TAC, a Chicago-based national taxpayer watchdog organization. Tax Accountability is the political action arm of Taxpayers United of America (TUA).

Iowa

- Dubuque Tea Party of Iowa

New York

- Tea Party Coalition of Western New York
- Allegany County Tea Party of New York
- Buffalo Liberty Tea Party of New York
- Monroe County Tea Party of New York
- Ontario County Tea Party of New York
- Steuben County Tea Party of New York

Democratic Party officials

- Lynn Rudmin Chong, former Democratic chair of Belknap County, New Hampshire

Republican Party officials

Idaho

- Nate Jones, Republican Party Chairman of Payette County

Iowa

- Cory Adams, Republican chairman of Story County
- Josh Davenport, Republican co-chair of Clay County
- David Fischer, member of the State Central Committee
- Heath Hill, former Republican chairman of Story County
- Drew Ivers, member of the State Central Committee
- Jeremiah Johnson, member of the State Central Committee
- James Mills, member of the State Central Committee
- A.J. Spiker, Chairman of the State Central Committee
- Kris Thiessen, Republican chair of Clay County

Louisiana

- Chairman of the Livingston Parish Republican Party, Jason Stern of Walker
- Republican State Central Committee member Paul Goppelt of Ascension Parish
- Republican State Central Committee member Wallace Lucas of Jefferson Parish.
- Republican State Central Committeeman Harold Williams of Baton Rouge. Mr. Williams is also a former Chairman of the East Baton Rouge Parish Republican Party

Minnesota

- Former Republican State Chairman Chris Georgacas

Washington

- Ezekiel Lyen, member of the State GOP committee
- Mike Munch, treasurer of the Stevens County Republican Party
- Mark Stewart, Sergeant-at-Arms for the Pierce County GOP

Others

Press

- Arab American News (Michigan)
- The Daily Iowan
- The Littleton Courier (New Hampshire)
- Berlin Reporter (New Hampshire)
- Coos County Democrat (New Hampshire)
- The Medfield Press (Massachusetts)
- Real Liberty Media

Political activists

- Chuck Baldwin, political activist, 2008 presidential candidate and member of the Constitution Party
- Christopher R. Barron, member of the board of directors and co-founder of GOProud
- Kevin Carson, political writer
- Calvin Dufraisne, political activist, conservative opinion writer and contributing political commentator for the Revered Review
- Ken Hach, Iowa Tea-party co-founder
- Brandon Immel, editor of Lemon Global and candidate for Ohio's 98th District State Representative in 2014
- Adam Kokesh, political activist, talk show host
- Karen Kwiatkowski, political activist, retired U.S. Air Force Lieutenant Colonel, 2012 candidate for Congress from Virginia's 6th district
- Richard Mack, former sheriff from Arizona and gun rights activist
- Paul Maloney, Pro-life leader in North Dakota
- Russell Means, American Indian activist, politician and actor
- Debra Medina, political activist and candidate for the Republican nomination in the 2010 Texas gubernatorial election
- Tim Pugh, founder of the Cedar Rapids Tea Party
- Lew Rockwell, chairman of the Mises Institute
- David Ryon, political activist, 2008 GOP Candidate for Congress in Ohio's 12th CD & 2010 Constitution Party Nominee for Congress in Ohio's 15th CD
- Jim Treat, Iowa Tea-party co-founder

Businesspeople

- Linda Bean, businessperson and heiress to the L. L. Bean company
- Alex Beltramo, co-founder of game website pogo.com
- Patrick M. Byrne, CEO of Overstock.com
- Gerald Celente, author and business consultant
- Bill Gross, American financial manager and investment author
- Dennis Hof, Pimp and entrepreneur
- Jonathan Johnson, Overstock.com president
- Justin Machacek, Emmy award-winning Christian television producer, independent faith-based filmmaker, and promotional creative.
- Iris Mack, mathematician and author
- Jim Rogers, investor
- Joel Salatin, farmer
- Peter Schiff, CEO of Euro Pacific Capital
- Peter Thiel, PayPal co-founder

Academia

- Walter Block, Professor of economics at Loyola University New Orleans and a senior fellow of the Ludwig von Mises Institute
- Gary Chartier, associate dean of La Sierra University
- Bruce Fein, lawyer and Constitutional law expert (senior campaign adviser)
- Kevin Gutzman, Professor of history and non-western cultures at Western Connecticut State University
- Murray Sabrin, professor of finance at Ramapo College
- Thomas Woods, American historian, economist and author
- Nassim Nicholas Taleb, Lebanese American risk engineering professor and essayist, author of The Black Swan

Pastors, clergymen, and religious proponents

- Steven Andrew, Pastor and president of USA Christian Ministries
- Glen E. Bandel, Pastor of the Nora Springs Christian Church, Floyd County, Iowa
- Voddie Baucham, Pastor at Grace Family Baptist Church in Spring, Texas
- Mike Demory, Pastor of Heartland Church of Christ, Dubuque, Iowa
- Doug Holmes, Pastor of Sovereign Grace Church, Dows, Iowa
- Kent Hovind Evangelical Creation Scientist
- Mark McGlohon, Sioux City, Iowa Reverend
- Brian D. Nolder, pastor of Christ the Redeemer Church, Marion County, Iowa
- Darcy Van Orden, chair of the Utah Republican Liberty Caucus
- Adam Pierce, Associate Pastor of Buchanan Avenue Baptist Church, Sioux City, Iowa
- John Preus, Pastor of Trinity Lutheran Church, Clinton, Iowa

Celebrities, commentators, miscellaneous

- Aimee Allen, singer and songwriter
- Bill Burr
- Michelle Branch, singer
- Darren E. Burrows (and Wife Melinda), actor best known for role in Northern Exposure
- Chris Carr, defensive back for Baltimore Ravens
- Kelly Clarkson, pop singer
- Anthony Crivello, actor
- Jonathan Davis, lead singer of Korn
- John Derbyshire, commentator
- Clint Didier, former NFL Washington Redskins tight end, Eltopia-area farmer, and 2010 Tea Party-backed conservative Republican U.S. Senate candidate
- Jerry Doyle, radio host, actor
- Arian Foster, running back for Houston Texans
- John Garver, nephew of Paul's primary rival Rick Santorum
- Golden State, indie rock band
- Michale Graves, former Misfits frontman
- Matt Harvey, guitarist of death metal band Exhumed
- Peyton Hillis, running back for Cleveland Browns
- D.L. Hughley, actor
- Alex Jones, radio host
- Tommy Jordan, internet sensation
- Keemstar
- Max Keiser, author and economist
- KRS-One, rapper
- Philip Labonte, singer for the band All That Remains
- Aaron Lewis, front man for the band Staind
- Juliette Lewis, Actress
- Julie Newmar, actress
- Chuck Norris, martial artist and actor
- Jason Paige, Music Producer and Singer of the Pokémon Theme
- Tony Pashos, offensive tackle for Cleveland Browns
- Joe Perry, guitarist, vocalist and songwriter for the rock band Aerosmith
- John Popper, Blues Traveler lead singer and harmonica virtuoso
- Prodigy, rapper
- Patrick Rodgers, vampire and music promoter also known as Dancing Ferret
- Joe Rogan, comedian and television host
- Five cousins of Mitt Romney: Ty Romney, Travis Romney, Chad Romney, Jared Romney and Troy Romney.
- Jon Schaffer, heavy metal guitarist for Iced Earth
- Snoop Dogg, rapper
- Speech, rapper
- Doug Stanhope, stand-up comedian
- Oliver Stone, film director, producer and screenwriter
- John Stossel, media pundit
- Douglas Carswell, UK Independence Party member of the British Parliament
- Andrew Sullivan, political commentator and blogger
- Vince Vaughn, actor
- Wale, rapper

Current Members of the European Parliament

- Nigel Farage, UKIP MEP for South East England
- Daniel Hannan, British Conservative party MEP for South East England

Non-U.S. citizens

- Norm Macdonald, Comedian

== See also ==
- Republican Party presidential primaries, 2012
- Ron Paul 2008 presidential campaign
- Draft Ron Paul movement
- Ron Paul newsletters
- Rand Paul 2016 presidential campaign
