= Steve Vaillancourt =

American politician (1951–2017)

John Steven Vaillancourt (December 1, 1951 – March 27, 2017) was an American politician, who served as a member of the New Hampshire House of Representatives. He represented Hillsborough County District 15, the city of Manchester Ward 8. He served from 1996 to 2014 and from 2016 until his death. He served as a member of the Democratic Party, the Libertarian Party, and later the Republican Party. Vaillancourt also served as Manchester alderman for Ward 8 from 1999 to 2001 while serving in the State House of Representatives.

== Early life, education, and early political career ==
Vaillancourt was born in Middlebury, Vermont, and raised in the Champlain Valley region of Vermont. He attended Vergennes Union High School in Vergennes, Vermont. He graduated summa cum laude from Plymouth State University with a B.A. in history in 1974. While at Plymouth, he was the play-by-play radio announcer for many of the sports, injecting comments and sports history into his broadcasts. He was sports director of WPCR radio.

== New Hampshire House of Representatives ==
=== Elections ===
He first ran for the New Hampshire House of Representatives in 1994 as a Democrat, but lost getting just 15% of the vote. He ran again in 1996 and won the seat with 19% of the vote, sharing the district with Democrat Raymond Buckley and Republican Francis Riley. In 1998, he won re-election with 20% of the vote. In 2000, he sought election to the New Hampshire State Senate, losing the Democratic primary to Dan O'Neil. After losing the primary, he sought re-election to the House as a Libertarian Party member and won with 18% of the vote.

Vaillancourt was successfully reelected to the House as a Republican in 2002 (21%), 2004 (25%), 2006 (19%), 2008 (19%), 2010 (25%), and 2012 (25%).

Following Vaillancourt's opposition to a resolution introduced in the 2014 legislative session sponsored by the grassroots political action committee Wolf PAC, which would call for an Article V Convention to propose a constitutional amendment to get money out of politics and overturn the Supreme Court's Citizens United decision, Wolf PAC mobilized to campaign against Vaillancourt in his reelection efforts to the New Hampshire House of Representatives. Vaillancourt was ultimately defeated in his reelection bid, losing to Republican Mark McLean by 89 votes.

Vaillancourt ran a successful campaign to return to the State House in 2016, winning one of the two District 15 seats with 26% of the vote and defeating Mark McLean by 110 votes. He served in the body until his death in March 2017.

=== Tenure ===
While he only ran as a libertarian once, his political views were very much in line with their philosophy. He strongly opposed Obamacare and tried to block the expansion of medicaid in his state. He strongly opposed the death penalty in New Hampshire and supported abolishing it. When defending the bill that would abolish it, he said "We make mistakes. Police prosecutors make mistakes. In the name of Carlos DeLuna, please pass this bill."

He also supported marijuana legalization. In January 2014, he was the chief sponsor of House Bill 492, which would legalize marijuana for recreational purposes in New Hampshire. It followed the Colorado model, allowing possession of one ounce and six plants by adults over 21. He estimated it could bring the state $25 million to $30 million a year in revenue. It passed the House by a 170–162 vote, the first time a legislative body in the United States approved a full marijuana legalization bill. In addition, it passed despite a veto threat by Democratic Governor Maggie Hassan. A majority of Democrats voted in favor, 106–83, while a slight majority of Republicans voted against it, 64–79. However, Vaillancourt admitted that it was unlikely to pass the New Hampshire Senate saying "there is virtually no chance this bill will even get to the governor's desk." While some people hoped that Hassan would change her mind like how Governor John Lynch evolved on same-sex marriage in New Hampshire, Vaillancourt had doubts saying "Governor Lynch was worn down by some of his personal friends. I'm not going to lie to you, I don't think we're going to wear this governor down on this issue."

Vaillancourt supported same-sex marriage in the state, and voted in favor of HB 73, the 2009 bill which legalized same-sex marriage. He joined a minority of the Republican supermajority in opposition to the 2011 attempted repeal of same-sex marriage.

==== Child pornography controversy ====
Vaillancourt and former Democratic House member Raymond Buckley had been friends since 1983, and housemates until 1999, when Vaillancourt evicted Buckley for unknown reasons. The relationship had been strained since then. In January 2007, Vaillancourt leveled accusations that Buckley possessed child pornography, causing Buckley to temporarily suspend his campaign for the chairmanship of the New Hampshire Democratic Party. Vaillancourt later admitted he had no proof to back up his allegations. Buckley went on to become chair of the Democratic Party in March.

==== Nazi salute controversy ====
On May 15, 2012, Vaillancourt was temporarily suspended from the House floor after stating "Sieg Heil" in the direction of the Speaker, Bill O'Brien. The action came after Vaillancourt objected to limitations on debate over a voter ID bill, only to be ruled out of order by the Speaker. An apology committee of three (Rep. Shawn Jasper, R-Hudson, Rep. David Hess, R-Hooksett, and Rep. David B. Campbell, D-Nashua) was formed in order to compel Vaillancourt to form an acceptable apology to the House; Vaillancourt offered two unaccepted apologies, one offering never to mention any German words on the floor, until his third apology was finally accepted by the House. Vaillancourt was the first member of the New Hampshire House to be ejected from the chamber in over two decades.

==== Sexist comments ====
In a 2014 blog post, Vaillancourt described New Hampshire Congresswoman Ann McLane Kuster as "ugly as sin", comparing her unfavorably to a drag queen. In his blog, he went on to praise the looks of Republican challenger Marilinda Garcia, who described his views as "sexist" the next day.

=== Committee assignments ===
2013

- Criminal Justice and Public Safety

2011

- Finance
- Finance-Division I
- Special Committee On Redistricting

== Personal life ==
Vaillancourt lived in Manchester, New Hampshire. In 1992 and 1993, he lived in post-communist Berlin to study German reunification. He frequently visited Canada to observe politics of Montreal. He was openly gay.

Vaillancourt had an impeccable committee attendance record, so it was noticed that he did not appear at the legislature on March 22, 2017. He could not be reached by phone. Someone immediately investigated his Manchester home and discovered that he had died. The exact date and cause of death are unknown.
