= Foose =

Foose may refer to:

== People ==
- Chip Foose, American automobile designer, founder of Foose Design
- Kimetrius Foose, American rapper known as Lil Skies
- Robert Foose, American politician
- Martha Hall Foose, American chef
- Sam Foose, American automobile designer, father of Chip Foose

== Other uses ==
- Foose, Missouri, a community in the United States
- Foose ball, a tabletop game
