= Thomas Keane =

Thomas Keane may refer to:

- Tom Keane (Thomas Lawrence Keane, 1926–2001), American football player
- Tom Keane, musician in The Keane Brothers 1976–1982
- Tommy Keane (1968–2012), Irish footballer
- Thomas E. Keane (1905–1996), American politician
- Thomas P. Keane (1878–1945), American politician
- Thomas Keane (New Hampshire politician), American politician
- Rory Keane (Thomas Roderick Keane, 1922–2004), Irish footballer

== See also ==
- Thomas Kean and Thomas Kean Jr.
- Tom Keen (disambiguation)
- Tom Keene (disambiguation)
