= Dennis Reed =

Dennis Reed may refer to:

- Dennis Reed (Wisconsin politician)
- Dennis Reed (New Hampshire politician)
- D. J. Reed (Dennis Duane Reed Jr., born 1996), American football cornerback

== See also ==
- Dennis Reid (1943–2023), Canadian curator and art historian
