= Lars Christiansen =

Lars Christiansen may refer to:

- Lars Christiansen (handballer) (born 1972), Danish team handball player
- Lars Christiansen (politician), member of the New Hampshire House of Representatives
- Lars Christiansen (sailor) from H-boat World Championship
