= Claire Rouillard =

American politician

Member of the New Hampshire House of Representatives from the 6th Hillsborough district
- In office December 2, 2020 – December 7, 2022
- Preceded by: Cole Riel
- In office December 3, 2014 – December 5, 2018
- Preceded by: John Hikel
- Succeeded by: Cole Riel

Personal details
- Born: Pelham, New Hampshire
- Party: Republican
- Spouse: David
- Education: Notre Dame College (BS); University of New Hampshire (JD)

Claire D. Rouillard is an American lawyer and politician who serves as a member of the New Hampshire House of Representatives.
