= Michael Farley =

Michael Farley may refer to:

- Michael F. Farley (1863–1921), American politician in New York
- Michael Farley (New Hampshire politician), American politician in New Hampshire
