= Amy Bradley =

Amy Bradley may refer to:

- Amy Lynn Bradley, American woman who disappeared in 1998
- Amy Morris Bradley, American educator
- Amy Bradley (politician), American politician
