= Gottling =

Gottling or Göttling is a surname of German origin. People with the surname include:

- Johann Friedrich August Göttling (1753–1809), German chemist
- Karl Wilhelm Göttling (1793–1869), German philologist and classical scholar
- Sue Gottling, American politician

== See also ==
- Gottlieb
