= Mark Warden =

American politician

Member of the New Hampshire House of Representatives from the Hillsborough 39th district
- Incumbent
- Assumed office December 4, 2024
- Succeeded by: Thomas Katsiantonis (elect)
- In office 2012–2014

Member of the New Hampshire House of Representatives from the Hillsborough 7th district
- In office 2010–2012

Member of the New Hampshire House of Representatives from the Hillsborough 15th district
- In office 2018 – December 7, 2022

Personal details
- Party: Republican

Mark Warden is an American politician. He serves as a Republican member for the Hillsborough 39th district of the New Hampshire House of Representatives.
