= Gates Lucas =

American politician

Member of the New Hampshire House of Representatives from the Sullivan 2 district
- In office December 5, 2018 – July 14, 2020
- Succeeded by: Sue Gottling

Personal details
- Party: Republican
- Education: Dartmouth College

Gates Lucas is a New Hampshire politician who served in the New Hampshire House of Representatives.

== Education ==
Lucas graduated from Dartmouth College.

== Career ==
On November 6, 2018, Lucas was elected to the New Hampshire House of Representatives where he represents the Sullivan 2 district. Lucas assumed office on December 5, 2018. Lucas is a Republican.

== Personal life ==
Lucas resides in Sunapee, New Hampshire.
