= Carry Spier =

American politician

Member of the New Hampshire House of Representatives from the Hillsborough 6th district
- Incumbent
- Assumed office December 7, 2022
- Preceded by: Diane Langley
- Succeeded by: Adam Thompson (elect)

Personal details
- Party: Democratic

Carry Spier is an American politician. She serves as a Democratic member for the Hillsborough 6th district of the New Hampshire House of Representatives.
