= Maxine Mosley =

American politician

Member of the New Hampshire House of Representatives from the Hillsborough 16th district
- Incumbent
- Assumed office December 2026

Personal details
- Party: Democratic

Maxine B. Mosley is an American politician, retired schoolteacher and trade union official. As a politician, she was a candidate for the New Hampshire House of Representatives in 2022 and 2024, and is a member-elect for the Hillsborough 16th district.

== Career ==
Mosley is a teacher and trade unionist. She was the vice-president of the Manchester Education Association.

Mosley first ran for office in 2022 in Hillsborough's 16th district. After initially being behind by 23 votes, Democrat Mosley defeated Republican Larry Gagne by 1 vote after a recount. However, an administrative error indicated that not all ballots had been counted in the recount and a second recount was ordered. Mosley and State Senator Donna Soucy brought a lawsuit against New Hampshire Secretary of State David Scanlan in attempt to stop the second recount, but Merrimack County Superior Court Judge Amy Ignatius ruled on November 22, 2022 that the second recount could proceed. When the second recount was concluded, Mosley had once again lost to Gagne. In 2024, she again ran for the New Hampshire House of Representative to represent Hillsborough District 39, but was defeated in the general election. She was endorsed by EMILY's List.

In 2023, she contested a special election for ward 6 in Manchester, New Hampshire.

In the 2024 United States presidential election, she launched the "Seniors for Biden-Harris" initiative in New Hampshire.

She endorsed Maura Sullivans campaign for New Hampshire's 1st congressional district in the 2026 United States House of Representatives elections.
