= Diane Langley =

American politician

Member of New Hampshire House of Representatives for Hillsborough 8
- In office December 5, 2018 – December 7, 2022
- Preceded by: Daniel Sullivan
- Succeeded by: Carry Spier

Personal details
- Party: Democratic

Diane M. Langley is an American politician. She was a member of the New Hampshire House of Representatives.

She endorsed the Pete Buttigieg presidential campaign in the 2020 Democratic Party presidential primaries.
