= Cole Riel =

American politician

Member of the New Hampshire House of Representatives from the 6th Hillsborough district
- In office December 5, 2018 – December 2, 2020
- Preceded by: Claire Rouillard
- Succeeded by: Claire Rouillard

Personal details
- Born: Cole John Riel; July 21, 1995 (age 31) Nashua, New Hampshire
- Party: Democratic
- Education: University of New Hampshire (BA)

Cole John Riel (born July 21, 1995) is an American politician who was elected in 2018 to the New Hampshire House of Representatives. In 2019, he was hired as 2020 presidential candidate Pete Buttigieg's state outreach coordinator. He decided against seeking reelection in 2020.
