= Tom Keen =

Tom, Thomas or Tommy Keen may refer to:

- Tom Keen (The Blacklist), a character on the TV series The Blacklist
- Tom Keen (politician) (born 1956), American politician
- Thomas G. Keen (1815–1887), American Baptist minister
- Thomas Keen (runner) (born 2001), British athlete

== See also ==
- Thomas Kean and Thomas Kean Jr.
- Tom Keene (disambiguation)
- Thomas Keane (disambiguation)
