= Tom Keene =

Tom, Thomas or Tommy Keene may refer to:

- Tom Keene (actor) (1896–1963), American film actor
- Tom Keene (radio host) (born 1952), American radio host associated with Bloomberg Radio
- Tommy Keene (1958–2017), American singer-songwriter
- Thomas W. Keene (1840–1898), American stage actor

== See also ==
- Thomas Kean and Thomas Kean Jr.
- Tom Keen (disambiguation)
- Thomas Keane (disambiguation)
