= Jesse Benton =

American political consultant

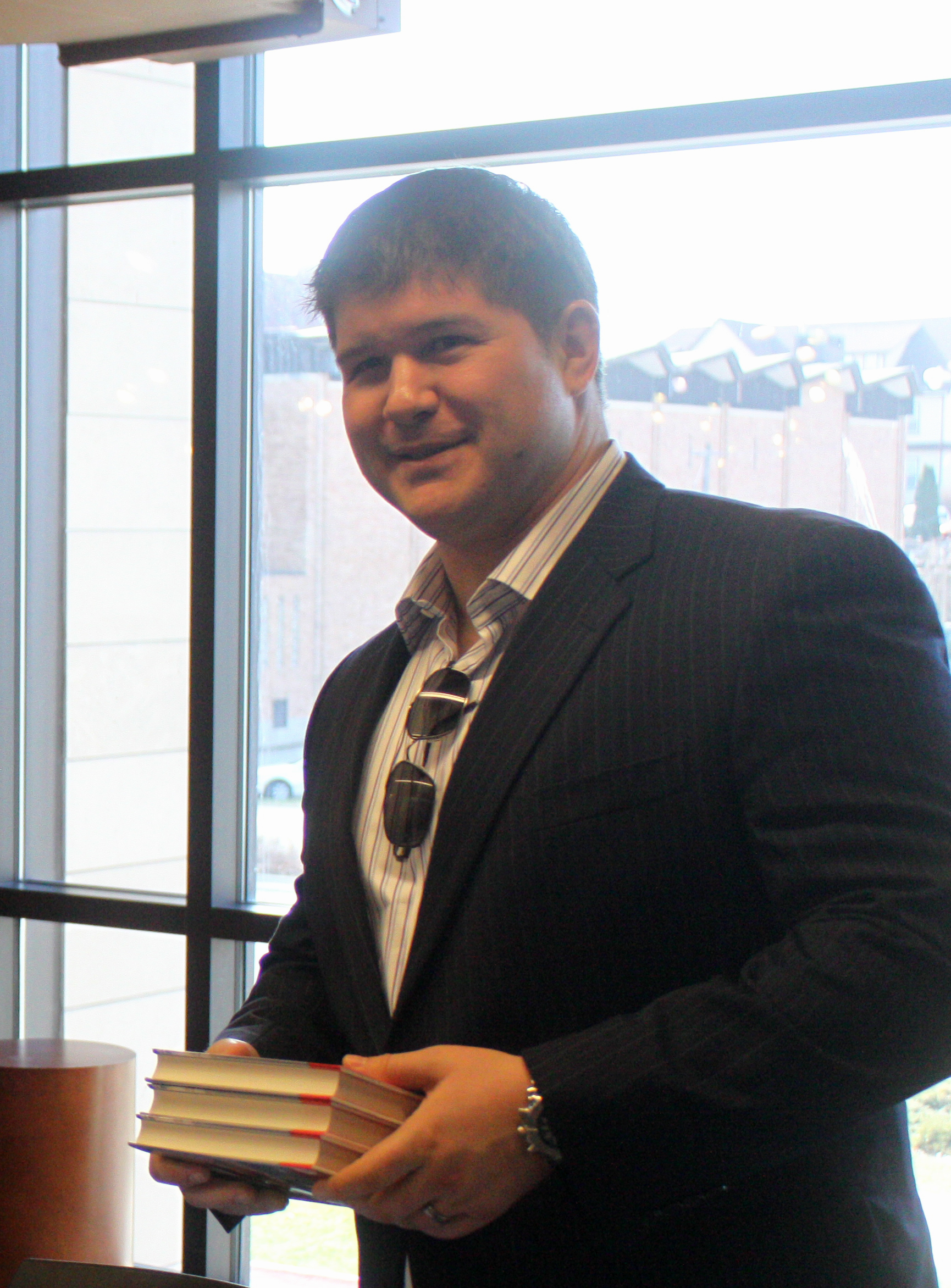
- Benton at a book signing at Iowa State University in 2011
- Born: Jesse Reeves Benton; October 4, 1977 (age 49); Philadelphia, Pennsylvania, U.S.
- Education: Mary Washington College
- Occupation: Political consultant
- Political party: Republican
- Spouse: Valori Pyeatt
- Children: 1

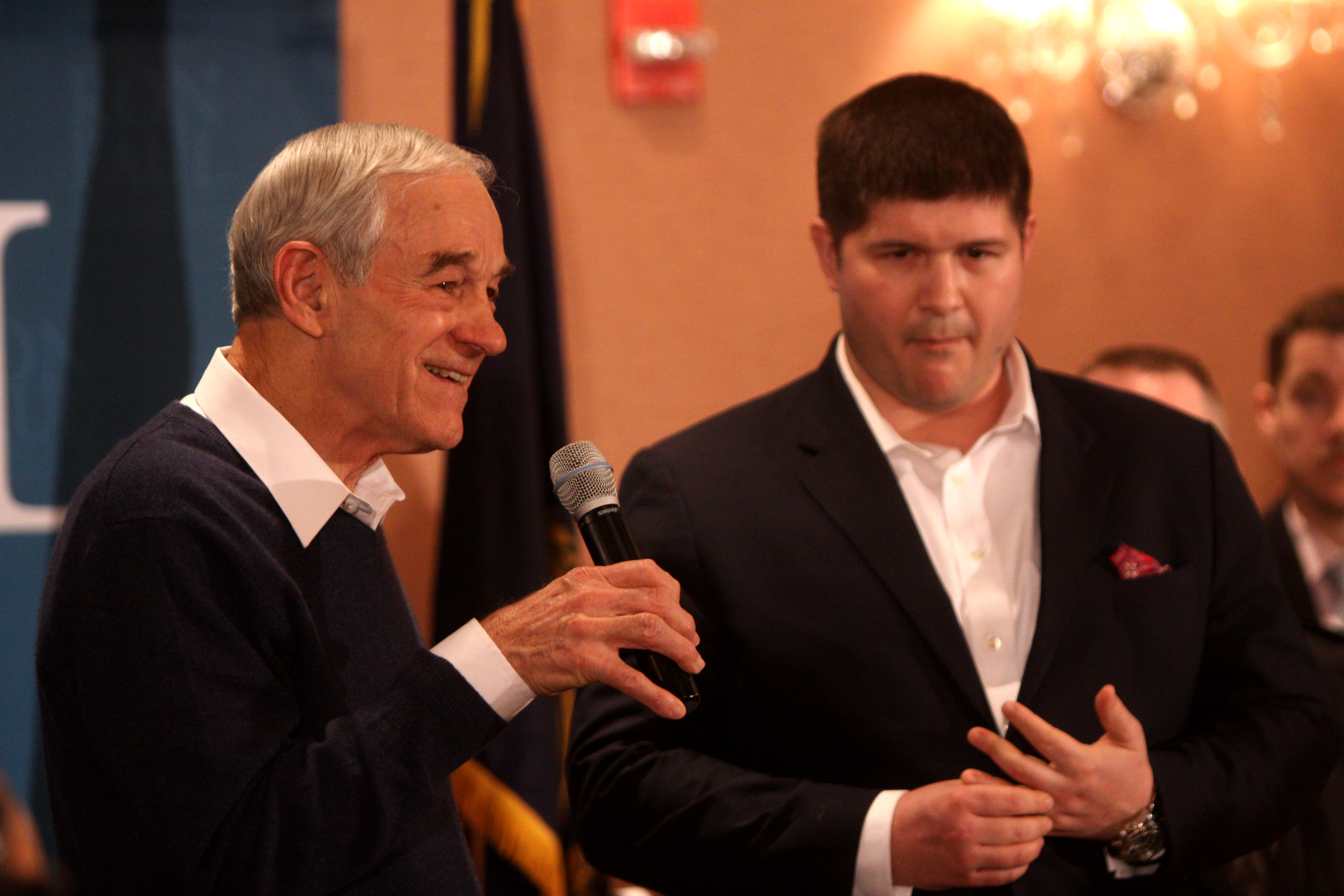
Benton with Ron Paul (2012)

Jesse Reeves Benton (born October 4, 1977) is an American political operative, convicted felon, writer, and entrepreneur. Benton is closely associated with the Paul family, having served as a campaign manager for both Ron Paul and Rand Paul. He is married to Valori Pyeatt, Ron Paul's granddaughter.

Benton served as the campaign manager of Republican Mitch McConnell, until resigning on August 29, 2014, amid rumors surrounding campaign finance allegations during the 2012 presidential election. On August 5, 2015, Benton was indicted by a grand jury on charges arising from an alleged coverup to conceal the expenditure of campaign money to hire an Iowa politician. Four of the five charges were initially thrown out because of misconduct by the prosecutor. Benton was found not guilty at trial on charges of making false statements.

Benton was subsequently re-indicted and was found guilty of conspiring to provide false records to the Federal Election Commission. Benton was given two years probation. He was pardoned by President Donald Trump on December 23, 2020.

Benton was indicted in September 2021 for illegally funneling money he received from a Russian national into the 2016 campaign of Donald Trump. Benton was convicted on November 17, 2022, and sentenced to 18 months in prison on February 17, 2023.

== Career ==
Benton's political career began in 2000 when he worked with the Republican National Committee. Benton has been involved with various political candidates and organizations, including the American Conservative Union, Americans for Tax Reform, the Liberty Coalition, the Performance Institute, and Louisiana Senator David Vitter. Benton opened his own political firm, CIC solutions, working mostly in Pennsylvania and Virginia. In 2007, Benton became involved with Ron Paul's 2008 presidential candidacy. Benton started out as a volunteer, being attracted by Paul's message on spending, civil liberties, and foreign policy, but eventually became Paul's communications director.

After the end of Ron Paul's 2008 campaign, Benton joined the Campaign for Liberty, a political organization founded by Ron Paul to advocate for his political message.

In March 2016, Benton was hired by the pro-Trump "Great America" super PAC.

=== Rand Paul campaign ===
In 2010, Benton served as Rand Paul's campaign manager when Paul was elected Senator of Kentucky. Benton simultaneously served as Ron Paul's political director. Rand Paul had never run for office before, and was seen as an underdog. Benton and Rand Paul became close, with the two speaking nearly every day and Benton moving into Paul's basement. Rand Paul's ultimately victorious campaign was praised for its use of the internet fundraising and recruiting, and Paul's ability to knock off a more established candidate was described by a Republican strategist as establishing a new norm for Republican primaries.

=== Ron Paul presidential campaign ===
After Rand Paul's election, Benton worked on Ron Paul's 2012 presidential campaign. During the campaign, Benton urged Paul's delegates at the 2012 Republican National Convention to act with "decorum and respect."

Benton has been criticized by some Ron Paul supporters who see Benton as being overly concerned with his own career, incompetent, and not truly a "hardcore Paulite." Thomas Woods, an historian, political analyst, and former Ron Paul adviser, criticized Benton for what he saw as downplaying Ron Paul's libertarian ideals in order to earn "GOP respectability," a notion echoed by other Paul supporters.

In August 2012, conservative activist and former fired 2008 Ron Paul staffer Dennis Fusaro released emails and phone conversations that implicated Benton in being involved in an attempt to hire Iowa state senator Kent Sorenson in order to secure Sorenson's support of Ron Paul's presidential campaign. Sorenson initially worked for Michele Bachmann's candidacy, but switched his support to Paul, prompting Bachmann to accuse the Paul campaign of buying Sorenson. Sorenson resigned after a special investigator found it "manifestly clear" he violated Iowa Senate ethics rules by accepting money and then denying he'd done so.

Fusaro then released a phone conversation regarding Benton's employment with the McConnell campaign, in which Benton said he was "sort of holding my nose for two years because what we're doing here is going to be a big benefit for Rand in 2016." The incident was referred to on Twitter as "nosegate." In response to Fusaro's actions, Benton stated, ""It is truly sick that someone would record a private phone conversation I had out of kindness and use it to try to hurt me. I believe in Senator McConnell and am 100 percent committed to his re-election. Being selected to lead his campaign is one of the great honors of my life and I look forward to victory in November of 2014." The McConnell campaign stated that Benton would "absolutely" keep his job with the campaign.

Although Paul was not nominated, Benton praised Paul's followers for helping to elect Paul supporters to positions of leadership within the GOP.

=== Mitch McConnell campaign ===
After the 2012 presidential election, Benton agreed to serve as Senate Minority Leader Mitch McConnell's campaign manager for his 2014 re-election campaign. In hiring Benton, McConnell hoped to avoid a Republican primary from a conservative challenger, although Tea Party Republican Matt Bevin would ultimately challenge McConnell. The move was notable as McConnell had endorsed Paul's 2010 Republican primary opponent, Trey Grayson, and McConnell represented the "establishment" wing of the Kentucky Republican party while Benton's background was in "grassroots" advocacy.

The move, which was followed by Rand Paul endorsing McConnell's re-election, began a political alliance between the two Republican Senators from Kentucky. Benton views his working with McConnell as part of a goal to unite different factions of Republicans, saying that "it's a really, really important mission to bring all Republicans and conservatives together." Benton helped Rand Paul gain McConnell's approval of Paul's noted filibuster of future CIA Director John O. Brennan, in which Paul criticized the Obama Administration's use of combat drones.

Benton resigned his post as Mitch McConnell's campaign manager in August 2014 when details of a campaign filing scandal from Paul's 2012 presidential campaign came to light.

== Political views ==
Benton has described himself as both a political operative and activist. Benton views his role as helping to bring the "voice" of the Tea Party into a governing coalition. Benton is an adherent of the Austrian School of Economics, believing that "The market can always do better. Ultimately the market is the best way to provide things to society." Benton has contributed money to Ron Paul, Rand Paul, Texas Senator Ted Cruz, Kurt Bills, the National Republican Congressional Committee, and the Louisville and Jefferson County Republican Executive Committee. In 2013, Benton sent out an email that claimed that Barack Obama wanted to create a national gun registration system; the claim was criticized by The Washington Post's fact-checker.

== Legal issues ==
=== 2015 indictment and acquittal ===
Benton was indicted for allegedly concealing over $70,000 in payments to Iowa state senator Kent Sorenson to convince Sorenson to change his endorsement from Michele Bachmann to Ron Paul, a longtime Texas congressman. The indictment charged Benton and two other defendants with conspiracy, causing false records to obstruct a contemplated investigation, causing the submission of false campaign expenditure reports, concealing these payments from the Federal Election Commission and the FBI, and perjury. All but one of the charges against Benton were thrown out by an Iowa judge for prosecutorial misconduct, and he was acquitted at trial of the only remaining charge.

=== 2016 conviction and pardon ===
December 2020 pardon granted by Donald Trump

The government was able to re-indict Benton on the dismissed charges, and he stood for a second trial. On May 5, 2016, a federal jury in Des Moines found Benton guilty of four federal crimes: conspiracy, causing false records, causing false campaign expenditure reports and making false statements. Campaign managers Jesse Benton, John Tate and Demetrios Kesari were all found guilty of covering of conspiracy. Benton was sentenced to two years probation.

With the support of Rand Paul and FEC Commissioner Lee Goodman, Benton was given a full pardon by Donald Trump on December 23, 2020.

=== September 2021 indictment and conviction ===
On September 20, 2021, the United States Department of Justice announced that Benton (along with Doug Wead) had been indicted. Benton and Wead were both charged with one count of conspiracy to solicit and cause an illegal campaign contribution by a foreign national, effect a conduit contribution, and cause false records to be filed with the FEC, one count of contribution by a foreign national, one count of contribution in the name of another and three counts of making false entries in an official record, all related to contributions he had made to the Trump campaign on behalf of a Russian national, the former Russian naval officer turned multilevel marketer Roman Vasilenko. Benton was convicted of all six counts on November 17, 2022. He had bought a $25,000 ticket to the Republican National Convention's (RNC) 2016 event on behalf of Vasilenko without disclosing his nationality to the Trump campaign. On February 17, 2023, Benton was sentenced to 18 months in prison. On April 19, 2024, he lost an appeal of that conviction.

== Personal life ==
Benton is a Philadelphia native and an alumnus of Mary Washington College, where he was an economics major and played rugby.

Benton is married to Ron Paul's granddaughter, Valori Pyeatt, and they have a daughter. The two met when Benton arranged for Pyeatt to do an interview as part of Paul's presidential campaign. In addition to doing interviews for the Paul campaign, Pyeatt has also helped to organize fundraising receptions. Pyeatt is the daughter of Lori Pyeatt, Ron Paul's daughter who also worked on his campaign.
