= Michael Whalley =

American politician (1953–2008)

Michael D. Whalley

Minority Leader of the New Hampshire House of Representatives
- In office ??? – March 1, 2008
- Succeeded by: David Hess (Acting)

Member of the New Hampshire House of Representatives from the Belknap 5 district
- In office 1992–2008

Personal details
- Born: November 16, 1953 Boston, Massachusetts
- Died: March 1, 2008 (aged 54) Concord, NH
- Party: Republican
- Spouse: Purr
- Children: John, Caitlin
- Profession: Politician, Small business owner

Michael D. Whalley (November 16, 1953 – March 1, 2008) was a Republican member of the New Hampshire House of Representatives, he lived in Alton Bay, New Hampshire and represented the Belknap 5th District since 2002, after having served the towns of Bow and Dunbarton since 1992. He served as the House Republican Leader during the 2007–2008 House session until his death on March 1, 2008. Whalley had previously served as Vice Chairman of the Resources, Recreation & Development Committee, Vice Chairman and later Chairman of the Election Law Committee, Majority Whip and Deputy Speaker.

After graduating from the University of New Hampshire in 1975 with a degree in Business Administration, Mike went into business as a motorcycle and powersport vehicle dealer at HK Powersports with his brothers, Steven and Jim. He married his college sweetheart, Purr Gow, in 1977 and had twins, John and Caitlin, in 1981. In October 2007, he was diagnosed with a glioblastoma. He died at Concord Hospital from complications of injuries caused by an accidental slip on the ice outside his home.
