= Jim Splaine =

American politician

James Raymond Splaine (born August 7, 1947) is an American politician and businessman, who served in the New Hampshire House of Representatives and the New Hampshire State Senate as a member of the Democratic Party.

Born in Portsmouth, New Hampshire, Splaine received his bachelor's degree in political science and education from University of New Hampshire. He served on the Portsmouth City Council and as the assistant-mayor of Portsmouth. He also served on the Portsmouth School Board and was a Democrat. Splaine served in the Senate from 1979 to 1985, and in the House of Representatives from 1969 to 1971, 1973 to 1978, 1994 to 1996 and 1999 to 2011.

During his political career, Splaine came out as gay. He was one of the sponsors of the bill that legalized same-sex marriage in New Hampshire in 2009.
