= Moe Villeneuve =

American politician (1932–2020)

Member of New Hampshire House of Representatives for Hillsborough 7
- In office 2004–2014

Personal details
- Born: January 13, 1932 Bedford, New Hampshire, U.S.
- Died: March 19, 2020 (aged 88) Bedford, New Hampshire, U.S.
- Party: Republican

Maurice R. "Moe" Villeneuve (January 13, 1932 – March 19, 2020) was an American politician. He represented Hillsborough 7th district on the New Hampshire House of Representatives from 2004 to 2014. Villeneuve died in Bedford, New Hampshire, on March 19, 2020, at the age of 88.
