= George Katsiantonis =

American politician

Member of the New Hampshire House of Representatives from the Hillsborough 17th district
- In office 2006–2010
- In office 2012–2014

Personal details
- Party: Democratic
- Relatives: Thomas Katsiantonis (brother)

George Katsiantonis is an American politician. He served as a Democratic member for the Hillsborough 17th district of the New Hampshire House of Representatives.
