= Kathleen Hoelzel =

American politician (born 1943)

Member of the New Hampshire House of Representatives from the Rockingham 3 district
- In office 2008 – December 2, 2020
- Succeeded by: Dustin Dodge

Personal details
- Born: March 31, 1943 (age 83)
- Party: Republican
- Occupation: retired nurse

Kathleen Hoelzel (born March 31, 1943) is an American politician in the state of New Hampshire. She is a member of the New Hampshire House of Representatives, sitting as a Republican from the Rockingham 3 district (Raymond), having been first elected in 2008. She previously served from 1988–1992.
