= Edward Butler (New Hampshire politician) =

American politician (born 1949)

Member of the New Hampshire House of Representatives from the Carroll 7th district
- In office 2006 – December 2, 2020
- Succeeded by: Chris McAleer

Personal details
- Born: October 11, 1949 (age 76) Little Falls, New York
- Party: Democratic
- Education: Boston University, New York University

Edward Butler (born October 11, 1949) is an American politician who was a Democratic member of the New Hampshire House of Representatives, representing the Carroll 7th District (Albany, Bartlett, Chatham, Conway, Eaton, Freedom, Hale's Location, Hart's Location, Jackson, Madison, and Tamworth) from 2006 to 2020.

Butler is openly gay. A resident of Hart's Location, Butler and his husband own and operate the town's Notchland Inn.
