= Amy Bradley (politician) =

American politician

Member of the New Hampshire House of Representatives from the Hillsborough 43rd district
- In office 2020 – December 7, 2022
- Preceded by: Richard Komi

Member of the New Hampshire House of Representatives from the Hillsborough 41st district
- Incumbent
- Assumed office December 7, 2022

Personal details
- Party: Democratic

Amy Bradley is an American politician. She serves as a Democratic member for the Hillsborough 41st district of the New Hampshire House of Representatives. In 2023, Bradley assumed the role of New Hampshire State Director at Run for Something.
