= Laurie Harding =

American politician

Member of New Hampshire House of Representatives for Grafton 13
- In office 2004–2014

Personal details
- Born: April 25, 1947 (age 79)
- Party: Democratic
- Education: Syracuse University; Boston University

Laurie Harding (born April 25, 1947) is an American politician. She represented Grafton 13th district at the New Hampshire House of Representatives from 2004 to 2014. She is a nurse by profession. In 2024, she was named to the New Hampshire Commission on Aging by Governor of New Hampshire Chris Sununu.
