= Thomas Katsiantonis =

American politician

Member of the New Hampshire House of Representatives from the Hillsborough 50th district
- In office 2003–2004

Member of the New Hampshire House of Representatives from the Hillsborough 15th district
- In office 2008–2018

Member-elect of the New Hampshire House of Representatives from the Hillsborough 39th district
- Assuming office December 2026
- Succeeding: Mark Warden

Personal details
- Born: 1972 or 1973 (age 53–54)
- Party: Democratic
- Relatives: George Katsiantonis (brother)
- Education: Southern New Hampshire University; New Hampshire Technical Institute

Thomas Katsiantonis (born 1972/1973) is an American politician. He served as a Democratic member for the Hillsborough 15th and 50th district of the New Hampshire House of Representatives.

== Life and career ==
Katsiantonis attended Southern New Hampshire University and New Hampshire Technical Institute.

Katsiantonis served in the New Hampshire House of Representatives from 2003 to 2004 and again from 2008 to 2018.
