= Priscilla Lockwood =

American politician

Member of New Hampshire House of Representatives for Merrimack 9
- In office 1998–2014

Personal details
- Born: Priscilla Parmenter; December 22, 1936 Londonderry, New Hampshire
- Died: November 11, 2019 (aged 82) Canterbury, New Hampshire
- Party: Republican
- Spouse: Alan Lockwood (1956-2015)
- Children: 5
- Education: Pinkerton Academy; University of New Hampshire

Priscilla Lockwood (née Parmenter; December 22, 1936 – November 11, 2019) was an American politician. She represented Merrimack 9th district in the New Hampshire House of Representatives from 1998 to 2014. Lockwood graduated from the University of New Hampshire with a Bachelor of Arts. She died in 2019 from pancreatic cancer.
