= Elisabeth Sanders =

American politician (1945–2020)

Member of New Hampshire House of Representatives for Rockingham 12
- In office 2004–2016
- Succeeded by: Zoe Manos

Personal details
- Born: Elisabeth Morris; December 16, 1945 Indiana, Pennsylvania
- Died: March 21, 2020 (aged 74) Danville, New Hampshire
- Party: Republican
- Education: Southern New Hampshire University

Elisabeth N. "Betsy" Sanders (née Morris; December 16, 1945 – March 21, 2020) was an American politician. She represented Rockingham 12th district in the New Hampshire House of Representatives from 2004 to 2016. She was a member of the Daughters of the American Revolution.
