= Larry Gagne =

American politician

Member of the New Hampshire House of Representatives from the Hillsborough 16th district
- Incumbent
- Assumed office December 7, 2022

Member of the New Hampshire House of Representatives from the Hillsborough 13th district
- In office December 3, 2008 – December 7, 2022

Personal details
- Party: Republican
- Education: St. Anselm College

Larry Gagne is an American politician. He serves as a Republican member for the Hillsborough 16th district of the New Hampshire House of Representatives.

== Early life ==
Gagne attended Manchester High School Central, and later attended Saint Anselm College. From 1961 to 1966, he served in the United States Navy.

== New Hampshire House of Representatives ==
In the 2022 New Hampshire House of Representatives election, he was defeated by Democrat Maxine Mosley by one vote after a recount.

== Personal life ==
Gagne resides in Manchester, New Hampshire.
