= Bernard Benn =

American politician

Member of the New Hampshire House of Representatives from the Grafton 12th district
- In office 2000–2014

Personal details
- Party: Democratic
- Education: Pratt Institute (BA); Harvard Graduate School of Design (MA)

Bernard Benn is an American politician. A Democrat, he served in the New Hampshire House of Representatives from 2012 to 2020, where he represented the Grafton 12 district.
