= Gene Charron =

American politician

Member of New Hampshire House of Representatives for Rockingham 4
- In office 2004–2014

Personal details
- Born: December 15, 1942 (age 83)
- Party: Republican

Gene Charron (born December 15, 1942) is an American politician. He represented Rockingham 4th district on the New Hampshire House of Representatives from 2004 to 2014.
