= Evalyn Merrick =

American politician (1953–2026)

Member of New Hampshire House of Representatives for Coos 2
- In office 2006–2012

Personal details
- Born: Evalyn Susan Block; July 11, 1953 Queens, New York, US
- Died: June 20, 2026 (aged 72) Merrimack, New Hampshire, US
- Party: Democratic
- Education: Castleton State College; University of Colorado; University of Vermont

Evalyn Susan Merrick (née Block; July 11, 1953 – June 20, 2026) was an American politician. She represented Coos 2nd district in the New Hampshire House of Representatives from 2006 to 2012. As a survivor of breast cancer, she was a proponent of healthcare reform and medicinal marijuana. She was also an actress and director. She was a candidate in the 2020 New Hampshire House of Representatives election. She died on June 20, 2026 from pancreatic cancer.
