= Anne Cartwright =

American politician (1946–2025)

Anne Sullivan Kirby Cartwright (February 4, 1946 – August 19, 2025) was an American politician.

== Life and career ==
Kirby was born in Providence, Rhode Island, on February 4, 1946, to parents Charles Kirby and Leone Jarvis, and raised in Tyngsborough, Massachusetts. She graduated from Lowell High School, where she was also a cheerleader. Kirby married Joseph Cartwright in 1965, and the family moved throughout the United States, namely to Louisiana, Oklahoma, Lubbock, Texas, and Tacoma, Washington, as Joseph served in the United States Air Force. Between 1979 and 1990, Anne Cartwright worked as a cross country, skiing, and track coach.

Cartwright was elected to the New Hampshire House of Representatives as a Republican in 2010, alongside Democrats Tara Sad and Lucy Weber in Cheshire District 2. Cartwright was succeeded by John Mann in 2012, and ran again against Mann in 2014, 2016, and 2018. From 2016 to 2018, Joe Cartwright was a member of the Cheshire County Commission. He lost reelection in 2018, and ran for county treasurer in 2020.

Cartwright died on August 19, 2025, at the age of 79.
