= Mary Cooney =

American politician (born 1945)

Member of New Hampshire House of Representatives for Grafton 8
- In office 2000–2016

Personal details
- Born: May 11, 1945 (age 81)
- Party: Democratic
- Education: College of Wooster

Mary R. Cooney (born May 11, 1945) is an American politician. She was a member of the New Hampshire House of Representatives and represented Grafton's 8th district.
