= Frank Sapareto =

American politician

Member of the New Hampshire House of Representatives from the Rockingham 6th district
- In office December 7, 2016 – December 5, 2018
- Preceded by: Multi-member district
- Succeeded by: Multi-member district
- In office December 5, 2012 – December 3, 2014
- Preceded by: Multi-member district
- Succeeded by: Multi-member district

Member of the New Hampshire House of Representatives from the Rockingham 5th district
- In office December 3, 2008 – December 5, 2012
- Preceded by: Multi-member district
- Succeeded by: Multi-member district
- In office December 4, 1996 – December 4, 2002
- Preceded by: Multi-member district
- Succeeded by: Multi-member district

Member of the New Hampshire Senate from the 19th district
- In office December 4, 2002 – December 1, 2004
- Preceded by: Russell Prescott
- Succeeded by: Robert Letourneau

Personal details
- Born: January 12, 1960 (age 66) Haverhill, Massachusetts
- Party: Republican

Frank Sapareto (born January 12, 1960) is an American politician who served in the New Hampshire House of Representatives from 1996 to 2002, 2008 to 2014 and 2016 to 2018. He previously served in the New Hampshire Senate from the 19th district from 2002 to 2004.
