= Neal Kurk =

American politician

Member of the New Hampshire House of Representatives from the 2nd Hillsborough district
- In office December 5, 2012 – December 5, 2018
- Preceded by: Harry Bartlett Hardwick; Daniel Donovan
- Succeeded by: Keith Erf; J. P. Marzullo

Member of the New Hampshire House of Representatives from the 7th Hillsborough district
- In office December 1, 2004 – December 5, 2012
- Preceded by: District created
- Succeeded by: Multi-member district

Member of the New Hampshire House of Representatives from the 48th Hillsborough district
- In office December 4, 2002 – December 1, 2004
- Preceded by: Multi-member district
- Succeeded by: District abolished

Member of the New Hampshire House of Representatives from the 5th Hillsborough district
- In office December 2, 1992 – December 4, 2002
- Preceded by: Elizabeth A. Moore
- Succeeded by: District abolished

Member of the New Hampshire House of Representatives from the 3rd Hillsborough district
- In office December 3, 1986 – December 2, 1992
- Preceded by: Robert L. Hyman
- Succeeded by: Maxwell D. Sargent

Personal details
- Born: June 8, 1940 (age 86)
- Party: Republican

Neal M. Kurk (born June 8, 1940) is an American politician in the state of New Hampshire. He was a member of the New Hampshire House of Representatives, sitting as a Republican from the Hillsborough 2 district, having been first elected in 1986.

Kurk is a privacy advocate and is best known for drafting a constitutional amendment enshrining privacy into the New Hampshire Constitution. The Amendment reads, "An individual’s right to live free from governmental intrusion in private or personal information is natural, essential, and inherent." The Amendment was put to a general vote and secured 81% of the vote (the vote only requiring 66% to pass) and became part of the NH Constitution. The new Amendment has been used to challenge alleged government infringements on privacy including New Hampshire's vaccine registry and other government data collection programs.
