= Robert Letourneau =

American politician

Robert J. Letourneau

Member of the New Hampshire Senate from the 19th district
- In office December 1, 2004 – December 1, 2010
- Preceded by: Frank Sapareto
- Succeeded by: James B. Rausch

Personal details
- Born: October 9, 1942 (age 83) Lawrence, Massachusetts
- Party: Republican
- Spouse: Anne-Marie

Robert J. Letourneau is a Republican former member of the New Hampshire Senate, representing the 19th District starting in 2004 and ending in 2010. Previously he was a member of the New Hampshire House of Representatives from 1996 until 2004.
