= Elaine Swinford =

American politician

Member of New Hampshire House of Representatives for Belknap 5
- In office 2008–2012

Personal details
- Party: Republican

Elaine Swinford is an American politician. She represented Belknap 5th district at the New Hampshire House of Representatives from 2008 to 2012. She was a candidate in the 2016 New Hampshire House of Representatives election. She endorsed the Chris Christie 2016 presidential campaign. She is a member of the American Legislative Exchange Council.

== See also ==
- List of members of the American Legislative Exchange Council
