= George N. Katsakiores =

American politician

Member of the New Hampshire House of Representatives from the Rockingham 7th district
- In office 1982–1992

Member of the New Hampshire House of Representatives from the Rockingham 13th district
- In office 1992–2002

Member of the New Hampshire House of Representatives from the Rockingham 77th district
- In office 2002–2004

Member of the New Hampshire House of Representatives from the Rockingham 5th district
- In office 2004 – February 1, 2010

Personal details
- Born: December 11, 1924
- Died: February 1, 2010 (aged 85)
- Party: Republican
- Spouse: Phyllis Katsakiores
- Education: University of New Hampshire

George N. Katsakiores (December 11, 1924 – February 1, 2010) was an American politician. He served as a Republican member of the New Hampshire House of Representatives.

== Life and career ==
Katsakiores attended the University of New Hampshire.

Katsakiores served in the New Hampshire House of Representatives from 1982 to 2010.

Katsakiores died on February 1, 2010, at the age of 85.
