= Christopher Ahlgren =

American politician

Member of New Hampshire House of Representatives for Carroll 6
- In office 2004–2014

Personal details
- Died: July 1, 1961
- Party: Republican
- Education: Illinois State University

Christopher J. Ahlgren (born July 1, 1961) is an American politician. He represented Carroll 6th district on the New Hampshire House of Representatives from 2012 to 2014.
