= Pamela Tucker =

American politician

Member of New Hampshire House of Representatives for Rockingham 23
- In office 2008–2016

Personal details
- Born: December 18, 1963 (age 62)
- Party: Republican
- Education: Northwood University

Pamela Tucker (born December 18, 1963) is an American politician. She was a member of the New Hampshire House of Representatives and represented Rockingham 23rd district from 2008 to 2016.
