= Baldwin Domingo =

American politician (1926–2020)

Baldwin Molina Domingo
- Born: December 8, 1926; Hamakuapoko, Hawaii
- Died: May 4, 2020 (aged 93); Wakefield, Massachusetts
- Occupations: Politician; educator

Baldwin Molina Domingo (December 8, 1926 – May 4, 2020) was an American politician and educator.

Domingo was born in Hamakuapoko, Maui County, Hawaii, to Braulio and Regina Domingo, and graduated from Maui High School. Domingo served in the United States Air Force and was commissioned a major. He received his bachelor's degrees from the University of the Philippines and Ohio State University. Domingo also received his master's degree from University of New Hampshire. He lived in Dover, New Hampshire, and taught military aviation history at Nathaniel Hawthorne College. Domingo served in the New Hampshire House of Representatives from 1998 to 2000 and again from 2004 to 2012 as a Democrat. Domingo died on 4 May 2020, in Wakefield, Massachusetts.
