= Alfred Lerandeau =

American politician

Member of the New Hampshire House of Representatives from the Cheshire 11th district
- In office 1998–2000

Member of the New Hampshire House of Representatives from the Cheshire 6th district
- In office 2006–2012

Member of the New Hampshire House of Representatives from the Cheshire 12th district
- In office 2012–2014

Personal details
- Born: August 3, 1939 (age 87)
- Party: Democratic
- Education: Keene State College

Alfred Lerandeau (born August 3, 1939), also known as Gus Lerandeau, is an American politician. He served as a Democratic member of the New Hampshire House of Representatives.

== Life and career ==
Lerandeau attended Keene State College.

Lerandeau served in the New Hampshire House of Representatives from 1998 to 2000 and again from 2006 to 2014.
