= Richard Komi =

American politician

Member of the New Hampshire House of Representatives from the Hillsborough 43 district
- In office December 5, 2018 – May 2, 2020
- Preceded by: Kathleen Souza
- Succeeded by: Amy Bradley
- In office 2008–2010

Personal details
- Party: Democratic

Richard N. Komi is an American immigrant from Nigeria who served in the New Hampshire House of Representatives as a member of the Democratic Party.

== Life ==
Komi claims to have faced political persecution as a member of the Ogoni people in Nigeria. After he spent time in a refugee camp in Benin, he was brought to Manchester, New Hampshire on September 13, 1999.

== Career ==
Komi served as a member of the New Hampshire House of Representatives where he represented the Hillsborough 43 district from 2008 to 2010. On November 6, 2018, Komi was again elected to the New Hampshire House of Representatives where he represented the same district.

In 2023, he filed to run for the Ward 5 Aldermanic seat in Manchester.

== Controversy ==
Komi faced calls for resignation in early May 2020 after claiming that the female anatomy made Tara Reade's sexual assault claim impossible without "cooperation" from Reade. He apologized for the statement and insisted that Reade's accusation was false. He resigned from office on May 2, 2020.
