= Robert Willette =

American politician

Member of New Hampshire House of Representatives for Hillsborough 23
- In office 2008–2014

Personal details
- Party: Republican

Robert F. Willette is an American politician. He is a Republican. He represented Hillsborough 23rd district on the New Hampshire House of Representatives from 2008 to 2014.
