= Carolyn Gargasz =

American politician (1938–2025)

Member of New Hampshire House of Representatives for Hillsborough 27
- In office 2000 – December 4, 2018
- Succeeded by: Michelle St. John

Personal details
- Born: January 24, 1938 Aberdeen, Washington
- Died: January 31, 2025 (aged 87) New Hampshire
- Party: Republican
- Education: University of Puget Sound

Carolyn Mae Gargasz (January 24, 1938 – January 31, 2025) was an American politician.

== Biography ==
Gargasz was born on January 24, 1938, in Aberdeen, Washington to Arthur Cox and Gladys (Carpenter) Cox. She attended the University of Puget Sound in Tacoma, Washington. She was a member of the New Hampshire House of Representatives and represented Hillsborough's 27th district. She served as vice president for Public Policy for Family and Community Education and was an active member of the National Task Force on Television Violence. She was a member of the Daughters of the American Revolution.
