= Martha Hall Foose =

American chef and author

Martha Hall Foose is an American chef and author from Mississippi.

== Early life and education ==
As a child, Foose attended school in Yazoo City, MS. She later attended Jackson Academy and then St. Andrew's Episcopal School in Ridgeland, Mississippi. She went on to attend École Lenôtre in France before returning to her native Mississippi.

== Career ==
Foose opened Bottletree Bakery in Oxford, Mississippi in the 1990s. After opening Bottletree Bakery, she and her husband moved to Minneapolis, where she worked for Pillsbury as a writer and editor of cookbooks.

In the late 2000s she moved back to Mississippi, where she opened Mockingbird Bakery in Greenwood. From 2011 until 2021 Foose worked as an executive chef at the Viking Cooking School.

Foose was a food stylist for the movie The Help.

== Personal life ==
Foose currently lives in Hattiesburg, Mississippi. She previously lived at Pluto Plantation, her family farm near Greenwood and Tchula, Mississippi. The land previously belonged to her grandmother. She is married to Donald Bender, whom she met after opening Bottletree Bakery; the couple have one son.

== Books ==
- Screen Doors and Sweet Tea: Recipes and Tales from a Southern Cook (2008), winner of the 2009 James Beard Book Award
- A Southerly Course: Recipes, Stories from Close to Home (2011), nominee for the James Beard Book Award
- I Cook in Color: Bright Flavors From My Kitchen and Around the World (2020), coauthored with Atlanta-based chef Asha Gomez
- A Good Meal Is Hard To Find (2020), coauthored with Amy C. Evans
