= Phyllis Katsakiores =

American politician

Member of the New Hampshire House of Representatives
- Incumbent
- Assumed office December 3, 2014
- Constituency: Rockingham 6th
- In office December 1, 1982 – December 5, 2012
- Constituency: Rockingham 5th

Personal details
- Born: September 22, 1934 (age 91) Wakefield, Massachusetts
- Party: Republican
- Spouse: George N. Katsakiores

Phyllis M. Katsakiores (born September 22, 1934) is an American politician representing the Rockingham 6 district in the New Hampshire House of Representatives since December 2014. She previously served in the House from 1982 to 2012. Katsakiores has also served on the Derry, New Hampshire Town Council multiple times: from 1985 to 1994, from 2003 to 2006, and from 2012 to 2024. Earlier in her career, Katsakiores worked as a newspaper reporter in Massachusetts and as a local grocery supervisor.
