= Daniel Sullivan (New Hampshire politician) =

American politician (born 1963)

Member of New Hampshire House of Representatives for Hillsborough 42
- In office 2006–2016
- Preceded by: Joseph Lachance
- Succeeded by: Diane Langley

Personal details
- Born: June 3, 1963 (age 63)
- Party: Democratic

Daniel Sullivan (born June 3, 1963) is an American politician. He was a member of the New Hampshire House of Representatives representing Hillsborough's 10th district.
