= Lawrence Kappler =

American politician

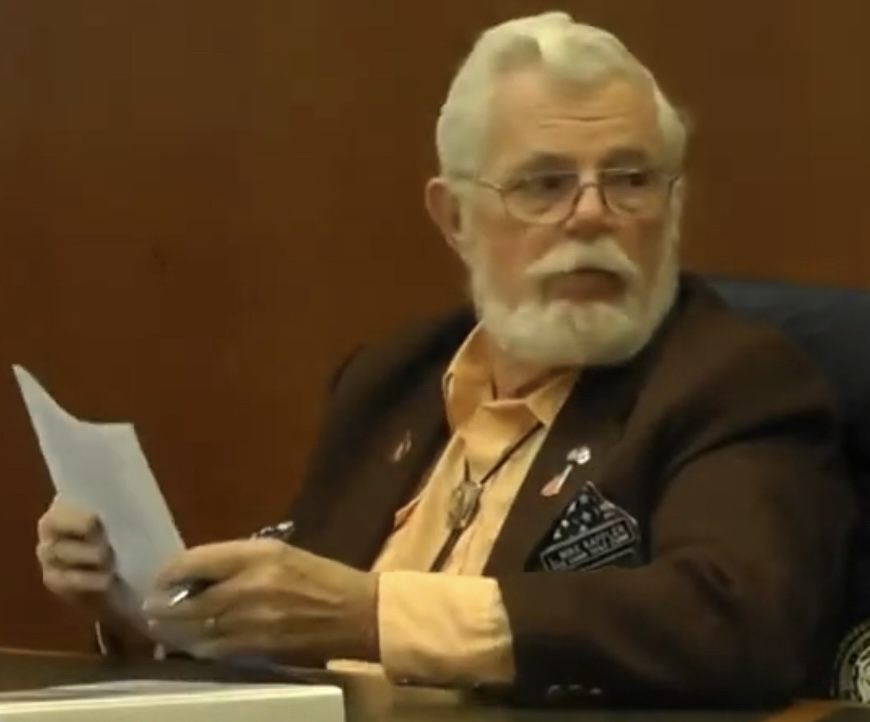
- Kappler in 2012

Member of the New Hampshire House of Representatives from the Rockingham 2nd district
- In office 2006–2012

Member of the New Hampshire House of Representatives from the Rockingham 3rd district
- In office 2012–2016

Personal details
- Born: Lawrence Michael Kappler
- Party: Republican

Lawrence Michael Kappler is an American politician. A member of the Republican Party, he served in the New Hampshire House of Representatives from 2006 to 2016.
