= Mary Gorman (politician) =

American politician

Member of New Hampshire House of Representatives for Hillsborough 31
- In office 1998–2016

Personal details
- Party: Democratic
- Education: Plymouth State College

Mary Gorman is an American politician. She was a member of the New Hampshire House of Representatives and represented Hillsborough 31st district from 1998 to 2016.
