= Michael McCarthy (New Hampshire politician) =

American politician

Member of New Hampshire House of Representatives for Hillsborough 29
- In office 2016 – December 5, 2018

Member of New Hampshire House of Representatives for Hillsborough 29
- In office 2008–2014

Personal details
- Party: Republican

Michael McCarthy is an American politician. He represented Hillsborough 29th district on the New Hampshire House of Representatives from 2008 to 2014 and again from 2016 to 2018. In the 2024 New Hampshire House of Representatives election, he was a candidate for Hillsborough 4.
