= Mary Allen (politician) =

American politician

Member of New Hampshire House of Representatives for Rockingham 15
- In office 2002–2018
- Succeeded by: Charles Melvin

Personal details
- Party: Republican

Mary M. Allen is an American politician. She was a member of the New Hampshire House of Representatives and represented Rockingham's 15th district.
