= Mary Stuart Gile =

Canadian-born American politician (1936–2019)

Member of the New Hampshire House of Representatives from the Merrimack 27 district
- In office 1996 – January 2019
- Succeeded by: Art Ellison

Personal details
- Born: March 24, 1936 Montreal, Quebec, Canada
- Died: October 15, 2019 (aged 83) Concord, New Hampshire, U.S.
- Party: Democratic
- Spouse: Robert Gile
- Education: McGill University, University of New Hampshire, Vanderbilt University
- Occupation: Professor, academic

Mary Stuart Gile (née Sinclair; March 24, 1936 – October 15, 2019) was a Canadian-born American politician from New Hampshire.

Born and raised in Montreal, Quebec, Canada, she attended public schools, and graduated from McGill University with a B.Sc. in physical education, health and recreation. She moved to the United States and became a naturalized United States citizen in 1969. She worked for the State of New Hampshire for 16 years, acquiring her M.Ed. from the University of New Hampshire and an Ed.D. in educational leadership from Vanderbilt University's George Peabody College. She married her second husband, Robert "Bob" Gile, becoming stepmother to his son, Jack. In 1976, the couple had a child together, Robert.

She was a member of the New Hampshire House of Representatives, sitting as a Democrat from the Merrimack 27 district, having been first elected in 1996.

== Death ==
Mary Stuart Gile died on October 15, 2019, of cancer, according to her husband, Bob Gile.
