= Tara Sad =

American politician

Member of the New Hampshire House of Representatives from the Cheshire 2nd district
- In office 2006 -

Personal details
- Born: October 9, 1953 (age 72) Dover, New Jersey, U.S.
- Party: Democratic

Tara Sad (born October 9, 1953) is a Democratic member of the New Hampshire House of Representatives, currently representing the 1st District, and, prior to recent redistricting, representing the 2nd District since 2006. Sad currently chairs the House Environment & Agriculture Committee, and serves on the Joint Legislative Committee on Administrative Rules (JLCAR).
