= Tim Comerford =

American politician

Member of the New Hampshire House of Representatives
- In office 2008–2014
- Constituency: Rockingham 33

Personal details
- Party: Republican

Timothy P. Comerford is an American politician from New Hampshire. He served in the New Hampshire House of Representatives.

Comerford endorsed the Ron DeSantis 2024 presidential campaign.
