= Lars Christiansen (politician) =

American politician

Member of the New Hampshire House of Representatives from the Hillsborough 23rd district
- In office 1996–2002

Member of the New Hampshire House of Representatives from the Hillsborough 66th district
- In office 2002–2004

Member of the New Hampshire House of Representatives from the Hillsborough 27th district
- In office 2004–2012

Member of the New Hampshire House of Representatives from the Hillsborough 37th district
- In office 2012–2016

Personal details
- Born: Lars Torvald Christiansen; November 21, 1933 (age 92) Saugus, Massachusetts, U.S.
- Party: Republican
- Education: Fitchburg State College

Lars Torvald Christiansen (born November 21, 1933) is an American politician. A member of the Republican Party, he served in the New Hampshire House of Representatives from 1996 to 2016.

== Life and career ==
Christiansen was born in Saugus, Massachusetts, the son of Carl and Anna Christiansen. He attended and graduated from Fitchburg State College. After graduating, he served in the United States Army, which after his discharge, he served as a member of the Hudson school board in Hudson, New Hampshire.

Christiansen served in the New Hampshire House of Representatives from 1996 to 2016.
