= John Hikel =

American politician

Member of New Hampshire House of Representatives for Hillsborough 6
- In office 2008–2014

Personal details
- Party: Republican

John Hikel is an American politician. He represented Hillsborough 6th district on the New Hampshire House of Representatives from 2008 to 2014. He was Vice Chair of the House Transportation Committee.

Hikel was the owner of an auto-repair business in Manchester. He worked on the Donald Trump 2016 presidential campaign in New Hampshire. He endorsed the Donald Trump 2020 presidential campaign. He was a member of the Board of Selectmen in Hartland, Maine.
