= Sue Gottling =

American politician

Member of the New Hampshire House of Representatives for Sullivan 2
- In office December 2, 2020 – December 7, 2022
- Preceded by: Gates Lucas
- Succeeded by: Skip Rollins

Member of the New Hampshire House of Representatives for Sullivan 3
- In office 2006–2010

Personal details
- Party: Democratic
- Education: Ohio State University

Suzanne H. "Sue" Gottling is an American politician from New Hampshire. She served in the New Hampshire House of Representatives.

In the 2018 New Hampshire House of Representatives election, she was defeated by Republican Gates Lucas.
