= Paul Ingbretson =

American politician

Member of New Hampshire House of Representatives for Grafton 15
- In office 2014–2016

Member of New Hampshire House of Representatives for Grafton 5
- In office 2008–2016

Personal details
- Party: Republican
- Website: studio.ingbretson.com

Paul Ingbretson is an American politician. He represented Grafton County in the New Hampshire House of Representatives until 2016. His 2008 campaign was endorsed by Ron Paul. He is an artist by profession.
