= Michael Farley (New Hampshire politician) =

American politician

Member of the New Hampshire House of Representatives from the Hillsborough 15th district
- Incumbent
- Assumed office December 2026
- In office 2006–2010

Personal details
- Party: Democratic

Michael Farley is an American politician. A member of the Democratic Party, he is the member-elect for the Hillsborough 15th district of the New Hampshire House of Representatives. He previously served in the House from 2006 to 2010.
