= Robert Foose =

American politician

Member of the New Hampshire House of Representatives from the Merrimack 1st district
- In office 2004–2012

Personal details
- Party: Democratic
- Education: Hamilton College; Harvard Business School

Robert Foose is a Democratic politician who served in the New Hampshire House of Representatives from 2004 to 2012, where he represented the Merrimack 18 district.
