= Laurence Rappaport =

American politician

Member of New Hampshire House of Representatives for Coös 1
- In office 2008–2016

Personal details
- Born: December 21, 1940 Brooklyn, New York
- Died: February 22, 2020 (aged 79) Canaan, New Hampshire
- Party: Republican
- Education: New York University

Laurence M. Rappaport (December 21, 1940 – February 22, 2020) was an American politician. He represented Coös County on New Hampshire House of Representatives from 2008 to 2016. Rappaport served in the United States Army in the Vietnam War.
