= David Hess (politician) =

American politician

Minority Leader of the New Hampshire House of Representatives Acting
- In office March 1, 2008 – December 2008
- Preceded by: Michael Whalley
- Succeeded by: Sherman Packard

Member of the New Hampshire House of Representatives from the Merrimack 24th district
- In office 1994 – December 2016

Personal details
- Born: June 21, 1942 (age 84) Allentown, Pennsylvania, U.S.
- Party: Republican
- Spouse: Judith Ann
- Profession: Attorney

David W. Hess is a former Republican member of the New Hampshire House of Representatives representing the 9th District since 1994.
