= Norman Tregenza =

American politician

Member of the New Hampshire House of Representatives from the Carroll 2nd district
- In office December 2010 – May 2012

Personal details
- Party: Republican

Norman Tregenza from Conway, New Hampshire is a Republican former member of the New Hampshire House of Representatives. He represented the Carroll 2nd district from 2010 to 2012. He is also an occasional substitute teacher for Kennett High School in Conway.

== Committee assignments ==
=== 2011-2012 ===
In the 2011–2012 legislative session, Tregenza was appointed to the Judiciary Committee, New Hampshire House. Norman Tregenza resigned in May 2012.

== Elections ==
=== 2010 ===
On November 2, 2010, Tregenza won the election to the New Hampshire House of Representatives.

== Campaign donors ==
=== 2010 ===
In 2010, a year in which Tregenza was up for re-election, he did not collect any money in donations.
