= David Campbell (New Hampshire politician) =

American politician (born 1957)

David Campbell (born October 3, 1957) is an American politician from the state of New Hampshire. A member of the Democratic Party, he served in the New Hampshire House of Representatives.

Campbell is an attorney from Nashua, New Hampshire. He graduated from Harvard College and Suffolk University Law School. In 2013, Nashua police investigated him for running over some ducks at the Crowne Plaza Hotel in Nashua.

New Hampshire House of Representatives
Preceded by Jay S. Lucas; Jesse W. Scott; Alexander P. Lewko	Member of the New Hampshire House of Representatives from the Sullivan 6th district 1978–1982	Succeeded by Mable Cutting; Larry Converse
Preceded by District created	Member of the New Hampshire House of Representatives from the Hillsborough 24th district 2004–2012	Succeeded by Jill Hammond; Peter Leishman
Preceded by District created	Member of the New Hampshire House of Representatives from the Hillsborough 33rd district 2012–2014	Succeeded by Lee Guerrette
