= Kathleen Souza =

American politician

Member of the New Hampshire House of Representatives from the 43rd Hillsborough district
- In office December 5, 2012 – December 5, 2018
- Preceded by: District created
- Succeeded by: Richard Komi

Member of the New Hampshire House of Representatives from the 11th Hillsborough district
- In office December 1, 2010 – December 5, 2012
- Preceded by: Robert M. Walsh, Jr.
- Succeeded by: Nickolas Levasseur
- In office December 1, 2004 – December 6, 2006
- Preceded by: District created
- Succeeded by: Multi-member district

Member of the New Hampshire House of Representatives from the 51st Hillsborough district
- In office December 4, 2002 – December 1, 2004
- Preceded by: District created
- Succeeded by: District abolished

Member of the New Hampshire House of Representatives from the 40th Hillsborough district
- In office December 6, 2000 – December 4, 2002
- Preceded by: Anthony "Tony" Simon
- Succeeded by: District abolished

Personal details
- Born: November 18, 1939 (age 86)
- Party: Republican
- Education: Fisher College, Suffolk University
- Occupation: teacher

Kathleen Souza (born November 18, 1939) is an American politician in the state of New Hampshire. She is a member of the New Hampshire House of Representatives, sitting as a Republican from the Hillsborough 43 district, having been first elected in 2010. She previously served from 2000–2006.
