= Carol Vita =

American politician

Member of the New Hampshire House of Representatives from the Strafford 3rd district
- In office 2010-2012

Personal details
- Party: Republican

Carol Vita is a Republican former New Hampshire state representative from the Strafford 3rd District. In 2011 she endorsed Republican presidential candidate Ron Paul.

Vita was a sponsor for a lawsuit to have Barack Obama dropped from the New Hampshire Presidential race in 2012, claiming that Obama was not born in the United States.
