= Dennis Reed (New Hampshire politician) =

American politician

Member of New Hampshire House of Representatives for Merrimack 2
- In office 2002–2014

Personal details
- Party: Republican

Dennis Reed is an American politician. He represented Merrimack 2nd district on the New Hampshire House of Representatives from 2012 to 2014.
