= Thomas Keane (New Hampshire politician) =

American politician

Member of the New Hampshire House of Representatives from the Merrimack 13th district
- In office 2010–2012

Personal details
- Party: Republican

Thomas Keane is an American politician. A member of the Republican Party, he served in the New Hampshire House of Representatives from 2010 to 2012.
