= Cameron DeJong =

American politician

Member of the New Hampshire House of Representatives from the Hillsborough 9th district
- In office 2010-2012

Personal details
- Born: October 3, 1979 (age 46) Bath, New York, U.S.
- Party: Republican
- Education: Elon University (BA)
- Profession: Managing Partner - CamJon Travel

Cameron DeJong (born October 3, 1979) is a Republican former member of the New Hampshire House of Representatives from the Hillsborough 9th District. In 2002 he received a BA in political science from Elon University. During his term in the New Hampshire House of Representatives, DeJong co-sponsored a bill promoting Approval Voting. In addition, DeJong professed his Christian faith in a Floor speech expressing support for marriage equality. DeJong did not run for re-election in 2012 citing a disgust for deal-making and lobbyist influence in politics. In 2011 he endorsed Republican presidential candidate Ron Paul. In 2016, DeJong supported Rand Paul for President..
