= Lucien Vita =

American politician

Member of the New Hampshire House of Representatives from the Strafford 3rd district
- In office 2010

Personal details
- Party: Republican

Lucien Vita is a Republican former member of the New Hampshire House of Representatives from the Strafford 3rd District. In 2011 he endorsed Republican presidential candidate Ron Paul.

Vita was a sponsor for a lawsuit to have Barack Obama dropped from the New Hampshire Presidential race in 2012, claiming that Obama was not born in the United States. Additionally, he co-sponsored a bill requiring all laws in his state to cite Magna Carta as their basis.
