= List of speakers of the New Hampshire House of Representatives =

Speaker of New Hampshire House of Representatives
- Incumbent; Sherman Packard since January 6, 2021
- Status: Presiding officer
- Seat: New Hampshire State House, Concord
- Appointer: New Hampshire House of Representatives
- Inaugural holder: Richard Waldron Jr.

The following is a list of speakers of the New Hampshire House of Representatives from colonial period and since statehood in 1788.

== Colonial period ==
Speaker	Term	Party	Residence	Notes
Richard Waldron Jr.	1684–1692		Portsmouth	
Richard Martin	1692		Portsmouth	
John Gilman	1692–1693		Exeter	
John Pickering	1693–1695		Portsmouth	
George Jaffrey	1695–1696		Portsmouth	
John Plaisted	1696–1697		Portsmouth	
John Pickering	1697–1698		Portsmouth	
Henry Dow	1698		Hampton	
John Pickering	1698–1699		Portsmouth	
Samuel Penhallow	1699–1702		Portsmouth	
John Pickering	1702		Portsmouth	
Daniel Tilton	1702–1703		Hampton	
John Pickering	1703–1709		Portsmouth	
Mark Hunking	1709–1710		Portsmouth	
Richard Garrish	1710–1717		Portsmouth	
John Plaisted	1717		Portsmouth	
Thomas Packer	1717–1719		Portsmouth	
Joshua Pierce	1719–1722		Portsmouth	
Peter Weare	1722–1727		Hampton Falls	
Nathaniel Weare	1727–1728		Hampton Falls	
Andrew Wiggin	1728–1745		Stratham	
Nathaniel Rogers	1745		Portsmouth	
Ebenezer Stevens	1745–1749		Kingston	
Richard Waldron	1749–1752		Hampton	
Meshech Weare	1752–1755		Hampton Falls	
Peter Sherburne	1755–1765		Portsmouth	
Peter Gilman	1765–1771		Exeter	
John Wentworth	1771–1776		Somersworth	
Phillips White	1776		South Hampton	
John Langdon	1776–1782		Portsmouth	
John Dudley	1782–1784		Raymond	
George Atkinson	1784–1785		Portsmouth	
John Sullivan	1785–1786		Durham	
John Langdon	1786–1787		Portsmouth	
John Sparhawk	1787		Portsmouth	

== Since statehood ==
Speaker	Term	Party	Residence	Notes
Thomas Bartlett	1787–1791		Nottingham	
William Plumer	1791–1793		Epping	
Nathaniel Peabody	1793–1794		Atkinson	
John Prentice	1794–1795		Langdon	
Russell Freeman	1795–1797		Hanover	
William Plumer	1797–1798		Epping	
John Prentice	1798–1805		Langdon	
Samuel Bell	1805–1807		Chester	
Charles Cutts	1807–1809		Portsmouth	
George B. Upham	1809–1810		Claremont	
Charles Cutts	1810–1811		Portsmouth	
Clement Storer	1811–1813		Portsmouth	
Thomas W. Thompson	1813–1815		Concord	
George B. Upham	1815–1816		Claremont	
David L. Morrill	1816–1817		Concord	
Henry B. Chase	1817–1818		Warner	
Matthew Harvey	1818–1821		Hopkinton	
Ichabod Bartlett	1821–1822		Dover	
Charles Woodman	1822–1823		Bridgwater	
Andrew Pierce	1823	Democratic	Dover	
Edmund Parker	1823–1825	Democratic	Nashua	
Levi Woodbury	1825	Democratic	Portsmouth	
Henry Hubbard	1825–1828	Democratic	Charlestown	
James Wilson Jr.	1828–1829	Democratic	Keene	
James B. Thornton	1827–1829	Democratic	Merrimack	
Samuel Webster	1829–1831	Democratic	Kingston	
Franklin Pierce	1831–1833	Democratic	Hillsborough	
Charles G. Atherton	1835–1837	Democratic	Nashua	
Ira A. Eastman	1837–1839	Democratic	Gilmanton	
Moses Norris Jr.	1839–1841	Democratic	Pittsfield	
John S. Wells	1841–1842	Democratic	Lancaster	
Samuel Swasey	1842–1844	Democratic	Haverhill	
Harry Hibbard	1844–1846	Democratic	Bath	
John P. Hale	1846–1847	Democratic	Dover	
Moses Norris Jr.	1847–1848	Democratic	Pittsfield	
Samuel H. Ayer	1848–1850		Hillsborough	
Nathaniel B. Baker	1850–1852	Democratic	Concord	
George W. Kittredge	1852–1853	Democratic	Newmarket	
Jonathan Everett Sargent	1853–1854	Republican	Wentworth	
Francis R. Chase	1854–1855	Republican	Northfield	
John J. Prentiss	1855–1856	Republican	Claremont	
Edward H. Rollins	1856–1858	Republican	Concord	
Napolean B. Bryant	1858–1860	Republican	Plymouth	
Charles H. Bell	1860–1861	Republican	Exeter	
Edward A. Rollins	1861–1863	Republican	Great Falls	
William E. Chandler	1863–1865	Republican	Concord	
Austin F. Pike	1865–1867	Republican	Franklin	
Simon G. Griffin	1867–1869	Republican	Keene	
Samuel M. Wheeler	1869–1871	Republican	Dover	
William H. Gove	1871–1872	Republican	Weare	
Asa Fowler	1872–1873	Republican	Concord	
James Emery	1873–1874	Republican	Hudson	
Albert R. Hatch	1874–1875	Republican	Portsmouth	
Charles P. Sanborn	1875–1877	Republican	Concord	
Augustus A. Woolson	1877–1879	Republican	Lisbon	
Henry H. Huse	1879–1881	Republican	Manchester	
Chester B. Jordan	1881–1883	Republican	Lancaster	
Samuel C. Eastman	1883–1885	Republican	Concord	
Edgar Aldrich	1885–1887	Republican	Colebrook	
Alvin Burleigh	1887–1889	Republican	Plymouth	
Hiram D. Upton	1889–1891	Republican	Jaffrey	
Frank G. Clarke	1891–1893	Republican	Peterborough	
Robert N. Chamberlain	1893–1895	Republican	Berlin	
Stephen S. Jewett	1895–1897	Republican	Laconia	
James F. Briggs	1897–1899	Republican	Manchester	
Frank D. Currier	1899–1901	Republican	Canaan	
Cyrus H. Little	1901–1903	Republican	Manchester	
Harry N. Cheney	1903–1905	Republican	Lebanon	
Rufus N. Elwell	1905–1907	Republican	Exeter	
Bertram Ellis	1907–1909	Republican	Keene	
Frank A. Musgrove	1911–1913	Republican	Hanover	
William J. Britton	1913–1915	Republican	Wolfeboro	
Olin H. Chase	1915	Republican	Newport	
Edwin C. Bean	1915	Republican	Belmont	
Arthur P. Morrill	1915–1919	Republican	Concord	
Charles W. Tobey	1919–1921	Republican	Temple	
Fred A. Jones	1921–1923	Republican	Lebanon	
William J. Ahern	1923–1925	Democratic	Concord	
George A. Wood	1925–1927	Republican	Portsmouth	
Harold K. Davison	1927–1929	Republican	Haverhill	
George A. Foster	1929–1931	Republican	Concord	
Harold M. Smith	1931–1933	Republican	Portsmouth	
Louis P. Elkins	1933–1935	Republican	Concord	
Amos N. Blandin	1935–1937	Democratic	Bath	
Oren V. Handerson	1937–1939	Republican	Durham	
Ansel N. Sanborn	1939–1941	Republican	Wakefield	
Charles H. Barnard	1941–1943	Republican	Manchester	
Sherman Adams	1943–1945	Republican	Lincoln	
Norris Cotton	1945–1947	Republican	Lebanon	
J. Walker Wiggin	1947–1949	Republican	Manchester	
Richard F. Upton	1949–1951	Republican	Concord	
Lane Dwinell	1951–1953	Republican	Lebanon	
Raymond K. Perkins	1953	Republican	Concord	
Norman A. McMeekin	1954	Republican	Haverhill	
Charles Griffin	1955	Republican	Lincoln	
Doug Scamman Sr.	1957–1958	Republican	Stratham	
Stewart Lamprey	1959–1965	Republican	Moultonborough	
Walter R. Peterson Jr.	1965–1969	Republican	Peterborough	
Marshall W. Cobleigh	1969–1973	Republican	Manchester	
James E. O'Neill	1973–1975	Republican	Chesterfield	
George B. Roberts Jr.	1975–1981	Republican	Alton	
John B. Tucker	1981–1987	Republican	Claremont	
Doug Scamman Jr.	1987–1990	Republican	Stratham	
Harold W. Burns	1990–1996	Republican	Whitefield	
Donna Sytek	1996–2000	Republican	Salem	
Gene Chandler	2000–2004	Republican	Bartlett	
Doug Scamman Jr.	2004–2006	Republican	Stratham	
Terie Norelli	2006–2010	Democratic	Portsmouth	
William L. O'Brien	2010–2012	Republican	Mont Vernon	
Terie Norelli	2012–2014	Democratic	Portsmouth	
Shawn Jasper	2014–2017	Republican	Hudson	
Gene Chandler	2017–2018	Republican	Bartlett	
Steve Shurtleff	2018–2020	Democratic	Concord	
Dick Hinch	2020	Republican	Merrimack	
Sherman Packard	2021–	Republican	Londonderry	

== See also ==
- List of New Hampshire General Courts
