= Frederick Jones =

Frederick Jones, or variants, may refer to:

== Businessmen ==
- Fred Jones (1892–1971), American businessman, former chairman of Braniff International Airways
- Fred Jones Jr. (born 1948), American entrepreneur and entertainment producer
- Sir Frederick Jones, 1st Baronet (1854–1936), prominent in coal mining
- Fred M. Jones (1890–1971), Jamaican planter and public figure

== Politicians ==
- Frederic Jones (politician) (1832–1890), New Zealand politician
- Fred Jones (New Zealand politician) (Frederick Jones, born Charles Frederick Benney Dunshea 1884–1966)
- Fred Jones (Mississippi politician) (died 1969)
- C. Fred Jones (1930–2015), American politician in Florida
- Fred A. Jones (1884–1964), American politician in the New Hampshire House of Representatives

== Sports ==
=== American football ===
- Fred Jones (linebacker, born 1965) (Fredrick Daniel Jones}
- Fred Jones (wide receiver) (born 1967)
- Freddie Jones (American football) (Freddie Ray Jones Jr., born 1974), tight end
- Fred Jones (linebacker, born 1977) (Fred Allen Jones Jr.)

=== Association football ===
- Fred Jones (footballer, born 1867) (Frederick William Jones, 1867–1910), Welsh international footballer
- Fred Jones (footballer, born 1888) (Frederick Jones, 1888–1945), English footballer
- Fred Jones (footballer, born 1898) (Frederick John Jones, 1898–c. 1990), English footballer
- Fred Jones (footballer, born 1909) (Frederick Jones, 1909–1994), Welsh footballer
- Fred Jones (footballer, born 1910) (Frederick R. Jones, 1910–?), English footballer
- Fred Jones (footballer, born 1922) (Frederick Arthur Jones, 1922–1989), English footballer
- Fred Jones (footballer, born 1938) (1938–2013), Welsh footballer
- Frederick Jones (footballer) (1863–?), Welsh international footballer

=== Other sports ===
- Fred Jones (Australian footballer) (Frederick George Jones, 1918–1977), Australian rules footballer
- Fred Jones (basketball) (Frederick Terrell Jones, born 1979), American basketball player
- Frederic Jones (cricketer) (Frederic John Jones, 1850–1921), English cricketer
- Fred Jones (rugby league) (Frederick Jones, 1942–2021), Australian rugby league footballer
- Frederic Jones (rugby union), English rugby union player

== Other people ==
- Frederick Edward Jones (1759–1834), Irish theatre manager
- Frederick Elwyn Jones, Baron Elwyn-Jones (1909–1989), Welsh barrister and politician
- Frederick McKinley Jones (1893–1961), African-American inventor
- Frederick S. Jones (Frederick Scheetz Jones, 1862–1944), American university professor, dean, and college football coach
- Frederic Wood Jones (1879–1954), British anthropologist
- Freddie Jones (Frederick Charles Jones, 1927–2019), English actor
- Freddy Jones (Frederick Nelson Jones, 1881–1962), New Zealand saddler, photographer, amusement park owner and inventor

== Fictional characters ==
- Fred Jones (Scooby-Doo)
- Fred Jones, one of the Howling Commandos in Marvel comic books
- Freddy Jones, in School of Rock
- Fred Jones, a character in two Ben Folds songs

== See also ==
- Freddy Jones Band, an American roots rock band
