= 1972 Oregon State Senate election =

- November 7, 1972

15 of 30 seats in the Oregon State Senate 16 seats needed for a majority

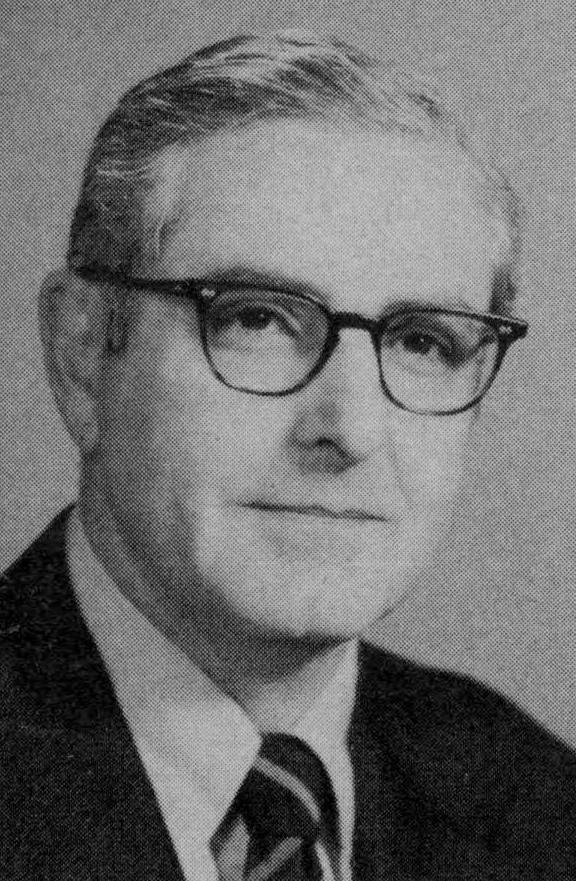
| | Majority party | Minority party |
|---|---|---|
| Leader | John Burns (retired as leader) | Victor Atiyeh |
| Party | Democratic | Republican |
| Leader's seat | 11th district (Note: Redistricted from the 12th district) | 4th district (Note: Redistricted from the 9th district) |
| Seats before | 16 | 14 |
| Seats won | 10 | 5 |
| Seats after | 18 | 12 |
| Popular vote | 245,127 | 158,664 |
| Percentage | 59.19% | 38.31% |
- Results by party Democratic gain Democratic hold Republican gain Republican hold No election
Senate President before election
John Burns
Democratic
Elected Senate President
Jason Boe
Democratic

Elections to the Oregon State Senate were held on November 7, 1972, to elect 15 candidates to the Senate to serve four-year terms. The Democratic Party won 10 seats to the Republicans' 5, resulting in a Senate composition of 18 Democrats and 12 Republicans, with a net gain of 2 for the Democrats. Of the 18 Democrats in the 1973 Legislature, 16 were liberals, flipping Senate leadership control from the conservative Democrat–Republican coalition for the first time since the mid-1950s.

At the opening of the 1973 session on January 8, liberal Democrat Jason Boe of Reedsport was elected Senate President with the support of the entire Democratic caucus, including Debbs Potts and John Burns, who had both previously served as President during legislatures under the conservative coalition.

As a result of redistricting following the 1970 United States census, the entire state legislative map was shuffled, transforming the Oregon Senate's 1960s plan of multi-member, single-member, and floterial districts into a thirty-district single-member plan.

== Reapportionment ==
Both chambers of the Oregon Legislative Assembly were reapportioned following the 1970 census. Starting with the 1972 general election, every state legislator would be elected from a single-member district; the Senate member count was kept at 30. State legislative boundaries would no longer strictly follow county lines.

=== District changes ===
| Senator (1971) | Party | Old district | Counties represented (1971) | Outcome | Senator (1973) | Party | New district | Counties represented (1973) |
|---|---|---|---|---|---|---|---|---|
| Keith A. Burbidge | Democratic | 1 | Marion | Holdover senator | Keith A. Burbidge | Democratic | 17 | Marion (part), Polk (part) |
| Wallace P. Carson Jr. | Republican | 1 | Marion | Holdover senator | Wallace P. Carson Jr. | Republican | 16 | Linn (part), Marion (part) |
| Hector Macpherson Jr. | Republican | 2 | Linn | Holdover senator | Hector MacPherson Jr. | Republican | 19 | Benton (part), Linn (part) |
| Edward Fadeley | Democratic | 3 | Lane | Holdover senator | Edward N. Fadeley | Democratic | 20 | Lane (part) |
| Betty Browne | Democratic | 3 | Lane | Holdover senator | Elizabeth Browne | Democratic | 22 | Douglas (part), Lane (part) |
| George F. Wingard | Republican | 3 | Lane | Holdover senator | George Wingard | Republican | 21 | Lane (part) |
| Jason Boe | Democratic | 4 | Douglas | Re-elected | Jason Boe | Democratic | 23 | Douglas, Josephine (part) |
| L. W. Newbry | Republican | 5 | Jackson | Holdover senator | Lynn Newbry | Republican | 26 | Jackson (part), Klamath (part) |
| Debbs Potts | Democratic | 6 | Josephine | Re-elected | E. D. (Debbs) Potts | Democratic | 25 | Jackson (part), Josephine (part) |
| Sam Dement | Republican | 7 | Coos, Curry | Lost re-election | Jack D. Ripper | Democratic | 24 | Coos, Curry |
| Tom Hartung | Republican | 8 | Washington, Yamhill | Holdover senator | Tom Hartung | Republican | 3 | Washington (part) |
| Victor Atiyeh | Republican | 9 | Washington | Re-elected | Victor Atiyeh | Republican | 4 | Washington (part) |
| C. R. Hoyt | Republican | 10 | Benton, Polk | Holdover senator | Dick Hoyt | Republican | 18 | Benton (part), Polk (part) |
| Richard E. Groener | Democratic | 11 | Clackamas | Holdover senator | Richard E. Groener | Democratic | 14 | Clackamas (part) |
| George Eivers | Republican | 11 | Clackamas | Holdover senator | George Eivers | Republican | 13 | Clackamas (part) |
| Don S. Willner | Democratic | 12 | Multnomah | Retired to run for U.S. Senate | District dismantled | | | |
| Harl H. Haas Jr. (Note: Appointed to replace Berkeley Lent) | Democratic | 12 | Multnomah | Retired to run for Multnomah County district attorney | District dismantled | | | |
| Jack Bain | Democratic | 12 | Multnomah | Lost renomination | Keith Burns | Democratic | 6 | Multnomah (part) |
| Vernon Cook | Democratic | 12 | Multnomah | Re-elected | Vernon Cook | Democratic | 12 | Multnomah (part) |
| Betty Roberts | Democratic | 12 | Multnomah | Re-elected | Betty Roberts | Democratic | 10 | Multnomah (part) |
| Tom Mahoney | Democratic | 12 | Multnomah | Holdover senator | Tom Mahoney | Democratic | 9 | Multnomah (part) |
| Ted Hallock | Democratic | 12 | Multnomah | Holdover senator | Ted Hallock | Democratic | 5 | Multnomah (part) |
| John D. Burns | Democratic | 12 | Multnomah | Holdover senator | John D. Burns | Democratic | 11 | Multnomah (part) |
| W. Stan Ouderkirk | Republican | 13 | Lincoln, Tillamook | Re-elected | W. Stan Ouderkirk | Republican | 2 | Benton (part), Lane (part), Lincoln, Polk (part), Tillamook, Washington (part), Yamhill |
| Bill Holmstrom | Democratic | 14 | Clatsop, Columbia | Holdover senator | Bill Holmstrom | Democratic | 1 | Clatsop, Columbia, Washington (part) |
| Harry D. Boivin | Democratic | 15 | Klamath | Retired | District dismantled | | | |
| Anthony Yturri | Republican | 16 | Baker, Grant, Harney, Malheur | Retired | Robert F. Smith | Republican | 30 | Baker, Crook, Grant, Harney, Lake, Malheur, Wheeler |
| Raphael R. Raymond | Republican | 17 | Umatilla, Union, Wallowa | Retired | Michael Thorne | Democratic | 29 | Umatilla, Union, Wallowa |
| Kenneth Jernstedt | Republican | 18 | Gilliam, Hood River | Re-elected | Kenneth A. Jernstedt | Republican | 28 | Clackamas (part), Gilliam, Hood River, Jefferson, Linn, Marion, Morrow, Sherman, Wasco |
| Gordon W. McKay | Republican | 19 | Crook, Deschutes, Jefferson, Lake | Lost re-election | Fred W. Heard | Democratic | 27 | Deschutes, Klamath (part) |
| New district | | | | | Tony Meeker | Republican | 15 | Clackamas (part), Marion (part), Yamhill |
| New district | | | | | Norman R. Howard | Democratic | 7 | Multnomah (part) |
| New district | | | | | Bill Stevenson | Democratic | 8 | Multnomah (part) |

== Summary ==
Partisan makeup following the 1970 election
Republican
Democratic
Split delegation

Partisan makeup following the 1972 election
Republican
Democratic

== District 2 ==
Senate District 2 contained all of Lincoln, Tillamook, and Yamhill counties, and parts of Benton, Lane, Polk, and Washington counties.

District 2 Democratic primary election
| Party | Candidate | Votes | % |
|---|---|---|---|
| Democratic | David Karl Schaefer | 6,457 | 65.07% |
| Democratic | Lester E. Fultz | 3,450 | 34.77% |
| Write-in | | 16 | 0.16% |
| Total votes | | 9,923 | 100.00% |

District 2 Republican primary election
| Party | Candidate | Votes | % |
|---|---|---|---|
| Republican | W. Stan Ouderkirk (incumbent) | 7,387 | 99.72% |
| Write-in | | 21 | 0.28% |
| Total votes | | 7,408 | 100.00% |

District 2 election
| Party | Candidate | Votes | % |
|---|---|---|---|
| Republican | W. Stan Ouderkirk (incumbent) | 15,234 | 54.32% |
| Democratic | David Karl Schaefer | 12,813 | 45.67% |
| Write-in | | 7 | 0.02% |
| Total votes | | 28,054 | 100.00% |

== District 4 ==
Senate District 4 contained parts of Washington County.

District 4 Democratic primary election
| Party | Candidate | Votes | % |
|---|---|---|---|
| Democratic | Delbert G. Knapp | 8,009 | 100.00% |
| Total votes | | 8,009 | 100.00% |

District 4 Republican primary election
| Party | Candidate | Votes | % |
|---|---|---|---|
| Republican | Victor Atiyeh (incumbent) | 11,059 | 99.97% |
| Write-in | | 3 | 0.03% |
| Total votes | | 11,062 | 100.00% |

District 4 election
| Party | Candidate | Votes | % |
|---|---|---|---|
| Republican | Victor Atiyeh (incumbent) | 21,242 | 63.01% |
| Democratic | Delbert G. Knapp | 12,472 | 36.99% |
| Write-in | | 1 | 0.00% |
| Total votes | | 33,715 | 100.00% |

== District 6 ==
Senate District 6 contained parts of Multnomah County.

District 6 Democratic primary election
| Party | Candidate | Votes | % |
|---|---|---|---|
| Democratic | Keith Burns | 9,092 | 59.05% |
| Democratic | Jack Bain (incumbent) | 4,418 | 28.69% |
| Democratic | R. Bruce Plumb | 1,886 | 12.25% |
| Write-in | | 2 | 0.01% |
| Total votes | | 15,398 | 100.00% |

District 6 Republican primary election
| Party | Candidate | Votes | % |
|---|---|---|---|
| Republican | Oliver I. Norville | 5,306 | 63.29% |
| Republican | Betty A. Keyhoe | 3,072 | 36.64% |
| Write-in | | 6 | 0.07% |
| Total votes | | 8,384 | 100.00% |

District 6 election
| Party | Candidate | Votes | % |
|---|---|---|---|
| Democratic | Keith Burns | 18,994 | 63.31% |
| Republican | Oliver I. Norville | 10,999 | 36.67% |
| Write-in | | 5 | 0.02% |
| Total votes | | 29,998 | 100.00% |
| Democratic hold | | | |

== District 7 ==
Senate District 7 contained parts of Multnomah County.

District 7 Democratic primary election
| Party | Candidate | Votes | % |
|---|---|---|---|
| Democratic | Norman R. Howard | 7,735 | 58.33% |
| Democratic | John H. Sweeney | 5,501 | 41.49% |
| Write-in | | 24 | 0.18% |
| Total votes | | 13,260 | 100.00% |

District 7 Republican primary election
| Party | Candidate | Votes | % |
|---|---|---|---|
| Republican | Grant K. Remington | 3,653 | 52.82% |
| Republican | Walter Huss | 3,253 | 47.04% |
| Write-in | | 10 | 0.14% |
| Total votes | | 6,916 | 100.00% |

District 7 election
| Party | Candidate | Votes | % |
|---|---|---|---|
| Democratic | Norman R. Howard | 17,888 | 68.80% |
| Republican | Grant K. Remington | 8,096 | 31.06% |
| Write-in | | 36 | 0.14% |
| Total votes | | 26,020 | 100.00% |
| Democratic win (new seat) | | | |

== District 8 ==
Senate District 8 contained parts of Multnomah County.

District 8 Democratic primary election
| Party | Candidate | Votes | % |
|---|---|---|---|
| Democratic | Bill Stevenson | 12,433 | 82.73% |
| Democratic | Bob Hughes | 2,592 | 17.25% |
| Write-in | | 3 | 0.02% |
| Total votes | | 15,028 | 100.00% |

District 8 Republican primary election
| Party | Candidate | Votes | % |
|---|---|---|---|
| Republican | Leon A. Prentice | 4,037 | 99.75% |
| Write-in | | 10 | 0.25% |
| Total votes | | 4,047 | 100.00% |

District 8 election
| Party | Candidate | Votes | % |
|---|---|---|---|
| Democratic | Bill Stevenson | 21,020 | 81.48% |
| Republican | Leon A. Prentice | 4,777 | 18.52% |
| Write-in | | 4 | 0.02% |
| Total votes | | 25,801 | 100.00% |
| Democratic win (new seat) | | | |

== District 10 ==
Senate District 10 contained parts of Multnomah County.

District 10 Democratic primary election
| Party | Candidate | Votes | % |
|---|---|---|---|
| Democratic | Betty Roberts (incumbent) | 12,025 | 99.89% |
| Write-in | | 13 | 0.11% |
| Total votes | | 12,038 | 100.00% |

District 10 Republican primary election
| Party | Candidate | Votes | % |
|---|---|---|---|
| Republican | Charles L. Leubbert | 6,967 | 69.84% |
| Republican | Rod Bulloch | 3,006 | 30.13% |
| Write-in | | 3 | 0.03% |
| Total votes | | 9,976 | 100.00% |

District 10 election
| Party | Candidate | Votes | % |
|---|---|---|---|
| Democratic | Betty Roberts (incumbent) | 20,278 | 60.67% |
| Republican | Charles L. Leubbert | 13,140 | 39.32% |
| Write-in | | 4 | 0.01% |
| Total votes | | 33,422 | 100.00% |

== District 12 ==
Senate District 12 contained parts of Multnomah County.

District 12 Democratic primary election
| Party | Candidate | Votes | % |
|---|---|---|---|
| Democratic | Vern Cook (incumbent) | 8,649 | 67.12% |
| Democratic | Marvin J. Hollingsworth | 4,236 | 32.87% |
| Write-in | | 1 | 0.01% |
| Total votes | | 12,886 | 100.00% |

District 12 Republican primary election
| Party | Candidate | Votes | % |
|---|---|---|---|
| Republican | Bill Johnston | 6,946 | 99.90% |
| Write-in | | 7 | 0.10% |
| Total votes | | 6,953 | 100.00% |

District 12 election
| Party | Candidate | Votes | % |
|---|---|---|---|
| Democratic | Vern Cook (incumbent) | 18,362 | 61.58% |
| Republican | Bill Johnston | 11,447 | 38.41% |
| Write-in | | 3 | 0.01% |
| Total votes | | 29,812 | 100.00% |

== District 15 ==
Senate District 15 contained all of Yamhill County and parts of Clackamas and Marion counties.

District 15 Democratic primary election
| Party | Candidate | Votes | % |
|---|---|---|---|
| Democratic | Dewey Newton | 3,270 | 36.31% |
| Democratic | Del Coursey | 3,183 | 35.34% |
| Democratic | James H. Wakefield | 2,550 | 28.31% |
| Write-in | | 4 | 0.04% |
| Total votes | | 9,007 | 100.00% |

District 15 Republican primary election
| Party | Candidate | Votes | % |
|---|---|---|---|
| Republican | Tony Meeker | 7,271 | 73.33% |
| Republican | Whitie Baglien | 2,640 | 26.63% |
| Write-in | | 4 | 0.04% |
| Total votes | | 9,915 | 100.00% |

District 15 election
| Party | Candidate | Votes | % |
|---|---|---|---|
| Republican | Tony Meeker | 16,482 | 57.42% |
| Democratic | Dewey Newton | 12,217 | 42.58% |
| Write-in | | 1 | 0.00% |
| Total votes | | 28,700 | 100.00% |
| Republican win (new seat) | | | |

== District 23 ==
Senate District 23 contained all of Douglas County and parts of Josephine County.

District 23 Democratic primary election
| Party | Candidate | Votes | % |
|---|---|---|---|
| Democratic | Jason Boe (incumbent) | 8,856 | 99.79% |
| Write-in | | 19 | 0.21% |
| Total votes | | 8,875 | 100.00% |

District 23 Republican primary election
| Party | Candidate | Votes | % |
|---|---|---|---|
| Write-in | Jason Boe (incumbent) | 253 | 86.35% |
| Write-in | | 40 | 13.65% |
| Total votes | | 293 | 100.00% |

District 23 election
| Party | Candidate | Votes | % |
|---|---|---|---|
| Democratic | Jason Boe (incumbent) | 21,607 | 99.77% |
| Write-in | | 50 | 0.23% |
| Total votes | | 21,657 | 100.00% |

== District 24 ==
Senate District 24 contained all of Coos and Curry counties.

District 24 Democratic primary election
| Party | Candidate | Votes | % |
|---|---|---|---|
| Democratic | Jack D. Ripper | 11,629 | 99.64% |
| Write-in | | 42 | 0.36% |
| Total votes | | 11,671 | 100.00% |

District 24 Republican primary election
| Party | Candidate | Votes | % |
|---|---|---|---|
| Republican | Sam Dement (incumbent) | 6,707 | 99.90% |
| Write-in | | 7 | 0.10% |
| Total votes | | 6,714 | 100.00% |

District 24 election
| Party | Candidate | Votes | % |
|---|---|---|---|
| Democratic | Jack D. Ripper | 14,835 | 51.49% |
| Republican | Sam Dement (incumbent) | 13,971 | 48.49% |
| Write-in | | 3 | 0.01% |
| Total votes | | 28,809 | 100.00% |
| Democratic gain from Republican | | | |

== District 25 ==
Senate District 25 contained parts of Jackson and Josephine counties.

District 25 Democratic primary election
| Party | Candidate | Votes | % |
|---|---|---|---|
| Democratic | Debbs Potts (incumbent) | 5,960 | 66.59% |
| Democratic | June E. Leary | 2,987 | 33.37% |
| Write-in | | 3 | 0.03% |
| Total votes | | 8,950 | 100.00% |

District 25 Republican primary election
| Party | Candidate | Votes | % |
|---|---|---|---|
| Write-in | Debbs Potts (incumbent) | 88 | 87.13% |
| Write-in | | 13 | 12.87% |
| Total votes | | 101 | 100.00% |

District 25 election
| Party | Candidate | Votes | % |
|---|---|---|---|
| Democratic | Debbs Potts (incumbent) | 18,015 | 63.77% |
| Independent | Douglas L. Dusenberry | 10,234 | 36.22% |
| Write-in | | 5 | 0.02% |
| Total votes | | 28,254 | 100.00% |

== District 27 ==
Senate District 27 contained all of Deschutes County and parts of Klamath County.

District 27 Democratic primary election
| Party | Candidate | Votes | % |
|---|---|---|---|
| Democratic | Fred W. Heard | 10,826 | 99.45% |
| Write-in | | 60 | 0.55% |
| Total votes | | 10,886 | 100.00% |

District 27 Republican primary election
| Party | Candidate | Votes | % |
|---|---|---|---|
| Republican | Gordon W. McKay (incumbent) | 4,330 | 50.12% |
| Republican | Marv Root | 4,277 | 49.51% |
| Write-in | | 32 | 0.37% |
| Total votes | | 8,639 | 100.00% |

District 27 election
| Party | Candidate | Votes | % |
|---|---|---|---|
| Democratic | Fred W. Heard | 16,359 | 55.10% |
| Republican | Gordon W. McKay (incumbent) | 13,315 | 44.88% |
| Write-in | | 6 | 0.02% |
| Total votes | | 29,680 | 100.00% |
| Democratic gain from Republican | | | |

== District 28 ==
Senate District 28 contained all of Gilliam, Hood River, Jefferson, Linn, Marion, Morrow, Sherman, and Wasco counties, and parts of Clackamas County.

District 28 Democratic primary election
| Party | Candidate | Votes | % |
|---|---|---|---|
| Democratic | Dick Coram | 9,486 | 99.47% |
| Write-in | | 51 | 0.53% |
| Total votes | | 9,537 | 100.00% |

District 28 Republican primary election
| Party | Candidate | Votes | % |
|---|---|---|---|
| Republican | Kenneth Jernstedt (incumbent) | 7,921 | 99.66% |
| Write-in | | 27 | 0.34% |
| Total votes | | 7,948 | 100.00% |

District 28 election
| Party | Candidate | Votes | % |
|---|---|---|---|
| Republican | Ken Jernstedt (incumbent) | 14,740 | 51.90% |
| Democratic | Dick Coram | 13,655 | 48.09% |
| Write-in | | 4 | 0.01% |
| Total votes | | 28,399 | 100.00% |

== District 29 ==
Senate District 29 contained all of Umatilla, Union, and Wallowa counties.

District 29 Democratic primary election
| Party | Candidate | Votes | % |
|---|---|---|---|
| Democratic | Mike Thorne | 6,790 | 54.77% |
| Democratic | Jiggs Fisk | 4,193 | 33.82% |
| Democratic | Jay Helmstetler | 1,380 | 11.13% |
| Write-in | | 34 | 0.27% |
| Total votes | | 12,397 | 100.00% |

District 29 Republican primary election
| Party | Candidate | Votes | % |
|---|---|---|---|
| Republican | Powell Graham | 5,579 | 60.60% |
| Republican | Jack A. Woodhall | 3,461 | 37.60% |
| Write-in | | 166 | 1.80% |
| Total votes | | 9,206 | 100.00% |

District 29 election
| Party | Candidate | Votes | % |
|---|---|---|---|
| Democratic | Mike Thorne | 16,985 | 56.89% |
| Republican | Powell Graham | 12,868 | 43.10% |
| Write-in | | 2 | 0.01% |
| Total votes | | 29,855 | 100.00% |
| Democratic gain from Republican | | | |

== District 30 ==
Senate District 30 contained all of Baker, Crook, Grant, Harney, Lake, Malheur, and Wheeler counties.

District 30 Democratic primary election
| Party | Candidate | Votes | % |
|---|---|---|---|
| Democratic | Pat Davis | 7,573 | 91.20% |
| Write-in | | 731 | 8.80% |
| Total votes | | 8,304 | 100.00% |

District 30 Republican primary election
| Party | Candidate | Votes | % |
|---|---|---|---|
| Republican | Robert F. Smith | 8,397 | 99.88% |
| Write-in | | 10 | 0.12% |
| Total votes | | 8,407 | 100.00% |

District 30 election
| Party | Candidate | Votes | % |
|---|---|---|---|
| Republican | Robert F. Smith | 17,587 | 64.62% |
| Democratic | Pat Davis | 9,627 | 35.37% |
| Write-in | | 2 | 0.01% |
| Total votes | | 27,216 | 100.00% |
| Republican hold | | | |

== See also ==
- 1972 United States presidential election in Oregon
- List of Oregon Legislative Assemblies
