= Doug Scamman =

Doug Scamman may refer to:

- Doug Scamman Sr. (1915–1995), American politician, speaker of the New Hampshire House of Representatives (1957–58)
- Doug Scamman Jr. (born 1941), American politician, speaker of the New Hampshire House of Representatives (1987–90; 2004–06)
