= Jack Flanagan (New Hampshire politician) =

American politician

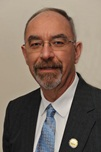

Member of the New Hampshire House of Representatives, Hillsborough 45
- Incumbent
- Assumed office December 4, 2024
- Succeeded by: Jerry Roche (elect)

Majority Leader of the New Hampshire House of Representatives
- In office December 5, 2014 – November 4, 2015
- Preceded by: Steve Shurtleff
- Succeeded by: Dick Hinch

New Hampshire House of Representatives, Hillsborough 26
- In office November 2, 2010-December 2016
- In office December 2018 - December 2020

Hillsborough County Register of Deeds
- In office December 2018 – December 2020
- Succeeded by: Mary Ann Crowell

Personal details
- Born: Jack B. Flanagan; November 23, 1957 (age 68)
- Party: Republican
- Education: Boston University; Southern New Hampshire University
- Website: Campaign website

Jack Flanagan (born November 23, 1957) is an American politician he served as the majority leader in the New Hampshire House of Representatives from 2014 to 2015.

== Biography ==
Flanagan is from Mason, New Hampshire. He is the father of three adult daughters.

Professionally, Flanagan has been employed by companies in the insurance industry, with a focus on Financial Management and Software Design/Implementation.

== Political offices ==
From 2014 to 2015, Flanagan was majority leader (second to, and appointed by Speaker Shawn Jasper) in the New Hampshire House of Representatives; due to that, Flanagan also served on the New Hampshire Republican State Committee. Flanagan is a Republican, representing Hillsborough 26 since 2010. Previously, Flanagan was on the Brookline Board of Selectmen through 2013.

During his tenure in the House, Flanagan served as Majority Leader and Vice Chairman for the Labor, Industrial, and Rehabilitative Services Committee.

He filled the one year remaining on the term of a Brookline Town Selectman who had resigned. He then successfully ran for an additional three-year term, giving him four years of service on the board. Flanagan also served a total of eight years on the Brookline Finance Committee and, in his final year, he was elected chairman by his colleagues.

During Jack's early years of service, while his children were school aged, he served on the Brookline School Board. He also served as Chairman during the final year of his two, three-year terms. In addition to serving on the Brookline School Board, Flanagan also served on the Hollis/Brookline Cooperative School Board for three years, including the final year as vice-chairman. During his nine years of service on the SAU 41 Board, a prerequisite for any school board member, Flanagan was chair during his final two years of service.

On March 29, 2016, Flanagan announced his candidacy as a Republican for United States Congress in New Hampshire's 2nd congressional district.

== Political positions ==
In August 2015, Flanagan endorsed John Kasich for president, who in September 2016 endorsed Flanagan for Congress. Jack Flanagan is a moderate Republican.

== Notes ==
- Cites:
- Jack Flanagan. "A legislative agenda of which the GOP and NH can be proud".
- http://www.brookline.nh.us/sites/brooklinenh/files/minutes/minutes-file/2011-06-06.pdf
- http://www.puc.nh.gov/Regulatory/Docketbk/2014/14-380/COMMENTS/14-380%202015-08-04%20J%20FLANAGAN%20COMMENT.PDF
- http://search.nh.gov/nhgov-search.htm?q=%22jack+flanagan%22&cmd=Search!
- Citations for personal details.
