= Neal W. Cobleigh =

American politician

Neil W. Cobleigh

Member of the New Hampshire House of Representatives from the Hillsborough 17th district
- In office 1972–1976

Personal details
- Born: June 9, 1901
- Died: February 20, 1980 (aged 78)
- Party: Republican
- Children: 2; including Marshall W. Cobleigh

Neal W. Cobleigh (June 9, 1901 – February 20, 1980) was an American politician. He served as a Republican member for the Hillsborough 17th district of the New Hampshire House of Representatives.

== Life and career ==
Cobleigh was a title examiner.

Cobleigh served in the New Hampshire House of Representatives from 1972 to 1976.

Cobleigh died on February 20, 1980, at the age of 78.
