= George Twigg III =

American politician

Member of the New Hampshire House of Representatives from the 4th Belknap district
- In office December 6, 1972 – December 4, 1974 Serving with George B. Roberts Jr.
- Preceded by: Esther R. Nighswander
- Succeeded by: Warren W. Leary

Personal details
- Born: February 24, 1932 Newark, New Jersey, U.S.
- Died: December 1, 2017 (aged 85)
- Party: Republican
- Education: Boston University

George Twigg III (February 24, 1932 – December 1, 2017) was an American politician. He served as a Republican member for the Belknap 4th district of the New Hampshire House of Representatives.

== Life and career ==
Twigg was born in Newark, New Jersey. He attended Boston University and served in the United States Navy.

Twigg was a rental agent, had been the president of the Boston University Alumni Association and was a Republican state convention delegate.

Twigg served in the New Hampshire House of Representatives from 1972 to 1974.

Twigg died December 1, 2017, at the age of 85.
