= Jerry Roche =

American politician

Member-elect of the New Hampshire House of Representatives from the Hillsborough 45th district
- Assuming office December 2026
- Succeeding: Jack Flanagan

Personal details
- Party: Democratic

Jerry Roche is an American politician. A member of the Democratic Party, he is the member-elect for the Hillsborough 45th district of the New Hampshire House of Representatives.
