= Steve Shurtleff =

American politician

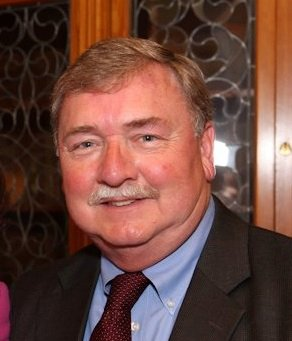
- Shurtleff in 2011

Speaker of the New Hampshire House of Representatives
- In office December 5, 2018 – December 2, 2020
- Deputy: Karen Ebel
- Preceded by: Gene Chandler
- Succeeded by: Dick Hinch

Minority Leader of the New Hampshire House of Representatives
- In office December 4, 2014 – December 5, 2018
- Deputy: Cindy Rosenwald
- Preceded by: Gene Chandler
- Succeeded by: Dick Hinch

Majority Leader of the New Hampshire House of Representatives
- In office December 5, 2012 – December 4, 2014
- Preceded by: Gene Chandler
- Succeeded by: Jack Flanagan

Member of the New Hampshire House of Representatives from the Merrimack 11th district
- Incumbent
- Assumed office December 1, 2004
- Preceded by: Eric Daniels

Personal details
- Born: Stephen James Shurtleff; September 4, 1947 (age 79) Concord, New Hampshire, U.S
- Party: Democratic
- Children: 3
- Education: City Colleges of Chicago

Military service
- Allegiance: United States
- Branch/service: United States Army
- Years of service: 1966–1969
- Rank: Sergeant
- Battles/wars: Vietnam War

Stephen James Shurtleff (born September 4, 1947) is an American politician from the state of New Hampshire. He formerly served as Speaker of the New Hampshire House of Representatives. A member of the Democratic Party, he serves as a member of the New Hampshire House of Representatives from the Merrimack 11th district. Shurtleff is a Vietnam veteran and a retired Supervisory Deputy US Marshal. While in the NH House he has held the positions of Committee Chair, Minority Leader, as well as Majority Leader. He previously served eleven years as an at-large member of the Concord City Council (2007 to 2018).

== Career ==
In 2004, Shurtleff ran for election to the New Hampshire House of Representatives as a Democrat. He was also elected as an at-large member of the Concord City Council in 2007.

Shurtleff served as the majority leader of the New Hampshire House in the 2012–14 session. When the Republican Party took control of the chamber in the 2014 elections in November 2014, the Democratic caucus elected Shurtleff as the new minority leader of the New Hampshire House, succeeding outgoing Speaker Terie Norelli as the Democratic leader. He served as speaker of the house from 2018 to 2020, while Democrats had the majority. In 2022, in the spirit of bipartisanship, former Speaker Shurtleff was named Speaker Emeritus of the N.H. House by the Republican House Speaker Sherm Packard. He is the first member of the N.H. House to hold all four of House's leadership positions, Minority Leader, Majority Leader, Speaker and Speaker Emeritus.

== Personal life ==
Shurtleff is from Ward One of Concord, New Hampshire, the village of Penacook. In 2020, he was one of New Hampshire's four Presidential Electors.

Shurtleff is a graduate of the Harold Washington School, of the City College of Chicago. In 2013, Shurtleff received the Henry Toll Fellowship from the Council of State Government. In 2015, he received the Caroline Gross Fellowship to attend the Senior Government Executive training program at Harvard's Kennedy School. He has three children, as well as two grandchildren Sarah and Alex.

New Hampshire House of Representatives
Preceded by Gene G. Chandler	Majority Leader of the New Hampshire House of Representatives; 2012–2014	Succeeded by Jack Flanagan
Preceded by Gene G. Chandler	Minority Leader of the New Hampshire House of Representatives; 2014–2018	Succeeded by Dick Hinch
Political offices
Preceded by Gene G. Chandler	Speaker of the New Hampshire House of Representatives; 2018–2020	Succeeded by Dick Hinch
