= Edward Chalmers Leavitt =

American painter

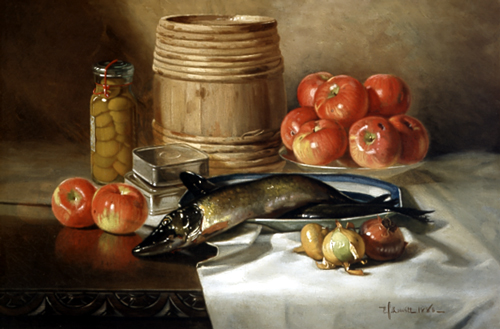
"Still Life with Fish," oil on canvas, Edward Chalmers Leavitt, 1886

Edward Chalmers Leavitt (1842–1904), a native of Providence, Rhode Island, was a New England painter said to be the most renowned still life painter of his day in Providence, although today he is largely forgotten.

Leavitt was born March 9, 1842, the son of Providence pastor Rev. Jonathan Leavitt and his wife Charlotte Esther (Stearns) Leavitt. Leavitt's father Rev. Jonathan Leavitt, was born at Cornish, New Hampshire, and later settled in the ministry at Bedford, Massachusetts, where he married the daughter of the primary minister Rev. Stearns, and subsequently was ordained minister of Richmond Street Congregational Church in Providence, where he remained for a quarter of a century. Rev. Leavitt's son Edward Chalmers Leavitt, born in Providence, attended private schools in Providence, and Kimball Union Academy in Meriden, New Hampshire. (His only sister Charlotte married Edward Slocum of Providence.)

At the outbreak of the American Civil War, Leavitt enlisted at Boston in the United States Navy with his friend William Warren Flint of Walpole, New Hampshire. During his Navy service, Leavitt frequently practiced his drawing technique.

Little is known of Leavitt's career. Most of his paintings featured tabletop arrangements of flowers, fruit, antiques and vintage bric-a-brac, and were sought after by the Victorian middle class. The oil on canvas paintings often were marked by their sense of texture. During the 1870s and 1880s Leavitt frequently exhibited at the National Academy of Design. But as the new century approached, Leavitt's output and quality declined, and his reputation faded.

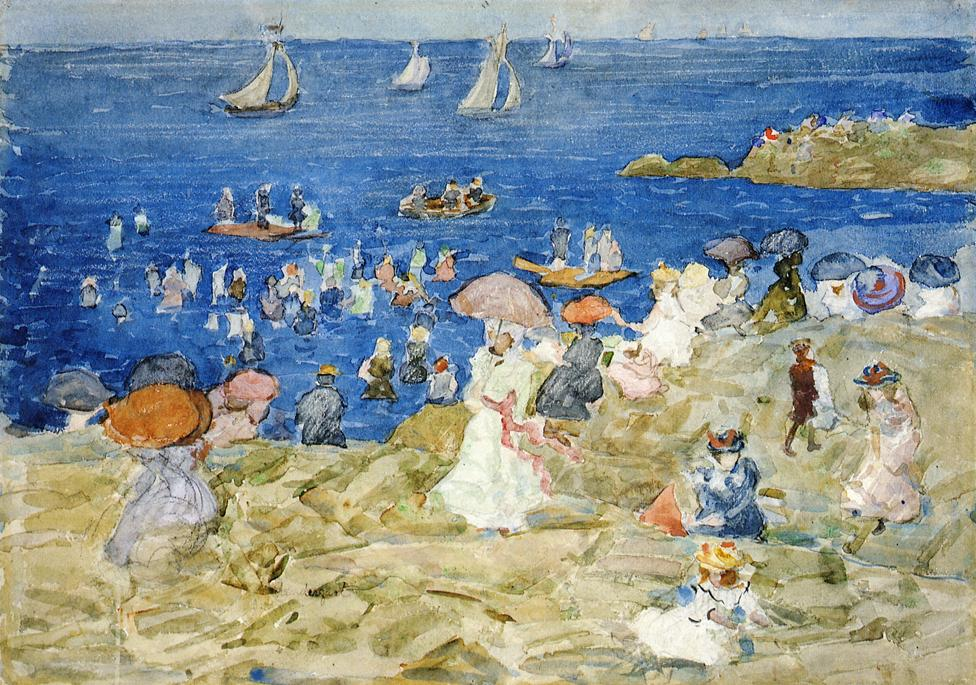
New England Beach Scene, watercolor, 1886–1887

There are indications that during his career, Leavitt worked with the gifted Martin Heade. Leavitt was known to have studied earlier with local artist James Morgan Lewin, a painter of romantic canvases. During his career, Leavitt painted thousands of canvases, turning out his trademark paintings of flowers, fruit and dead fish and game for a hungry middle class anxious for artworks to decorate their newly acquired homes. At one time, Leavitt's still lifes decorated Boston's esteemed Parker House hotel as well as the Narragansett Hotel in Providence. Leavitt worked at his studio at the Hoppin Homestead Building in Providence.

Among the artists of the day, Leavitt was seen as a solid—if uninspired—craftsman. Painter Charles Walter Stetson, for instance, didn't disguise his contempt for Leavitt's steady output for the upper middle classes, which Stetson saw as influenced by the Fall River school. "Artists! they are not artists," wrote Stetson in a fit of pique. "Leavitt himself said to me 'After all, Mr. Stetson, say what we may, we are only dry goods merchants in another line."

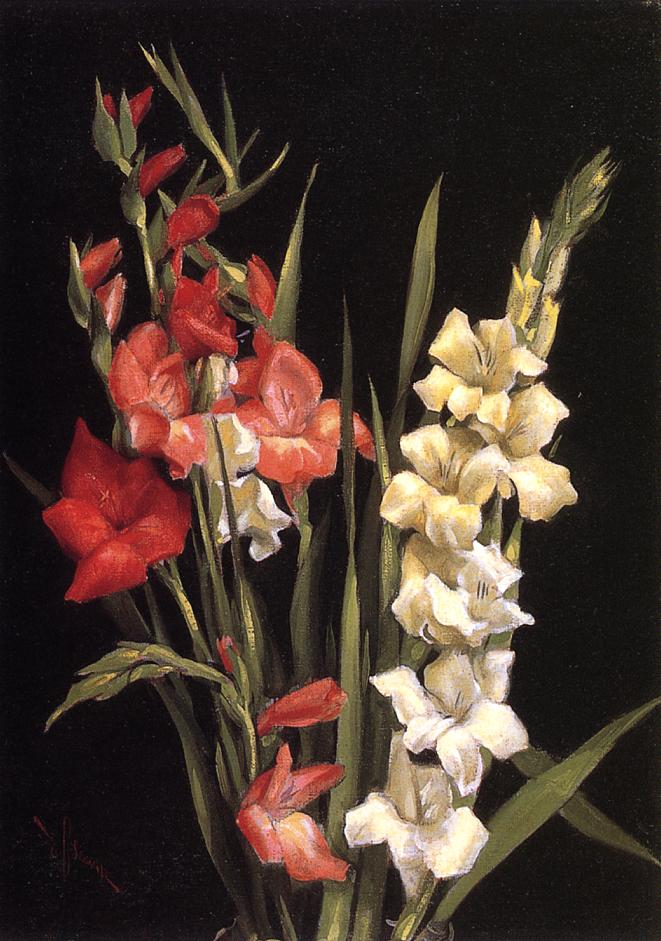
Still Life with Gladiolas, circa 1890

Leavitt's work is in the collection of the Brandywine River Museum, which has called him "Providence, Rhode Island's most successful still life painter of the nineteenth century." Leavitt's work is also in the collection of the Cahoon Museum of American Art in Cotuit, Massachusetts, and in the collection of the Cummer Museum of Art In Jacksonville, Florida.

Leavitt died at his home in Providence in 1904.
