= Anita Burroughs =

American politician

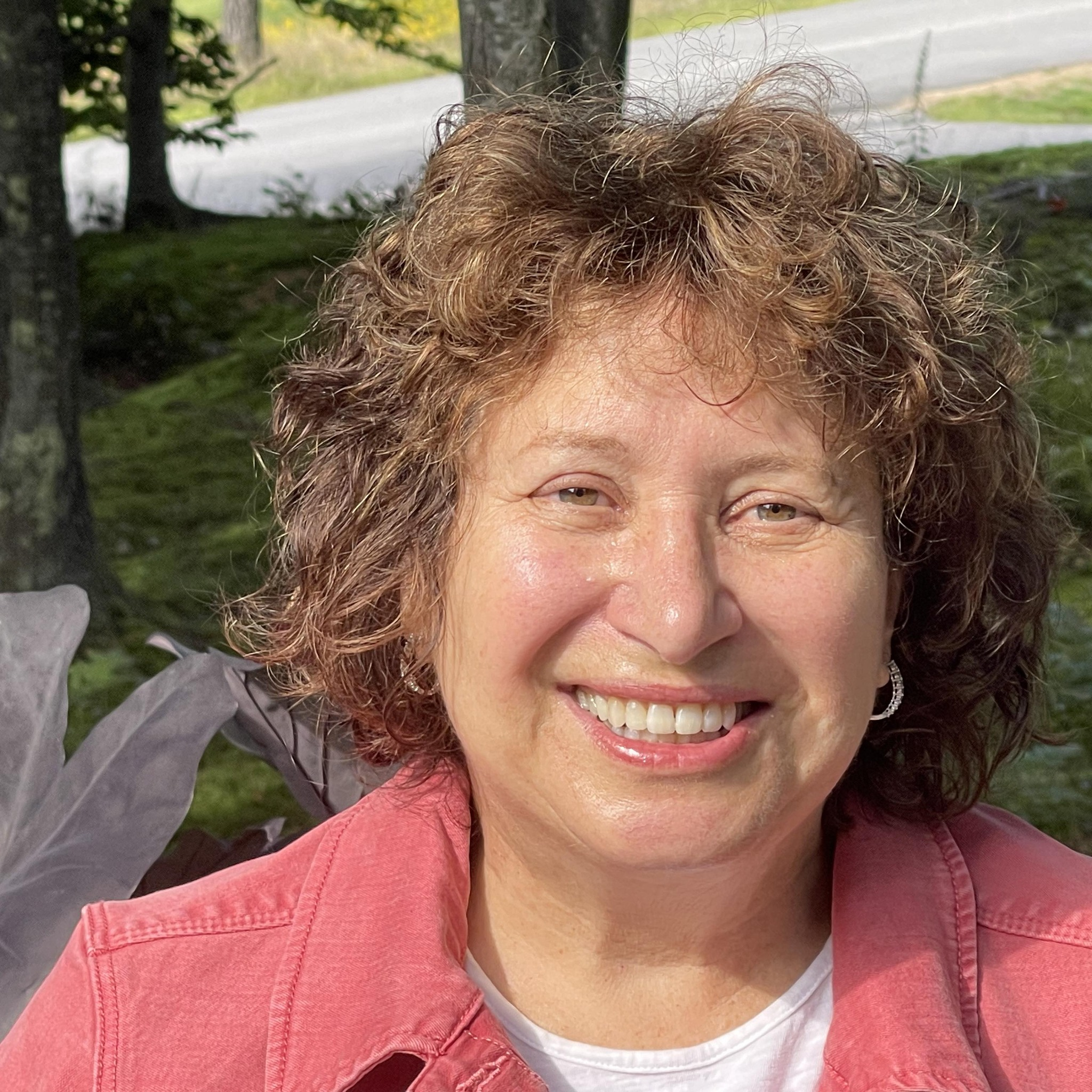

Member of the New Hampshire House of Representatives from the Carroll 1st district
- Incumbent
- Assumed office December 5, 2018
- Preceded by: Gene G. Chandler

Personal details
- Party: Democratic
- Spouse: Jonathan

Anita Burroughs is an American politician serving as a member of the New Hampshire House of Representatives from the Carroll 2nd district.

== Career ==
On November 6, 2018, Burroughs was elected to the New Hampshire House of Representatives where she represents the Carroll 2 district. She defeated the sitting Speaker of the House, Gene Chandler. Burroughs assumed office on December 5, 2018. She is now serving her fourth term as the Ranking Democrat on the Commerce and Consumer Affairs Committee. Burroughs is a Democrat. She will be running for re-election in 2026.

== Personal life ==
Burroughs resides in Glen, New Hampshire with her husband Jonathan Burroughs. Burroughs is married to Jonathan and has two step-children and two grandchildren. Jonathan Burroughs is a retired physician, and President and CEO of Burroughs Consulting Network, a health care consultancy. Jonathan recently passed the New Hampshire bar. She is Jewish.
