= Samuel Webster (New Hampshire politician) =

American politician

Member of the New Hampshire House of Representatives
- In office 1820s–1830s

Speaker of the New Hampshire House of Representatives
- In office 1829–1831
- Preceded by: James B. Thornton
- Succeeded by: Franklin Pierce

Personal details
- Born: Samuel C. Webster
- Party: Democratic

Samuel C. Webster was an American politician. A member of the Democratic Party, he served as speaker of the New Hampshire House of Representatives from 1829 to 1831.
