= John B. Tucker =

American politician (born 1937)

Member of the New Hampshire House of Representatives from New Hampshire

Speaker of the New Hampshire House of Representatives
- In office 1981–1987
- Preceded by: George B. Roberts Jr.
- Succeeded by: Doug Scamman Jr.

Personal details
- Born: November 14, 1937 (age 88)
- Party: Republican

John B. Tucker (born November 14, 1937) is an American politician. A Republican, he served as speaker of the New Hampshire House of Representatives from 1981 to 1987.

He endorsed the Mitt Romney 2012 presidential campaign in the 2012 United States presidential election.
