= Stephen S. Jewett =

American politician

Hon. Stephen Shannon Jewett
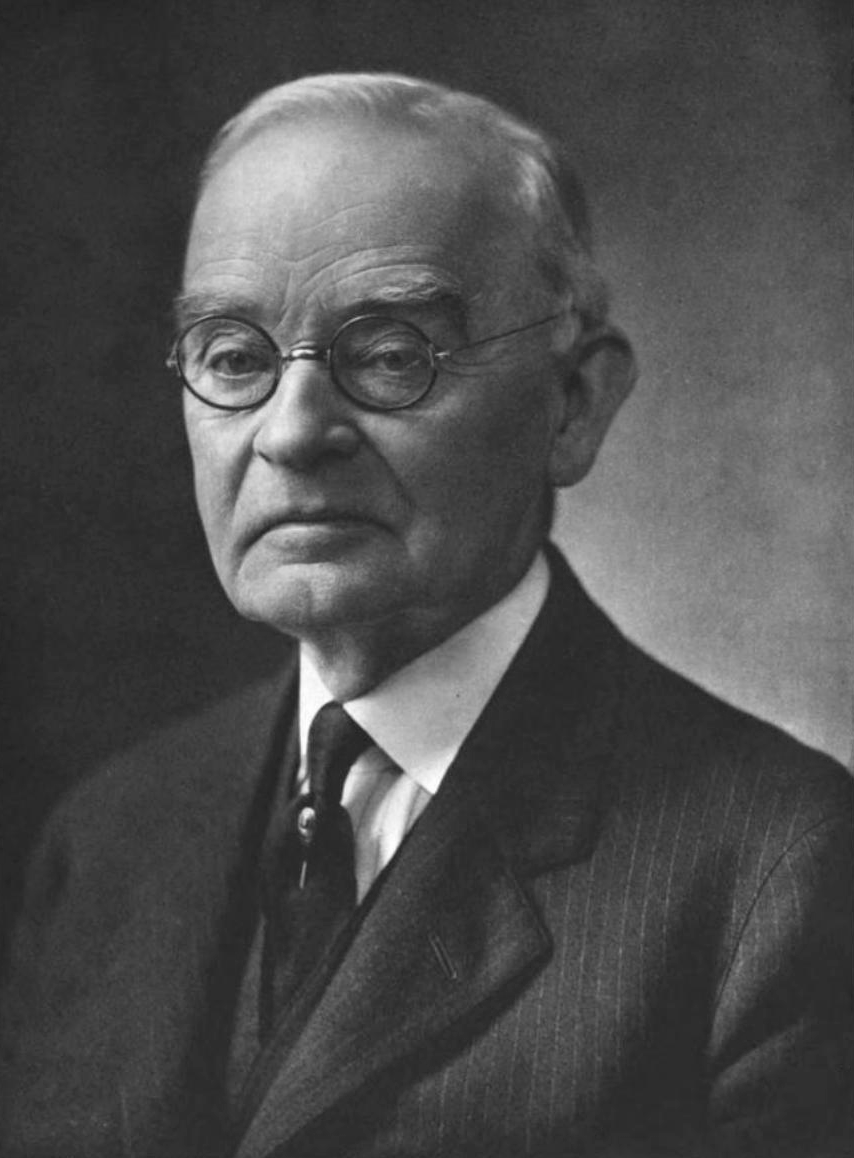

Speaker of the New Hampshire House of Representatives
- In office 1895–1897
- Preceded by: Robert N. Chamberlain
- Succeeded by: Frank Dunklee Currier

Member of the New Hampshire House of Representatives

Personal details
- Born: September 18, 1858 Laconia, New Hampshire
- Died: October 24, 1932 (aged 74) Laconia, New Hampshire
- Party: Republican
- Spouse: Annie L. Bray (m. 1880)
- Children: Theo S. Jewett
- Profession: Lawyer
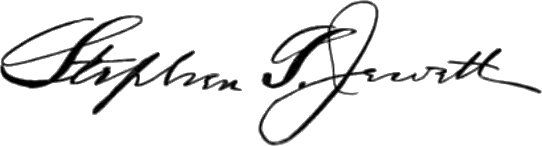
- Signature

Stephen Shannon Jewett (September 18, 1858 – October 24, 1932) was an American lawyer and Republican Party politician who served as the Speaker of the New Hampshire House of Representatives.

Jewett was born to John G. and Carrie E. (Shannon) Jewett in that part of Gilford, New Hampshire, that is now Laconia, New Hampshire on September 18, 1858.

Jewett was admitted to the New Hampshire bar in March 1880.

Jewett married Annie L. Bray of Bradford, England, on June 30, 1880. They had one child, a son, Theo S. Jewett.

Jewett was a 32nd degree Mason.

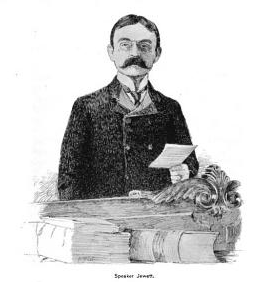
Jewett as Speaker of the New Hampshire House of Representatives

Jewett was elected to the New Hampshire House of Representatives in the 1894 election and chosen as the Speaker when the legislature was organized in 1895. In 1916, he was president of the New Hampshire Bar Association.

Jewett died at his home in Laconia October 24, 1932.

== Notes ==
Political offices
Preceded by Robert N. Chamberlain	Speaker of the New Hampshire House of Representatives; 1895 – 1897	Succeeded by James F. Briggs
