= Gene G. Chandler =

American politician

Gene Chandler

Speaker of the New Hampshire House of Representatives
- In office November 28, 2017 – December 5, 2018
- Deputy: Sherman Packard
- Preceded by: Shawn Jasper
- Succeeded by: Steve Shurtleff
- In office December 2000 – December 2004
- Preceded by: Donna Sytek
- Succeeded by: Doug Scamman

Deputy Speaker of the New Hampshire House of Representatives
- In office December 2014 – November 28, 2017
- Leader: Shawn Jasper
- Preceded by: ???
- Succeeded by: Sherman Packard

Minority Leader of the New Hampshire House of Representatives
- In office December 2012 – December 2014
- Preceded by: Terie Norelli
- Succeeded by: Steve Shurtleff

Speaker pro tempore of the New Hampshire House of Representatives
- In office December 2010 – December 2012

Majority Leader of the New Hampshire House of Representatives
- In office December 1998 – December 6, 2000
- Succeeded by: David Scanlan

Member of the New Hampshire House of Representatives from the Carroll 1st district
- In office 1983 – December 5, 2018
- Preceded by: Donalda K. Howard
- Succeeded by: Anita Burroughs

Personal details
- Born: June 28, 1947 (age 79) Damariscotta, Maine, U.S.
- Party: Republican
- Education: Southern New Hampshire University; Olivet College

Gene G. Chandler (born June 28, 1947) is a Republican politician in the U.S. state of New Hampshire. Residing in Bartlett, Chandler represented Carroll County District 1 (Bartlett, Hart's Location and Jackson) in the New Hampshire House of Representatives for decades until his defeat in 2018. He ran for the New Hampshire House of Representatives in 2022, however he lost the election.

== Legislative and leadership experience ==
Chandler was Deputy Majority Leader of the New Hampshire House of Representatives from 1997 to 1998, Majority Leader of the New Hampshire House of Representatives from 1998 to 2000, and Speaker of the House from 2000 to 2004 and 2017 to 2018. He served as House Speaker pro tempore from 2010 to 2012 and was elected House Republican Leader following the 2012 election.

In addition to his House duties, Chandler has served on the Bartlett Board of Selectmen since 1974 and has been chair of the board for the last 10 years.

== 2010 election ==
On October 6, 2010, the Conway Daily Sun reported that Chandler would run for Speaker again if the Republicans retook the House of Representatives in the 2010 elections. Chandler said, "“First, I have to win reelection in my district and as you know it’s a crowded field. Secondly we would need to see the Republicans get back the majority in the House. If that all happens then I will run for Speaker." Republicans currently need fourteen seats to retake the House. Chandler easily took the number one GOP slot in the primaries earlier in the year, and received more votes than any other candidate in his district. He won re-election and the Republican Party took control of the House on November 2, 2010.

Two weeks later, on November 18, 2010, Chandler was defeated 142–133 in his run for the Speakership. Chandler yielded to Representative William O'Brien, saying he would not ask House Democrats to support him.

O'Brien appointed Chandler Speaker Pro-Tempore, which he served as during the 2011–2012 term.

== 2012 election ==
In December 2012, Chandler was as elected as the Minority leader in the House, defeating former Deputy House Speaker Pam Tucker (R-Greenland) by a vote of 91–79.

== Personal life ==
Chandler attended New Hampshire College (now Southern New Hampshire University) and Olivet College and is in the real estate, land and timber business. He and his late wife, Nancy, were married for more than 30 years. He is the father of two grown sons and grandfather to four grandchildren. Chandler is an avid outdoorsman, hunter, skier.

== Campaign finance issues ==
Chandler was the Speaker of the House from 2001 until 2004, when he chose not to seek re-election as Speaker amid allegations that he failed to report approximately $64,000 he received in gifts over a six-year period. In 2004, it came to light that Chandler failed to report money he received from the group "Friends of Gene Chandler", which held an annual "Old-Fashioned Corn Roast" for the preceding ten years.

Chandler argued that he had been misinformed by the State Secretary of State's office, since the money was raised by a "Friends committee." Under New Hampshire State Law, money raised by such an organization cannot be used for election purposes, but is instead used to cover other expenses. However, the money must still be reported. Acknowledging he made a mistake, Chandler pleaded guilty to a single misdemeanor for violating RSA 640:5 Gifts to Public Servants, for failure to file financial information with the State. He was forced to pay the maximum fine of $2,000 and perform 100 hours of community service.

Chandler remained in office, but did not run for a third term as speaker. He received a censure from the House for violating House Ethics Rules, although the Ethics Committee had recommended expulsion. Chandler was reelected during the Attorney General's investigation and had the confidence of Speaker W. Douglas Scamman. Chandler served as Chairman of the House Public Works and Highways Committee.

On September 9, 2005, The Conway Daily Sun ran an article announcing that the corn roasts, now "Gene's Fall Family Fun Picnic", would continue as normal on September 11, 2005, with the cost still $10 to attend, and Rep. Chandler asserted it was "200 percent legal." The event has continued since then.

== Office ==
In the 2007-2008 biennium, House Republican Leader Michael Whalley appointed Chandler as Republican Policy Leader, the number 3 person in the Republican Caucus. House Republican Leader Sherman Packard appointed Chandler as Senior Assistant Republican Leader in the 2009-2010 legislative biennium.

Political offices
Preceded by Donna Sytek	Speaker of the New Hampshire House of Representatives; 2001–2004	Succeeded by William L. O'Brien
Preceded by Shawn Jasper	Speaker of the New Hampshire House of Representatives; 2017–2018	Succeeded by Steve Shurtleff
