= New Hampshire Department of Agriculture, Markets, and Food =

Government agency in the U.S. state of New Hampshire

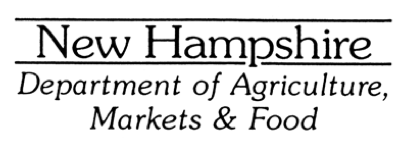

Agency overview
- Formed: 1913
- Preceding agency: Board of Agriculture
- Jurisdiction: New Hampshire
- Headquarters: 25 Capitol Street; Concord, New Hampshire
- Agency executive: Shawn N. Jasper, Commissioner
- Website: agriculture.nh.gov

The New Hampshire Department of Agriculture, Markets, and Food is a state agency of the U.S. state of New Hampshire, headquartered in Concord. The department's mission is "to support and promote agriculture and serve consumers and business for the benefit of the public health, environment and economy."

== Organization ==
The department is organized into six divisions:

- Division of Agricultural Development
- Division of Animal Industry
- Division of Pesticide Control
- Division of Plant Industry
- Division of Regulatory Services
- Division of Weights and Measures

Administratively attached to the department are the New Hampshire Agriculture in the Classroom program and the State Conservation Committee.

== Commissioners ==
The department has had seven commissioners since it was formed in 1913:

- Andrew L. Felker of Meredith (1913–1953)
- Perley I. Fitts of Durham (1953–1962)
- Frank T. Buckley of Derry (1962–1972)
- Howard C. Townsend of Lebanon (1972–1982)
- Stephen H. Taylor of Plainfield (1982–2007)
- Lorraine S. Merrill of Stratham (2007–2017)
- Shawn N. Jasper of Hudson (2017–present)
