= Gordon W. McKay =

American politician (1910–1990)

- State Senator Gordon McKay, ca. 1972

Member of the Oregon Senate from the 19th district
- In office 1965 – 1973
- Preceded by: Boyd R. Overhulse
- Succeeded by: Fred W. Heard
- Constituency: Crook, Deschutes, Jefferson, and Lake counties

Personal details
- Born: March 17, 1910 Aitkin, Minnesota, U.S.
- Died: October 26, 1990 (aged 80) Bend, Oregon, U.S.
- Party: Republican
- Profession: Businessman; politician

Gordon William McKay (March 17, 1910 – October 26, 1990) was an American politician and businessman from Oregon. He was a Republican who served two four-year terms in the Oregon State Senate. In the senate, McKay represented a large rural district in Central Oregon. While serving in the state senate, he was a champion of tax relief and helped modernize the state's criminal code. In the private sector, he was president of a title insurance company in Bend, Oregon.

== Early life ==
McKay was born on March 17, 1910, in Aitkin, Minnesota. His parents were Clyde Marshall and Olive Elizabeth (Spencer) McKay. In 1911, when he was less than a year old, McKay moved with his parents to Oregon. They traveled to central Oregon by passenger train, disembarking at Shaniko, where the railroad line ended at that time. From there the family, took a stagecoach to Bend, where they settled.

After arriving in Bend, his father became active in business, civic affairs, and local politics. McKay's father founded the Bend Company, a sawmill operation located along the Deschutes River. Later, his father became president of the Deschutes County Title and Abstract Company. He actively supported the effort to form a new county from the western part of Crook County. When the new Deschutes County was created in 1916, McKay's father was elected county treasurer, a position he held for 14 years. In addition, he served on the Bend city council and the local school board.

McKay attended school in Bend, graduating from high school there in 1929. He then attended the University of Oregon.

== Construction career ==
In 1930, McKay left Bend to take a job with the Oregon Highway Department. He worked for the highway department for four years before taking a career position as a construction engineer with the United States Bureau of Reclamation. His first assignment with the bureau began in 1934 at Parker Dam on the Colorado River located on the border between California and Arizona.

In 1936, McKay married Melba T. McKay. Prior to her marriage, she worked at Metro-Goldwyn-Mayer studios in Hollywood, California. After their marriage, Melba joined her husband at the Parker Dam site. Together they had two children.

McKay worked at Parker Dam for a total of four years before transferring to Marshall Ford Dam near Austin, Texas. He remained there until 1942, when he was reassigned to a power station in Phoenix, Arizona.

In early 1943, McKay left the Bureau of Reclamation to join the United States Navy. He served as a Chief Warrant Officer in the Seabees, specializing in amphibious landings. He saw combat action in the Asiatic-Pacific Theater during World War II including participation in the Battle of Tarawa. McKay was discharged from the navy in early 1946.

== Businessman and civic leader ==
After leaving the navy, McKay moved to Los Angeles, where he sold real estate for four years. He returned to Bend in 1950, becoming vice president of Deschutes County Title and Abstract Company. At that time, his father was still president of the company.

In 1952, McKay's wife Melba died of cancer at the age of 40. A year later, McKay married Evelyn Ruth Watson. Prior to her marriage, she owned and operated a cattle ranch along the Lewis River in Washington. After their marriage, she joined McKay in Bend.

In Bend, McKay was involved in a number of civic organizations. He was president of the local Kiwanis. He served on the Bend-La Pine School Board for eleven years, from 1953 through 1963. This included a term as board chairman. He was also a member of the Central Oregon Community College Foundation board of directors, a member of the Central Oregon Realty Board, and the Oregon Land Title Association. He was elected president of that organization in 1957. He was a member of the Bend chamber of commerce and served as chairman of the local United Way fund drive. In 1959, he was chosen as the Bend community's Boss of the Year. A year later, he was honored as Bend's Senior Citizen of the Year.

== State senator ==
In 1964, McKay decided to run for a seat in the Oregon State Senate as a Republican. He was unopposed in the 1964 Republican primary. In the general election that followed, McKay defeated the Democratic candidate, Charles L. Allen of Tumalo. In the state senate, he represented District 19 which at the time included Crook, Deschutes, Jefferson, and Lake counties. The 1965 legislative session lasted just over four months, from January 11 through May 14. During the session, he was appointed to the powerful ways and means committee. He also participated in a week-long special legislative session, shortly after the close of the 1965 regular session.

Because terms in the Oregon state senate last four years, McKay was seated in the 1967 legislative sessions without running for re-election in 1966. The 1967 session began on January 11 and lasted through June 14. During the session, McKay served as chairman of the elections committee and vice chairman of the commerce and utilities committee. He was also a member of the ways and means, air and water quality control, health and welfare, and judiciary committees.

In 1968, McKay ran for a second term representing District 19. He was unopposed in the Republican primary and got enough write-in votes in the Democratic primary to win that party's nomination as well. As a result, he was unopposed in the general election. The 1969 legislative session lasted just over three months, starting on January 13 and ending on April 23. During the session, McKay chaired the rules and resolutions committee and was a member of the ways and means, constitutional revisions and government reorganization, and judiciary committees. His main focus during the session was tax relief.

During the second half of his second senate term, McKay attended the regular 1971 legislative session. That session began on January 11 and lasted through June 10. McKay served as chairman of the financial affairs committee and vice chairman of the rules and resolutions committee. He was also a member of the judiciary committee. During the session, he helped enact legislation that revised the state's criminal code.

Prior to the 1972 election, state senate districts were reorganized. In the redistricting, Deschutes County (McKay's home county) was joined with Klamath County to form District 27. In 1972, McKay ran for a third senate term. This time, seeking to represent District 27. He won the Republican nomination, but lost the general election to his Democratic opponent, Fred W. Heard of Klamath Falls. In the general election, McKay easily won Deschutes County with 8,509 votes against 6,131 votes for Heard. However, it was the opposite story in Klamath County, where Heard won by an even greater margin. The final vote was 12,578 for McKay and 15,205 for Heard. McKay left the state senate in January 1973 when his second term expired.

== Later life and legacy ==
After leaving the state Senate, McKay returned to his title insurance business in Bend. When he eventually retired from business, McKay and his third wife, Della Marjorie (Phillips) McKay, traveled around the country in a motor home. This included regular trips up and down the west coast to watch University of Oregon Ducks football games. Over the years, they traveled enough to wear out two motor home engines.

McKay died of a heart attack at his home in Bend on October 26, 1990. He was 80 years old at the time of his death. McKay is buried in Pilot Butte Cemetery in Bend.

McKay's boyhood home was built in 1916. It is a craftsman style bungalow. Its original site overlooked the Deschutes River. In 1973, the house was moved to a new location, upstream along the river. It was then restored with the help of the Deschutes County Historical Society. Today, it is a popular restaurant called McKay's Cottage.
