= Marshall W. Cobleigh =

American politician

Member of the New Hampshire House of Representatives
- In office 1963–1973

Speaker of the New Hampshire House of Representatives
- In office 1969–1972
- Preceded by: Walter R. Peterson Jr.
- Succeeded by: James E. O'Neil Sr.

Personal details
- Born: June 4, 1930
- Died: January 31, 2009 (aged 78)
- Party: Republican
- Parent: Neal W. Cobleigh (father)
- Education: Boston University

Marshall W. Cobleigh (June 4, 1930 – January 31, 2009) was an American politician. He served as a Republican member of the New Hampshire House of Representatives.

== Life and career ==
Cobleigh attended Boston University and served in the United States Navy.

Cobleigh served in the New Hampshire House of Representatives from 1963 to 1973, serving as speaker of the House from 1969 to 1972. Cobleigh ran for Congress in 1980 but lost to Democrat Norman D'Amours.

Cobleigh died January 31, 2009, at the age of 78.
