= William N. Cohen =

American lawyer and judge

William Nathan Cohen
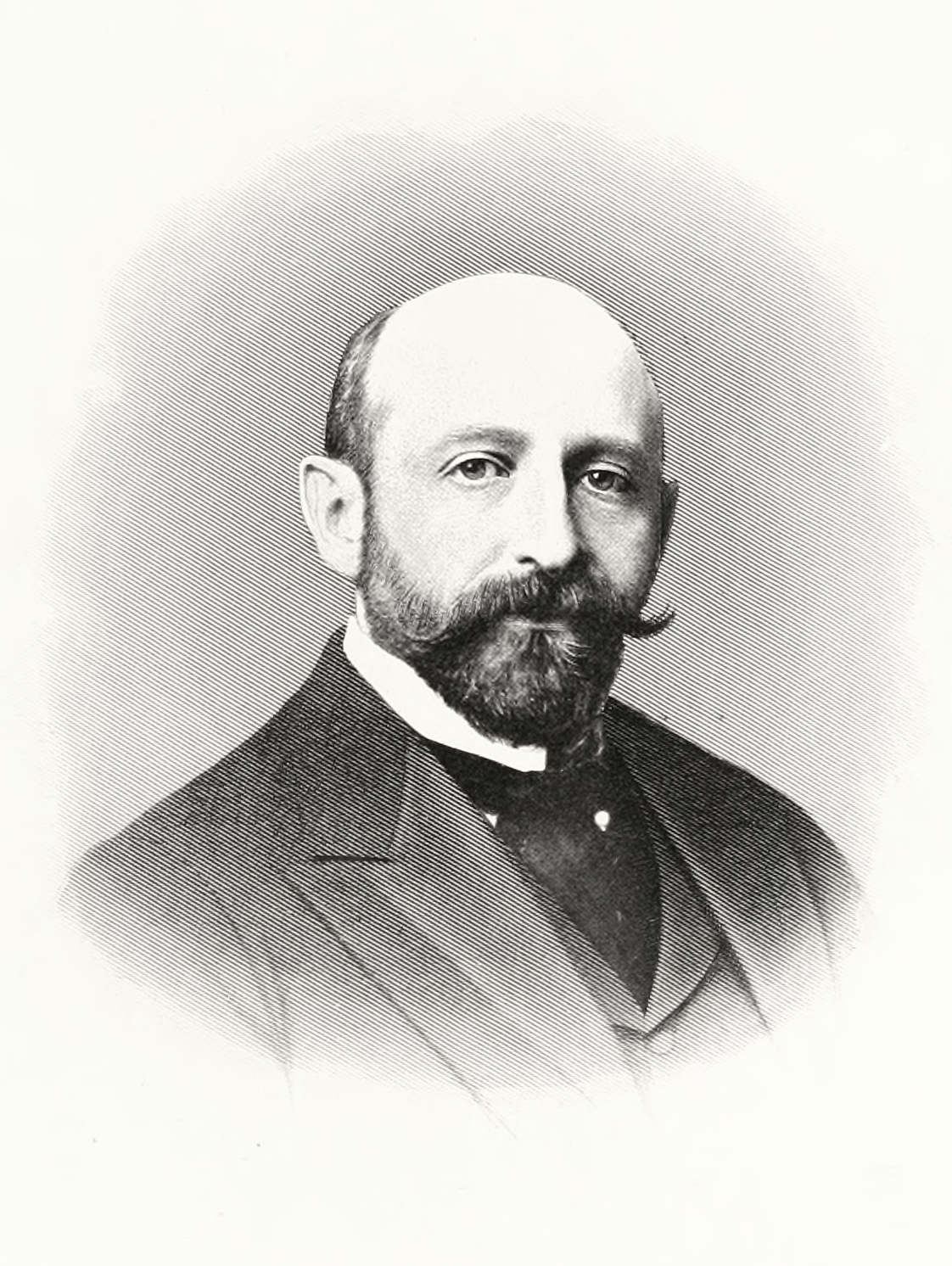
- Born: May 7, 1857; New York City, New York, U.S.
- Died: February 27, 1938 (aged 80); Atlantic City, New Jersey, U.S.
- Education: Dartmouth College (BA); Columbia Law School (LLB)
- Occupations: Lawyer, judge
- Known for: Justice of the New York Supreme Court

William Nathan Cohen (May 7, 1857 – February 27, 1938) was a Jewish-American lawyer and judge from New York City.

== Life ==
Cohen was born on May 7, 1857, in New York City, New York, the son of Nathan Cohen and Ernestine Erdmann. His father was a German immigrant from Bavaria who worked as a dry goods merchant.

Cohen's father died when he was two, leaving his mother to support the family. She died when he was seventeen. He spent the winter of 1873 to 1874 being tutored by S. W. Adriance, a student at the Union Theological Seminary, and from 1874 to 1875 he took a preparatory courses at Kimball Union Academy in Meriden, New Hampshire. He went to Dartmouth College in 1875, where he became a member of Phi Beta Kappa, and graduated with a B.A. in 1879. He then studied law at Columbia Law School, graduating from there with an LL.B. in 1881. He was also admitted to the New York bar that year.

Cohen began working as a clerk in the law office of Morrison, Lauterbach & Spingarn when he was thirteen. While attending Dartmouth, he worked as a schoolteacher in the winter and as a law office clerk in the summer. One of his employers, Siegmund Spingarn, assisted him during that time. He continued working as a clerk in the law firm while attending Columbia, and when Spingarn died in 1883 he was made a member of the law firm, renamed Hoadly, Lauterbach & Johnson. He was counsel for, among other corporations and institutions, the Brooklyn Elevated Railroad, the Third Avenue Railway, the Edison Electric Illuminating Company, the Consolidated Telegraph and Electrical Subway Company, the Hebrew Benevolent Orphan Society, and the Mount Sinai Training School for Nurses.

In September 1897, Governor Frank S. Black appointed Cohen Justice of the New York Supreme Court to fill a vacancy caused by the death of Justice John Sedgwick. He ran for Justice as a Republican in the 1898 election. He lost the election, retired as Justice at the end of the year, and resumed practicing law without a partner. He served as Counsel for Governor Theodore Roosevelt from 1899 to 1900 and was closely associated with in preparing special franchise tax laws during that time. Later, when Roosevelt became president, he went to Washington, D.C., and aided in drafting the treaty that made the United States the receiver of customs for San Domingo. He was a delegate to the 1904 Republican National Convention. During World War I he was chairman of Local Exemption Board 163 and a member of the Ocean Advisory Committee on just compensation of the United States Shipping Board.

Cohen never married. He was president of the Dartmouth Alumni Association of New York, a charter member of the Lawyers Club, a founder of the Dartmouth chapter of Alpha Delta Phi, and a member of the New York City Bar Association, the New York State Bar Association, the American Bar Association, the New York County Lawyers' Association, the Lotos Club, the Harmonie Club, the University Club of Washington, DC, the Bohemian Club, the American Society of International Law, the American Academy of Political and Social Science, and the American Association for the Advancement of Science.

Cohen from a stroke at the Hotel President in Atlantic City, New Jersey, where he was on vacation, on February 27, 1938. His funeral was held at the Fresh Pond Crematory in Long Island, with Dr. John Elliott delivering an address.
