= Kimball Union Academy =

Private school in Meriden, New Hampshire, US

Coordinates: 43°32′46″N 72°15′31″W

- Meriden, NH; USA

Information
- Type: Private Boarding
- Established: 1813; 213 years ago
- Head of School: Tyler Lewis
- Faculty: approx. 52
- Enrollment: approx. 340
- Average class size: 11
- Student to teacher ratio: 6:1
- Campus: Rural
- Colors: Orange & Black
- Athletics: 20 interscholastic
- Athletics conference: Lakes Region League
- Mascot: Wildcat
- Website: www.kua.org

Kimball Union Academy is a private boarding school located in New Hampshire.

Founded in 1813, it is the 22nd-oldest boarding school in the United States. It is located in the upper Connecticut River Valley village of Meriden, New Hampshire.

The academy's 1,300-acre (5.3 km^{2}) village campus is 2 1/2 hours via major highways from Boston, Massachusetts, and Hartford, Connecticut. Nearby bus, train, and plane terminals link the area directly with Boston, New York City, and Manchester, New Hampshire. The academy is governed by a 17-member board of trustees.

== Notable alumni ==
- Abdul-Malik Abu (born 1995), basketball player in the Israeli Premier Basketball League
- F. Lee Bailey, defense attorney
- Frederick H. Billings, lawyer, financier and President of the Northern Pacific Railway
- Francis B. Brewer, congressman
- Augusta Cooper Bristol (1835–1910), poet, lecturer
- John Graham Brooks (1846-1938), sociologist and author
- Henry E. Burnham, U.S. senator
- Frank Gay Clarke, congressman
- William Cogswell, congressman, general
- William N. Cohen, Justice of the New York Supreme Court
- Frank Dunklee Currier, congressman
- Daniel Bateman Cutter, physician and New Hampshire politician
- Irving W. Drew, U.S. senator
- Kasim Edebali, NFL player
- Jonathan Clarkson Gibbs, Presbyterian minister, Reconstruction politician
- Louis B. Goodall, congressman
- A.J. Greer, NHL player for the Florida Panthers
- Broughton Harris, Vermont newspaper editor and businessman who was one of the Runaway Officials of 1851 as Secretary of the Utah Territory
- Jordan Harris, NHL player for the Boston Bruins
- Doc Hazelton, major league baseball player and college coach
- Chester Bradley Jordan, Governor of New Hampshire
- Ernest Everett Just, African American biologist
- Nathan Knight (born 1997), NBA and Israeli Basketball Premier League basketball player
- Edward Chalmers Leavitt, artist
- John C. Lord, Presbyterian minister and nativist
- James D. Lynch, African American politician, minister
- Charles W. Porter, Secretary of State of Vermont
- Samuel L. Powers, congressman
- Will Sheff, rock musician
- Steven Sotloff, Israeli-American journalist
- Taylor Soule, WNBA player
- Dana Stone, Vietnam War photographer
- Bainbridge Wadleigh, U.S. senator
- Aldace F. Walker, railroad president
- James M. Warner, Civil War general, industrialist
- Augustus Washington, African American photographer
- William Wells, Civil War general, Medal of Honor winner
- Andrew Wheating, Olympian
- Benjamin F. Whidden, first ambassador to Haiti

== See also ==
- New Hampshire Historical Marker No. 77: Kimball Union Academy
