= James B. Thornton =

US diplomat

U.S. chargé d'affaires to Peru
- In office March 16, 1837 – December 10, 1837
- President: Andrew Jackson
- Preceded by: Samuel Larned
- Succeeded by: James Chamberlayne Pickett

Member of the New Hampshire House of Representatives from Merrimack
- In office 1820s

Speaker of the New Hampshire House of Representatives
- In office 1827–1829
- Succeeded by: Samuel Webster

Personal details
- Party: Democratic

James B. Thornton (May 11, 1800 – January 25, 1838) was the U.S. chargé d'affaires to Peru under President Andrew Jackson from March 16 to December 10, 1837. He died of dysentery on January 25, 1838. He served in the New Hampshire House of Representatives, representing the Merrimack County, and was speaker from 1827 to 1829.
