= George B. Roberts Jr. =

American politician (born 1939)

Member of the New Hampshire House of Representatives
- In office 1966–1970

Member of the New Hampshire House of Representatives from the Belknap 6th district
- In office 1970–1972

Member of the New Hampshire House of Representatives from the Belknap 4th district
- In office 1972–1980

Speaker of the New Hampshire House of Representatives
- In office 1975–1980
- Preceded by: James E. O'Neil Sr.
- Succeeded by: John B. Tucker

President of the National Conference of State Legislatures
- In office 1979–1980
- Preceded by: Jason Boe
- Succeeded by: Richard Hodes

Personal details
- Born: June 6, 1939 (age 87) Andover, Massachusetts, U.S.
- Party: Republican
- Education: University of New Hampshire

George B. Roberts Jr. (born June 6, 1939) is an American politician. He served as a member for the Belknap 4th and 6th district of the New Hampshire House of Representatives.

== Life and career ==
Roberts was born in Andover, Massachusetts. He attended the University of New Hampshire.

Roberts was an insurance agent.

Roberts served in the New Hampshire House of Representatives from 1966 to 1980.

From 1979 to 1980, Roberts was president of the National Conference of State Legislatures.

New Hampshire House of Representatives
Preceded by Constituency established	Member of the New Hampshire House of Representatives from the Belknap 6th district 1966–1972	Succeeded by David Huot
Preceded by Esther R. Nighswander	Member of the New Hampshire House of Representatives from the Belknap 4th district 1972–1980; Served alongside: George Twigg III, Warren W. Leary, Jane F. Sanders	Succeeded by Steven W. Rollins
Political offices
Preceded by James E. O'Neil Sr.	Speaker of the New Hampshire House of Representatives; 1975–1980	Succeeded by John B. Tucker
