= Shawn Jasper =

American politician (born 1959)

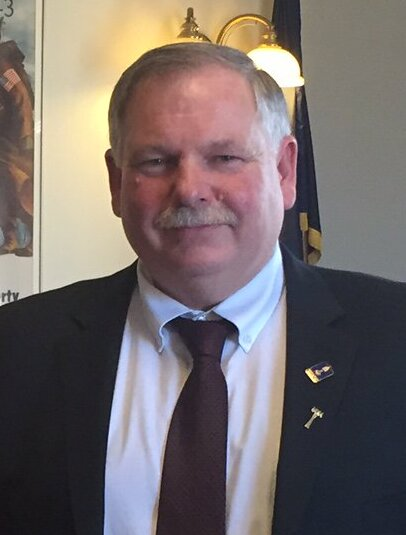
- Jasper in 2016

Commissioner of the New Hampshire Department of Agriculture, Markets, and Food
- Incumbent
- Assumed office December 11, 2017
- Governor: Chris Sununu; Kelly Ayotte
- Preceded by: Lorraine Merrill

Speaker of the New Hampshire House of Representatives
- In office December 3, 2014 – November 28, 2017
- Deputy: Gene Chandler
- Preceded by: Terie Norelli
- Succeeded by: Gene Chandler

Member of the New Hampshire House of Representatives from the 37th Hillsborough district
- In office December 5, 2012 – December 1, 2017
- Preceded by: Constituency established
- Succeeded by: Multi-member district

Member of the New Hampshire House of Representatives from the 27th Hillsborough district
- In office December 1, 2004 – December 5, 2012
- Preceded by: Constituency established
- Succeeded by: Jim Belanger; Carolyn M. Gargasz

Member of the New Hampshire House of Representatives from the 66th Hillsborough district
- In office December 4, 2002 – December 1, 2004
- Preceded by: Constituency established
- Succeeded by: Constituency abolished

Member of the New Hampshire House of Representatives from the 23rd Hillsborough district
- In office December 2, 1992 – December 7, 1994
- Preceded by: Alice B. Record; Robert S. Mercer; Stanley R. Vanderlosk
- Succeeded by: Multi-member district

Member of the New Hampshire House of Representatives from the 19th Hillsborough district
- In office December 7, 1988 – December 2, 1992
- Preceded by: Multi-member district
- Succeeded by: Bonnie B. Packard
- In office December 5, 1984 – December 3, 1986
- Preceded by: Multi-member district
- Succeeded by: Multi-member district

Personal details
- Born: January 23, 1959 (age 67) Nashua, New Hampshire, U.S.
- Party: Republican
- Spouse: Laurie
- Children: Sarah
- Education: University of New Hampshire

Shawn N. Jasper (born January 23, 1959) is an American politician from the state of New Hampshire. A member of the Republican Party, he serves as the Commissioner of the New Hampshire Department of Agriculture, Markets, and Food, and is a former Speaker of the New Hampshire House of Representatives.

== Biography ==
Jasper graduated from Alvirne High School in Hudson, New Hampshire, in 1977. He received an associate degree in business administration from the University of New Hampshire. He has served as advisor to the Alpha Gamma Rho Omega Chapter, of the University of New Hampshire since 1986. He was elected to the New Hampshire House in 1984, and served one two-year term. He was elected again in 1988, and served through 1994. He was elected to the state House again in 2002. He also served for 16 years on the Hudson Board of Selectmen, but lost his bid for reelection in 2012.

In the 2014 elections, Jasper was reelected to his 11th term in the New Hampshire House. Republicans retook the majority in the New Hampshire House from the Democratic Party in the 2014 election. After the election, William L. O'Brien, the former Republican Speaker of the House, ran for Speaker against Democrat Steve Shurtleff. Enough Republicans voted for Shurtleff on the first ballot that O'Brien did not receive the majority. Shurtleff then dropped out of the race, and Jasper entered. On the third ballot, Jasper received the majority of all ballots cast, defeating O'Brien with the majority of Democratic members and some Republicans voting for him.

In October 2017, Governor Chris Sununu nominated Jasper to lead the state's agriculture department. Jasper has led the New Hampshire Department of Agriculture, Markets, and Food since December 11, 2017.
