= Donna Sytek =

American politician from New Hampshire (1944)

Donna P. Sytek

Speaker of the New Hampshire House of Representatives
- In office December 4, 1996 – December 6, 2000
- Preceded by: Harold Burns
- Succeeded by: Gene G. Chandler

Member of the New Hampshire House of Representatives
- In office 1977 – December 6, 2000
- Constituency: 5th district (1977–1981); 20th district (1981–1991); 26th district (1991–2000)

Personal details
- Born: December 14, 1944 (age 81) Haverhill, Massachusetts, US
- Party: Republican
- Education: Regis College

Donna P. Sytek (born December 14, 1944) is an American Republican Party politician who served in the New Hampshire House of Representatives and was its first female Speaker.

== Early life ==
Sytek was born in Haverhill, Massachusetts on December 14, 1944. She graduated from Regis College in 1966. She is married to John Sytek.

== Political career ==
Initially a democrat, Sytek changed her political affiliation to republican right after the Watergate scandal, and was first elected to the New Hampshire House of Representatives following a special election in 1977. During her time in the New Hampshire House of Representatives, Sytek chaired several committees, including: Judiciary, Ways and Means and Criminal Justice. Sytek served as a delegate to the 1980, 1984 and 1988 Republican National Conventions. She was also chairwoman of the New Hampshire Republican Party from 1982 to 1984. On December 4, 1996, Sytek was elected the first female Speaker of the New Hampshire House of Representatives, serving two terms until December 6, 2000.

== Later life ==
Sytek announced on February 28, 2000, that she wouldn't run for another term as Speaker nor would she run for another term as a State representative, citing health issues as her motive for doing so, as well as stating that it was time to pass the torch. Following her departure and retirement from politics, Sytek received a portrait of her as Speaker, which hangs in the New Hampshire State House near the Speaker's office. She went on to endorse Chris Christie for President of the United States in the 2016 presidential election and Nikki Haley in the 2024 presidential election. She resides in Salem, New Hampshire.

== See also ==
- New Hampshire House of Representatives

New Hampshire House of Representatives
Preceded by Multi-member district	Member of the New Hampshire House of Representatives from the Rockingham 5th district 1977–1982	Succeeded by Multi-member district
Preceded by Multi-member district	Member of the New Hampshire House of Representatives from the Rockingham 20th district 1982–1992	Succeeded by Multi-member district
Preceded by Multi-member district	Member of the New Hampshire House of Representatives from the Rockingham 26th district 1992–2000	Succeeded by Multi-member district
Political offices
Preceded by Harold Burns	Speaker of the New Hampshire House of Representatives; 1996–2000	Succeeded by Gene G. Chandler
