= Stella Scamman =

American politician

New Hampshire House of Representatives
- In office 2002 – December 31, 2010

Personal details
- Born: Stella Emanuel; 1941 or 1942 (age 84–85)
- Party: Republican
- Spouse: Doug Scamman Jr. (m. 1963)
- Children: 4
- Relatives: Doug Scamman Sr. (father-in-law)

Stella Scamman (née Emanuel; born 1941 or 1942) is a former member of the New Hampshire House of Representatives, represented Rockingham District 13 for three terms before leaving office on December 31, 2010. Before entering politics, Scamman taught history and started a business selling craft supplies. She was also a member of the University of New Hampshire Board of Trustees.

She married Doug Scamman Jr. in 1963 and has four children.
