= Fred Jones (footballer, born 1898) =

English footballer

Personal information
- Full name: Frederick John Jones
- Date of birth: 11 February 1898
- Place of birth: Greenwich, London, England
- Date of death: 1990 (aged 91–92)
- Height: 5 ft 7 in (1.70 m)
- Position: Inside forward

Senior career*
Years	Team	Apps	(Gls)
1923–1924	Arsenal	2	(0)
1924	Aberdare Athletic	12	(2)
1925	Charlton Athletic	10	(2)
1926	Blackpool	0	(0)
- * Club domestic league appearances and goals

Frederick John Jones (11 February 1898 – 1990) was an English footballer who made 24 appearances in the Football League in the 1920s playing as an inside forward for Arsenal, Aberdare Athletic and Charlton Athletic. He was also on the books of Blackpool without playing for them in the League.

An inside forward born in Greenwich, London, Jones was in the Royal Navy and played for the Navy team before being signed by Arsenal in 1923. He spent just one season with the club, mainly as a reserve playing in the London Combination, but managed to make two First Division matches in the 1923–24 season, making his debut in a 4–1 defeat by Burnley at Turf Moor on 28 April 1924.

After leaving Arsenal, he had spells with Aberdare Athletic, Charlton Athletic and Blackpool.
