= Doug Scamman Sr. =

American politician

Member of the New Hampshire House of Representatives
- In office 1942–1947
- In office 1949–1958

Speaker of the New Hampshire House of Representatives
- In office 1957–1958
- Preceded by: Charles Griffin
- Succeeded by: Stewart Lamprey

Personal details
- Born: September 23, 1915 Biddeford, Maine, U.S.
- Died: August 12, 1995 (aged 79)
- Party: Republican
- Children: Doug Jr.
- Relatives: Stella Emanuel (daughter-in-law)

Doug Scamman Sr. (September 23, 1915 – August 12, 1995), also known as W. Douglas Scamman, was an American politician. He served as a Republican member of the New Hampshire House of Representatives.

== Life and career ==
Scamman was born in Biddeford, Maine. He was a town auditor in Stratham, New Hampshire.

Scamman served in the New Hampshire House of Representatives from 1942 to 1947 and again from 1949 to 1958.

Scamman died on August 12, 1995, at the age of 79.
