= Frederick Jones (footballer) =

Welsh footballer

Fred Jones
Personal information
- Full name: Frederick Jones
- Date of birth: 1863
- Place of birth: Wales

International career
Years	Team	Apps	(Gls)
1885–1886	Wales	3	(0)

Frederick Jones (born 1863) was a Welsh international footballer. He was part of the Wales national football team between 1885 and 1886, playing 3 matches. He played his first match on 14 March 1885 against England and his last match on 10 April 1886 against Scotland.

== See also ==
- List of Wales international footballers (alphabetical)
