= Doug Scamman Jr. =

American politician

Doug Scamman

Speaker of the New Hampshire House of Representatives
- In office 2004 – December 2006
- Preceded by: Gene Chandler
- Succeeded by: Terie Norelli
- In office 1987–1990
- Preceded by: John B. Tucker
- Succeeded by: Harold Burns

Personal details
- Born: Walter Douglas Scamman Jr. November 26, 1941 (age 84) Concord, New Hampshire, U.S.
- Party: Republican
- Spouse: Stella Emanuel (m. 1963)
- Children: 4
- Parent: Doug Scamman Sr. (father)
- Education: University of New Hampshire

Walter Douglas Scamman Jr. (born November 26, 1941) is a Republican former Speaker of the New Hampshire House of Representatives from Stratham, New Hampshire.

Scamman was born in Concord, New Hampshire in 1941, the son of Doug Scamman Sr., who served in the New Hampshire House from 1942 to 1947 and 1949 to 1958, and as speaker in 1957. He attended the University of New Hampshire with the help of scholarships and graduated with a degree in political science in 1964. He eventually ran for office and became a state representative and then Speaker of the House in the New Hampshire Legislature. He married Stella Emanuel in 1963 and has four children. Scamman and his wife, Stella, served as New Hampshire state campaign co-chairs for John Kasich's 2016 presidential campaign. He encouraged Kasich to run again in 2020.

== See also ==
- Scamman Farm

New Hampshire House of Representatives
Preceded by Nelson E. Barker	Member of the New Hampshire House of Representatives from the Rockingham 15th district 1968–1982	Succeeded by James R. Rosencrantz
Preceded by John E. Splaine; John W. Camuso	Member of the New Hampshire House of Representatives from the Rockingham 19th district 1982–1990	Succeeded by George R. Rubin; Deborah L. Woods
Preceded by Multi-member district	Member of the New Hampshire House of Representatives from the Rockingham 13th district 2004–2006	Succeeded by Multi-member district
Preceded by Multi-member district	Member of the New Hampshire House of Representatives from the Rockingham 13th district 2008–2010	Succeeded by Multi-member district
Political offices
Preceded by John B. Tucker	Speaker of the New Hampshire House of Representatives; 1987–1990	Succeeded by Harold Burns
Preceded by Gene Chandler	Speaker of the New Hampshire House of Representatives; 2004–2006	Succeeded by Terie Norelli
