= Jason Boe =

American politician

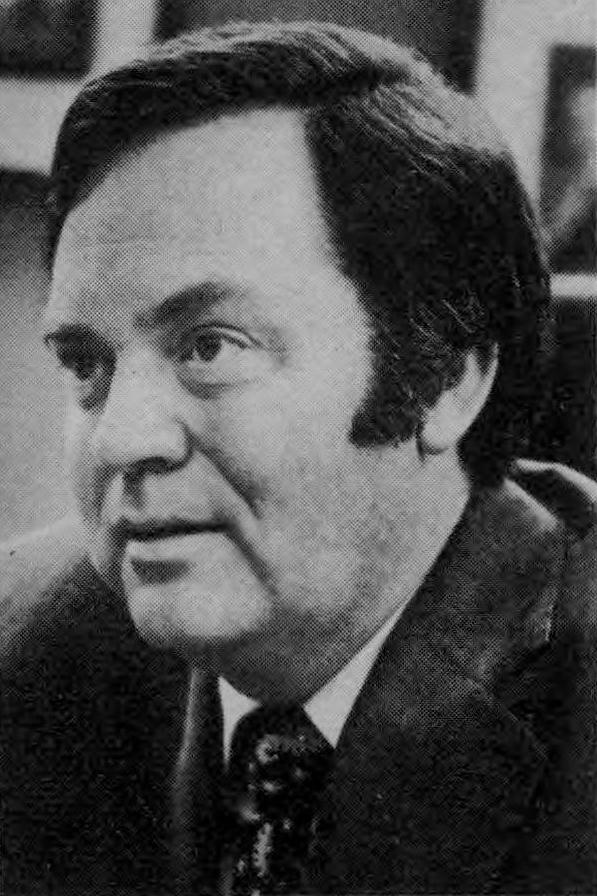

Member of the Oregon Senate from the 23rd district
- In office 1970–1980
- Constituency: Douglas County

President of the Oregon State Senate
- In office 1973–1980
- Preceded by: John D. Burns
- Succeeded by: Fred W. Heard

Member of the Oregon House of Representatives from the 15th District
- In office 1964–1970
- Constituency: Douglas County

President of the National Conference of State Legislatures
- In office 1978–1979
- Preceded by: Fred Anderson
- Succeeded by: George B. Roberts Jr.

Personal details
- Born: March 10, 1929 Los Angeles, California
- Died: March 20, 1990 (aged 61) Portland, Oregon
- Party: Democratic
- Spouse: Kathryn Boe
- Education: Pacific University
- Profession: Optometrist

Jason Douglas Boe (March 10, 1929 – March 20, 1990) was an American optometrist from Oregon. A native of California, he served as the 47th president of the Oregon State Senate. Prior to serving in the Senate he was a member of the Oregon House of Representatives.

== Early life ==
Jason Boe was born in 1929 in Los Angeles, California. When he turned 24 in 1953, he made his way north to Oregon to attend school at Pacific University, where he earned a doctorate in optometry. It was during his time at Pacific that he met his future wife, Kathryn. They both shared a common interest in classical music and quickly fell in love and married. After Boe earned his doctorate, he and Kathryn moved to Reedsport, Oregon, where he began his optometry practice.

In 1958, Boe successfully sought a seat on the Reedsport City Council.

== Legislative career ==
Boe sought a seat in the Oregon State Legislature, and in 1964 he was elected to the Oregon House of Representatives. He served for three consecutive terms, from 1964 to 1970. He was elected to the Oregon State Senate in 1970 and served there until 1980.

In 1973 (the 57th Oregon Legislative Assembly), he broke up a coalition of conservative Democrats and Republicans to be elected Senate President. In the 1975 session, he was challenged by fellow Democrat Betty Roberts for the position, but prevailed, in part due to the decision of independent Charles Hanlon to join the Democratic Party and support Boe. Boe remained Senate President for four consecutive terms.

From 1978 to 1979, Boe was president of the National Conference of State Legislatures.

President Jimmy Carter appointed Boe to the Advisory Commission on Intergovernmental Relations on October 11, 1979.

== Later years ==
Jason Boe retired from elective office after his 1980 failed bid for Oregon State Treasurer. He later owned Jason Boe & Associates, Inc., an international consulting firm that had offices in both Taiwan and Korea. he died of a heart attack in Portland Oregon on March 20, 1990 at age 61.

== Legacy ==
The Senate wing of the Oregon State Capitol is named in Boe's honor.

In 1997, a stretch of Oregon Route 38 that lies between the communities of Drain and Reedsport was designated the "Jason Boe Corridor".

== Electoral history ==
1968 Democratic Primary
Candidate name	Votes
Jason Boe	10,005

1968 General Election
Candidate name	Votes
Jason Boe (D)	16,236
Paul L. Hurlocker (R)	8,980

== See also ==
- List of Oregon Legislative Assemblies
