= Fred Jones (footballer, born 1909) =

Welsh footballer

Personal information
- Full name: Frederick Jones
- Date of birth: 26 August 1909
- Place of birth: Pontypool, Wales
- Date of death: August 1994 (aged 84–85)
- Place of death: Chelmsford, England
- Height: 5 ft 10 in (1.78 m)
- Positions: Centre forward; right half

Senior career*
Years	Team	Apps	(Gls)
- All Saints
- Pontnewydde
- Aberaman Athletic
- Pontypridd
1933–1934	Swansea Town	6	(0)
1934	Notts County	1	(0)
1934–1936	Millwall	9	(1)
1936–1938	Folkestone		
1938–1939	Ipswich Town	32	(12)
- Chelmsford City
- * Club domestic league appearances and goals

Frederick Jones (26 August 1909 – August 1994) was a Welsh professional footballer who played in the Football League for Ipswich Town, Millwall, Swansea Town and Notts County as a centre forward.

== Career statistics ==
Appearances and goals by club, season and competition
Club	Season	League			FA Cup		Other		Total	
Club	Season	Division	Apps	Goals	Apps	Goals	Apps	Goals	Apps	Goals
Millwall	1934–35	Third Division South	1	0	0	0	―		1	0
Millwall	1935–36	Third Division South	8	1	0	0	―		8	1
Millwall	Total		9	1	0	0	―		9	1
Ipswich Town	1937–38	Southern League	12	4	0	0	0	0	14	5
Ipswich Town	1938–39	Third Division South	20	8	2	2	3 (Note: Appearances in Third Division South Cup)	0	27	10
Ipswich Town	Total		32	12	2	2	3	0	37	15
Career total			41	13	2	2	3	0	46	16
