= Terie Norelli =

American politician

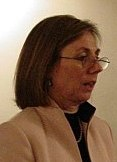

Speaker of the New Hampshire House of Representatives
- In office December 5, 2012 – December 3, 2014
- Preceded by: William L. O'Brien
- Succeeded by: Shawn Jasper
- In office December 2006 – December 2010
- Preceded by: Doug Scamman Jr.
- Succeeded by: William L. O'Brien

Minority Leader of the New Hampshire House of Representatives
- In office December 2010 – December 5, 2012
- Preceded by: Sherman Packard
- Succeeded by: Gene G. Chandler

President of the National Conference of State Legislatures
- In office 2012–2013
- Preceded by: Stephen Morris
- Succeeded by: Bruce Starr

Member of the New Hampshire House of Representatives from the Rockingham 16th district
- In office 1996 – December 2014
- Preceded by: Rebecca McBeath

Personal details
- Born: July 7, 1952 (age 74) Orange, New Jersey, U.S.
- Party: Democratic
- Spouse: Allen
- Profession: Educator, Non-Profit CEO

Terie Norelli is a Democratic former member of the New Hampshire House of Representatives, serving the Rockingham 16th District and later 26th District from 1996 through 2014. She served as Speaker of the House for six years, from 2006 to 2010 and from 2012 to 2014. When Republicans regained control of the New Hampshire House in 2010, she became the Democratic minority leader. Norelli was the first Democratic speaker of the New Hampshire House in 84 years. When the Democrats regained control of the New Hampshire House in 2012, she was elected to the role of speaker again.

== Political career ==
Her first terms as speaker included such legislative milestones as the passage of a marriage equality bill that allowed Gov. John Lynch (New Hampshire governor) to be the first governor to sign into law a comprehensive right to marry bill and legislation bringing New Hampshire into the Regional Greenhouse Gas Initiative. During her last term as speaker she worked with the Republican-led senate to pass Gender Pay Equity and to expand Medicaid under the Patient Protection and Affordable Care Act.

Prior to her elevation to the speakership, Norelli also served as the ranking Democrat on the House Science, Technology and Energy Committee, where she was the chair of the Clean Air Subcommittee and was deeply involved in the restructuring of the electric industry and reducing harmful air emissions. She has also served on the Public Works and Highways Committee, the Finance Committee and the Rules Committee.

In addition to her service in the New Hampshire House, Speaker Norelli was elected 40th president of the National Conference of State Legislatures (NCSL) at the organization's 2011 annual Legislative Summit in San Antonio, Texas. Representative Norelli served as president-elect for a year until being installed as president at NCSL's 2012 Legislative Summit in Chicago, Ill. The organization, which rotates leadership positions annually between Democratic and Republican members, serves all the nation's 7,382 state lawmakers as well as all state legislative staff. Norelli was also president of NCSL Foundation from 2013 to 2014, the organization's foundation.

Representative Norelli was active in NCSL for several years prior to her election as president. In addition to having been elected as the organization's vice president in December, 2010, Norelli was co-chair of the Deficit Reduction Task Force and the International Relations Task Force. She has also served as chair of the Standing Committees and co-chair of the working group on NCSL policy and procedure.

Norelli was an active board member of the State Legislative Leaders Foundation from 2007 to 2014. The SLLF is a nonprofit, nonpartisan organization dedicated to the professional development of all Senate Presidents, Speakers of the House, Majority Leaders, Minority Leaders, and Pro Tempore. All SLLF programs focus on two categories: strengthening leadership skills and examining critical public policy issues.

Norelli has long been committed to advocacy for women and girls. She served as chair of both the Sexual Assault Support Services Board of Directors and NARAL-NH PAC Board of Directors. She also served on the NARAL-NH Board and the advisory board of the Portsmouth Feminist Health Center.

She is the recipient of several state and national awards for her work in the Legislature, including the Rainbow Award for Legislative Leader for Statewide LGBT Equality from the Human Rights Campaign, and the Champion of Choice Award from NARAL-NH. Norelli was also named Legislator of the Year by the NH Women's Lobby, and the National Association of Social Workers. She has also received the Public Service Award from the Bi-State Primary Care Association, the Friend of Education Award from NEA-NH, the Legislator of the Year Award from the New England Police Benevolent Association, the Legislator of the Year by the New Hampshire Health Care Association, and a leadership award from the New Hampshire State Grange. She was presented with the Porch Light Award, by A Safe Place and Sexual Assault Support Services (SASS).

She was a central part of the controversy regarding the signing of a pro-Hillary Clinton letter, containing information about Barack Obama's voting record while he was in the Illinois legislature when he avoided voting on several pro-feminist bills, which went out to voters two days before the New Hampshire primary, 2008.

In February 2015, Norelli was named the president and CEO of the New Hampshire Women's Foundation. In this role, she is responsible for leading and managing all aspects of the Women's Foundation, a nonprofit, 501c3 organization, whose mission is to promote opportunity and equality for women and girls in NH through research, education, philanthropy, and advocacy.

Norelli is currently also serves on the advisory board of The Warren B. Rudman Center for Justice, Leadership & Public Policy at UNH Law School.

In 2015, Norelli was appointed Perkins Bass Distinguished Visitor at the Nelson A. Rockefeller Center for Public Policy and the Social Sciences at Dartmouth. Named for longtime New Hampshire U.S. Congressman Perkins Bass, Dartmouth Class of 1934, the distinguished visitors program invites a New Hampshire citizen who has made outstanding contributions in government to share experiences with the Dartmouth community.

Andrew Samwick, director of the Rockefeller Center, spoke to the press about Norelli's appointment. "It is our privilege this year to have Terie Norelli as our Perkins Bass Visitor. Her depth of legislative experience and focus on civility and dialogue comes at a time when the Dartmouth community looks for exactly that type of leadership model. Her involvement with the center this year will afford students a real opportunity to meet and engage with an exceptional leader."

She is featured in two books about women in politics: "Pearls, Politics and Power: How Women Can Win and Lead" by Vermont Gov. Madeleine Kunin, and "Women at the Table: 40 Intimate Profiles of Political Women in the Northeast" by Michaeline della Fera. She is also included in "Legendary Locals of Portsmouth" by Charles McMahon.

On December 19, 2016, Norelli served as one of four members of New Hampshire Electoral College delegation, the first all-female such delegation. The vote was unanimous in support of Sec. Clinton. In advance of the vote, Norelli was one of over 50 electors who petitioned national intelligence director James Clapper to authorize a briefing ahead of the Electoral College's meeting on Dec. 19 to elect the next president. The briefing never took place.

== Personal life ==
Norelli earned a bachelor's degree in mathematics education, summa cum laude and Phi Beta Kappa, at the University of New Hampshire, and was a math teacher at Winnacunnet High School in Hampton, NH, before she ran for the legislature. She lives in Portsmouth, NH with her husband and has two adult children, daughter, Gina, and son, Daniel.

== See also ==
- List of female speakers of legislatures in the United States
