= Robert N. Chamberlain =

American politician

Hon. Robert Nelson Chamberlain
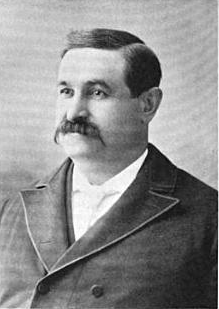

2nd Chief Justice of the New Hampshire Superior Court
- In office January 23, 1917 – September 20, 1917
- Preceded by: Robert G. Pike
- Succeeded by: John Kivel

Associate Justice of the New Hampshire Superior Court
- In office 1904–1917
- Succeeded by: John Eliot Allen

Speaker of the New Hampshire House of Representatives
- In office 1893–1895
- Preceded by: Frank Gay Clarke
- Succeeded by: Stephen S. Jewett

Member of the New Hampshire House of Representatives

Personal details
- Born: July 24, 1856 Bangor, New York
- Died: September 19, 1917 (aged 61)
- Party: Republican
- Profession: Lawyer

Robert Nelson Chamberlain (July 24, 1856 – September 20, 1917) (sometimes spelled Chamberlin) was an American lawyer and Republican politician who served as Speaker of the New Hampshire House of Representatives, and as an Associate Justice and later as the second Chief Justice of the New Hampshire Superior Court.

== Life ==
Chamberlin was born on July 24, 1856, in Bangor, New York, but moved to Berlin, New Hampshire, when he was a child. As an adult, Chamberlain became interested in town and state affairs and became a lawyer, the first lawyer in said town.

Chamberlin became involved with politics, and from 1893 to 1895, he served as the Speaker of the New Hampshire House of Representatives. In 1904, he was appointed as an associate justice of the New Hampshire Superior Court. Chamberlain was appointed as Chief Justice of the New Hampshire Superior Court in 1917 to replace Robert G. Pike who had died.

Chamberlain died in Boston, Massachusetts, on September 19, 1917.

== Notes ==
Political offices
Preceded by Frank Gay Clarke	Speaker of the New Hampshire House of Representatives; 1893 – 1895	Succeeded by Stephen S. Jewett
Legal offices
Preceded by	Associate Justice of the New Hampshire Superior Court; 1904-1917	Succeeded by John Eliot Allen
Preceded by Robert G. Pike	Chief Justice of the New Hampshire Superior Court; January 23, 1917–September 20, 1917	Succeeded by John Kivel
