= Frank G. Clarke =

American politician (1850–1901)

Frank Gay Clarke
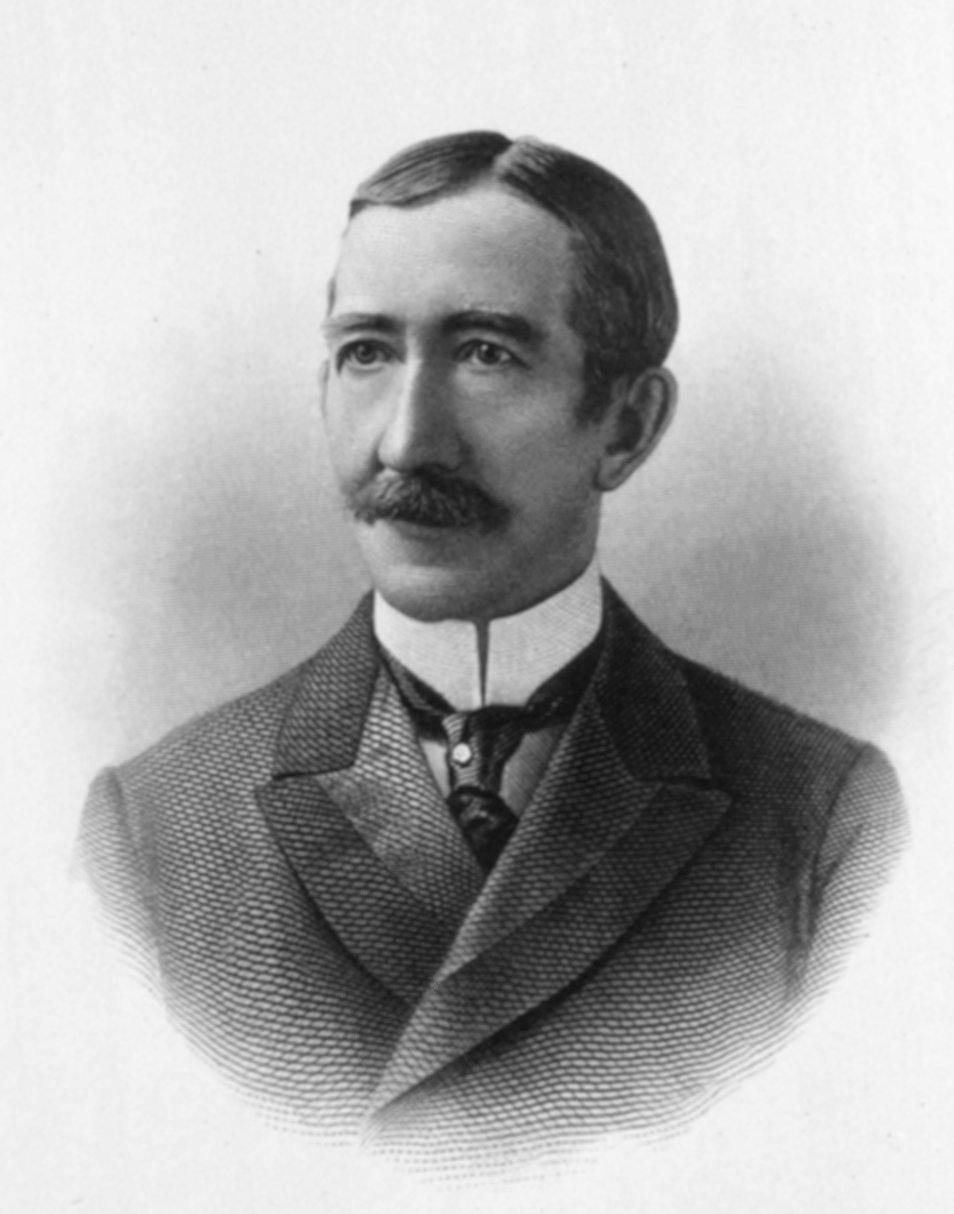

Member of the U.S. House of Representatives from New Hampshire's 2nd district
- In office March 4, 1897 – January 9, 1901
- Preceded by: Henry Moore Baker
- Succeeded by: Frank Dunklee Currier

Member of the New Hampshire Senate
- In office 1889

Speaker of the New Hampshire House of Representatives
- In office 1891–1893
- Preceded by: Hiram D. Upton
- Succeeded by: Robert N. Chamberlain

Member of the New Hampshire House of Representatives
- In office 1885; 1891

Personal details
- Born: September 10, 1850 Wilton, Hillsborough County; New Hampshire, USA
- Died: January 9, 1901 (aged 50) Peterborough, Hillsborough County; New Hampshire, USA
- Resting place: Pine Hill Cemetery; Peterborough, Hillsborough County; New Hampshire, USA
- Party: Republican
- Spouse: Frances A. Brooks Clarke
- Children: Mabel Frances Clarke
- Parent(s): Moses Clarke; Julia Gay Clarke
- Education: Dartmouth College
- Profession: Lawyer; Politician

Military service
- Years of service: 1885 - 1887
- Rank: Colonel
- Unit: staff of Governor Hale

Frank Gay Clarke (September 10, 1850 – January 9, 1901) was an American politician, lawyer, and a United States representative from New Hampshire.

== Early life ==
Born in Wilton, Hillsborough County, New Hampshire, Clarke attended Kimball Union Academy in Meriden, New Hampshire, and earned a Bachelor of Science degree from Dartmouth College in Hanover, New Hampshire, in 1873. He studied law and was admitted to the bar in 1876. He began his practice in Peterborough.

== Career ==
Clarke served as member of the New Hampshire House of Representatives in 1885. He was appointed Colonel on the military staff of Governor Hale and served in that capacity from 1885 to 1887. He was elected and served in the New Hampshire Senate in 1889; was elected to the New Hampshire House of Representatives in 1891, and was chosen Speaker of that body.

Elected as a Republican to the Fifty-fifth and Fifty-sixth Congresses, Clarke served as United States Representative for the second district of New Hampshire from March 4, 1897, until his death.

== Death ==
Clarke died of an aneurysm in Peterborough on January 9, 1901 (age 50 years, 121 days). He is interred at Pine Hill Cemetery, Peterborough.

== Family life ==
Son of Moses and Julia Gay, Clarke married Frances A. Brooks on May 13, 1875 and they had one daughter, Mabel Frances.

== See also ==
- List of members of the United States Congress who died in office (1900–1949)

U.S. House of Representatives
| Preceded by Henry Moore Baker | Member of the U.S. House of Representatives from New Hampshire's 2nd congressional district March 4, 1897 – January 9, 1901 | Succeeded by Frank Dunklee Currier |
Political offices
| Preceded by Hiram D. Upton | Speaker of the New Hampshire House of Representatives; 1891–1893 | Succeeded by Robert N. Chamberlain |
