= James F. Briggs =

American politician (1827–1905)

James Briggs
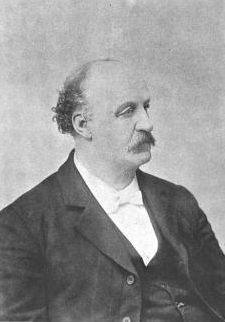

Member of the U.S. House of Representatives from New Hampshire's 2nd district
- In office March 4, 1877 – March 3, 1883
- Preceded by: Samuel Newell Bell
- Succeeded by: Ossian Ray

Speaker of the New Hampshire House of Representatives
- In office 1897–1899
- Preceded by: Stephen S. Jewett
- Succeeded by: Frank Dunklee Currier

Personal details
- Born: October 23, 1827 Bury, England, UK
- Died: January 21, 1905 (aged 77) Manchester, New Hampshire, U.S.
- Party: Republican
- Children: Frank

Military service
- Allegiance: (United States)
- Branch/service: (United States) Union Army
- Rank: Major
- Commands: 11th Regiment, New Hampshire Volunteer Infantry
- Battles/wars: Civil War

James Frankland Briggs (October 23, 1827 – January 21, 1905) was an American politician and a U.S. Representative from New Hampshire.

== Early life ==
Briggs was born to John and Nancy (Frankland) Briggs, on October 23, 1827 in Bury, Lancashire, England. He immigrated to the United States in 1829 with his parents, who had been factory workers in England. The family settled in Holderness (now Ashland), New Hampshire, and attended the common schools and Newbury Academy.

In 1848 Briggs began the study of law in the office of William O. Thompson of Plymouth, New Hampshire. Because his father was dying, Briggs returned home, staying for a year, he continued to study law while at home. Later Briggs went to work for Hon, Joseph Barrows of Holderness, New Hampshire, continuing to study law with Judge Joseph Burrows of Holderness.

== Career ==
Briggs was admitted to the bar in 1851, practicing in Hillsborough, New Hampshire, until 1871. He moved to Manchester.

At the out break of the Civil War Briggs enlisted in the Eleventh Eleventh Regiment, New Hampshire Volunteer Infantry serving as a Major. He was appointed as quartermaster on the staff of Colonel Walter Harriman. After the Battle of Fredericksburg, Briggs resigned but was reappointed and mustered just a month later. he fought In the Siege of Vicksburg and was officially discharged in August 1863.

Briggs served as member of the New Hampshire House of Representatives 1856-1858 and in 1874. Briggs served in the New Hampshire Senate in 1876.

Elected as a Republican to the Forty-fifth, Forty-sixth, and Forty-seventh Congresses, Briggs served as United States Representative for the state of New Hampshire from (March 4, 1877 – March 3, 1883). He served as chairman of the Committee on Expenditures in the Department of War (Forty-seventh Congress). He was not a candidate for renomination in 1882 and resumed the practice of law.

Briggs was again a member of the New Hampshire House of Representatives in 1883, 1891, and 1897, serving as speaker in 1897. He served as delegate to the State constitutional convention in 1889. For the last twelve years of life, he gradually lightened his law practice and entered more into being director and legal advisor to manufacturing and financial institutions.

== Death ==
Briggs died in Manchester, Hillsborough, New Hampshire, on January 21, 1905 (age 77 years, 90 days). He is interred in Green Grove Cemetery, Ashland, Grafton County, New Hampshire.

== Family life ==
Briggs married Roxanna Smith and they had one son, Frank Obadiah Briggs.

U.S. House of Representatives
Preceded by Samuel Newell Bell	Member of the U.S. House of Representatives from New Hampshire's 2nd congressional district March 4, 1877 – March 3, 1883	Succeeded by Ossian Ray
Political offices
Preceded by Stephen S. Jewett	Speaker of the New Hampshire House of Representatives; 1897–1899	Succeeded by Frank Dunklee Currier
