= Fred Jones Jr. =

American entrepreneur

- Born: Fred Jones Jr. January 2, 1948 (age 78); Memphis, Tennessee, US
- Education: Memphis State University
- Title: Founder, Southern Heritage Classic
- Children: 6: Nathaniel Jamal Jones; Derek Andre Polk; Leslie Michele Jones; Natolyn Jhanel Jones Ferguson; Nedra Lucille Jones; Kari Andrea Jones Cook
- Parent(s): Lula Mae and Freddie Jones

Fred Jones Jr. (born January 2, 1948) is an American entrepreneur, entertainment producer and founder of the Southern Heritage Classic, which is an annual HBCU college football game in Memphis, Tennessee.

== Early years ==
Jones was born in Memphis, Tennessee to Lula Mae, a homemaker, and Freddie Jones, a dockworker at the St. Louis terminal dock in Memphis. He was raised in the Cleaborn Homes housing community in south Memphis. He graduated from Booker T. Washington High School in 1966. He worked during the day as an auditor at Union Planters National Bank beginning in 1968 and went to college at night to earn his BBA degree in finance (minoring in accounting) from Memphis State University in 1971. While at Union Planters, he was transferred to the Bellevue branch in 1970 where it just so happened that Stax Records did its banking. That is where he got his introduction into the music industry.

He would attend shows by David Porter and The Soul Children and, backed by his banking background, led to becoming a de facto road manager. That eventually led to a similar job working with soul legend Isaac Hayes in 1971. Hayes was searching for someone to "count money."
