= Fred A. Jones =

American politician from New Hampshire

Fred Andros Jonees

Speaker of the New Hampshire House of Representatives
- In office 1921–1923
- Preceded by: Charles W. Tobey
- Succeeded by: William J. Ahern

Member of the New Hampshire House of Representatives from the Lebanon district
- In office 1913–1923

Personal details
- Born: April 8, 1884 Stoneham, Massachusetts
- Died: July 3, 1964 (aged 80) Lebanon, New Hampshire
- Party: Republican
- Education: Dartmouth College (BA); Harvard Law School (LLB)

Fred A. Jones (April 8, 1884 – July 3, 1964) was an American politician who served in the New Hampshire House of Representatives from the Lebanon district from 1913 to 1923. He served as Speaker of the New Hampshire House of Representatives from 1921 to 1921.
