= Frank D. Currier =

American politician (1853–1921)

Hon. Frank Dunklee Currier
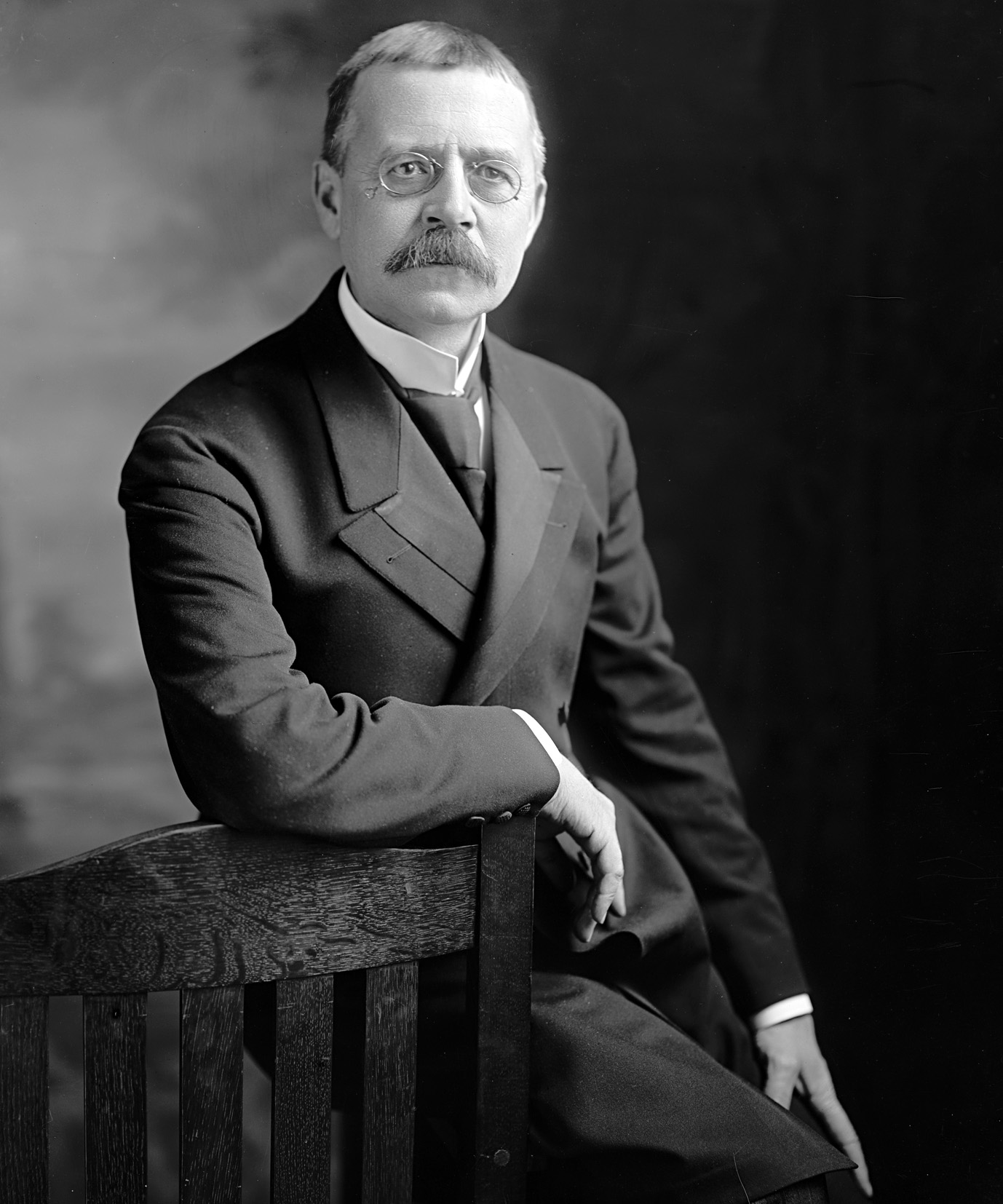

Member of the U.S. House of Representatives from New Hampshire's 2nd district
- In office March 4, 1901 – March 3, 1913
- Preceded by: Frank Gay Clarke
- Succeeded by: Raymond Bartlett Stevens

President of the New Hampshire Senate
- In office 1887–1887
- Preceded by: Chester Pike
- Succeeded by: David A. Taggart

Member of the New Hampshire Senate

Speaker of the New Hampshire House of Representatives
- In office 1899–1901
- Preceded by: James F. Briggs
- Succeeded by: Cyrus H. Little

Member of the New Hampshire House of Representatives

Member of the New Hampshire House of Representatives
- In office 1879–1879

Personal details
- Born: October 30, 1853 Canaan, New Hampshire
- Died: November 25, 1921 (aged 68) Canaan, New Hampshire
- Resting place: Canaan Street Cemetery, Canaan, New Hampshire
- Party: Republican
- Spouse: Adelaide H. Sargent Currier
- Profession: Lawyer; Politician

Frank Dunklee Currier (October 30, 1853 – November 25, 1921) was an American politician and a U.S. Representative from New Hampshire.

== Early life ==
Born in Canaan, New Hampshire, Currier attended the common schools, then Kimball Union Academy in Meriden, New Hampshire, and Doctor Hixon's School in Lowell, Massachusetts.

Currier read law with Mr. Pike of Franklin and was admitted to the bar at Concord in April, 1874, commencing practice in Canaan, New Hampshire.

== Career ==
Currier served as member of the New Hampshire House of Representatives in 1879 and was secretary of the Republican state committee, 1882-1890. He served as clerk of the New Hampshire Senate in 1883 and 1885 and was a delegate to the Republican National Convention in 1884. He continued as member of the state senate in 1887, serving as president of that body. He was appointed and served as naval officer of customs at the port of Boston from 1890 to 1894, then returned to New Hampshire to be speaker of the New Hampshire House of Representatives in 1899. He received an honorary Master of Arts degree from Dartmouth in 1901.

Elected as a Republican to the Fifty-seventh and to the five succeeding congresses, Currier served as United States Representative for the second district of New Hampshire (March 4, 1901 – March 3, 1913). He served as chairman of the Committee on Patents (Fifty-eighth through Sixty-first congresses). During his tenure, a new copyright law was passed in 1909. He was an unsuccessful candidate for reelection in 1912 to the Sixty-third Congress and retired from public life.

Appointed by Governor Felker as Justice of the Police Court in 1913, Currier served for two years.

== Death ==
Currier died in Canaan, New Hampshire, on November 25, 1921. He is interred at Canaan Street Cemetery, Canaan, New Hampshire.

== Family life ==
Son of Horace S. and Emma (Plastridge), Currier was married to Adelaide H. Sargent on May 31, 1890.

U.S. House of Representatives
Preceded by Frank Gay Clarke	Member of the U.S. House of Representatives from New Hampshire's 2nd congressional district March 4, 1901 – March 3, 1913	Succeeded by Raymond Bartlett Stevens
Political offices
Preceded by Chester Pike	President of the New Hampshire Senate; 1887–1887	Succeeded by David A. Taggart
Preceded by James F. Briggs	Speaker of the New Hampshire House of Representatives; 1899–1901	Succeeded by Cyrus H. Little
