= William L. O'Brien =

American politician

Bill O’Brien

Republican National Committeeman from New Hampshire
- Incumbent
- Assumed office March 20, 2023
- Preceded by: Chris Ager

Speaker of the New Hampshire House of Representatives
- In office December 1, 2010 – December 5, 2012
- Preceded by: Terie Norelli
- Succeeded by: Terie Norelli

Member of the New Hampshire House of Representatives from the Hillsborough 5th district
- In office December 5, 2012 – December 7, 2016
- Succeeded by: Gerald Griffin; Glen Dickey

Member of the New Hampshire House of Representatives from the Hillsborough 4th district
- In office December 3, 2008 – December 5, 2012
- Preceded by: Mike Kaelin
- Succeeded by: Steve Spratt; Kermit Williams
- In office December 1, 2004 – December 6, 2006
- Preceded by: Marge Hallyburton
- Succeeded by: Mike Kaelin

Personal details
- Born: William Lawrence O'Brien; July 20, 1951 (age 75) Trenton, New Jersey, U.S.
- Party: Republican
- Spouse: Roxanne
- Children: 3
- Education: Framingham State University (BA); Suffolk University (JD); University of New Hampshire, Concord (LLM)

William Lawrence O'Brien (born July 20, 1951) is a lawyer and Republican legislator from Mont Vernon, New Hampshire who served as a member of the New Hampshire House of Representatives beginning in 2004, representing district Hillsborough-4. He was elected the Speaker of the House on December 1, 2010, when Republicans took control of the House. When Democrats regained control of the House in the 2012 election, O'Brien did not run for a leadership position.

In 2014, after Republicans regained the majority in the New Hampshire House of Representatives, O'Brien ran for Speaker again, but lost to fellow Republican Shawn Jasper.

== Biography ==
O'Brien obtained his bachelor's degree in history in 1974, a Juris Doctor degree in 1977, and an LL.M. in Intellectual Property in 2003.

He has served as the chair of the NH Republican Party Platform Committee, Vice-Chair of the Granite State Taxpayers, and Co-Chair of the House Republican Alliance. He was member of the Mont Vernon School Board and the Mont Vernon Police Advisory Commission. He contributed to a couple of Democratic candidates over 30 years ago, and has since contributed to Republican campaigns and candidates, such as the NH Republican Committee (2006, 2007), John McCain (2008), Republican National Committee (2008), Robert Giuda (2009, 2010), and Ovide Lamontagne (2010).

O'Brien is a member of the New Hampshire Bar and the Massachusetts Bar, former Executive Director of the New Hampshire Legal Rights Foundation, and former equity partner at Finneran, Byrne, Drechsler & O'Brien (Massachusetts). He was a professor of law at the New England School of Law and General Counsel of several companies.

As of 2013, O'Brien and his wife, Roxanne, have been married for 40 years and have three grown children.

== Controversies ==
=== Closing NH House gallery ===
O'Brien temporarily closed the New Hampshire House gallery to the public during a debate about the state budget on March 31, 2011, after union protestors of budget cuts began yelling slogans and chants from the gallery, such as "shame on you" and "don't harass the middle class", thus preventing debate from being heard. When asked why he had temporarily closed the gallery, O'Brien responded, "I think thugs will not rule New Hampshire." O'Brien recessed the House for 10 minutes to allow state police time to clear the gallery.

Assistant Democratic Leader Gary Richardson of Hopkinton asked O'Brien to allow the public back in. Richardson cited a provision of the New Hampshire Constitution, which states, "The doors of the galleries ... shall be kept open to all persons who behave decently." O'Brien refused. The House then voted 217–146 to keep the proceedings closed, with 48 Republicans joining the Democrats in opposing the closing. According to attorney Paul Twomey, O'Brien decided to re-open the proceedings shortly after he called to notify O'Brien's office that he would be filing a lawsuit on behalf of the former lawmakers. O'Brien's staff said that the call had nothing to do with the decision.

O'Brien claimed that the proceedings were not conducted secretly, since they were streamed on live video and the press was present. "The House of Representatives has the right to conduct itself with decorum without being interrupted by members of the public," O'Brien said. Richardson responded, "The Constitution doesn't talk about streaming video. [It says] the doors of the gallery should be kept open." In Merrimack County Superior Court, Judge Richard McNamara heard arguments about closing the gallery and was told that it was open again. He did not issue an order warning O'Brien not to close the gallery again, and the case was dismissed against the Democratic plaintiffs, who chose not to contest or appeal the dismissal.

=== College student voting requirement ===
Remarks by O'Brien to a Tea Party-related group – explaining that a reason for a proposed law imposing more rigorous voter ID and residency requirements to be able to vote in New Hampshire elections, is that college students dominate certain local elections and "take away a town's ability to govern itself" and are "foolish, voting as a liberal" because they lack "life experience" – were widely reported in March 2011.

O'Brien said the bill was "necessary to stop students from basically doing what I did when I was a kid: voting as a liberal."

=== Affordable Care Act and slavery comparison remarks ===
In August 2013, O'Brien spoke at a rally in New Hampshire of the Americans for Prosperity, a conservative political advocacy group, where he likened the Affordable Care Act to an 1850 pro-slavery federal law. In his remarks O'Brien called the healthcare act, popularly known as Obamacare, "a law as destructive to personal and individual liberty as the Fugitive Slave Act of 1850 that allowed slave owners to come to New Hampshire and seize African Americans and use the federal courts to take them back…to slave states." He later defended this characterization in an interview in the Wall Street Journal.

President Obama referred to O'Brien's remark in a September 26, 2013, speech on the Affordable Care Act at Prince George's Community College in Largo, Maryland, saying, "You had a state representative somewhere say that it's as destructive to personal and individual liberty as the Fugitive Slave Act. Think about that. Affordable health care is worse than a law that lets slave owners get their runaway slaves back."

== Post-Speakership ==
After Republicans lost control of the House, O'Brien did not run for a leadership position or seek to serve on a committee. Instead, he transitioned towards running for New Hampshire's 2nd congressional district against Democratic Congresswoman Ann McLane Kuster in the 2014 elections. However, in August 2013, he announced that he would not run. Instead, he became COO of the Cambridge, Massachusetts-based U.S. subsidiary of the German software company Brainloop.

In 2014, Republicans regained the House of Representatives. O'Brien ran for Speaker of the House, but lost to Shawn Jasper. O'Brien is now the President/CEO of technology company RegDOX Solutions and a principal and co-founder of Liberty Tree Consulting & Strategies.

Currently, O'Brien is the Republican National Committeeman for New Hampshire, having been first appointed to complete the newly elected state party chairman's term in March 2023, and then having been elected unopposed in January 2024 to a term that will continue until the close of the Republican National Convention in 2028.

Political offices
Preceded by Terie Norelli	Speaker of the New Hampshire House of Representatives; 2010–2012	Succeeded by Terie Norelli
