= Fred W. Heard =

American politician and priest (1940–2023)

- State Senate President Fred Heard

48th President of the Oregon State Senate
- In office 1981–1982 3 terms = Majority Leader 1975-1980
- Preceded by: Jason Boe
- Succeeded by: Edward N. Fadeley

Member of the Oregon Senate from the 27th district
- In office 1973–1983
- Preceded by: Harry D. Boivin
- Succeeded by: Judy Carnahan
- Constituency: Deschutes and Klamth counties

Member of the Oregon House of Representatives from the 27th district
- In office 1969–1972
- Preceded by: George C. Flitcraft

Personal details
- Born: September 9, 1940 Prineville, Oregon, U.S.
- Died: August 1, 2023 (aged 82) Salem, Oregon, U.S.
- Party: Democratic
- Spouse: Adair
- Profession: Teacher/principal, Asst. Prof, and Episcopal Priest

Fred W. Heard (September 9, 1940 – August 1, 2023) was an American educator, a politician and an Episcopalian priest.

== Biography ==
Fred W. Heard was born in Prineville, Oregon on September 9, 1940. He attended elementary and high school in Klamath Falls. He received his bachelor's degree in education and later his master's in secondary education from Southern Oregon University in Ashland, Oregon. He also earned a Master of Divinity degree from Church Divinity School of the Pacific in Berkeley, California. Heard completed his clinical pastoral education at Oregon State Hospital's Forensics Unit. He served six months as interim minister at the Congregational church in Klamath Falls. In July 2003 he was called to serve as associate rector at Holy Trinity Episcopal Church in Menlo Park, California. In January 2009, Heard was called as rector at Saint Paul's Episcopal Church in Cambria, California. He was called as assisting priest to Saint Paul's Episcopal Church in Salem in September 2014. Heard was called as Vicar of St. Thomas Episcopal Church in Dallas, Oregon in January 2015 and retired in June 2022.

== Career ==
Heard was a teacher at Klamath Union High School in Klamath Falls, Oregon and later was an assistant professor at Oregon Institute of Technology in Klamath Falls. He taught many subjects including language arts and political science in schools and colleges. He was principal of the Falls City, Oregon elementary school.

Heard ran for the State Legislature in 1968 and was elected State Representative. In 1972, he was elected to the Oregon State Senate. He also was majority leader for three consecutive sessions in 1975, 1977, and 1979, and became President of the Senate in 1981. He resigned from the Senate in 1983 when he was appointed Director of Commerce in Governor Victor Atiyeh's Cabinet. Heard was succeeded in the Senate by Judith Carnahan.

Over the years Heard served as a branch manager of Bernard Haldane Associates and was a member of both Menlo Park's and Salem's Kiwanis Club. In the diocese of El Camino Real, he served on the Commission for Ministry. Prior to seminary, he served as a Vestry member & Jr. Warden at St. Paul's in Salem. While at St. Thomas, Fr. Fred was President of the Board for the Compass Ministries on the Western Oregon University campus. In the Diocese of Oregon, he was Dean of the Willamette Convocation, a member of the Diocesan Recovery Commission, a member of the Diocesan Council, and a member of the board for Formation and Mission. He was also past President of the board of trustees for the School for Deacons in Berkeley at the Church Divinity School of the Pacific. During Covid he Co-facilitated a Zoom discussion on racism, and he provided online services for his St. Thomas' congregation while the church was closed.

== Personal life and death ==
Heard was married to Adair for 57 years, and together they had a son Frederick, and twin daughters Heather and Robin. They had six grandsons and one granddaughter. He died on August 1, 2023, at the age of 82.
