= 2014 New Hampshire House of Representatives election =

New Hampshire House of Representatives election, 2014
- November 4, 2014

All 400 seats in the New Hampshire House of Representatives 201 seats needed for a majority
	Majority party	Minority party
Party	Republican	Democratic
Seats before	179	221
Seats won	239	160
Seat change	▲61	▼61
Speaker before election
Democratic
Elected Speaker
Republican

The 2014 New Hampshire House of Representatives elections took place as part of the biennial United States elections. The election on November 4, 2014, the same day as elections to the United States Senate, United States House of Representatives, gubernatorial election and the State Senate. New Hampshire voters elected all 400 members to serve two-year terms in the New Hampshire House of Representatives. All the members elected served in the 164th New Hampshire General Court. In the election, the Republicans gained control of the house from the Democrats.

== Retirements ==
Name	Party	District
Bob Greemore	Republican	Belknap 2
Colette Worsman	Republican	Belknap 2
Richard Burchell	Republican	Belknap 5
Stephen Holmes	Republican	Belknap 5
Charles Fink	Republican	Belknap 6
Harry Merrow	Republican	Carroll 5
Christopher Ahlgren	Republican	Carroll 6
William Butynski	Democratic	Cheshire 1
Jane Johnson	Republican	Cheshire 12
Alfred Lerandeau	Democratic	Cheshire 12
Harry Young	Democratic	Cheshire 14
Charles Weed	Democratic	Cheshire 16
Larry Enman	Democratic	Coos 1
Gary Coulombe	Democratic	Coos 3
Marcia Hammon	Democratic	Coos 5
Ralph Doolan	Republican	Grafton 1
Sid Lovett	Democratic	Grafton 8
Skip Reilly	Republican	Grafton 9
Beatriz Pastor	Democratic	Grafton 12
Bernard Benn	Democratic	Grafton 12
Laurie Harding	Democratic	Grafton 13
Stephen Spratt	Democratic	Hillsborough 4
John Hikel	Republican	Hillsborough 6
John Cebrowski	Republican	Hillsborough 7
Kelleigh Murphy	Republican	Hillsborough 7
Moe Villeneuve	Republican	Hillsborough 7
Peter Ramsey	Democratic	Hillsborough 8
Peter Sullivan	Democratic	Hillsborough 10
Joel Winters	Democratic	Hillsborough 18
Lenette Peterson	Republican	Hillsborough 21
Stephen Palmer	Republican	Hillsborough 23
Robert Willette	Republican	Hillsborough 23
Jill Hammond	Democratic	Hillsborough 24
Angeline Kopka	Democratic	Hillsborough 28
Paul Hackel	Democratic	Hillsborough 29
Michael McCarthy	Republican	Hillsborough 29
Brian Rhodes	Democratic	Hillsborough 30
Jack Kelley	Democratic	Hillsborough 32
David Campbell	Democratic	Hillsborough 33
Douglas Carroll	Democratic	Hillsborough 34
Mary Nelson	Democratic	Hillsborough 35
Mary Ann Knowles	Democratic	Hillsborough 37
Patrick Culbert	Republican	Hillsborough 37
Richard LeVasseur	Republican	Hillsborough 37
Andrew Renzullo	Republican	Hillsborough 37
Richard Eaton	Democratic	Hillsborough 38
Mark Warden	Republican	Hillsborough 39
Gary Daniels	Republican	Hillsborough 40
Jeremy Dobson	Democratic	Hillsborough 43
Eric Palangas	Democratic	Hillsborough 43
George Lambert	Republican	Hillsborough 44
Ronald Boisvert	Democratic	Hillsborough 45
Dennis Reed	Republican	Merrimack 2
Priscilla Lockwood	Republican	Merrimack 9
Gary Richardson	Democratic	Merrimack 10
Jane Hunt	Democratic	Merrimack 15
Rick Watrous	Democratic	Merrimack 16
Candace Bouchard	Democratic	Merrimack 18
Sally Kelly	Democratic	Merrimack 20
Frank Davis	Democratic	Merrimack 20
Chris Andrews	Democratic	Merrimack 23
Mary Beth Walz	Democratic	Merrimack 23
Todd Smith	Republican	Merrimack 24
Franklin Bishop	Republican	Rockingham 3
Gene Charron	Republican	Rockingham 4
Elizabeth Burtis	Democratic	Rockingham 6
Frank Sapareto	Republican	Rockingham 6
Kevin Waterhouse	Republican	Rockingham 7
Marilinda Garcia	Republican	Rockingham 8
Curtis Grace	Republican	Rockingham 11
Regina Birdsell	Republican	Rockingham 13
Kevin St. James	Republican	Rockingham 13
John Sedensky	Republican	Rockingham 13
Jack Hayes	Republican	Rockingham 14
Eileen Flockhart	Democratic	Rockingham 18
Donna Schlachman	Democratic	Rockingham 18
Timothy Copeland	Republican	Rockingham 19
Lawrence Perkins	Republican	Rockingham 20
Aboul Khan	Republican	Rockingham 20
Chris Muns	Democratic	Rockingham 21
Terie Norelli	Democratic	Rockingham 26
Rebecca Emerson-Brown	Democratic	Rockingham 27
Brian Wazlaw	Democratic	Rockingham 29
Joe Scarlotto	Democratic	Rockingham 31
Ken Grossman	Democratic	Strafford 4
Amanda Merrill	Democratic	Strafford 6
Dorothea Hooper	Democratic	Strafford 16
Stephen Ketel	Democratic	Strafford 17
Dale Spainhower	Democratic	Strafford 18
Marsha Pelletier	Democratic	Strafford 20
David Miller	Democratic	Strafford 23
Benjamin Lefebvre	Democratic	Sullivan 1
Linda Tanner	Democratic	Sullivan 9

== See also ==
- United States elections, 2016
- United States House of Representatives elections in New Hampshire, 2016
- New Hampshire gubernatorial election, 2016
- List of New Hampshire General Courts
