= Douglas Carroll =

American politician

Member of New Hampshire House of Representatives for Hillsborough 34
- In office 2012–2014 Serving with Timothy Soucy & Michael Garcia

Personal details
- Party: Democratic

Douglas L. Carroll is an American politician. He represented Hillsborough 34th district on the New Hampshire House of Representatives from 2012 to 2014. In 2012, Carroll and fellow Democrats Timothy Soucy and Michael Garcia, unseated three Republicans, Timothy Twombly, Edith Hogan and Duane Erickson.
