= Michael Garcia (New Hampshire politician) =

American politician

Member of New Hampshire House of Representatives for Hillsborough 34
- In office 2012–2014 Serving with Timothy Soucy & Douglas Carroll

Personal details
- Party: Democratic
- Education: Loyola University Chicago; University of Arizona

Michael Garcia is an American politician. He represented Hillsborough 34th district on the New Hampshire House of Representatives from 2012 to 2014. He was a candidate for Hillsborough 43 in the 2018 House of Representatives election.
