= Inman =

Inman may refer to:

== Places ==
=== United States ===
- Inman, Georgia, an unincorporated community
- Inman, Illinois
- Inman, Kansas, a city
- Inman Square, a neighborhood of Cambridge, Massachusetts
- Inman, Nebraska, a village
- Inman, South Carolina, a city
- Inman, Tennessee
- Inman, Virginia, an unincorporated community
- Inman Township (disambiguation)

=== Canada ===
- Inman, New Brunswick

== Other uses ==
- Inman (surname)
- Inman Line, British shipping company
- Inman News
- Inman Middle School, Virginia-Highland neighborhood of Atlanta, Georgia
- HMS Inman, a British frigate in commission in the Royal Navy from 1944 to 1945
