= James Allard =

James Allard may refer to:

- J Allard, chief executive officer of Project 529
- James W. Allard, American philosopher
- James Allard (politician), American politician
