= Stephen Holmes =

Stephen, Steven or Steve Holmes may refer to:

- Stephen Holmes (political scientist), American political scientist
- Stephen Holmes (politician), American politician
- Stephen Holmes (CIA), diplomatic cover name for American intelligence officer Steven L. Hall
- Steve Holmes (actor) (born 1961), Romanian-born German pornographic actor
- Steve Holmes (footballer) (born 1971), retired English footballer
- Steven Holmes (curator) (born 1965), Canadian curator
- Steven Holmes (rugby league), Australian rugby league footballer
- Stephen Holmes (diplomat), British High Commissioner to Australia 1952–1956
- Stephen Holmes (actor), guest actor in "Gehenna" TV episode
- Stephen Holmes (died 1978), first victim of UK serial killer Dennis Nilsen
- Stephen Holmes, candidate in the 2007 Ontario provincial election
