= Enman =

Enman is a surname. Notable people with the surname include:

- Eliza Enman-McDaniel, Canadian drummer
- Horace Luttrell Enman, Canadian banker, president of Scotiabank
- Kasie Enman (born 1979), American mountain runner
- Larry Enman, American politician

== See also ==
- Elman (surname)
- Inman
