= Richard Eaton =

Richard Eaton may refer to:

- Richard Eaton, the founder of a choir which became the Richard Eaton Singers
- Richard K. Eaton (born 1948), judge for the United States Court of International Trade
- Richard Jefferson Eaton (1806–1847), British politician
- Richard Eaton (American politician), American politician
- Ric Eaton (born 1962), American Olympic weightlifter
- Richard M. Eaton (born 1940), American historian
