= Stephen Ketel =

American politician

Member of New Hampshire House of Representatives for Strafford 17
- In office 2012–2014

Personal details
- Party: Democratic

Stephen M. Ketel is an American politician. He represented Strafford 17th district on the New Hampshire House of Representatives from 2012 to 2014.
