= Dorothea Hooper =

American politician (1932–2024)

Member of New Hampshire House of Representatives for Strafford 16
- In office 2010–2014

Personal details
- Born: November 12, 1932 North Plainfield, New Jersey, U.S.
- Died: January 8, 2024 (aged 91) Dover, New Hampshire, U.S.
- Party: Democratic
- Education: Montclair State University; Kean University

Dorothea (Dot) D. Hooper (November 12, 1932 – January 8, 2024) is an American politician from New Hampshire. She represented Strafford 16th district at the New Hampshire House of Representatives from 2010 to 2014. Hooper was born in North Plainfield, New Jersey. Hooper graduated from Montclair State University and Kean University in New Jersey. She worked as a elementary and high school teacher before moving to Dover, New Hampshire, where she taught at local colleges. She retired as a professor at Southern New Hampshire University and served eight years on the Dover School Board and six years on the Dover City Council.
