= Marcia Hammon =

American politician

Member of New Hampshire House of Representatives for Coös 5
- In office 2012–2014
- Preceded by: John Tholl
- Succeeded by: John Tholl

Personal details
- Party: Democratic
- Education: MacMurray College; Claremont School of Theology

Marcia Hammon is an American politician. She represented Coös 5th district at the New Hampshire House of Representatives from 2012 to 2014. She unseated Reublican John Tholl in 2012. Hammon is an environmentalist.
