= Ken Grossman (politician) =

American politician

Member of New Hampshire House of Representatives for Strafford 4
- In office 2012–2014

Personal details
- Party: Democratic
- Education: University of Massachusetts Amherst

Kenneth "Ken" Grossman is an American politician. He represented Strafford 4th district on the New Hampshire House of Representatives from 2012 to 2014.
