= Brian Rhodes (New Hampshire politician) =

American politician

Member of New Hampshire House of Representatives for Hillsborough 30
- In office 2008–2014

Personal details
- Party: Democratic

Brian D. Rhodes is an American politician. He represented Hillsborough 30th district on the New Hampshire House of Representatives from 2008 to 2014.
