= Peter Ramsey (politician) =

American politician

Member of New Hampshire House of Representatives for Hillsborough 8
- In office 2008–2014

Personal details
- Party: Democratic
- Education: Keene State College

Peter E. Ramsey is an American politician. He represented Hillsborough 8th district on the New Hampshire House of Representatives from 2008 to 2014. In 2025, he was named "Union Leader's Citizen of the Year".
