= Jack Kelley (politician) =

American politician

Member of New Hampshire House of Representatives for Hillsborough 32
- In office 2012–2014

Member of New Hampshire House of Representatives for Hillsborough 26
- In office 2006–2010

Personal details
- Party: Democratic
- Education: Northeastern University

John D. "Jack" Kelley is an American politician. He represented Hillsborough County on the New Hampshire House of Representatives until 2014.
