= Gary Coulombe =

American politician

Member of New Hampshire House of Representatives for Coös 3
- In office 2010–2014

Personal details
- Party: Democratic

Gary Coulombe is an American politician. He represented Coös 3rd district on the New Hampshire House of Representatives from 2010 to 2014. He is a firefighter from Berlin, New Hampshire.
