= Jill Hammond (politician) =

American politician

Member of New Hampshire House of Representatives for Hillsborough 24
- In office 2012–2014

Member of New Hampshire House of Representatives for Hillsborough 3
- In office 2006–2010

Personal details
- Party: Democratic
- Education: Connecticut College

Jill Shaffer Hammond is an American politician. She is a Democrat. She represented Hillsborough County on the New Hampshire House of Representatives until 2014. In the legislature she advocated for universal health care. She is a graphic designer by profession.
