= Rick Watrous =

American politician

Member of New Hampshire House of Representatives for Merrimack 16
- In office 2008–2014

Personal details
- Born: September 24, 1952 (age 73)
- Party: Democratic
- Education: Temple University; University of New Hampshire

Rick H. Watrous (born September 24, 1952) is an American politician. He represented Merrimack 16th district on the New Hampshire House of Representatives from 2008 to 2014.
