= Dale Spainhower =

American politician

Member of New Hampshire House of Representatives for Strafford 18
- In office 2010–2014

Personal details
- Party: Democratic

Dale Spainhower is an American politician. He represented Strafford 18th district on the New Hampshire House of Representatives from 2010 to 2014. He is a firefighter from Dover, New Hampshire.
