= Jack Hayes =

Jack Hayes may refer to:

- Jack Hayes (composer) (1919–2011), American composer and orchestrator
- Jack Hayes (American politician), American politician
- Jack Hayes (British politician) (1887–1941), British police officer, trade unionist and politician
- Jack Hayes (footballer, born 1907) (1907–1971), Australian rules footballer for Footscray
- Jack Hayes (footballer, born 1996), Australian rules footballer for St Kilda
- Jack Hayes (field hockey) (born 1994), Australian field hockey player
