= Harry Young (New Hampshire politician) =

American politician

Member of New Hampshire House of Representatives for Cheshire 14
- In office 2012–2014

Personal details
- Party: Democratic
- Education: State University of New York, Canton

Harry L. Young is an American politician. He represented Cheshire 14th district on the New Hampshire House of Representatives from 2012 to 2014.
