= Joe Scarlotto =

American politician

Member of New Hampshire House of Representatives for Rockingham 31
- In office 2012–2014

Personal details
- Party: Democratic

Joe Scarlotto is an American politician. He represented Rockingham 31st district on the New Hampshire House of Representatives from 2012 to 2014. He is a businessowner in Dover, New Hampshire.
