= Travis Bennett (politician) =

American politician

Member of New Hampshire House of Representatives for Grafton 8
- In office 2014–2018

Personal details
- Party: Democratic
- Education: Plymouth State University

Travis Bennett is an American politician. He was a member of the New Hampshire House of Representatives and represented Grafton 8th district. Bennett is running for Hillsborough County Attorney in 2026
