= Oregon Open (darts) =

Tournament information
- Venue: Embassy Suites
- Location: Portland
- Country: United States
- Established: 1972
- Organisation(s): WDF
- Format: Legs
- Prize fund: $2,500
- Month(s) Played: May

Current champion(s)
- Rory Hansen (men's); Sally Kelly (women's)

The Oregon Open is a darts tournament that has been held in Lincoln City since 1972.

The first editions solely featured women's events; the tournament later held both men's and women's events in 1985, 1986 and from 2008 onwards.

== Results ==
=== Men's ===
Year	Champion	Av.	Score	Runner-Up	Av.	Prize Money			Venue
Year	Champion	Av.	Score	Runner-Up	Av.	Total	Ch.	R.-Up	Venue
1985	(Canada) Bill Steinke	n/a	beat	(United States) John Kramer	n/a	n/a	n/a	n/a	Portland Meadows, Portland
1986	(United States) Gerald Verrier	n/a	beat	(Singapore) Paul Lim	n/a	n/a	n/a	n/a	Milwaukie Elks, Milwaukie
2009	(United States) Jason Merrill	n/a	beat	(Canada) John Husman	n/a	$900	$300	$200	Milwaukie Elks, Milwaukie
2010	(United States) Stowe Buntz	n/a	beat	(United States) Joe Picotte	n/a	$900	$300	$200	Milwaukie Elks, Milwaukie
2011	(Canada) John Husman	n/a	beat	(United States) Steve Arionus	n/a	$900	$300	$200	Embassy Suites, Portland
2012	(United States) Patrick Kithi	n/a	beat	(United States) Chris White	n/a	$900	$300	$200	Embassy Suites, Portland
2013	(United States) Patrick Kithi (2)	n/a	beat	Kevin Luke	n/a	$900	$300	$200	Embassy Suites, Portland
2014	(United States) Chris White	n/a	beat	(United States) Chris Peake	n/a	$900	$300	$200	Embassy Suites, Portland
2015	Chris Lim	n/a	beat	Leonard Gates	n/a	$900	$300	$200	Embassy Suites, Portland
2016	Leonard Gates	n/a	beat	(United States) John Newman	n/a	$900	$300	$200	Embassy Suites, Portland
2017	(Canada) John Husman (2)	n/a	beat	(Canada) Lindsay Richie	n/a	$900	$300	$200	Embassy Suites, Portland
2018	(United States) Lee Bengtson	73.00	3 – 1	(United States) Dave Simerly	66.90	$1,840	$600	$300	Portland Meadows, Portland
2019	(United States) Patrick Kithi (3)	68.50	4 – 3	(United States) Michael Yaksitch	65.70	$1,840	$600	$300	Chinook Winds Casino, Lincoln City
2021	(United States) David Fatum	85.45	6 – 1	(Mexico) Carlos Calderon	71.29	$1,840	$600	$300	Chinook Winds Casino, Lincoln City
2022	Danny Lauby	90.53	6 – 3	Rory Hansen	88.23	$1,840	$600	$300	Chinook Winds Casino, Lincoln City
2023	Kevin Luke	78.49	6 – 4	Rory Hansen	80.81	$1,470	$500	$250	Embassy Suites, Portland
2024	Rory Hansen	83.50	5 – 0	(United States) Jeff Leonard	60.43	$1,640	$540	$270	Embassy Suites, Portland

=== Women's ===
Year	Champion	Av.	Score	Runner-Up	Av.	Prize Money			Venue
Year	Champion	Av.	Score	Runner-Up	Av.	Total	Ch.	R.-Up	Venue
1978	(Canada) Linda Firth	n/a	beat	(Canada) Vicky Odegard	n/a	n/a	n/a	n/a	Portland Meadows, Portland
1985	(United States) Katy Casillas	n/a	beat	(England) Karen Lawman	n/a	$375	$250	$125	Portland Meadows, Portland
1986	(United States) Nadine Yarborough	n/a	beat	(United States) Betty Scoggins	n/a	$340	$200	$140	Milwaukie Elks, Milwaukie
1987	(United States) Lori Verrier	n/a	beat	(United States) Sandy Reitan	n/a	$460	$300	$160	Portland Meadows, Portland
1988	(United States) Lori Verrier (2)	n/a	beat	(United States) Sandy Reitan	n/a	$640	$300	$140	Portland Meadows, Portland
1991	(United States) Anne Lund	n/a	beat	(United States) Lori Verrier	n/a	$360	$120	$80	Portland Meadows, Portland
1992	(United States) Lori Verrier (3)	n/a	beat	(United States) Katy Hopkins	n/a	$390	$150	$80	Portland Meadows, Portland
2002	(United States) Lori Verrier (4)	n/a	beat	(United States) Carole Herriott	n/a	n/a	n/a	n/a	Portland Meadows, Portland
2005	(United States) Darci Miller	n/a	beat	(United States) Naomi Bentz	n/a	n/a	n/a	n/a	Portland Meadows, Portland
2008	(United States) Laraine Hinsen	n/a	beat	(United States) Brenda Roush	n/a	n/a	n/a	n/a	Portland Meadows, Portland
2009	(United States) Debra Parker	n/a	beat	(United States) Carole Herriott	n/a	n/a	n/a	n/a	Milwaukie Elks, Milwaukie
2010	(United States) Carole Herriott	n/a	beat	(United States) Brenda Roush	n/a	$430	$150	$100	Milwaukie Elks, Milwaukie
2011	(United States) Tracey McCann	n/a	beat	(United States) Carole Herriott	n/a	$430	$150	$100	Embassy Suites, Portland
2012	(United States) Brenda Roush	n/a	beat	(United States) Laraine Hinsen	n/a	$430	$150	$100	Embassy Suites, Portland
2013	(United States) Brenda Roush (2)	n/a	beat	(United States) Renee Ripol	n/a	$430	$150	$100	Embassy Suites, Portland
2014	(United States) Carole Herriott (2)	n/a	beat	(United States) Lisa Brown	n/a	$430	$150	$100	Embassy Suites, Portland
2015	(United States) Jennifer Mounts	n/a	beat	(United States) Kelly Papuzza	n/a	$430	$150	$100	Embassy Suites, Portland
2016	(United States) Carole Herriott (3)	n/a	beat	(United States) Jennifer Mounts	n/a	$430	$150	$100	Embassy Suites, Portland
2017	(United States) Lori Verrier (5)	n/a	beat	(United States) Carole Herriott	n/a	$430	$150	$100	Embassy Suites, Portland
2018	(Mongolia) Erdenechimeg Dondov	66.30	3 – 0	(United States) Debbie White	47.60	$1,000	$400	$200	Portland Meadows, Portland
2019	(United States) Renee Ripol	56.40	4 – 3	(United States) Carole Herriott	57.40	$1,000	$400	$200	Chinook Winds Casino, Lincoln City
2021	(United States) Lisa Tyler	62.09	5 – 2	(Slovenia) Tanja Bencic	56.06	$1,000	$400	$200	Chinook Winds Casino, Lincoln City
2022	(United States) Cassy Scantlen	53.38	5 – 4	(United States) Corrine Davis	52.59	$1,000	$400	$200	Chinook Winds Casino, Lincoln City
2023	(United States) Sally Kelly	49.36	4 – 3	(United States) Carole Herriott	48.55	$810	$320	$160	Embassy Suites, Portland
2024	(United States) Sally Kelly (2)	48.39	4 – 2	(United States) Carole Herriott	47.45	$860	$320	$160	Embassy Suites, Portland
