= Palanga (disambiguation) =

Palanga may refer to several places:

- Palanga, a city in western Lithuania
- Palanga, a village in Popeşti Commune, Argeș County, Romania
- Palanga, a village in Amărăști Commune, Vâlcea County, Romania
- Palanga Rural District, in Ardabil Province, Iran

== See also ==
- Eric Palangas (1966–2015), American politician
