= Elizabeth Burtis =

American politician

Member of New Hampshire House of Representatives for Rockingham 6
- In office 2012–2014

Personal details
- Party: Democratic

Elizabeth (Betsy) Burtis is an American politician. She represented Rockingham 6th district at the New Hampshire House of Representatives from 2012 to 2014. She was an unsuccessful candidate for Rockingham 5th district in 2010. She endorsed Martin O'Malley's presidential campaign in the 2016 United States presidential election.

Burtis works in healthcare. She is chief officer for Integrated Health Services at Amoskeag Health in Manchester.
