= Mary Nelson (politician) =

American politician

Member of New Hampshire House of Representatives for Hillsborough 35
- In office 2012–2014

Personal details
- Party: Democratic

Mary S. Nelson is an American politician. She represented Hillsborough 35th district at the New Hampshire House of Representatives from 2012 to 2014.
