= William Butynski =

American politician

Member of New Hampshire House of Representatives for Cheshire 1
- In office 2013–2014

Member of New Hampshire House of Representatives for Cheshire 4
- In office 2004–2012

Personal details
- Born: 1944 (age 81–82)
- Party: Democratic
- Education: Catholic University of America; University of Vermont

William (Bill) Butynski, Sr. (born 1944) is an American politician. He represented Cheshire County on the New Hampshire House of Representatives until 2014. He worked as a Alcohol and Drug Treatment consultant.
