= Don Whitehead =

American journalist (1908–1981)

- Born: April 8, 1908; Inman, Virginia, U.S.
- Died: January 12, 1981 (aged 72)
- Education: University of Kentucky
- Occupation: Journalist
- Spouse: Marie Patterson (m. 1928)
- Children: 1
- Awards: Medal of Freedom; George Polk Award (1950); Pulitzer Prize for International Reporting (1951); Pulitzer Prize for National Reporting (1953)

Don Whitehead (April 8, 1908 in Inman, Virginia – January 12, 1981) was an American journalist. He was awarded the Medal of Freedom. He won the 1950 George Polk Award for wire service reporting.

He was awarded the 1951 Pulitzer Prize for International Reporting, and 1953 Pulitzer Prize for National Reporting.

== Education ==
Whitehead studied at University of Kentucky from 1926 to 1928 but did not graduate.

== Career ==
=== Kentucky ===
Beginning in 1928, Whitehead worked for the newspapers Lafollette Press and the Daily Enterprise in Harlan, Kentucky, and he covered the Harlan County War.

=== World War II ===
Beginning in 1935, he worked for the Associated Press, covering World War II. His beats included coverage of the Eighth Army in Egypt, in September 1942, after which he was transferred to cover the American Army in Algeria. He then covered the Allied invasion of Sicily at Gela, with the First Infantry Division, the Allied invasion of Italy at Salerno, and the Italian campaign. He landed at Anzio in January 1944, then went to London to prepare for the Allied invasion of France. He landed on Omaha Beach on D-Day (June 6, 1944), with the 16th Regiment, of the First Infantry Division, and covered the push from the beachhead, Operation Cobra at Saint-Lô, and the pursuit across France. He got the first story on the Liberation of Paris and covered the U.S. First Army's push into Belgium and into Germany, and the crossing of the Rhine River. He also covered the meeting of American and Russian troops on the Elbe River.

=== Korean War ===
Whitehead covered the Korean War in 1950. He won the 1953 Pulitzer Prize for National Reporting for "The Great Deception", his account of a secret trip to the war zone by President-elect Dwight D. Eisenhower.

=== Stateside ===
He was Washington bureau chief for the New York Herald Tribune, in 1956. In 1934, he worked for a year as a columnist for the Knoxville News-Sentinel before leaving to work as an editor for the Associated Press. His book, The FBI Story was adapted into a 1959 film.

=== Papers ===
His papers are held at the University of Tennessee.

== Personal life ==
Don Whitehead married Marie Patterson on December 20, 1928. They had a daughter, Ruth, and two grandchildren.

== Works ==
- The FBI Story: A Report to the People. Random House, Ishi Press International. 2011 [1956]. ISBN 978-4-87187-335-2.
- Journey Into Crime. Random House. 1960.
- Border Guard: The Story of the United States Customs Service. McGraw-Hill. 1963.
- The Dow Story: The History of the Dow Chemical Company. McGraw-Hill. 1968.
- Attack On Terror: The FBI Against the Ku Klux Klan In Mississippi. Funk & Wagnalls. 1970.
- "A Correspondent's View of D-Day". D-Day: The Normandy Invasion In Retrospect. Milton S. Eisenhower Foundation, University Press of Kansas. 1971.

Posthumous

- John Beals Romeiser, ed. (2004). "Beachhead Don": reporting the war from the European Theater, 1942-1945. Fordham University Press. ISBN 978-0-8232-2412-8.
- John Beals Romeiser, ed. (September 2006). Combat Reporter: Don Whitehead's World War II Diary And Memoirs. Fordham University Press. ISBN 978-0-8232-2675-7.
