= Brian Wazlaw =

American politician

Member of New Hampshire House of Representatives for Rockingham 29
- In office 2012–2014

Personal details
- Party: Democratic
- Education: Fitchburg State College; Boston University; University of New Hampshire

Brian Wazlaw is an American politician. He represented Rockingham 29th district on the New Hampshire House of Representatives from 2012 to 2014.

== Biography ==
Wazlaw was born to James and Helen Wazlaw. Wazlaw is a retired science teacher of 37 years. He is from Portsmouth, New Hampshire. He has served as an election moderator. He attended Fitchburg State College, University of New Hampshire and Boston University. He is on the coordinating committee of Seacoast Friends Preserving Democracy.
