= Chris Andrews (American politician) =

American politician

Member of New Hampshire House of Representatives for Merrimack 23
- In office 2012–2014

Personal details
- Party: Democratic

Christopher R. "Chris" Andrews is an American politician. He represented Merrimack 23rd district on the New Hampshire House of Representatives from 2012 to 2014.
