= Paul Hackel =

American politician

Member of New Hampshire House of Representatives for Hillsborough 29
- In office 2012–2014

Member of New Hampshire House of Representatives for Hillsborough 21
- In office 2006–2010

Personal details
- Died: June 3, 2015
- Party: Democratic
- Education: University of Vermont; Columbia University

Paul L. Hackel (died June 3, 2015) was an American politician. He represented Hillsborough County on the New Hampshire House of Representatives until 2014.

Paul served in the United States Army during the Korean War. In the 1960s and 1970s, he served as president of the Jewish Center and B'nai B'rith in Rutland, Vermont. Paul was a member of the Unitarian Universalist Church.
