= Jeremy Dobson =

American politician

Member of New Hampshire House of Representatives for Hillsborough 43
- In office 2012–2014

Personal details
- Party: Democratic
- Education: Ithaca College

Jeremy Dobson is an American politician. He represented Hillsborough 43rd district on the New Hampshire House of Representatives from 2012 to 2014. He is a member of the school board in Manchester, New Hampshire.
