= Ronald Boisvert =

American politician

Member of New Hampshire House of Representatives for Hillsborough 45
- In office 2012–2014

Member of New Hampshire House of Representatives for Hillsborough 17
- In office 2008–2010

Personal details
- Party: Democratic

Ronald R. Boisvert is an American politician. He represented Hillsborough 17th district from 2008 to 2010 and Hillsborough 45th district on the New Hampshire House of Representatives from 2012 to 2014.
