= Joel Winters =

American politician

Member of New Hampshire House of Representatives for Hillsborough 18
- In office 2012–2014

Member of New Hampshire House of Representatives for Hillsborough 17
- In office 2006–2010

Personal details
- Party: Democratic

Joel Winters is an American politician. He represented Hillsborough County on the New Hampshire House of Representatives from 2012 to 2014. He previously served from 2006 to 2010.
