= Benjamin Lefebvre =

American politician

Member of New Hampshire House of Representatives for Sullivan 11
- In office 2010–2014

Personal details
- Party: Democratic

Benjamin (Ben) P. Lefebvre is an American politician. He represented Sullivan 1st district on the New Hampshire House of Representatives from 2010 to 2014. He is a firefighter from Hanover, New Hampshire.
