= Gary Richardson (New Hampshire politician) =

American politician

Member of New Hampshire House of Representatives for Merrimack 10
- In office 2006–2014

Personal details
- Party: Democratic
- Education: Middlebury College; Boston College

Gary Richardson is an American politician. He represented Merrimack 10th district on the New Hampshire House of Representatives from 2006 to 2014.
