= QSMV Dominion Monarch =

UK passenger and refrigerated cargo liner

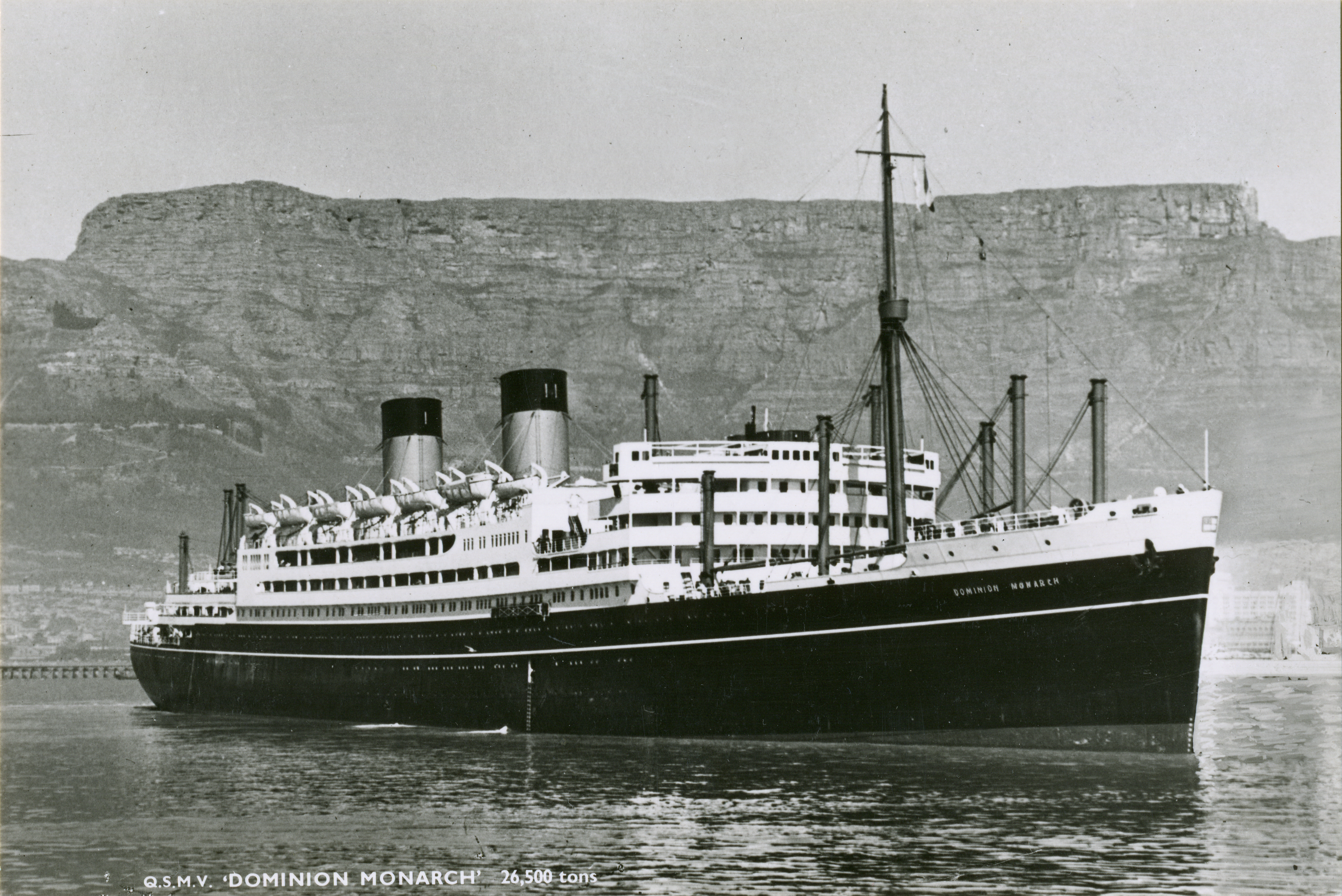
- Dominion Monarch in Table Bay, South Africa, with Table Mountain in the background

History

United Kingdom
- Name: Dominion Monarch (1939–62); Dominion Monarch Maru (1962)
- Owner: Shaw, Savill & Albion Line (1939–62); Mitsui (1962)
- Port of registry: Southampton
- Route: 1939 and 1947–55: London – Las Palmas – Cape Town – Fremantle – Melbourne – Sydney – Wellington; 1955–61: As above, plus: Wellington – Suva – Papeete – Panama – Curaçao – London
- Builder: Swan Hunter and Wigham Richardson
- Cost: £1,500,000
- Yard number: 1547
- Laid down: 14 July 1937
- Launched: 27 July 1938
- Completed: 12 January 1939
- Maiden voyage: 17 February 1939
- Out of service: 21 April 1962
- Identification: UK official number 166828; Call sign: GRGG
- Fate: Scrapped in 1962, Osaka, Japan

General characteristics
- Type: Ocean liner and refrigerated cargo liner
- Tonnage: 27,155 GRT; tonnage under deck 18,390; 15,813 NRT
- Length: 657.6 ft (200.4 m) p/p
- Beam: 84.8 ft (25.8 m)
- Draught: 34 ft 1 1/2 in (10.40 m)
- Depth: 44.4 ft (13.5 m)
- Decks: 6
- Installed power: 5,056 NHP or 32,000 bhp
- Propulsion: 4 × Marine diesel engines; 4 × screws
- Speed: 21.5 knots (39.8 km/h)
- Capacity: 1939–40: 525 1st class passengers; 1940–47: 3,556 troops; 1948–62: 508 1st class passengers; Holds: 650,000 cubic feet (18,000 m^{3}), taking about 3,600 tons general cargo & 12,800 tons frozen meat or dairy produce
- Crew: 385 (in civilian service)
- Sensors & processing systems: Wireless direction finding; Echo sounding device; Gyrocompass
- Armament: DEMS from September 1939: 1 × BL 6-inch Mk VII naval gun; 1 × Anti-aircraft gun (type not known); Armament upgraded December 1940
- Notes: 1939 records: World's most powerful motor liner; Fastest voyage from Britain to Australia via Cape of Good Hope; Largest merchant ship to Australia; Largest merchant ship to New Zealand; All time record: Largest passenger and cargo liner with all first-class accommodation

QSMV Dominion Monarch was a UK passenger and refrigerated cargo liner. Her name was a reference to the Dominion of New Zealand. The prefix "QSMV" stood for quadruple-screw motor vessel.

The ship was built in England in 1937–39, and when new, she set a number of records for her size and power. She operated between Britain and New Zealand via Australia in civilian service 1938–40 and 1948–62 and was a troop ship 1940–47. She spent half of 1962 in the Port of Seattle as a floating hotel for the Century 21 Exposition, and was then scrapped in Japan.

== Building ==
Swan Hunter and Wigham Richardson of Wallsend, built Dominion Monarch as yard number 1547 for Shaw, Savill & Albion Line. Her keel was laid on 14 July 1937 in one of Swan Hunter's West Yards. She represented a transition in steel shipbuilding, as the decks and butts of her topside plating were assembled by electric welding (then relatively new in British shipyards) but the rest of her hull were assembled by the more traditional method of rivetting. She cost £1,500,000 to build.

Eleanor, Lady Harrison, wife of Frederick Lewis, 1st Baron Essendon launched the ship on 27 July 1938. The London & North Eastern Railway laid on a special train that ran non-stop from London to Wallsend. Hauled by locomotive No. 4492 Dominion of New Zealand, it carried dignitaries including the High Commissioners of Australia, South Africa, Southern Rhodesia and New Zealand. Baron Essendon was Chairman of Furness Withy, which had been Shaw, Savill & Albion's parent company since 1933.

Dominion Monarch set a number of records. She was the largest ship built on the River Tyne since Swan Hunter had built the 31,938 GRT Cunard Liner RMS Mauretania in 1906. She was primarily a cargo liner, being built with accommodation for only 525 passengers. She had 160 single cabins and 182 multiple-berth cabins, including two de luxe suites. Her public rooms included a cinema, games deck, a 24 feet (7.3 m) by 16 feet (4.9 m) open air swimming pool, a separate dining room for children, and Jacobethan-style smoking room complete with fireplace and mullioned windows. Several of her public rooms were air conditioned. All her accommodation was first class, and she remains the largest cargo liner with all first-class passenger accommodation ever built.

Dominion Monarch was the world's most powerful motor liner. She was powered by four William Doxford & Sons five-cylinder two-stroke single-acting diesel engines, each of 28 9/16 inches (72.5 cm) bore by 88 9/16 inches (2.25 m) stroke. Two engines were built by Swan Hunter and two under licence by Sunderland Forge. The engines were the largest that Doxford's had constructed. Together they gave her a rating of 5,056 NHP or 32,000 bhp, a top speed of 21.5 knots (39.8 km/h) and cruising speed of 19.2 knots (35.6 km/h) at an engine speed of 123 rpm.

The ship had four 100 lb_{f}/in^{2} double-ended auxiliary boilers. Onboard electricity was supplied by five six-cylinder 900 bhp Allen diesel engines, each powering a 600 kW 220 volt generator. Much of her cargo space was refrigerated. Her navigation equipment included wireless direction finding, and echo sounding device and a gyrocompass.

Dominion Monarch was completed on 12 January 1939. On 28 January, she had her sea trials off St Abb's Head, Berwickshire, Scotland. before sailing to London, where she was docked at the King George V Dock in the evening of 29 January. She was then handed over to her owners, who registered her in Southampton.

== Pre-war service ==
The new ship sailed from North East England to London to load cargo for her maiden voyage. Facilities there had been upgraded in preparation for her, with eight new three-ton capacity electric cranes having been installed on the north quay of the King George V Dock. She left London on 17 February 1939, and made her first call at Southampton where she embarked passengers for Australia and New Zealand. She then called at Tenerife in the Canary Islands for bunkers, Cape Town and Durban in South Africa; and Fremantle, Melbourne, and Sydney in Australia. On 24 April 1939 she reached Wellington in New Zealand, where she had a slight collision with the crane vessel Hikitia. Dominion Monarch also visited Napier, New Zealand. Her voyage set more records, including fastest passage from Britain to Australia via the Cape of Good Hope, largest ship to serve Australia, and largest ship to serve New Zealand. On the Durban to Fremantle leg, she averaged 19.97 knots (36.98 km/h).

After her maiden voyage, Dominion Monarch switched from Tenerife to Las Palmas for her regular refueling stop in the Canary Islands. Her regular journey time between Southampton and Wellington was 35 days. Shaw, Savill and Albion promoted the service as "The Clipper Route", and fares began at £58. With the break bulk cargo handling techniques of her era the ship was able to make three round trips a year, spending almost as much time unloading and loading in Britain and New Zealand as voyaging at sea.

== Second World War service ==
On her third voyage from Britain Dominion Monarch was en route from Fremantle to Melbourne on 3 September 1939, the day that France and Britain declared war on Germany. Her crew began painting her grey, and on 8–9 September she called at Sydney, where she was armed with two guns. One was an obsolescent BL 6-inch Mk VII naval gun that had been salvaged from the 1899 battleship HMS Venerable when she was scrapped in 1920; the other was an anti-aircraft gun whose field of fire had to be limited to avoid hitting the liner's own funnels. She reached Wellington on 12 September, spent 17–23 September in Lyttelton for cargo, called at Wellington again on 28 September, and berthed at Auckland for a week from 30 September to embark passengers. On 7 October she left for Britain, calling at Sydney, Melbourne, Fremantle, Durban, Cape Town in South Africa and Freetown in Sierra Leone before reaching The Downs in the North Sea off Kent on 28 November. The Admiralty considered requisitioning her as a troop ship, but at this stage rejected her as too luxurious.

Dominion Monarch was laid up for six weeks in Tilbury but then resumed her route, sailing on 9 January 1940 via Cape Town, Fremantle and Melbourne to Sydney, where she arrived on 12 February. This time, she did not continue to New Zealand, but spent 11 days at Sydney before starting her return voyage on 23 February. Because of the German submarine threat, she attracted few passengers in either direction, so on the return voyage from Australia, much of her passenger accommodation carried extra cargo. Her public rooms were stacked with crates of fruit and vegetables, and bales of wool were stowed on her games deck. She called at Melbourne and Cape Town, and reached The Downs on 1 April.

The ship left Britain again on 28 April 1940. In wartime merchant and naval ships were blacked out, including their navigation lights. In May Dominion Monarch collided with a coaster that was part of a convoy in the English Channel. Damage seems to have been slight, as she continued via Cape Town to Australia, calling at Fremantle, Adelaide and Melbourne before reaching Sydney on 6 June.

On her return voyage Dominion Monarch embarked 100 Australian soldiers in Sydney and brought them via Melbourne, Cape Town and Freetown to Liverpool in England, where she arrived on 29 July. At this time, she was still an unconverted civilian liner, housing the 100 troops in a ship built for 525.

=== Troop ship ===
In June 1940 Italy entered the war and France surrendered to Germany, which neutralised the French Navy, gave the Kriegsmarine submarine bases on the French Atlantic coast, and made the Mediterranean almost impassable for Allied shipping. Allied merchant and troop ships had to take much more circuitous routes to reduce the risk of submarine attack, so more ships were needed to move the same number of personnel, and amount of goods and material. The need for troop ships was therefore increased, and in August 1940 the Admiralty requisitioned Dominion Monarch at Liverpool. She then spent six weeks in Liverpool while she was converted to carry 142 officers and 1,341 other ranks.

On 10 September the ship left Liverpool carrying an anti-aircraft regiment to Egypt. To avoid the Mediterranean she sailed with Convoy AP 3/1 via Cape Town, reaching Suez in Egypt on 22 October. She was then sent via Colombo in Ceylon, and Fremantle and Melbourne, to Sydney where she arrived on 22 November. There she was drydocked at Cockatoo Island Dockyard, the armament was increased and the troop accommodation was modified because it did not conform to Australian regulations. She left on 3 December and reached Wellington on the 6th, where she loaded cargo and embarked 1,434 New Zealand troops.

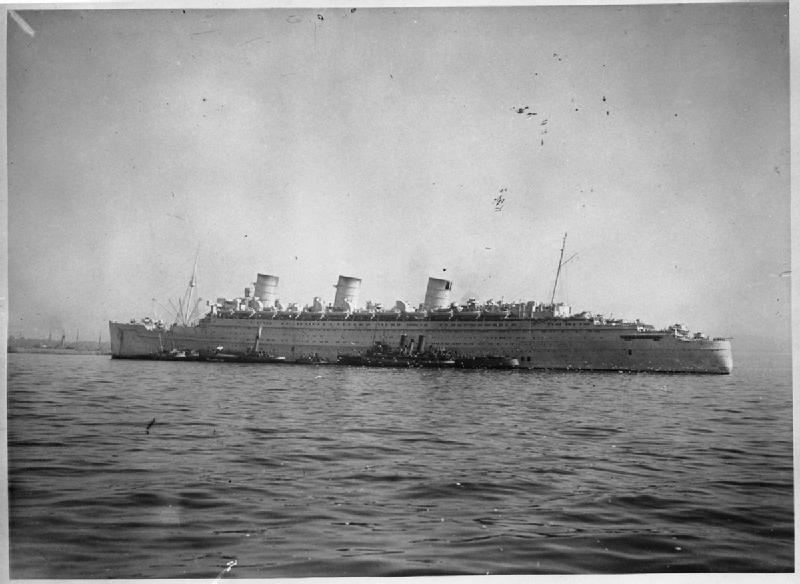
RMS Queen Mary was the largest of six troop ships in Convoy US 8

At Wellington Dominion Monarch formed part of Convoy US 8. This was a fleet of troop ships that included three of Cunard White Star's largest ocean liners: the 81,235 GRT RMS Queen Mary, 45,674 GRT RMS Aquitania and 35,738 GRT RMS Mauretania, which between them embarked 11,372 troops. Canadian Pacific's 16,810 GRT RMS Empress of Russia and another troop ship carried another 2,892 troops and were part of the convoy as far as Sydney.

The total number of troops on the convoy was nearly 15,700, and Government representatives and a large number of citizens bade them farewell with a public ceremony when the convoy sailed on 19 December. The cruisers HMAS Sydney, HMAS Canberra and HMNZS Leander escorted the convoy, which called at Fremantle before reaching Trincomalee and Colombo in Ceylon in January 1941, whence Dominion Monarch continued with Convoy US 8/1 to Egypt. She again collided with a coaster, this time off Perim in the Bab-el-Mandeb at the entrance to the Red Sea. She sustained only minor damage, continued through the Suez Canal, and reached Port Said on 29 January. There she narrowly avoided being hit in an air raid before leaving two days later.

Dominion Monarch was carrying a full cargo of frozen meat and dairy produce from New Zealand to Britain, and after disembarking her troops she returned through the Suez Canal, reaching Suez on 3 February. She left Suez on 6 February with Convoy SU 1A, which dispersed in the Indian Ocean. En route she embarked 300 Abyssinian refugees from the East African Campaign and took them to Mombasa in Kenya. She then continued via Cape Town to Liverpool, where she arrived on 18 March 1941.

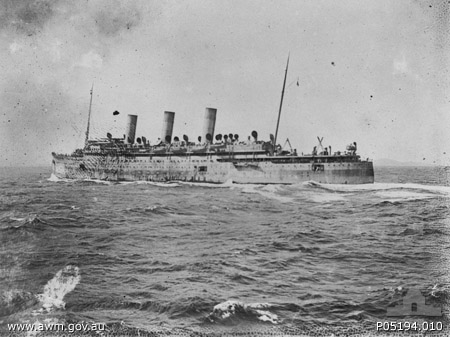
Canadian Pacific's RMS Empress of Russia was with Dominion Monarch in Convoys US 8, TC 12B, WS 12 and WS 17

The ship spent five weeks in Liverpool, leaving on 24 April for the Firth of Clyde where she became part of Convoy WS 8/A. This left on 26 April and took her via Freetown to Durban, whence she continued unescorted via Durban and Wellington, reaching Auckland on 7 July. After a fortnight in port she left Auckland on 22 July for Liverpool, but this time via the Pacific Ocean and Panama Canal. She called at Curaçao on 10 August and reached Halifax, Nova Scotia on the 16th to await a convoy to Britain. She became part of Convoy TC 12B, which also included P&O's 23,722 GRT troop ship Stratheden and CP's Empress of Russia. TC 12B left Halifax on 26 August for the Firth of Clyde, and Dominion Monarch continued to Liverpool where she arrived on 1 September. The ship spent September 1941 in Liverpool.

=== Three times around the world ===
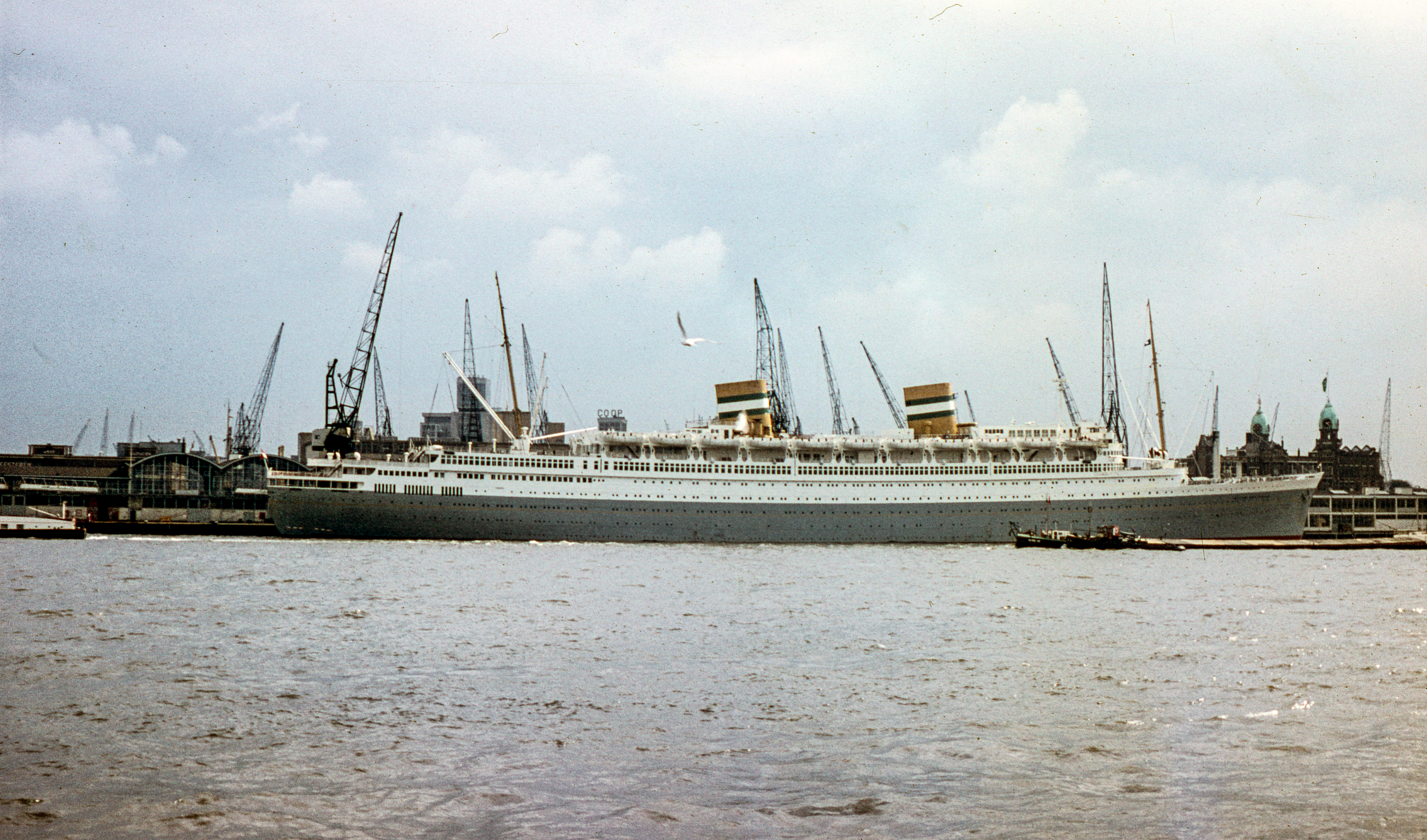
Holland America Line's flagship Nieuw Amsterdam in peacetime colours. As a troop ship, Nieuw Amsterdam sailed with Dominion Monarch in Convoy WS 12 in 1941, and Convoy US 19 in 1943.

Britain, her Allies and the United States were increasingly concerned at Japanese aggression in the Far East. Dominion Monarch embarked 1,672 troops – 238 more than her usual capacity – and on 29 September left Liverpool in Convoy WS 12, which was carrying more than 41,500 troops to the Far East. WS 12 had 19 troop ships, including Holland America Line's 36,287 GRT Nieuw Amsterdam, P&O's 22,284 GRT RMS Strathaird and four Canadian Pacific troop ships: RMS Empress of Japan, RMS Empress of Canada, Empress of Russia and Duchess of Richmond. WS 12 reached Freetown on 14 October, where Dominion Monarch left five days later for Cape Town and the Indian Ocean. At sea on 17 November the cruiser HMS Glasgow met a group of ships from Convoy WS 12 – Dominion Monarch, Empress of Canada and Duchess of Richmond and the cargo liner Perseus – to form Convoy WS 12J to Colombo, whence Dominion Monarch and Empress of Canada continued with Glasgow and the destroyer HMS Dragon as Convoy WS 12V, reaching Singapore on 28 November.

At Singapore Shaw, Savill and Albion had Dominion Monarch drydocked and her engines stripped down for overhaul, but on 7 December Japan attacked Pearl Harbor and the next day it invaded Hong Kong and Malaya. Japanese forces rapidly gained air superiority and mounted increasing air raids on Singapore. Dominion Monarch's engines had been dismantled, but her chief engineer and crew rapidly got them reassembled and on 10 December she sailed for the relative safety of New Zealand. Two months later in the Battle of Singapore most of the troops that she had taken to Singapore were either killed or captured and spent the next three and a half years as prisoners of war of the Japanese.

Dominion Monarch reached Auckland on 22 December and spent Christmas 1941 and New Year 1942 there. On 8 January she left carrying 1,157 troops to Britain. Again she crossed the Pacific and passed through the Panama Canal, and on 3 February she reached Halifax to await a convoy. On 11 February she and the Royal Mail Lines 22,209 GRT troop ship Alcantara left with three destroyers as Convoy NA 3 to the Firth of Clyde. Dominion Monarch continued to Liverpool, arrived on 19 February and stayed in port 27 days for repairs.

On 22 March 1942 Dominion Monarch left Liverpool for Orsay, Inner Hebrides, where she became part of Convoy WS 17 to South Africa. WS 17 included Alcantara and several other British troop ships, Netherland Line's Johan van Oldenbarnevelt and the US troop ship Brazil. It called at Freetown and reached Cape Town on 19 April, whence Dominion Monarch sailed independently across the Indian Ocean and reached Bombay on 6 May. She left Bombay on 15 May, called at Colombo, Fremantle and Sydney and reached Auckland on 12 June. She left on Auckland for Britain on 22 June, again going through the Panama Canal and stopping at Halifax to await a suitable convoy. On 21 July she and the liner Letitia left with four destroyers as Convoy NA 13 to the Firth of Clyde. Dominion Monarch continued to Liverpool, arrived on 29 July and stayed in port 24 days for repairs.

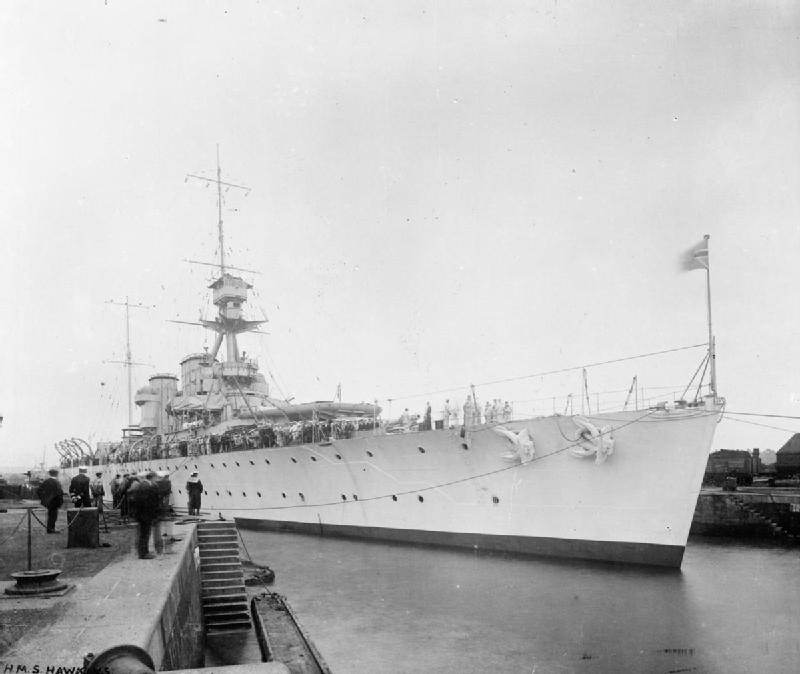
The cruiser HMS Hawkins escorted Dominion Monarch in Convoys WS 22B and WS 26B in the Indian Ocean

On 26 August Dominion Monarch left Liverpool for the Firth of Clyde, where she became part of Convoy WS 22 to India. The convoy's several troop ships included Royal Mail Lines' Alcantara and 25,689 GRT Andes and Orient Line's 23,456 GRT Orcades. WS 22 left the Clyde on 29 August and reached Freetown on 9 September, where Dominion Monarch left four days later for Cape Town and the Indian Ocean. At sea on 11 October the cruiser HMS Hawkins met a group of ships from Convoy WS 22 – Dominion Monarch, Cunard's 20,158 GRT troop ship RMS Franconia, Anchor Line's 16,792 GRT California and four Dutch troop ships including Johan van Oldenbarnevelt – to form Convoy WS 22B, reaching Bombay on 17 October. A week later Dominion Monarch left Bombay for New Zealand, calling at Fremantle and Sydney, reaching Auckland on 16 November and then spending 12 days in port. On 28 November she left for her fourth troop voyage to Britain via the Panama Canal. This time instead of sailing via Halifax to join an eastbound convoy she crossed the Atlantic unescorted, reaching Liverpool on 28 December.

=== Indian Ocean, Egypt and Mediterranean ===
The ship spent New Year 1943 in Liverpool, and after three weeks in port sailed to the Firth of Clyde to start another voyage to the Indian Ocean. Convoy WS 26 to Freetown included Empress of Canada, Duchess of Richmond, Stratheden and California, plus P&O's 20,847 GRT troop ship RMS Mooltan, Union-Castle Line's 19,118 GRT troop ship RMS Arundel Castle and several others, four of them Dutch. It left the Clyde on 24 January and reached Freetown on 6 February, whence Dominion Monarch continued via Durban to the Indian Ocean. At sea on 11 March HMS Hawkins met a group of ships from Convoy WS 26 – Dominion Monarch, Stratheden, Mooltan, California, Royal Rotterdam Lloyd's Dempo and British-India Line's Chyebassa – to form Convoy WS 26B, reaching Bombay on 17 March.

After 10 days in Bombay Dominion Monarch sailed unescorted to Durban, and then to Wellington where she arrived on 30 April. By now her accommodation seems to have been increased, for as well as loading 8,000 tons of cargo and 3,000 bags of mail she embarked 3,535 troops; more than twice the number for which she had been converted in 1940. After a fortnight in port she sailed for Fremantle, where she arrived on 23 May. Jim Smythe notes in his war diary that "it was a fine day, sea very calm" and that the "ship berthed at 1700hrs". There she and Nieuw Amsterdam formed Convoy US 19, which was just the two troop ships sailing together to Colombo. Dominion Monarch continued independently via Aden, and reached Suez on 11 June. Five days later she sailed via Colombo to Cape Town, where she arrived on 10 July and stayed in port for three and a half weeks.

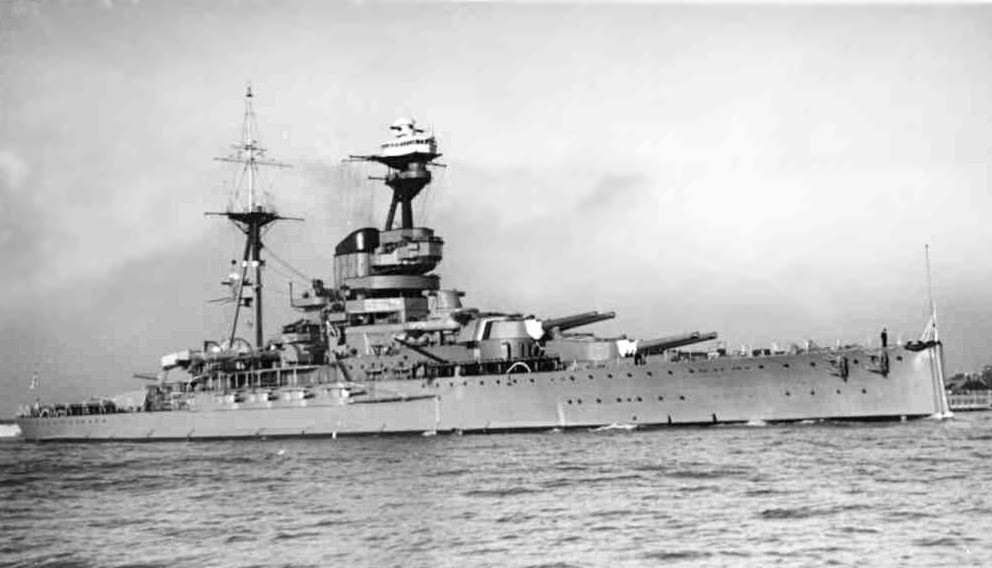
In August 1943 the battleship HMS Resolution and her sister ship Revenge escorted Convoy CF 13, which included Dominion Monarch

In Cape Town she joined Canadian-Australasian Line's 17,941 GRT Aorangi and the battleships HMS Revenge and HMS Resolution to form Convoy CF 13, which sailed on 4 August. It called at Pointe-Noire, French Congo on 11–13 August whence it continued as Convoy CF 13A, reaching Freetown on 24 August. There the four ships were joined by the Dutch troop ship Dempo and became Convoy CF 13B, which left Freetown the next day and reached Gibraltar on 31 August.

By then the Allies had won the North African Campaign and invaded Sicily, and had resumed normal convoys between Egypt and Britain through the Mediterranean. The ship joined Convoy MKF 22, which was on its way from Port Said to the Firth of Clyde, and Dominion Monarch reached Liverpool on 9 September. There, she landed 3,429 troops and remained for a further 25 days for drydocking.

The ship then joined Convoy KMF 25, which left Liverpool on 16 October, went through the Mediterranean bound for Alexandria. Dominion Monarch continued to Port Said, arriving on 31 October. Two days later she sailed in Convoy XIF 3 to Italy, and on 6 November reached Augusta, Sicily where she embarked 3,630 troops. She joined Convoy MKF 25A, which was en route from Port Said to the Firth of Clyde, arriving on 24 November. Dominion Monarch reached Liverpool the next day and spent the next nine days under repair.

=== Transatlantic convoys ===
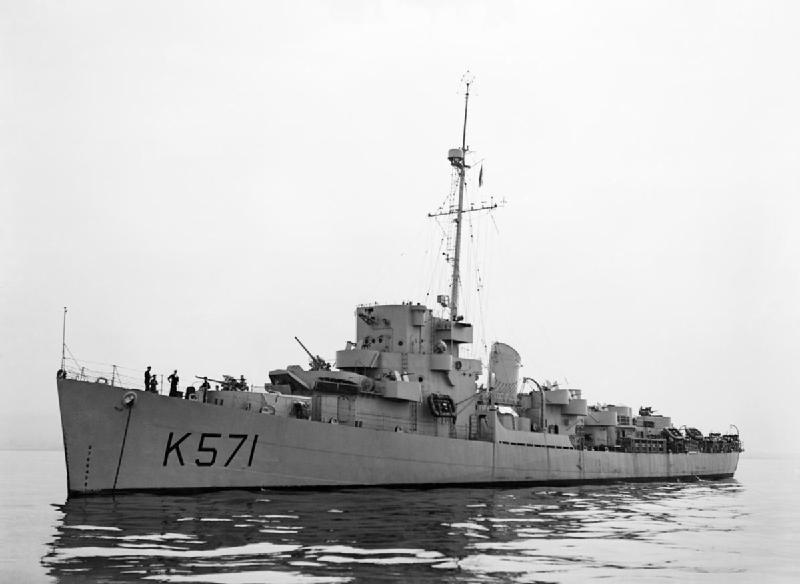
HMS Inman, one of the Captain-class frigates that escorted Dominion Monarch to Iceland and back in August 1944

Dominion Monarch spent the next 18 months operating a transatlantic service between either Liverpool or the Clyde and New York, starting with Convoy UC 45B which left the Mersey on 18 November 1944 and continuing until Convoy UC 68A which reached New York on 28 May 1945. In that time she made six round trips between Britain and New York. Her schedule was interrupted once, in 1944, when the Captain-class frigates HMS Burges and Inman escorted her on a mission from the Clyde to Iceland and back. The three ships left the Clyde on 20 August and returned just four days later.

=== The end of hostilities ===
Dominion Monarch next carried captured German prisoners of war to Australia, reaching Darling Harbour in Sydney, NSW on 17 June 1945. By the end of hostilities, she had carried more than 90,000 military personnel. They included 29,000 members of the US armed forces to the UK, and 1,900 wounded servicemen from Cape Town to Britain. She carried more than 70,000 tons of cargo between Australasia and the UK, including 51,500 tons of butter, cheese and meat from Australia and New Zealand to Britain. In six years of war, she covered 350,000 miles.

The ship was next engaged repatriating New Zealand troops home. In late 1945, she brought the Māori Battalion home, arriving at Pipitea Wharf, Wellington on 23 January 1946. Dominion Monarch was not released from UK Government service until 21 July 1947, when she was paid off at King George V Dock, London.

== Post-war civilian service ==
Dominion Monarch returned to the Tyne where Swan Hunter refitted her as a civilian liner again. This took 15 months, during which she was converted to carry 508 passengers, all First Class. The refit cost £1,500,000 – as much as she had cost to build. She resumed civilian service on 16 December 1948, leaving Britain with passengers and 10,000 tons of cargo for Australia and New Zealand. The crew was a motley collection, there were fights among them and the ship was nicknamed the "Dominion Maniac" or "The Bucket of Blood".

Of the 508 passenger berths, 100 were set aside for passengers between Britain and Cape Town. These were priced at £150 8s 0d, only slightly more than the fare on the competing Union-Castle Line service.

The New Zealand cricket team sailed from Wellington on Dominion Monarch on 26 February 1949 for their summer tour of England. They arrived at Southampton on 2 April. Following a tour of South Africa, the All Blacks rugby union team left Durban on 23 September 1949 for their return home. In 1950 the ship was fitted with a new set of propellers, which gave her quieter running. She spent 5–23 May 1953 at Wallsend slipway for an extensive overhaul. The South African cricket team arrived at Perth, Australia on Dominion Monarch on 14 October 1953 for a tour series.

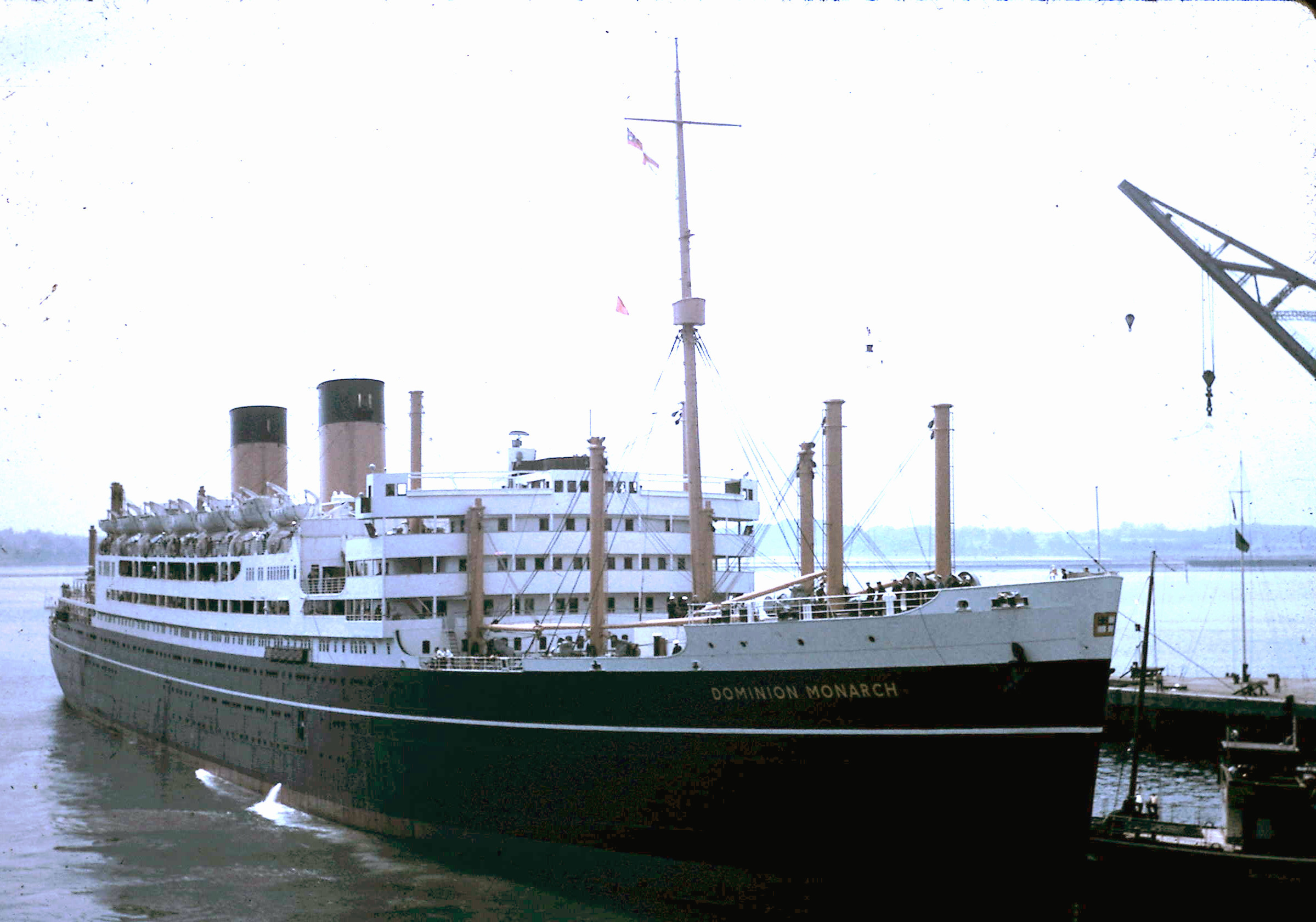
Dominion Monarch in Southampton, summer 1960

In 1955, the 20,204 GRT Southern Cross was completed and joined the Shaw Savill fleet, displacing Dominion Monarch as flagship. The two ships inaugurated a round the world service in alternate directions, extending the London – Cape Town – Australia – Wellington route via Fiji, French Polynesia, Panama and Curaçao back to London.

On one occasion in the latter part of 1961, Dominion Monarch collided with the end of the pier in Sydney Harbour. The damage caused minor flooding in the crew quarters during a storm while crossing the Great Australian Bight.

On 27 June 1961, Vickers-Armstrongs on the Tyne launched Dominion Monarch's replacement, the 24,731 GRT Northern Star. Dominion Monarch left London for the last time on 30 December 1961. In February 1962 she was sold to Mitsui for £400,000 and on 15 March she left Wellington for the last time. She arrived at Southampton on or about 22 April. After disembarking her passengers, she sailed to London to unload her cargo. On 10 July Northern Star entered service in her stead.

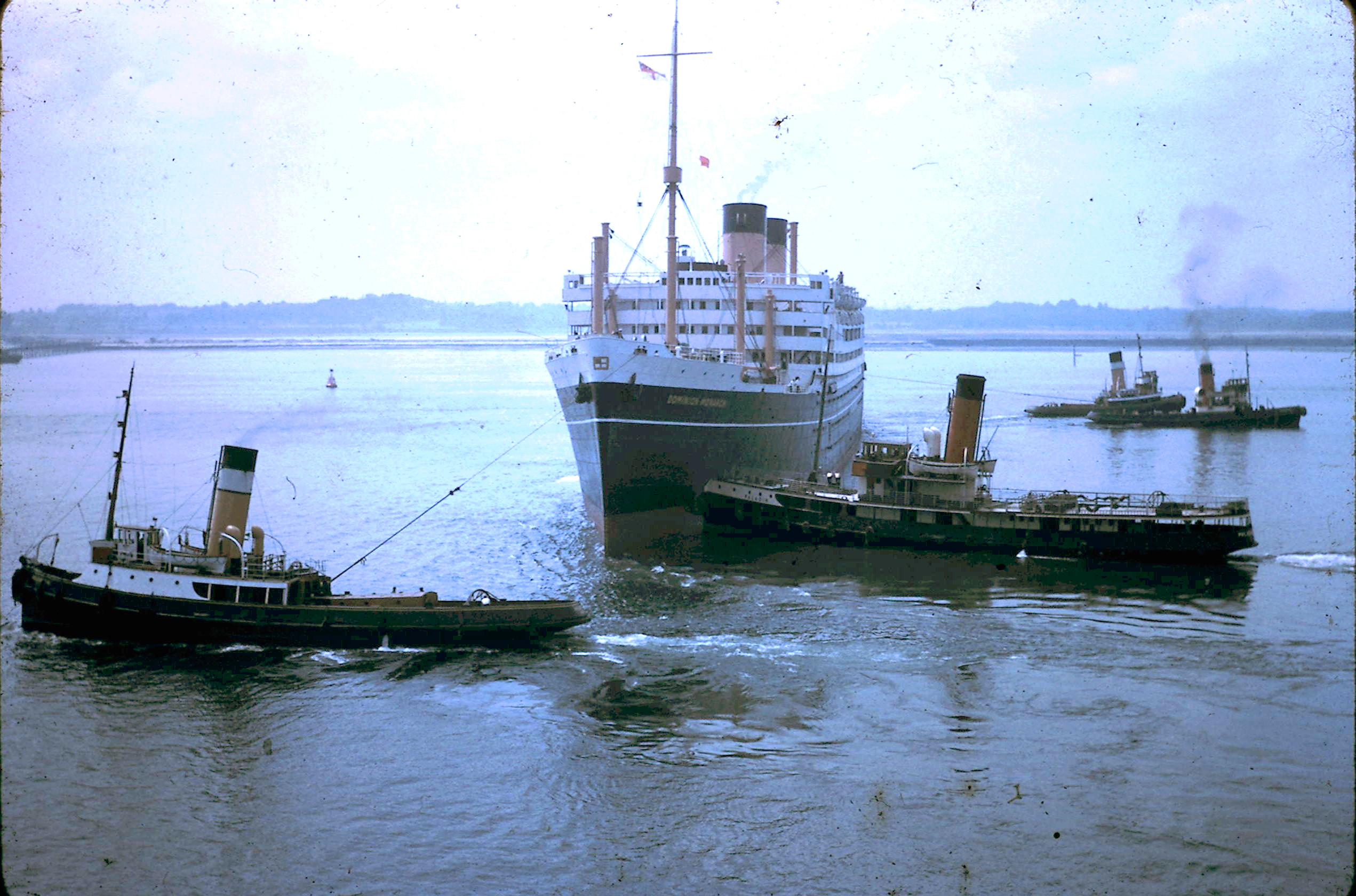
Dominion Monarch leaving Southampton, summer 1960

== Century 21 Exposition and scrapping ==
From June to November 1962 Mitsui leased Dominion Monarch as a floating hotel and entertainment centre for Seattle's Century 21 Exposition, along with the Mexican-owned Acapulco and Canadian-owned Catala. She arrived at Seattle on 29 May 1962. The onboard hotel was managed by Western Hotels. Accommodation demand was less than predicted, Dominion Monarch's US charterer lost $200,000 and her charter was reduced by several weeks. The exhibition closed on 21 October and the ship arrived in Osaka, Japan on 25 November to be scrapped.

== Postage stamps ==
Dominion Monarch was depicted on two postage stamps. The first was issued in 1946 by New Zealand as part of the "Peace" issue and shows her and HMNZS Achilles on the 5d stamp paying tribute to the Royal New Zealand Navy. The second was issued by Australia in 2004 as part of the "Bon Voyage" series on the 50c stamp and shows a Shaw, Savill and Albion Line poster depicting the ship.

== In popular culture ==
Dominion Monarch features in a photograph in the opening titles of the BBC TV series Call the Midwife. The photo depicts the vessel moored at London's King George V Dock, towering over homes on Saville Street.

== Sources and further reading ==
- Haws, Duncan (1987). Shaw, Savill, & Albion. Merchant Fleets. Vol. 10. Burwash: Travel Creatours Ltd Publications. ISBN 0-946378-06-1.
- Plowman, Peter (2006). "Dominion Monarch". Australian Migrant Ships 1946–1977. Kenthurst, NSW: Rosenberg Publishing. p. 30. ISBN 978-1877058400.
- Slader, John (1988). The Red Duster at War. London: William Kimber & Co Ltd. p. 183. ISBN 0-7183-0679-1.
- Talbot-Booth, E.C. (1942) [1936]. Ships and the Sea (Seventh ed.). London: Sampson Low, Marston & Co. Ltd. pp. 349, 541.
