= Marsha Pelletier =

American politician

Member of New Hampshire House of Representatives for Strafford 20
- In office 2010–2014

Personal details
- Born: July 29, 1950 (age 76)
- Party: Democratic
- Education: Kansas State University

Marsha Pelletier (born July 29, 1950) is an American politician. She represented Strafford 20th district at the New Hampshire House of Representatives from 2010 to 2014. She served a previous term in the 1990s. She is a retired schoolteacher. In 2019, she was a candidate for Dover School Board.
