= Michael Brewster =

Michael Brewster may refer to:

- Mike Brewster (born 1989), American football player
- Michael Brewster (artist) (1946–2016), American artist
- Michael Brewster (politician) (1954–2019), American politician
