= Curtis Grace =

American politician

Member of New Hampshire House of Representatives for Rockingham 11
- In office 2012–2014

Personal details
- Party: Republican
- Education: Southern New Hampshire University

Curtis Grace is an American politician. He represented Rockingham 11th district on the New Hampshire House of Representatives from 2012 to 2014.

Grace is a graduate of Southern New Hampshire University. He ran for office after involvement in the Mitt Romney 2012 presidential campaign.
