= Richard Eaton (American politician) =

American politician

Member of New Hampshire House of Representatives for Hillsborough 38
- In office 2012–2014
- In office 2000–2002

Personal details
- Party: Democratic
- Education: University of New Hampshire

Richard Sutherland Eaton is an American politician. He represented Hillsborough 38th district on the New Hampshire House of Representatives from 2012 to 2014. He previously served from 2000 to 2002.
