= John Sedensky =

American politician

Member of New Hampshire House of Representatives for Rockingham 13
- In office 2008–2014

Personal details
- Born: July 26, 1935 Bridgeport, Connecticut
- Died: December 26, 2020 (aged 85) Hampstead, New Hampshire
- Party: Republican

John B. Sedensky (July 26, 1935 – December 26, 2020) was an American politician. He represented Rockingham 13th district on the New Hampshire House of Representatives from 2012 to 2014. He served in the United States Army during the Korean War.
