= Lenette Peterson =

American politician

Member of New Hampshire House of Representatives for Hillsborough 21
- In office 2010–2014

Personal details
- Born: January 3, 1960 (age 66)
- Party: Republican

Lenette Peterson (born January 3, 1960) is an American politician. She represented Hillsborough 21st district at the New Hampshire House of Representatives from 2010 to 2014.
