= Richard LeVasseur =

American politician

Member of New Hampshire House of Representatives for Hillsborough 37
- In office 2012–2014

Personal details
- Party: Republican

Richard LeVasseur is an American politician. He represented Hillsborough 37th district on the New Hampshire House of Representatives from 2012 to 2014.
