= Eric Palangas =

American politician

Member of New Hampshire House of Representatives for Hillsborough 43
- In office 2012–2014

Member of New Hampshire House of Representatives
- In office 2000–2006

Personal details
- Born: August 12, 1966 Manchester, New Hampshire
- Died: September 5, 2015 (aged 49) Bedford, New Hampshire
- Party: Democratic
- Education: Manchester High School Central

Eric Palangas (August 12, 1966 – September 5, 2015) was an American politician. He represented Hillsborough County on the New Hampshire House of Representatives from 2012 to 2014. He served a previous term from 2000 to 2006. He attended Manchester High School Central. He was a firefighter by profession. On September 5, 2015 he was killed in a car crash in Bedford.
