= John Tholl =

American politician

Member of New Hampshire House of Representatives for Coos 5
- In office 2014–2016
- Succeeded by: Marcia Hammon

Member of New Hampshire House of Representatives for Coös 2
- In office 2010–2012

Member of New Hampshire House of Representatives for Coös 2
- In office 1996–2008

Personal details
- Born: February 27, 1944 (age 82)
- Party: Republican

John E. Tholl Jr. (born February 27, 1944) is an American politician. He represented Coos County on New Hampshire House of Representatives from 2010 to 2016.
