= Skip Reilly =

American politician

Member of New Hampshire House of Representatives for Grafton 9
- In office 2010–2014

Personal details
- Party: Republican

Harold T. "Skip" Reilly is an American politician. He represented Grafton 9th district on the New Hampshire House of Representatives from 2010 to 2014.
