= Todd Smith (American politician) =

American politician

Member of New Hampshire House of Representatives for Merrimack 24
- In office 2008–2014

Personal details
- Party: Republican

Todd P. Smith is an American politician. He represented Merrimack 24th district on the New Hampshire House of Representatives from 2008 to 2014.
