= Timothy Copeland =

American politician

Member of New Hampshire House of Representatives for Rockingham 19
- In office 2010–2014

Personal details
- Party: Republican

Timothy D. Copeland is an American politician. He represented Rockingham 19th district on the New Hampshire House of Representatives from 2010 to 2014. He was member of the Board of Selectmen in Stratham.
