= Kevin Waterhouse =

American politician

Member of New Hampshire House of Representatives for Rockingham 7
- In office 2010–2014

Personal details
- Party: Republican
- Education: Central Connecticut State University

Kevin K. Waterhouse is an American politician. He represented Rockingham 7th district on the New Hampshire House of Representatives from 2012 to 2014.
