= Patrick Culbert =

American politician (1948–2024)

Member of the New Hampshire House of Representatives
- In office 1988–1990 Serving with Michael E. Jones and Norman B. Lawrence
- Constituency: Hillsborough 20th
- In office December 5, 2012 – December 3, 2014 Serving with Lars Christiansen, Bob Haefner, Shawn Jasper, Mary Ann Knowles, Richard Levasseur, Lynne Ober, Russell Ober, Andrew Renzullo, Charlene Takesian and Jordan Ulery
- Constituency: Hillsborough 37th

Personal details
- Born: March 22, 1948 Ware, Massachusetts, U.S.
- Died: October 9, 2024 (aged 76) Pelham, New Hampshire, U.S.
- Party: Republican

Patrick L. Culbert (March 22, 1948 – October 9, 2024) was an American politician from the state of New Hampshire. He served as a Republican member of the New Hampshire House of Representatives, representing the Hillsborough 20th district from 1988 to 1990 and the Hillsborough 37th district from 2012 to 2014.

== Political career ==
Culbert was elected to the New Hampshire House of Representatives for the Hillsborough 37 district in 2012, receiving 6,923 votes. He advanced from the September 11 primary and was re-elected in the general election held on November 6, 2012, with 974 votes. At the beginning of the 2013 legislative session, he served on the Health, Human Services and Elderly Affairs Committee until 2014.

== Death ==
Culbert died in Pelham, New Hampshire on October 9, 2024, at the age of 76.
