= Jane Johnson (politician) =

American politician

Member of New Hampshire House of Representatives for Cheshire 12
- In office 2006–2014

Personal details
- Party: Republican

Jane B. Johnson is an American politician. She represented Cheshire 12th district at the New Hampshire House of Representatives from 2006 to 2014. She is a long-time ally of Governor Kelly Ayotte.
