= Lawrence Perkins (politician) =

American politician

Member of New Hampshire House of Representatives for Rockingham 20
- In office 2008–2014

Personal details
- Party: Republican

Lawrence Perkins is an American politician. He represented Rockingham 20th district on the New Hampshire House of Representatives from 2008 to 2014. He is a firefighter.
