= Richard Burchell =

American politician

Member of New Hampshire House of Representatives for Belknap 5
- In office 2012–2014

Personal details
- Born: October 26, 1943 Haverhill, Massachusetts
- Died: December 17, 2020 (aged 77) Gilmanton, New Hampshire
- Party: Republican

Richard B. Burchell (October 26, 1943 – December 17, 2020) was an American politician. He represented Belknap 5th district on the New Hampshire House of Representatives from 2012 to 2014.
