= James Allard (politician) =

American politician

Member of the New Hampshire House of Representatives from the Merrimack 21st district
- In office December 5, 2018 – December 7, 2022 Serving with John Klose
- Preceded by: Michael Brewster
- Succeeded by: Timothy Soucy

Personal details
- Born: January 7, 1951 (age 75) Concord, New Hampshire, U.S.
- Party: Republican
- Education: University of New Hampshire; Southern New Hampshire University; Boston University

James Allard (born January 7, 1951) is an American politician. He served as a Republican member for the Merrimack 21st district of the New Hampshire House of Representatives.

== Life and career ==
Allard was born in Concord, New Hampshire. He attended the University of New Hampshire for a BA in history, Southern New Hampshire University for a MFA in nonfiction writing and Boston University for a MS in mass communications. He served in the United States Army.

Allard served in the New Hampshire House of Representatives from 2018 to 2022.
