= Kevin St. James =

American politician

Member of New Hampshire House of Representatives for Rockingham 13
- In office 2012–2014

Personal details
- Party: Republican

Kevin P. St. James is an American politician. He represented Rockingham 13th district on the New Hampshire House of Representatives from 2012 to 2014. St. James was a firefighter from Exeter, New Hampshire. He and his wife owned a daycare business. St. James served as a Rockingham County Commissioner and selectman in Kingston, New Hampshire.
