= Charles Fink =

American politician

Member of New Hampshire House of Representatives for Belknap 6
- In office 2012–2014

Personal details
- Party: Republican

Charles R. Fink is an American politician. He represented Belknap 6th district on the New Hampshire House of Representatives from 2012 to 2014.
