= John Klose =

American politician

Member of the New Hampshire House of Representatives from the 21st Merrimack district
- In office December 7, 2016 – December 7, 2022 Serving with Michael Brewster (2016–2018), James Allard (2018–2022)
- Preceded by: Dan McGuire
- Succeeded by: Timothy Soucy

Personal details
- Party: Republican

John F. Klose is an American politician. He was a member of the New Hampshire House of Representatives and represented Merrimack's 21st district.
