= Duane Erickson =

American politician

Member of New Hampshire House of Representatives for Hillsborough 25
- In office 2010–2012

Personal details
- Party: Republican

Duane Erickson is an American politician. He represented Hillsborough 25th district on the New Hampshire House of Representatives from 2010 to 2012. He was a delegate to the 1974 New Hampshire Constitutional Convention. He was a candidate for Hillsborough 34 in 2014.
