= Mary Ann Knowles =

American politician

Member of New Hampshire House of Representatives for Hillsborough 37
- In office 2012–2014

Member of New Hampshire House of Representatives for Hillsborough 26
- In office 2006–2010

Personal details
- Born: Mary Ann Demyan; December 5, 1946 New Brunswick, New Jersey
- Died: February 6, 2017 (aged 70) Merrimack, New Hampshire
- Party: Democratic
- Education: Douglass College of Rutgers University

Mary Ann Knowles (née Demyan; December 5, 1946 – February 6, 2017) is an American politician. She represented Hillsborough County on the New Hampshire House of Representatives until 2014.

Knowles was born in New Brunswick, New Jersey. Raised in Metuchen, New Jersey, she attended St. Peter the Apostle High School in New Brunswick and then Douglass College of Rutgers University. In 1990, she and her husband moved from Somerville, Massachusetts, to Hudson, New Hampshire where she became active in Democratic Party politics. She resided in Nashua. Knowles died on February 6, 2017, from cancer.
