= Larry Enman =

American politician

Member of New Hampshire House of Representatives for Coös 1
- In office 2012–2014

Personal details
- Party: Democratic

Larry S. Enman is an American politician. He represented Coös 1st district on the New Hampshire House of Representatives from 2012 to 2014.
