= Rebecca Emerson-Brown =

American politician

Member of New Hampshire House of Representatives for Rockingham 27
- In office 2012–2014

Personal details
- Party: Democratic
- Education: University of New Hampshire

Rebecca Emerson-Brown is an American politician. She represented Rockingham 27th district at the New Hampshire House of Representatives from 2012 to 2014.
