= Ralph Doolan =

American politician

Member of New Hampshire House of Representatives for Grafton 1
- In office 2012–2014

Personal details
- Born: November 4, 1933 Lancaster, New Hampshire
- Died: March 12, 2018 (aged 84) Candia, New Hampshire
- Party: Republican
- Education: Norwich University; University of New Hampshire

Ralph J. "Buster" Doolan, Jr. (November 4, 1933 – March 12, 2018) was an American politician from the Republican Party. He represented Grafton 1st district on the New Hampshire House of Representatives from 2012 to 2014. He attended Norwich University and the University of New Hampshire. He owned a publishing company with a business journal for the North American forestry industry.
