= Stephen Palmer (politician) =

American politician

Member of New Hampshire House of Representatives for Hillsborough 23
- In office 2008–2014

Personal details
- Born: October 30, 1942
- Party: Republican

Stephen J. Palmer (born October 30, 1942) is an American politician. He represented Hillsborough 23rd district on the New Hampshire House of Representatives from 2008 to 2014.
