= Franklin Bishop =

American politician

Member of New Hampshire House of Representatives for Rockingham 3
- In office 2012–2014

Member of New Hampshire House of Representatives for Rockingham 3
- In office 1994–2010

Personal details
- Born: January 27, 1932 Kingston, New Hampshire
- Died: November 24, 2016 (aged 84) Raymond, New Hampshire
- Party: Republican

Franklin C. Bishop (January 27, 1932 – November 24, 2016) was an American politician. He represented Rockingham County on the New Hampshire House of Representatives until 2014. He served in the United States Air Force during the Korean War.
