= Harry Merrow =

American politician

Member of New Hampshire House of Representatives for Carroll 5
- In office 2010–2014

Personal details
- Born: March 19, 1938 (age 88)
- Party: Republican
- Education: University of New Hampshire

Harry C. Merrow (born March 19, 1938) is an American politician. He represented Carroll 5th district on the New Hampshire House of Representatives from 2010 to 2014.
