= John Cebrowski =

American politician (born 1939)

Member of the New Hampshire House of Representatives from the Hillsborough 7th district

Personal details
- Born: October 15, 1939 (age 86)
- Party: Republican
- Education: Rochester Institute of Technology; Rhode Island School of Design; Kellogg School of Management

Military service
- Branch/service: United States Marine Corps
- Years of service: 1962–1967

John W. Cebrowski (born October 15, 1939) is an American politician from the state of New Hampshire. A Republican, he served in the New Hampshire House of Representatives, representing Hillsborough's 7th district until 2014.

Cebrowski graduated from the Rochester Institute of Technology, Rhode Island School of Design, and Northwestern University's Kellogg School of Management. He served in the United States Marine Corps from 1962 through 1967, and was deployed during the Vietnam War. He worked as a marketing and sales executive for General Electric, Xerox, and U.S. Surgical.
