= James W. Allard =

American philosopher

James Allard

Education
- Education: Princeton University (PhD)

Philosophical work
- Era: 21st-century philosophy
- Region: Western philosophy
- Institutions: Montana State University
- Main interests: continental philosophy

James Allard is an American philosopher and Emeritus Professor of Philosophy at Montana State University. He is known for his works on continental philosophy.

== Books ==
- The Logical Foundations of Bradley’s Metaphysics: Judgment, Inference, and Truth, Cambridge: Cambridge University Press, 2005.
