= Ontario New Democratic Party candidates in the 2007 Ontario provincial election =

This is a list of candidates for the Ontario New Democratic Party in the 2007 Ontario general election.The ONDP ran candidates in all of the province's 107 ridings; 10 of whom were elected.

== Central Ontario ==
Riding	Candidate's Name	Notes	Residence	Occupation	Votes	%	Rank
Barrie	Larry Taylor	Member of Mississauga City Council (1977–1986)			3,700	7.99	3rd
Dufferin—Caledon	Lynda McDougall	ONDP candidate for Dufferin—Peel—Wellington—Grey in the 2005 Dufferin—Peel—Wellington—Grey provincial by-election			3,893	9.86	4th
Durham	Catherine Robinson		Port Perry		5,521	12.05	3rd
Haliburton—Kawartha Lakes—Brock	Joan Corrigan		Lindsay		5,785	11.92	3rd
Newmarket—Aurora	Mike Seaward	President of United Steelworkers Local 8412; ONDP candidate for Vaughan—King—Aurora in the 2003 and 1999 provincial elections		Union leader	3,290	7.22	4th
Northumberland—Quinte West	Carol Blaind				6,492	13.22	3rd
Peterborough	Dave Nickle	ONDP candidate for Peterborough in the 2003, and 1999 provincial elections			8,523	16.62	3rd
Simcoe—Grey	Katy Austin	NDP candidate for Simcoe—Grey in the 2006 federal election		Teacher	4,417	9.22	4th
Simcoe North	Andrew Hill				4,240	9.19	4th
York—Simcoe	Nancy Morrison				4,205	10.14	4th

== Eastern Ontario/Ottawa ==
Riding	Candidate's Name	Notes	Residence	Occupation	Votes	%	Rank
Carleton—Mississippi Mills	Michael Hadskis				4,002	7.62	4th
Glengarry—Prescott—Russell	Josée Blanchette			Social worker	2,281	5.67	4th
Kingston and the Islands	Rick Downes	Member of Kingston City Council (1997–2006)	Kingston	Vice-principal	10,129	20.55	3rd
Lanark—Frontenac—Lennox and Addington	Ross Sutherland	NDP candidate for Lanark—Frontenac—Lennox and Addington in the 2004 federal election ONDP candidate for Hastings—Frontenac—Lennox and Addington in the 2003 provincial election			5,623	12.53	3rd
Leeds—Grenville	Pauline Kuhlman		Brockville	Nurse	2,821	6.87	4th
Nepean—Carleton	Tristan Maack				4,000	7.43	4th
Ottawa Centre	Will Murray		Ottawa	Lawyer	16,161	30.90	2nd
Ottawa—Orléans	Andrée Germain				3,088	6.36	3rd
Ottawa South	Edelweiss D'Andrea				4,467	9.33	3rd
Ottawa Vanier	Ric Dagenais	NDP candidate for Ottawa—Vanier in the 2006 and 2004 federal elections ONDP candidate for Ottawa—Orléans in the 2003 provincial election			6,049	14.71	3rd
Ottawa West—Nepean	Lynn Hamilton			Social worker	4,564	9.69	3rd
Prince Edward—Hastings	Jodie Jenkins	ONDP candidate for Prince Edward—Hastings in the 2003 provincial election			6,287	13.90	3rd
Renfrew—Nipissing—Pembroke	Felictie Stairs	ONDP candidate for Renfrew—Nipissing—Pembroke in the 2003 provincial election			3,038	7.58	3rd
Stormont—Dundas—South Glengarry	Lori Taylor				2,813	7.37	3rd

== Greater Toronto Area ==
Riding	Candidate's Name	Notes	Residence	Occupation	Votes	%	Rank
Ajax—Pickering	Bala Thavarajasoorier		Ajax	Therapist	3,275	8.09	3rd
Beaches—East York	Michael Prue	Member of Provincial Parliament for Beaches—East York (2001–2014); Candidate in the 2009 Ontario NDP leadership election Member of Toronto City Council for Ward 32 (Beaches—East York) (1998–2001); Mayor of East York (1993–1997)		Civil servant	17,522	44.32	1st
Bramalea—Gore—Malton	Glenn Crowe		Bramalea	HVAC professional	5,016	12.34	3rd
Brampton—Springdale	Mani Singh		Brampton	Real estate agent	3,800	10.89	3rd
Brampton West	Garth Bobb	ONDP candidate for York West in the 2003 provincial election	Etobicoke	Executive assistant	4,901	10.91	3rd
Burlington	Cory Judson	ONDP candidate for the 2007 Burlington provincial by-election	Burlington	Teacher	5,728	10.97	3rd
Davenport	Peter Ferreira	President of the Portuguese Canadian National Congress (–2006); Dufferin-Peel Catholic District School Board Trustee			10,880	36.49	2nd
Don Valley East	Mary Trapani Hynes				3,759	10.63	3rd
Don Valley West	Mike Kenny				2,138	4.67	4th
Eglinton—Lawrence	Karin Wiens				4,039	10.03	3rd
Etobicoke Centre	Anita Agrawal			Small business owner	3,847	8.40	3rd
Etobicoke—Lakeshore	Andrea Németh				5,837	13.28	3rd
Etobicoke North	Mohamed Boudjenane	Executive Director of the Canadian Arab Federation		Journalist	4,101	14.85	3rd
Halton	Patricia Heroux	President of OPSEU Local 261		Seniors' care aide	4,160	7.68	4th
Markham—Unionville	Andy Arifin			University student	2,597	7.30	3rd
Mississauga—Brampton South	Karan Pandher		Brampton	Postal worker	3,785	10.31	4th
Mississauga East—Cooksville	Sathish Balasunderam				3,192	8.46	3rd
Mississauga—Erindale	Shaila Kibria			Event planner	5,056	11.23	3rd
Mississauga South	Ken Cole	ONDP candidate for Mississauga South in the 2003 provincial election			3,745	9.11	3rd
Mississauga—Streetsville	Gail McCabe	ONDP candidate for Mississauga Centre in the 1999 provincial election			3,944	10.23	3rd
Oak Ridges—Markham	Janice Hagan	ONDP candidate for Markham in the 2003 and 1999 provincial elections			4,698	7.93	3rd
Oakville	Tony Crawford				3,091	6.48	4th
Oshawa	Sid Ryan	President of CUPE Ontario (1992–2009)		Union leader	13,482	32.92	2nd
Parkdale—High Park	Cheri DiNovo	Member of Provincial Parliament for Parkdale—High Park (2006–2017)	Toronto	United Church minister	18,194	44.71	1st
Pickering—Scarborough East	Andrea Moffat				4,563	11.23	3rd
Richmond Hill	Nella Cotrupi				3,565	8.76	3rd
Scarborough—Agincourt	Yvette Blackburn				3,531	7.31	3rd
Scarborough Centre	Kathleen Mathurin				4,401	13.29	3rd
Scarborough—Guildwood	Neethan Shan	York Region District School Board Trustee for Wards 7 and 8 (2006–2010)	Scarborough	Social worker	7,441	21.92	3rd
Scarborough—Rouge River	Sheila White				4,691	13.68	3rd
Scarborough Southwest	Jay Sarkar				5,930	18.11	3rd
St. Paul's	Julian Heller	ONDP candidate for St. Paul's in the 2003 provincial election			7,061	15.74	3rd
Thornhill	Sandra Parrott				2,867	5.92	3rd
Toronto Centre	Sandra Gonzalez				8,464	18.82	3rd
Toronto—Danforth	Peter Tabuns	Member of Provincial Parliament for Toronto—Danforth (2006–present); Member of Toronto City Council for Ward 8-Riverdale (1990–1997)	Toronto	Executive director of Greenpeace Canada (1999–2004)	17,975	45.85	1st
Trinity—Spadina	Rosario Marchese	Member of Provincial Parliament for Trinity—Spadina (1999–2014); Member of Provincial Parliament for Fort York (1990–1999)		Teacher	18,508	41.15	1st
Vaughan	Rick Morelli	Metropolitan Separate School Board Trustee for Downsview (1988–?)	Woodbridge	Pharmacy manager	5,470	11.69	3rd
Whitby—Oshawa	Nigel Moses				5,733	11.12	3rd
Willowdale	Rini Ghosh				3,699	8.34	3rd
York Centre	Claudia Rodriguez				3,713	10.87	3rd
York South—Weston	Paul Ferreira	Member of Provincial Parliament for York South—Weston (2007)			13,394	41.54	2nd
York West	Antoni Shelton			Union official (CUPE)	6,764	27.95	2nd

== Hamilton/Niagara ==
Riding	Candidate's Name	Notes	Residence	Occupation	Votes	%	Rank
Ancaster—Dundas—Flamborough—Westdale	Juanita Maldonado				6,814	13.72	3rd
Hamilton Centre	Andrea Horwath	Member of Provincial Parliament for Hamilton East (2004–2007); Member of Hamilton City Council for Ward 2 (1997–2004)	Hamilton		17,176	44.72	1st
Hamilton East—Stoney Creek	Paul Miller	Member of Stoney Creek City Council (1994–2000)	Stoney Creek		16,272	37.65	1st
Hamilton Mountain	Bryan Adamczyk				15,653	33.53	2nd
Niagara Falls	Mike Piché				4,605	9.85	4th
Niagara West—Glanbrook	Bonnie Bryan				5,809	12.20	3rd
St. Catharines	Henry Bosch			Paramedic	7,069	15.88	3rd
Welland	Peter Kormos	Member of Provincial Parliament for Niagara Centre (1999–2007); Member of Provincial Parliament for Welland–Thorold (1988–1999)		Lawyer	24,910	53.94	1st

== Northern Ontario ==
Riding	Candidate's Name	Notes	Residence	Occupation	Votes	%	Rank
Algoma—Manitoulin	Peter Denley	ONDP candidate for Algoma—Manitoulin in the 2003 provincial election	Algoma District	Journalist/Union official (CUPW)	9,863	36.95	2nd
Kenora—Rainy River	Howard Hampton	Member of Provincial Parliament for Kenora—Rainy River (1999–2011); Leader of the Ontario New Democratic Party (1996–2009); Member of Provincial Parliament for Rainy River (1987–1999)		Lawyer	14,281	60.62	1st
Nickel Belt	France Gélinas		Naughton	Physiotherapist	15,126	46.59	1st
Nipissing	Henri Giroux			Chef	4,136	12.64	3rd
Parry Sound—Muskoka	Sara Hall		Minett	Art gallery worker	5,015	13.65	3rd
Sault Ste. Marie	Jeff Arbus	President of OPSEU Local 613	Sault Ste. Marie	Professor at Sault College	8,475	26.38	2nd
Sudbury	Dave Battaino		Sudbury	Family counsellor/professor at Cambrian College	8,914	27.13	2nd
Thunder Bay—Atikokan	John Rafferty	Member of Parliament for Thunder Bay—Rainy River (2008–2015)			10,878	37.52	2nd
Thunder Bay—Superior North	Jim Foulds	Member of Provincial Parliament for Port Arthur (1971–1987)		Teacher	10,938	38.26	2nd
Timiskaming—Cochrane	John Vanthof		Earlton	Farmer	10,954	40.55	2nd
Timmins—James Bay	Gilles Bisson	Member of Provincial Parliament for Timmins—James Bay (1999–2018); Member of Provincial Parliament for Cochrane South (1990–1999)	Timmins	Union leader	13,176	51.60	1st

== Southwestern Ontario ==
Riding	Candidate's Name	Notes	Residence	Occupation	Votes	%	Rank
Brant	Brian Van Tilborg		Brantford		6,536	13.68	3rd
Bruce—Grey—Owen Sound	Paul Johnstone				1,721	3.79	4th
Cambridge	Mitchell Healey				5,896	13.70	3rd
Elgin—Middlesex—London	Brad James	Son of Ken James			4,643	11.46	3rd
Essex	John Grima			Union leader (CUPE)	8,638	20.77	3rd
Guelph	Karan Mann-Bowers				6,880	13.84	4th
Haldimand—Norfolk	Jan Watson		Caledonia	Account manager	4,546	10.60	3rd
Huron—Bruce	Paul Klopp	Member of Provincial Parliament for Huron (1990–1995)	Bluewater	Farmer	5,932	13.32	3rd
Kitchener Centre	Rick Moffitt			Teacher	6,707	17.61	3rd
Kitchener—Conestoga	Mark Cairns		Kitchener	IT professional	4,545	11.65	3rd
Kitchener—Waterloo	Catherine Fife	Waterloo Region District School Board Trustee for Waterloo/Wilmot (2003–2012)	Waterloo	Researcher	8,902	17.52	3rd
Lambton—Kent—Middlesex	Joyce Joliffe	ONDP candidate for Lambton—Kent—Middlesex in the 2003 provincial election NDP candidate for Lambton—Kent—Middlesex in the 2000 federal election	Strathroy	Factory worker/Union leader (United Steelworkers)	4,520	10.73	3rd
London—Fanshawe	Stephen Maynard				9,350	16.65	3rd
London North Centre	Steve Holmes				7,649	16.65	3rd
London West	Paul Pighin		London		5,562	11.23	3rd
Oxford	Michael Comeau				4,421	11.33	3rd
Perth—Wellington	Donna Hansen				3,912	10.09	3rd
Sarnia—Lambton	Barb Millitt				11,349	26.82	3rd
Wellington—Halton Hills	Noel Duignan	Member of Provincial Parliament for Halton North (1990–1995)	Georgetown	Executive assistant	3,914	8.94	4th
Windsor—Tecumseh	Helmi Charif				8,836	24.36	2nd
Windsor West	Mariano Klimowicz		Windsor	Laboratory technician	8,604	25.67	2nd
