= Peter Sullivan (politician) =

American politician

Peter M. Sullivan

Member of the New Hampshire House of Representatives from the Hillsborough 10th district
- In office 2001-2006, 2012-2014
- Preceded by: Michael Brunelle
- Succeeded by: Patrick Long

Manchester Alderman
- In office 2008–2010
- Preceded by: Patrick Long
- Succeeded by: Patrick Long
- Constituency: Ward 3

Personal details
- Born: April 13, 1967 (age 59) Virginia
- Party: Democratic
- Spouse: Katya W. Sullivan
- Education: University of New Orleans; University of Arkansas School of Law
- Profession: Attorney

Military service
- Branch/service: United States Army

Peter M. Sullivan is a Democratic former member of the New Hampshire House of Representatives and a former member of the Board of Aldermen in the city of Manchester, New Hampshire. He served as a New Hampshire state representative from Hillsborough County, from 2001 until 2006, during which he served on the House Committees on Criminal Justice and Public Safety and State-Federal Relations and Veterans Affairs. From 2008 to 2010, Sullivan served as a member of the Manchester Board of Aldermen from the city's downtown Ward 3. He served in the New Hampshire House again from 2012 through 2014.

== Early life and career ==
Born in Virginia, Sullivan is a graduate of the University of New Orleans and the University of Arkansas School of Law. He served for ten years as a member of the United States Army Reserve and the Army National Guard, including five years of service as a commissioned officer. He has been married to his wife Katya since 1995.

Sullivan won a seat on Manchester's Board of Aldermen on November 6, 2007. He defeated incumbent Pat Long, a fellow Democrat, in the non-partisan municipal election. He was the only candidate to defeat a sitting member of the Board in 2007.

In February, 2012, Sullivan returned to the New Hampshire House following his election in a special election. He was re-elected in the November 2012 general election.
