= Michael Brewster (politician) =

American politician

Member of New Hampshire House of Representatives for Merrimack 21
- In office December 3, 2014 – December 4, 2018
- Succeeded by: James Allard

Personal details
- Born: March 11, 1954 Concord, New Hampshire
- Died: December 2, 2019 (aged 65) Pittsfield, New Hampshire
- Party: Republican

Michael Brewster (March 11, 1954 – December 2, 2019) was an American politician. He was a member of the New Hampshire House of Representatives and represented Merrimack 21st district from 2014 to 2018.
