= Inman Township =

Inman Township may refer to one of the following places in the United States:

- Inman Township, Otter Tail County, Minnesota
- Inman Township, Holt County, Nebraska
