= Eileen Flockhart =

American politician (born 1944)

Member of the New Hampshire House of Representatives from the Rockingham 13th district
- In office 2004–2014

Personal details
- Born: June 17, 1944 (age 82) Port Washington, New York
- Party: Democratic
- Spouse: Douglas
- Profession: Educator

Eileen C. Flockhart is a Democratic former member of the New Hampshire House of Representatives who represented the Rockingham 13th District from 2004 through 2014.

== Education ==
Flockhart received her B.A. from The Catholic University of America in 1966.

== Political experience ==
Flockhart has had the following political experience:

- Candidate, New Hampshire House of Representatives, District Rockingham 18, 2012
- Representative, New Hampshire State House of Representatives, 2004-2014
- Member, New Hampshire Democratic Party, 1982–present
- Candidate, New Hampshire State House of Representatives, Rockingham 83, 2002
- Member, Rockingham County Democratic Party, 1992
- Member, Exeter, Democratic Party, 1982

== Caucuses/non-legislative committees ==
- Member, Legislative Caucus for Young Children, 2004
- Member, Task Force on Deaf and Hard of Hearing, 2004
- Board Member, Dover Schools Professional Development Committee, 1997-2004
- Board Member, Exeter 350th Committee, 1986-1988
