= Angeline Kopka =

American politician (1916–2016)

Member of the New Hampshire House of Representatives
- In office 2002–2010, 2012–2014

Personal details
- Born: April 18, 1916 Nashua, New Hampshire, U.S.
- Died: October 28, 2016 (aged 100) Nashua, New Hampshire, U.S.
- Party: Democratic
- Spouse(s): John S. Kopka (m. ca. 1935 – 2009; his death)
- Children: 2
- Profession: Real estate

Angeline A. Kopka (née Landry; April 18, 1916 – October 28, 2016) was an American realtor and member of the New Hampshire House of Representatives. She was of French and Irish descent.

== Biography ==
Kopka graduated from Nashua Business College, earning an associate degree. A former real estate agent, she founded Kopka Real Estate, in her hometown of Nashua, New Hampshire, in 1953.

In 1974, she served as president of the National Women's Council of Realtors, and later, the New Hampshire Association of Realtors the following year. She is a winner of the National Association of Realtors Distinguished Service Award, receiving the award in 1991.

Kopka was elected to the New Hampshire House of Representatives in 2002 as a Democratic Party, and served until 2010 when she was defeated for re-election. She won re-election in 2012, becoming the oldest lawmaker in the United States.

Kopka married to John S. Kopka Jr., around 1935; they remained wed until his death in 2009. She had two children, seven grandchildren and three great-grandchildren. She turned 100 in April 2016 and died October 28, 2016.
