= Sid Lovett =

American politician

Member of the New Hampshire House of Representatives from the Grafton 8th district
- In office 1994-1998, 2000-2002, 2006-2008, 2012-2014
- Succeeded by: Travis Bennett

Personal details
- Born: May 1, 1928 Boston, Massachusetts, U.S.
- Died: October 5, 2021 (aged 93) Holderness, New Hampshire, U.S.
- Party: Democratic
- Education: Yale College, Union Theological Seminary
- Profession: Minister

Sidney Lovett (May 1, 1928 – October 5, 2021) was an American politician who served as a Democratic member of the New Hampshire House of Representatives, representing the Grafton 8th District from 1994–1998, 2000-2002, 2006–2008 and 2012-2014.
