= Jack Hayes (American politician) =

American politician

Member of New Hampshire House of Representatives for Rockingham 14
- In office 2012–2014

Personal details
- Party: Republican

Jack Hayes is an American politician. He represented Rockingham 14th district on the New Hampshire House of Representatives from 2012 to 2014.
