= Timothy Twombly =

American politician

Member of New Hampshire House of Representatives for Hillsborough 34
- In office 2014–2018

Member of New Hampshire House of Representatives for Hillsborough 25
- In office 2010–2012

Personal details
- Party: Republican
- Education: University of Maine; University of Southern Maine

Timothy Twombly is an American politician. He was a member of the New Hampshire House of Representatives.
