= Sally Kelly =

American politician

Sara 'Sally' Kelly

Member of the New Hampshire House of Representatives from the Merrimack 7th district
- In office 2006–2014

Personal details
- Born: Peabody, Massachusetts
- Party: Democratic
- Spouse: Douglas Kelly
- Education: UMass Amherst

Sara "Sally" Kelly is a Democratic former member of the New Hampshire House of Representatives, representing the Merrimack 7th District from 2006 through 2014.
