= HMS Inman =

Frigate of the Royal Navy

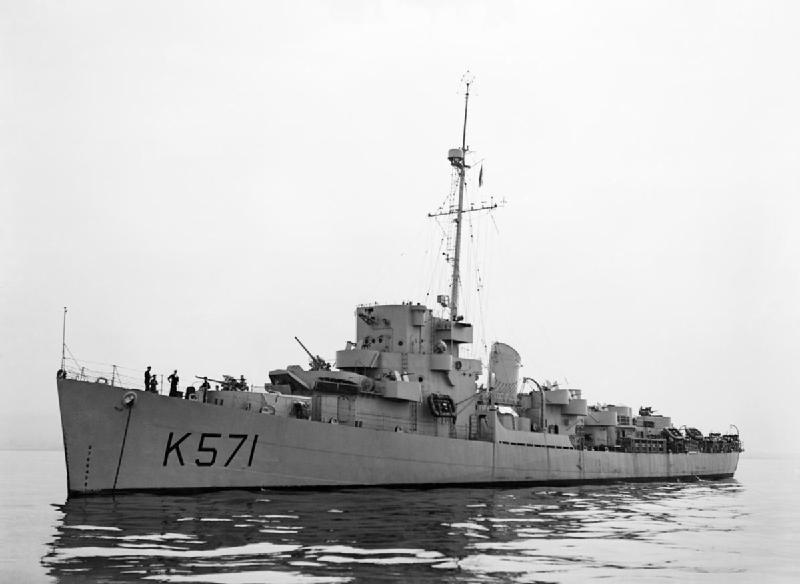
- HMS Inman off Greenock, Scotland, on 22 May 1944

History

United States
- Name: unnamed (DE-526)
- Builder: Boston Navy Yard, Boston, Massachusetts
- Laid down: 25 September 1943
- Launched: 2 November 1943
- Completed: 13 January 1944
- Commissioned: never
- Fate: Transferred to United Kingdom, 13 January 1944
- Acquired: Returned by United Kingdom, 1 March 1946
- Fate: Sold for scrap, November 1946

United Kingdom
- Name: Inman
- Namesake: Captain Henry Inman (1762–1809), British naval officer
- Acquired: 13 January 1944
- Commissioned: 13 January 1944
- Decommissioned: By October 1945
- Identification: Pennant number: K571
- Fate: Returned to United States, 1 March 1946

General characteristics
- Class & type: Captain-class frigate
- Displacement: 1,190 long tons (1,210 t) (standard)
- Length: 289 ft 5 in (88.2 m)
- Beam: 35 ft 2 in (10.7 m)
- Draught: 10 ft 1 in (3.1 m)
- Installed power: 6,000 shp (4,500 kW) electric motors
- Propulsion: 2 shafts; 4 diesel engines
- Speed: 20 knots (37 km/h; 23 mph)
- Range: 6,000 nmi (11,000 km; 6,900 mi) at 12 knots (22 km/h; 14 mph)
- Complement: 198
- Sensors & processing systems: SA & SL type radars; Type 144 series Asdic; MF Direction Finding; HF Direction Finding
- Armament: 3 × single 3 in (76 mm)/50 Mk 22 guns; 1 × twin Bofors 40 mm; 9 × single 20 mm Oerlikon guns; 1 × Hedgehog anti-submarine mortar; 2 × Depth charge rails and four throwers

HMS Inman (K571) was a Captain-class frigate of the Royal Navy in commission in World War II. Originally built as the United States Navy Evarts-class destroyer escort DE-526, she served in the Royal Navy from 1944 to 1945.

== Description ==
The Evarts-class ships had an overall length of 289 feet 5 inches (88.2 m), a beam of 35 feet 2 inches (10.7 m), and a draught of 10 feet 1 inch (3.1 m) at full load. They displaced 1,190 long tons (1,210 t) at (standard) and 1,416 long tons (1,439 t) at full load. The ships had a diesel–electric powertrain derived from a submarine propulsion system with four General Motors 16-cylinder diesel engines providing power to four General Electric electric generators which sent electricity to four 1,500-shaft-horsepower (1,100 kW) General Electric electric motors which drove the two propeller shafts. The destroyer escorts had enough power give them a speed of 20 knots (37 km/h; 23 mph) and enough fuel oil to give them a range of 6,000 nautical miles (11,000 km; 6,900 mi) at 12 knots (22 km/h; 14 mph). Their crew consisted of 198 officers and ratings.

The armament of the Evarts-class ships in British service consisted of three single mounts for 50-caliber 3-inch (76 mm)/50 Mk 22 dual-purpose guns; one superfiring pair forward of the bridge and the third gun aft of the superstructure. Anti-aircraft defence was intended to consisted of a twin-gun mount for 40-millimetre (1.6 in) Bofors anti-aircraft (AA) guns atop the rear superstructure with nine 20-millimetre (0.8 in) Oerlikon AA guns located on the superstructure, but production shortages meant that that not all guns were fitted, or that additional Oerlikons replaced the Bofors guns. A Mark 10 Hedgehog anti-submarine mortar was positioned just behind the forward gun. The ships were also equipped with two depth charge rails at the stern and four "K-gun" depth charge throwers.

== Construction and career ==
The ship was laid down as the unnamed US Navy destroyer escort DE-526 by the Boston Navy Yard in Boston, Massachusetts, on 25 September 1943 and launched on 2 November 1943. The United States transferred her to the United Kingdom under Lend-Lease on 13 January 1944. The ship was commissioned into service in the Royal Navy as HMS Inman (K571) on 13 January 1944 simultaneously with her transfer. She served on patrol and escort duty for the remainder of World War II and was decommissioned by October 1945 after the conclusion of the war.

The Royal Navy returned Inman to the US Navy on 1 March 1946 and the ship was sold for scrap in November 1946 to George H. Nutman, Inc..
