= Timothy Soucy =

American politician

Member of the New Hampshire House of Representatives from the Hillsborough 25th district
- In office 2008–2010

Member of the New Hampshire House of Representatives from the Hillsborough 34th district
- In office 2012–2016

Member of the New Hampshire House of Representatives from the Merrimack 16th district
- In office 2016 – December 7, 2022

Member of the New Hampshire House of Representatives from the Merrimack 21st district
- Incumbent
- Assumed office December 7, 2022
- Preceded by: John Klose

Personal details
- Party: Democratic

Timothy Soucy is an American politician. He serves as a Democratic member for the Merrimack 21st district of the New Hampshire House of Representatives.
