= New Hampshire Democratic Party =

New Hampshire affiliate of the Democratic Party

- Chairperson: Raymond Buckley
- Senate Leader: Rebecca Perkins Kwoka
- House Leader: Alexis Simpson
- Headquarters: Concord, New Hampshire
- Membership (2024): ▼262,262
- National affiliation: Democratic Party
- Colors: Blue
- U.S. Senate seats: 2 / 2
- U.S. House seats: 2 / 2
- Statewide elected executive office: 0 / 1
- Executive Council: 1 / 5
- State Senate: 8 / 24
- State House: 178 / 400

Election symbol

Website
- www.nhdp.org

The New Hampshire Democratic Party (NHDP) is the affiliate of the Democratic Party in the U.S. state of New Hampshire. Its chair is Raymond Buckley, and its vice chairs are Maura Sullivan and Donovan Fenton. The most recent Democratic governor was Maggie Hassan, who served from 2013 to 2017.

The only U.S. president from New Hampshire was a Democrat, Franklin Pierce, who served from 1853 to 1857. It is one of two major parties in the state, with all of New Hampshire's members of Congress being Democrats.

The party has played a pivotal role in the election process for the president of the United States, with New Hampshire holding the first primary in the nation.

== Current elected officials ==
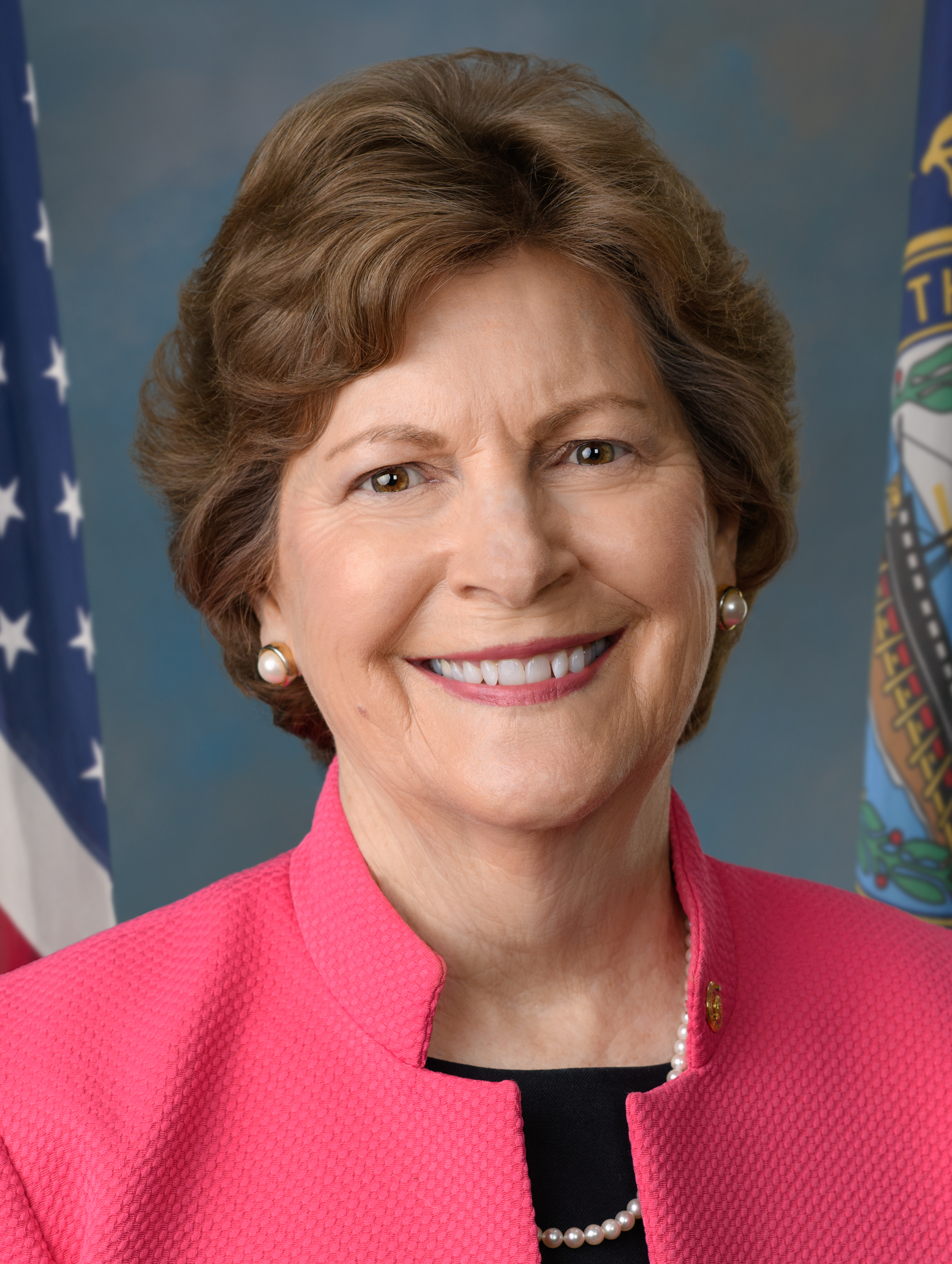
Senior Senator Shaheen

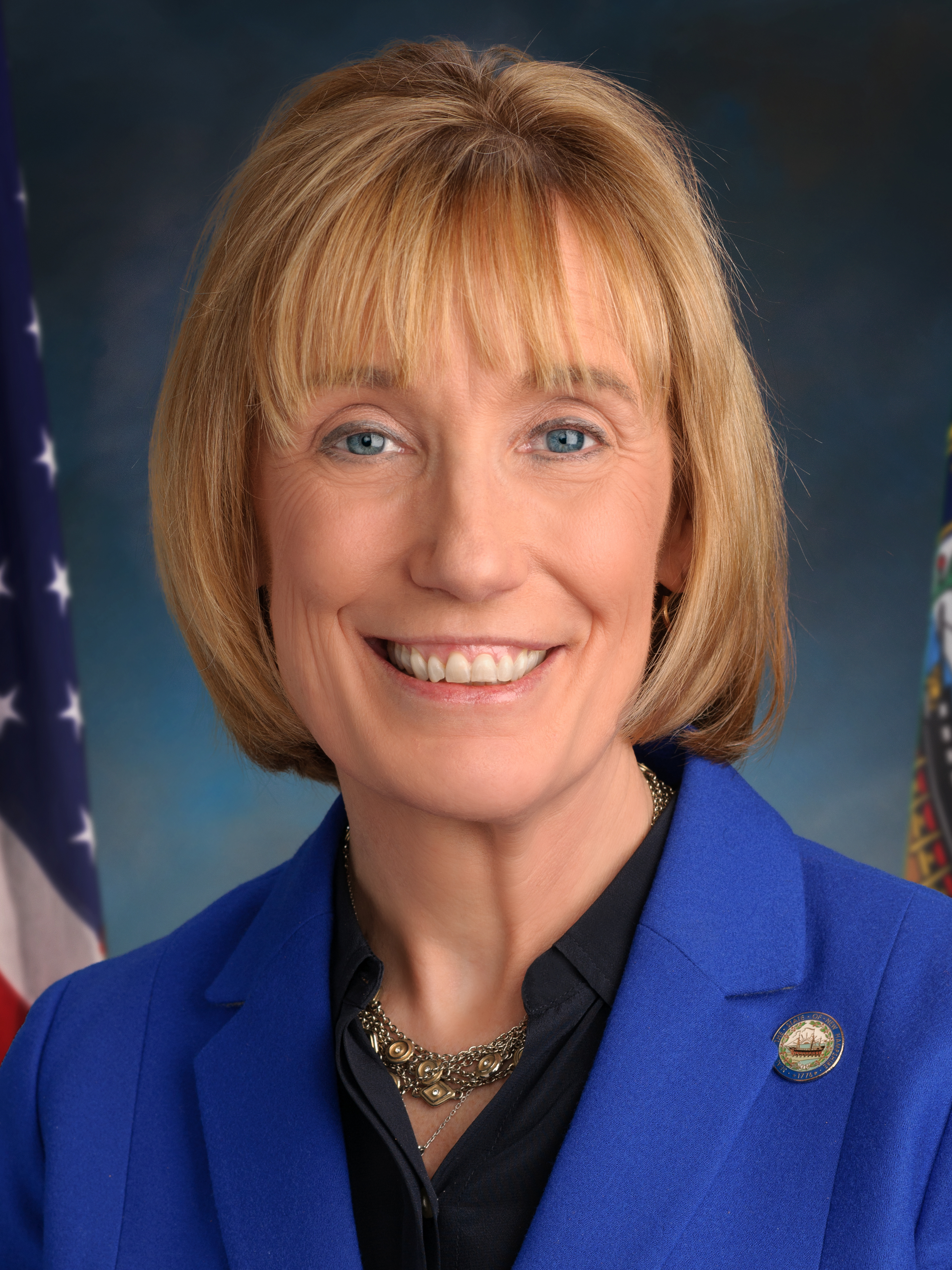
Junior (pre-Senior) Senator Hassan

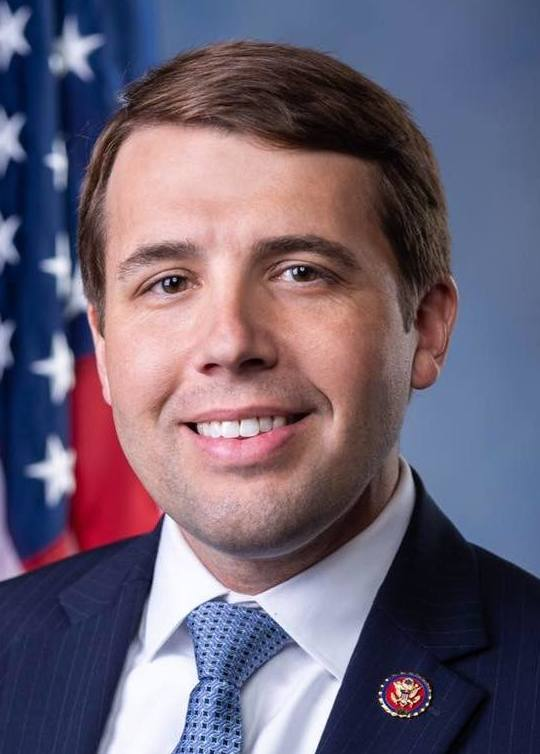
Pre-junior Senator-elect Pappas

The New Hampshire Democratic Party holds both of the state's U.S. Senate seats, and both of the state's seats in the U.S. House of Representatives. Democrats hold a minority in the New Hampshire House of Representatives and New Hampshire Senate.

=== Members of Congress ===
==== U.S. Senate ====
- Class II: Jeanne Shaheen → Chris Pappas (elect)
- Class III: Maggie Hassan

Jeanne Shaheen was the first woman in United States history to be elected to both a governorship and a U.S. senator. She served for three terms as New Hampshire's governor between 1997 and 2003. In 2008 she became the first woman elected to the U.S. Senate from New Hampshire. Senator Shaheen is on the Committee on Appropriations, where she sits as ranking member of the Subcommittee on Commerce, Justice, Science, and Related Agencies. Senator Shaheen is also a member of the Armed Services Committee, Committee on Foreign Relations, Committee on Small Business and Entrepreneurship, Select Committee on Ethics, and Commission on Security and Cooperation in Europe.

Maggie Hassan was the second woman in United States history to be elected to both a governorship and a U.S. senator. Senator Hassan served for two terms from 2013 to 2017 as New Hampshire's 81st governor. Senator Hassan won her election to the U.S. Senate in 2016, beating out incumbent Senator Kelly Ayotte by a mere 1,017 votes. Senator Hassan sits on the Senate Committee on Finance, Committee on Health, Education, Labor, and Pensions, Committee on Homeland Security and Governmental Affairs, and the Joint Economic Committee. Prior to being governor, Senator Hassan was a state senator from District 23 from 2004 to 2010, in which she served as Majority Leader from 2005 to 2010.

==== U.S. House of Representatives ====
District	Member	Photo
1st	Chris Pappas	
1st	Stefany Shaheen (elect)	
2nd	Maggie Goodlander	

Chris Pappas was elected to his first term as a member of Congress in 2018, where he serves on the House Committee on Transportation and Infrastructure as well as the Committee on Veterans' Affairs. Congressman Pappas is the first member of the LGBTQ community to be elected to federal office from the state of New Hampshire. Prior to serving in Congress, Pappas was a member of the New Hampshire Executive Council, representing district 4 from 2013 to 2019.

Maggie Goodlander was elected to a historic first term in 2024.

=== Executive Council ===
- District 2 – Karen Liot Hill – 2025–present

=== Legislative ===
- Senate Leader: Rebecca Perkins Kwoka
- House Leader: Alexis Simpson

=== Mayors ===
- Nashua: Jim Donchess
- Keene: Jay Kahn

== Party platform ==
According to the 2020 New Hampshire Democratic Party Platform:

"New Hampshire Democrats envision a state where individuals, families and businesses can thrive. Our beliefs, commitment and policies are grounded in our democratic values of fairness, justice, integrity, freedom, dignity and compassion. We advocate for policies that support strong, healthy and resilient communities and families, and a strong economy with opportunities for all. We believe that honest transparent government promotes a free, democratic society, one that plays a vital role in creating healthy communities with a strong safety net and a vibrant business environment. We believe that essential elements of a robust economy include a healthy, well-educated, well-trained, and fairly-compensated workforce, quality public education, affordable housing and a comprehensive transportation and communication infrastructure."

== New Hampshire presidential primary ==
New Hampshire holds the first primary in the nation to kick off an election cycle every four years. This is a part of the long process in choosing nominations for both the Democratic and Republican parties. New Hampshire plays a key role in choosing nominees due to the amount of media attention it gets. Being first involves having an impact on the process as a whole by setting the bar for subsequent states.

New Hampshire has been a bellwether for politicians seeking election. A weak showing in New Hampshire has caused office seekers to drop out of the race early. In 1952 and in 1968 Harry Truman and Lyndon Johnson both dropped their reelection campaigns after poor showings in the New Hampshire primary.

New Hampshire started holding a primary in 1916 and has held the First in the Nation primary since 1920. At first voters could only vote on delegates to send the party national conventions. It was Richard F. Upton, speaker of the New Hampshire House of Representatives, who amended the law to allow for direct vote of presidential candidates. In 1952 New Hampshire voters started voting for the candidates.

This new law inspired the voters of New Hampshire to write-in Dwight D. Eisenhower's name as a candidate for the 1952 Republican New Hampshire primary ballot. Eisenhower was able to beat Republican Party leader Robert A. Taft without Eisenhower even going to the state. He would go on to win the nomination and become president.

=== Presidential primary winners ===
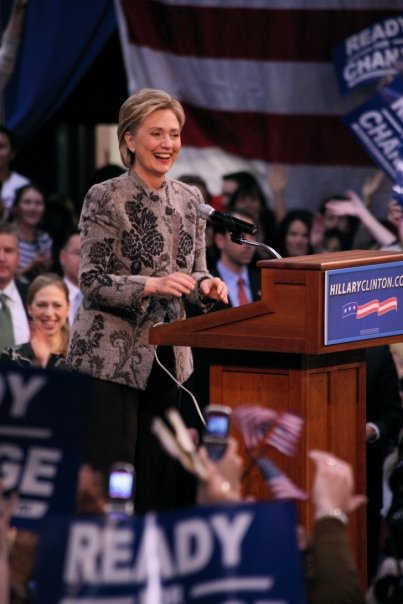
Hillary Clinton after winning the 2008 New Hampshire Primary

- 2024: Joe Biden (Write-in) (Note: Biden did not part-take in primary due to New Hampshire holding its primary out of order to the national Democratic Party's primary order. Biden's supporters organized a write-in campaign.)
- 2020: Bernie Sanders
- 2016: Bernie Sanders
- 2012: Barack Obama
- 2008: Hillary Clinton
- 2004: John Kerry
- 2000: Al Gore
- 1996: Bill Clinton
- 1992: Paul Tsongas
- 1988: Michael Dukakis
- 1984: Gary Hart
- 1980: Jimmy Carter
- 1976: Jimmy Carter
- 1972: Edmund Muskie
- 1968: Lyndon B. Johnson
- 1964: Lyndon B. Johnson
- 1960: John F. Kennedy
- 1956: Estes Kefauver
- 1952: Estes Kefauver

== Past elected officials ==
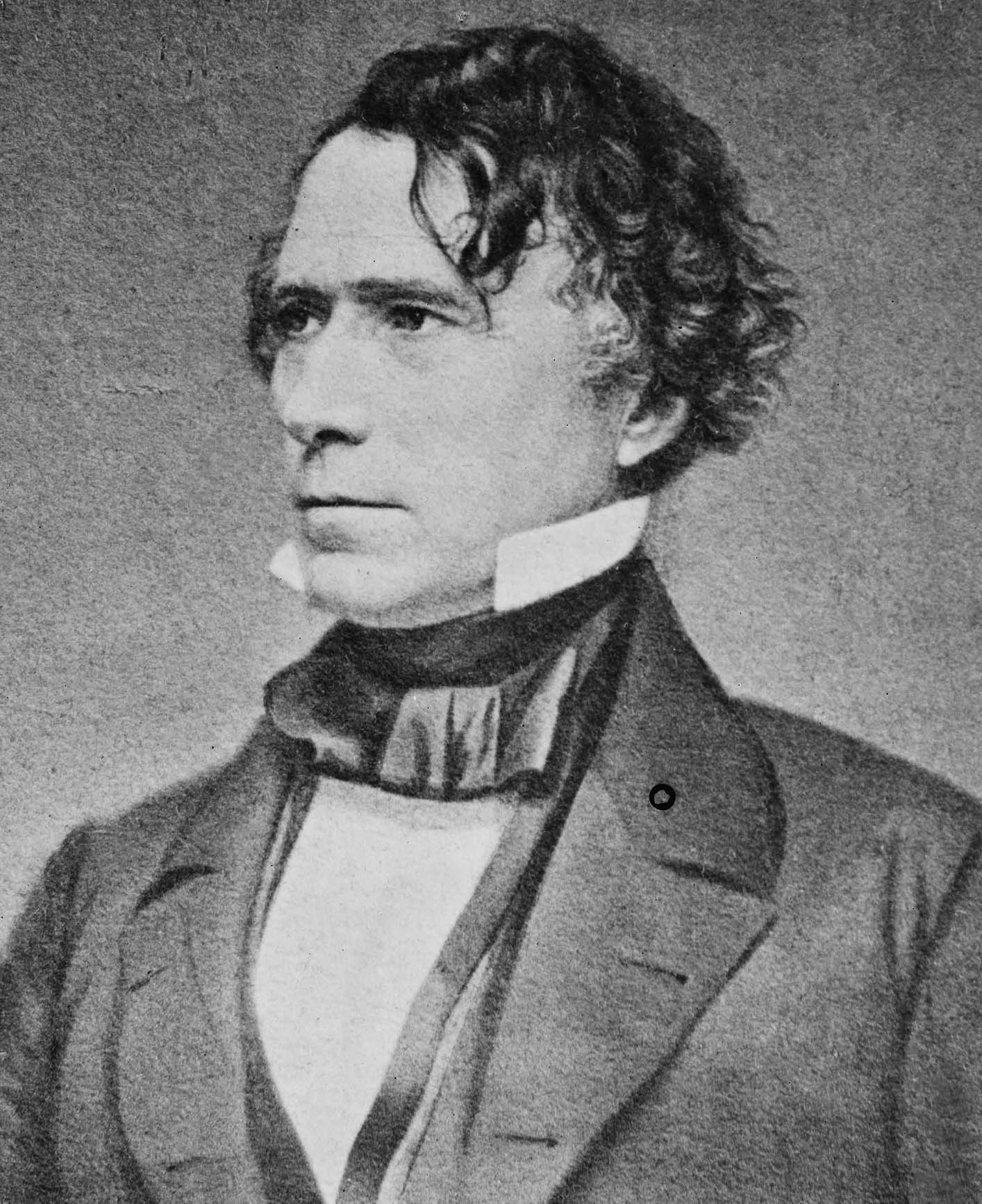
President Franklin Pierce (1853–1857)

=== Governor ===
In chronological order:

- Benjamin Pierce (served 1829–1830)
- Matthew Harvey (1830–1831)
- Joseph M. Harper (1831)
- Samuel Dinsmoor (1831–1834)
- William Badger (1834–1836)
- Isaac Hill (1836–1839)
- John Page (1839–1842)
- Henry Hubbard (1842–1844)
- John Hardy Steele (1844–1846)
- Jared W. Williams (1847–1849)
- Samuel Dinsmoor, Jr. (1849–1852)
- Noah Martin (1852–1854)
- Nathaniel B. Baker (1854–1855)
- James A. Weston (1871–1872; 1874–1875)
- Samuel D. Felker (1913–1915)
- Fred H. Brown (1923–1925)
- John W. King (1963–1969)
- Hugh Gallen (1979–1982)
- Jeanne Shaheen (1997–2003)
- John Lynch (2005–2013)
- Maggie Hassan (2013–2017)

=== U.S. Senate ===
In chronological order:

- Levi Woodbury (served 1825–1831; 1841–1845) Democrat-Republican prior to 1828
- Isaac Hill (served 1831–1836)
- Henry Hubbard (served 1835–1841)
- John Page (1836–1837)
- Franklin Pierce (1837–1842)
- Leonard Wilcox (1841–1843)
- Charles G. Atherton (1843–1849; 1853)
- Benning W. Jenness (1845–1846)
- Jared W. Williams (1853–1854)
- Henry F. Hollis (1913–1919)
- Fred H. Brown (1933–1939)
- Thomas J. McIntyre (1962–1979)
- John A. Durkin (1975–1980)

=== U.S. House ===
In chronological order:

- Franklin Pierce (served 1833–1837)
- Samuel Cushman (1837–1839)
- James Farrington (1837–1839)
- Joseph Weeks (1837–1839)
- Jared W. Williams (1837–1841)
- Charles G. Atherton (1837–1843)
- Ira Allen Eastman (1839–1843)
- Tristram Shaw (1839–1843)
- Edmund Burke (1839–1845)
- John Randall Reding (1841–1845)
- John P. Hale (1843–1845)
- Moses Norris, Jr. (1843–1847)
- Mace Moulton (1845–1847)
- James Hutchins Johnson (1845–1849)
- Charles H. Peaslee (1847–1853)
- Harry Hibbard (1849–1855)
- George W. Morrison (1850–1851; 1853–1855)
- George W. Kittredge (1853–1855)
- Daniel Marcy (1863–1865)
- Ellery Albee Hibbard (1871–1873)
- Samuel Newell Bell (1871–1873; 1875–1877)
- Hosea Washington Parker (1871–1875)
- Frank Jones (1875–1879)
- Luther F. McKinney (1887–1889; 1891–1893)
- Warren F. Daniell (1891–1893)
- Eugene Elliott Reed (1913–1915)
- Raymond Bartlett Stevens (1913–1915)
- William Nathaniel Rogers (1923–1925; 1932–1937)
- Alphonse Roy (1938–1939)
- Joseph Oliva Huot (1965–1967)
- Norman D'Amours (1975–1985)
- Richard Swett (1991–1995)
- Paul Hodes (2007–2011)
- Carol Shea-Porter (2007–2011; 2013–2015; 2017–2019)

== Election results ==
=== Federal ===
==== U.S. House ====
Election	Votes	%	Seats (NH)	±	%
2016	336,575	46.96	2 / 2	▲1	6.33
2018	311,242	54.53	2 / 2	0	7.57
2020	413,469	52.59	2 / 2	0	1.94
2022	339,027	54.90	2 / 2	0	2.31
2024	430,218	53.47	2 / 2	0	1.43
2026	341,628	58.36	2 / 2	0	4.89

== See also ==
- New Hampshire primary
- Governor of New Hampshire
- New Hampshire State House
- New Hampshire Senate
- New Hampshire House of Representatives
