= Jeanie Forrester =

American politician

Chair of the New Hampshire Republican State Committee
- In office January 28, 2017 – July 1, 2018
- Preceded by: Jennifer Horn
- Succeeded by: Wayne MacDonald

Member of the New Hampshire Senate from the 2nd district
- In office December 1, 2010 – December 7, 2016
- Preceded by: Deborah Reynolds
- Succeeded by: Bob Giuda

Personal details
- Born: April 13, 1958 (age 68) Michigan, U.S.
- Party: Republican
- Spouse: Keith Forrester
- Education: University of New Hampshire, Durham (BA, MBA)

Jeanie Forrester was Chairman of the Republican Party of New Hampshire and a former Republican member of the New Hampshire Senate, representing the 2nd district from 2010 until 2016. A businesswoman by trade, Forrester served on the Finance and Public/Municipal Affairs committees. In 2016, Forrester decided not to seek reelection to the senate and instead ran for the republican nomination for Governor of New Hampshire, ultimately losing to Chris Sununu. Sununu later supported Forrester's successful candidacy for party chairman.

== Tenure as New Hampshire Republican State Committee Chairman ==
While running for chairman, Forrester failed to secure a spot on the State Committee from her home County Republican Committee although this did not preclude her from running for chairman. Forrester was endorsed for the position by then Governor-Elect Chris Sununu and ran unopposed for the position as chairman. During Forrester's tenure as party chairman she lost 9 out of 11 special elections. As party finances began to become public, Forrester abruptly resigned from the post. It was shown that Forrester's Democratic counterpart had outraised her 9 to 1. At the time of her departure, the New Hampshire Republican State Committee showed a deficit of $29,102.

== Personal ==
Forrester, a native of Michigan, moved to New Hampshire in 1985. After her graduation from the University of New Hampshire, she went to work for then-Governor John H. Sununu. During this time, Forrester earned a master's degree in Business Administration from the Whittemore School of Business and Economics.

== Political experience ==
Jeanie Forrester served as a senator in the New Hampshire State Senate from 2010 to 2016 In this position, she served in leadership roles on the Finance and Municipal Affairs committees. Forrester was an unsuccessful candidate in the Republican primary for Governor of New Hampshire in 2016. She became chairman of the New Hampshire Republican Party in 2017.

She has been a resident of Meredith, NH since 2001, where she is currently serving her third term as a Select Board Member. In this role, she leads Intergovernmental Affairs for the NH Department of Business and Economic Affairs.

=== Former legislative committees ===
Jeanie Forrester was a member of the following committees:

- Finance, Member
- Public and Municipal Affairs, Vice Chair

== Professional experience ==
Jeanie Forrester has had the following professional experience:

- Co-Owner/Chief Executive Officer, Forrester Environmental Services, Incorporated, present
- Former Executive Director, Governors Initiatives Program for Excellence in Education, Governor John H. Sununu
- Former Legislative Aid, Governor Sununu
- Former Town Administrator, Tuftonboro
- Former Town Administrator, New Durham
- Former Executive Director, Main Street Program, Meredith, New Hampshire
- Former Executive Director, Main Street Program, Plymouth, New Hampshire
- Former Staff Member, New Hampshire Governor John Sununu
- Former Teacher, Business Language, Houston Community College
- Former Secretary, Exxon

== Elections ==
- 2010

Forrester announced her candidacy on April 8, 2010. In the Republican primary in September, she bested incumbent state representative Fran Wendelboe by 911 votes. On election day, which saw a Republican sweep at the state level, Forrester defeated her Democratic opponent, state senator Deborah Reynolds.

- 2016

Forrester decided not to seek reelection to the senate and instead ran for the Republican nomination for Governor of New Hampshire, ultimately losing to Chris Sununu. Sununu later supported Forrester's successful candidacy for party chairman, a role she assumed in early 2017.

New Hampshire Senate
Preceded by Deborah Reynolds	Member of the New Hampshire Senate from the 2nd district 2010–2016	Succeeded by Bob Giuda
Party political offices
Preceded by Jennifer Horn	Chair of the New Hampshire Republican Party; 2017–2018	Succeeded by Wayne MacDonald
