= Political Chowder =

- Presented by: Deborah Arnie Arnesen
- Country of origin: United States
- No. of episodes: Unknown

Production
- Running time: 60 minutes

Original release
- Network: WZMY-TV
- Release: 18 February 2007 – 19 July 2009

Political Chowder was a weekly American talk show concerning national, state and local politics in New Hampshire. It ran from February 18, 2007 to July 19, 2009.

The show was broadcast each Sunday at 11AM by station WZMY-TV and rebroadcast by several public-access television stations around the state.

The program was hosted by former Harvard Institute of Politics fellow Deborah Arnie Arnesen, a former New Hampshire state legislator, gubernatorial candidate and candidate for U.S. Congress. Arnesen additionally hosted a weekday radio program Chowder in the Morning from station WCCM as well as a number of other radio broadcasts. During 2007 Arnesen was awarded "Air Personality of the Year" from the New Hampshire Association of Broadcasters.

Political Chowder was produced in cooperation with Southern New Hampshire University. Guests included national figures such as Senator Ron Paul of Texas, Governor Bill Richardson of New Mexico, former congressman Tom Tancredo of Colorado, Ohio congressman Dennis Kucinich and others, as well as local political figures such as Fergus Cullen, former director of the New Hampshire Republican Party, and Charles Arlinghaus, president of the Josiah Bartlett Center for Public Policy.
