= Debbie Reynolds (disambiguation) =

Debbie Reynolds (1932–2016) was an American actress, singer and dancer.

Debbie, Debby, or Deborah Reynolds may also refer to:

- Debby Reynolds (born 1952), English veterinarian
- Deborah Reynolds (born 1953), American politician
- Debbie Reynolds, English actress who originated the role of Katie Rogers on the soap opera Brookside

== See also ==
- The Debbie Reynolds Show (1969–1970), an American sitcom starring the American actress
- Clarion Hotel and Casino, a demolished hotel in Las Vegas formerly known as Debbie Reynolds' Hollywood Hotel while owned by the American actress
