= Governor Sununu =

Governor Sununu may refer to:

- Chris Sununu (born 1974), 82nd Governor of New Hampshire
- John H. Sununu (born 1939), 75th Governor of New Hampshire and father of Chris
