= Animal control service =

Entity charged with responding to requests for help with animals

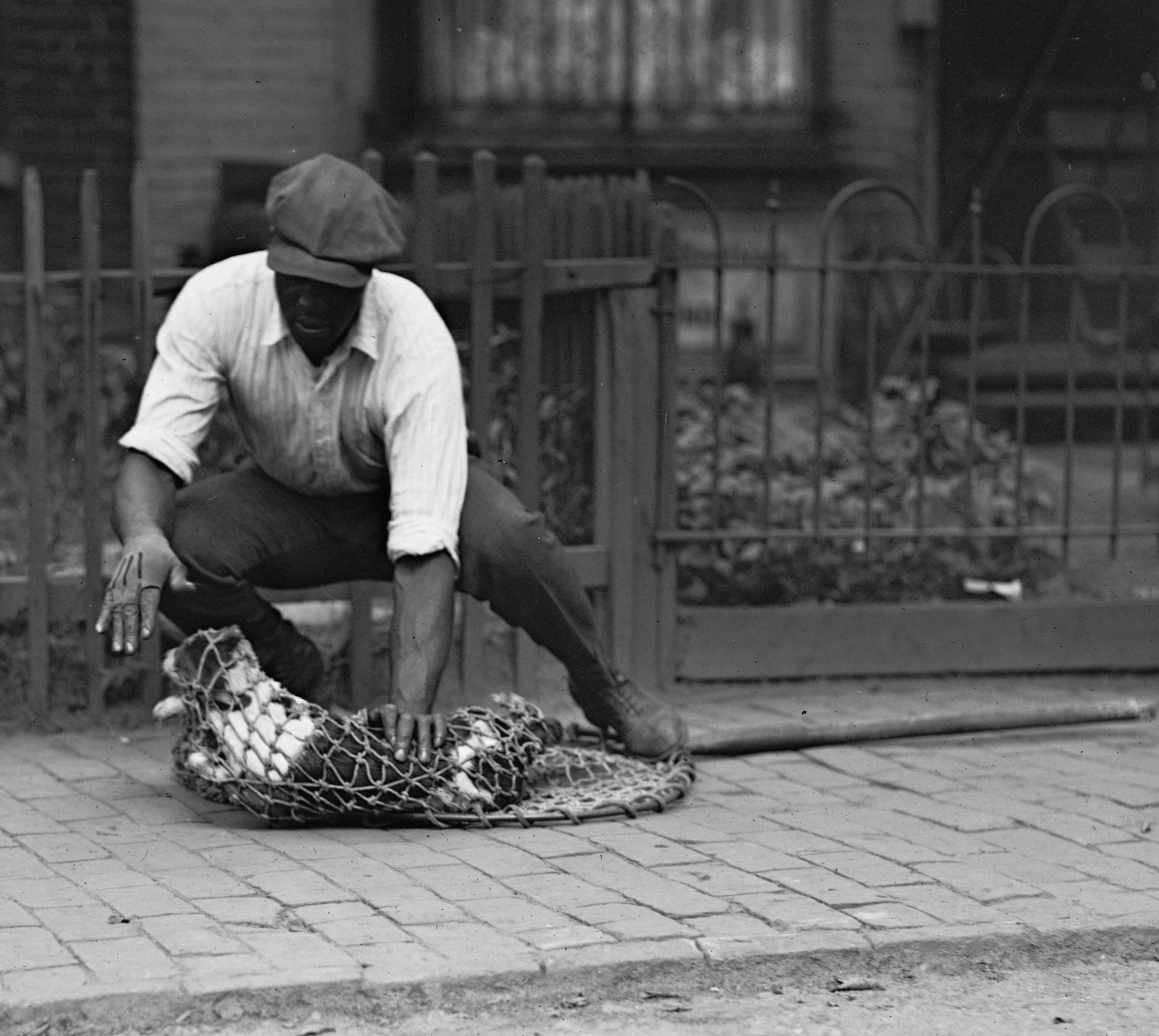
An animal control officer (then known as a dog-catcher) restraining a stray cat in a net.

An animal control service or animal control agency is an entity charged with responding to requests for help with animals, including wild animals, dangerous animals, and animals in distress. An individual who works for such an entity was once known as a dog catcher, but is generally now called an animal control officer, and may be an employee or a contractor – commonly employed by a municipality, county, shire, or other subnational government area.

Historically the netting of feral, stray or unleashed dogs also had important public health and safety benefits, especially during the era of untreatable rabies.

== Duties and function ==
Typically animals that are found will be checked for owner identification, including checking any ID tags, scanning for microchips, and checking for tattoos. Animals may be returned to their owners, or transported to a veterinary clinic or animal shelter. Animals held in the shelter can be returned to their owners, adopted, released to the wild, held as evidence in a criminal investigation or euthanized.

Animal control services may be provided by the government or through a contract with a humane society or society for the prevention of cruelty to animals. Officers may work for, or with, police or sheriff departments, parks and recreation departments, and health departments by confining animals or investigating animal bites to humans.

Active cruelty to animals may be an indicator of serious psychological or violence problems. Because of these links, in some places animal control officers have begun to look for and report on other issues.

=== Legal details in the United States of America ===
The most common requirements for this job is some prior experience handling animals on a farm, as a veterinary assistant or animal trainer. Training is primarily on the job but some jurisdictions (like Virginia, North Carolina and Texas) require formal and continuing education available from community colleges and trade associations.

Some animal cruelty investigators are specially trained police officers. The New York American Society for the Prevention of Cruelty to Animals (ASPCA) formerly employed and Animal Care Centers of NYC (ACC) currently employs several Humane Law Enforcement Officers with some police powers (including the power of arrest) and the Oregon Humane Society employs Humane Special Agents in partnership with the Oregon State Police who are fully-sworn law enforcement officers. Throughout the United States this arrangement is becoming more common.

== Politics ==
An American colloquialism labels an unpopular politician by saying that they "couldn't be elected dogcatcher", with "dogcatcher" referring to a very low-level elected office.

In practice, animal control officers are generally appointed by an executive authority and not elected. However, historic equivalents such as poundmaster, which was tasked with the control of stray livestock, and hog reeve, whose mandate extended exclusively to stray swine, were elective offices in Colonial and early American New England. The town of Duxbury, Vermont, was said to be the only place in the contemporary United States that actually elects a dog catcher, but electing of dogcatchers was found to be illegal in Vermont in 2018. The job was then designated as appointment-only, with Zeb Towne, the last elected dogcatcher in Duxbury, being unanimously appointed to the position.
