= Bob Giuda =

American politician

Member of the New Hampshire Senate from the 2nd district
- In office December 7, 2016 – December 7, 2022
- Preceded by: Jeanie Forrester
- Succeeded by: Timothy Lang Sr.

Member of the New Hampshire House of Representatives
- In office January 3, 2001 – January 3, 2007
- Constituency: Grafton District 4 Grafton District 5 (After Redistricting)

Personal details
- Born: February 21, 1952 (age 74) New York, New York
- Party: Republican
- Spouse: Christine Giuda
- Children: Joseph; Lauren; Stephanie
- Education: United States Naval Academy
- Occupation: International Airline Captain
- Website: www.bobgiuda.com

Robert J. Giuda (born February 21, 1952) (/ˈɡaɪdə/) is a former international airline captain, former United States Marine and later New Hampshire state senator for the 2nd district from Warren, New Hampshire.

== Early life ==
Giuda graduated from Pittsfield High School and was appointed to the United States Naval Academy, graduating in 1975 with a B.S. in Operations Analysis. He was commissioned a Second Lieutenant in the United States Marine Corps, and went on to serve 9 years as a Naval Aviator.

== Military service and civilian life ==
Giuda's military career included active duty tours as a Marine Corps pilot aboard the USS Midway (CV-41), and as a flight instructor with the Navy's EA-6B training squadron at Whidbey Island, Washington. Reserve tours included pilot and Safety Officer with VMAQ-4 at Whidbey Island; and pilot with VMA-133 at Alameda, California. He flew numerous aircraft including the EA-6A, EA-6B, A-7E and A-4F Skyhawk. During his military service, he attended numerous schools, and completed the Aviation Safety Officer course at the United States Naval Postgraduate School, Monterey, California.

After the Marine Corps, Giuda served as a pilot for the Federal Bureau of Investigation (FBI) for 1 year before leaving government service to pursue an airline career. As a result, he was employed as a captain for United Airlines.

== Political career ==
Giuda's political career began with the formation of the town of Warren Economic Development Committee, which ultimately resulted in an assessment of the community by the New Hampshire Rural Development Corporation. He was appointed and then elected as a selectman and chairman of the selectboard in Warren, New Hampshire, from 1998 to 2001. In 2000, he was elected to the New Hampshire House of Representatives, serving three consecutive terms in office. He opted not to seek a fourth term in 2006. While in the House, he was assigned to the Ways and Means and Labor and Rules committees and rose to the position of Deputy Majority Leader.

Giuda successfully sponsored a constitutional amendment that limited the government's power of eminent domain after the controversial U.S. Supreme Court ruling in Kelo v. City of New London. He also co-sponsored numerous bills supporting a state spending cap, a constitutional amendment banning a New Hampshire income tax, and limiting judicial legislation from the bench.

In 2016, Giuda was elected as a New Hampshire state senator for District 2.

In March 2022, NHPR revealed that 300 New Hampshire-related names were found on a leaked Oath Keepers' database. Giuda's name was on the list. Giuda told NHPR, "he distanced himself from the organization soon after its involvement in the 2014 armed standoff with federal authorities at a Nevada ranch owned by Cliven Bundy." Giuda also told NHPR, "I left that group years ago, I wasn’t comfortable with the way the group was being run." New Hampshire Democratic Party chair Ray Buckley said, "If Senator Giuda truly is no longer a member of this organization, it is absolutely essential he immediately provide corroborating documentation to show this is the case."

== National presence and international affairs ==
In October 2001, shortly after the September 11 attacks, he appeared on national television to advocate training and arming qualified commercial airline pilots to prevent against future hijackings. Guida was among the founding pilots of the Airline Pilots Security Alliance, which lobbied Congress in support of the Federal Flight Deck Officer program that exists today to enable pilots to defend against future hijackings.

=== Kashmir and human rights advocacy ===
In December 2002 and February 2003, just before the U.S. invasion of Iraq, Giuda traveled to Pakistan-held Kashmir on a series of fact-finding missions to investigate actions against Muslim civilians allegedly being committed by the Indian Armed Forces and paramilitary forces. The mission included meetings with military leaders, members of Pakistan's cabinet, the National Assembly of Pakistan and Senate, and former President Pervez Musharraf. Upon returning to New Hampshire, Giuda drafted and successfully shepherded a House Concurrent Resolution which led to U.S. House hearings on Kashmir.

Bob Giuda in Kashmir with Pakistani child orphaned after earthquake in 2005

He later founded and chaired Americans for Resolution of Kashmir or "ARK" to educate Americans about the conflict in Kashmir. Upon returning to the United States, Giuda was featured on the front page of The New York Times International section as a result of the investigation; he also personally helped Pakistan's president prepare for meetings with U.S. diplomats at Camp David. Giuda presided over a panel discussion on "The Human Rights Dimension of the Kashmir Problem," where speakers from both sides of the issue respectively placed blame for Kashmir insurgency on Indian human rights violations and Kashmiri freedom fighters.

In November 2005, he led a humanitarian relief team to the small village of Kafal Garh, 6,000 feet (1,800 m) above sea level in Kashmir, in the aftermath of the deadly October earthquake that killed an estimated 80,000 people in Pakistan. The team provided funding to construct metal shelters to deal with the onset of winter and an average snowfall of 28 feet (8.5 m).

== 2010 congressional campaign ==
In June 2009, he formed an exploratory committee for New Hampshire's 2nd congressional district seat. He announced his candidacy in October 2009 and officially filed as a candidate with the New Hampshire Secretary of State on June 8, 2010.

Incumbent Paul Hodes was seeking the U.S. Senate seat held by Judd Gregg, who was retiring. Hodes' intention to run for Senate left an open seat in New Hampshire's 2nd congressional district, for which five Republicans and two Democrats declared and filed as candidates.

The Second Congressional District at the time of the election consisted of the western and northern portions of the state, including all of Cheshire, Coos, Grafton, and Sullivan counties as well as almost all of Merrimack and Hillsborough counties plus three towns in Rockingham County and two towns in Belknap County. It comprised 171 towns and 7 cities. Giuda came in third in the Republican primary election held on September 14, 2010.

== Views on issues ==
=== Guns ===
Giuda supports the right to bear arms and believes that this right has been severely compromised in modern America. He has pledged to oppose any legislation which interferes with a citizen's right to keep and bear arms, except in the case of felons. As part of the Airline Pilots Security Alliance, Giuda worked to establish the Federal Flight Deck Officer program which arms and trains airline pilots to defend against future hijackings.

=== Privacy ===
He opposes increasing the amount of biometric information on government identification cards. One of the reasons that he opposes government intrusion into the healthcare system is the access authorities might have to private healthcare information.

=== Budgetary issues ===
During a June 2010 appearance in Salem, New Hampshire, an audience member asked Giuda to name specific budgetary cuts he would make. He named five departments he believes need to be curbed on both the budgetary and regulatory fronts:

- The Environmental Protection Agency; he states that he is in favor of responsible management of resources but gave an example of excessive regulation.
- The Department of Agriculture
- The Department of Energy; he cites the 2010 Deepwater Horizon oil spill as an example of excessive expenditures and poor performance of the DOE.
- The Department of Education
- The General Services Administration, which he says is "utterly unnecessary" with today's computer technology and the management expertise available in individual government departments and agencies

=== USA PATRIOT Act ===
Giuda believes the Patriot Act "is the worst form of destruction done to the Constitution, I think, in our country's history" and that "I would take 9/11 all over again rather than the thrashing our Constitution has taken."

=== Civil unions ===
In 2001, Giuda voted in support of New Hampshire HB454 as put forward by House Republican Daniel C. Itse which would have prohibited New Hampshire from recognizing of out-of-state civil unions. Giuda contends that this is consistent with his position today.

=== Same-sex marriage ===
After an appearance at Rivier College in Nashua, New Hampshire, on June 28, 2010, in response to inquiries by members of his audience Giuda characterized some potential dangers he sees in same-sex marriage by saying "What's next? Men and sheep? Women and dogs?" He indicated his belief that same-sex marriage is the "downfall of the nation" in response to a question by another audience member and had previously indicated that he considered homosexuality to have been instrumental in the collapse of a number of previous civilizations such as Classical-era Greek Sparta.

Later, Giuda specified that these remarks were made in the context of a discussion on institutionalizing marriage and said that his meaning was that "it is not to our good as a nation or a society to institutionalize relationships that do not involve a man and a woman for the protection of a family."
