= John Sununu =

John Sununu may refer to:

- John H. Sununu (born 1939), Governor of New Hampshire 1983–1989 and White House Chief of Staff for George H. W. Bush
- John E. Sununu (born 1964), his son, U.S. Congressman 1997–2003 and U.S. Senator 2003–2009, representing New Hampshire
