= Chris Spirou =

American politician

Chris Spirou is a politician of New Hampshire.

He was born in 1943 in the town of Porti in the prefecture of Karditsa, in the province of Thessaly, Greece, and migrated in 1956 to the United States of America. He attended Saint Anselm College in Goffstown, New Hampshire, and holds a master's degree in urban studies and social change from Goddard College, Vermont.

Spirou has been a guest lecturer at universities including Harvard University and Dartmouth College and taught a course as an adjunct professor at New Hampshire College, now Southern New Hampshire University.

In 1970, he was elected to the New Hampshire House of Representatives. Spirou served as House Minority Leader from 1975 to 1984 and was the Democratic nominee for governor in 1984, but was defeated by incumbent John Sununu, Spirou later served as chair of the state Democratic Party, but returned to Greece in 1993.

In 1994, Spirou was elected president of the board of the Hellenic American Union (HAU), an Athens-based non-profit association founded in 1957 to promote U.S.-Greek educational and cultural ties, including through English teaching and testing. Income from HAU's testing program funded the creation of the Hellenic American University by an act of the New Hampshire state legislature in 2004, with Spirou as first president. He remained on the board of the University after stepping down as president in 2012.

While in Athens, Spirou established friendly ties with Slobodan Milošević, the president of Serbia, who invited him to be a member of the Serbian delegation to the Dayton peace talks in 1995.

Party political offices
Preceded by Hugh Gallen	Democratic nominee for Governor of New Hampshire; 1984	Succeeded by Paul McEachern
