= VMFA-142 =

Marine Fighter Attack Squadron 142
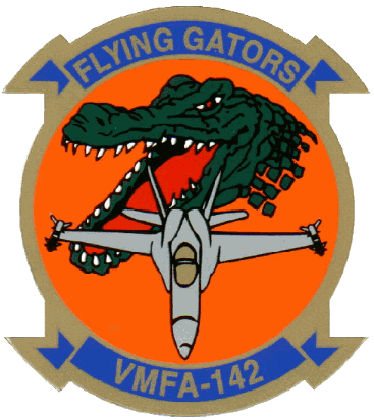
- VMFA-142 insignia
- Active: 1 March 1942 - July 2008
- Country: United States
- Branch: United States Marine Corps
- Type: Fighter/Attack
- Role: Close air support Air interdiction Aerial reconnaissance
- Part of: Inactive
- Nickname: Flying Gators
- Tail Code: MB & AF
- Engagements: World War II; Operation Iraqi Freedom

Marine Fighter Attack Squadron 142 (VMFA-142) was an aviation unit of the United States Marine Corps Reserve that was active from 1942 to 2008. At the time of its inactivation, the squadron was based at Naval Air Station Atlanta, Georgia and fell under the command of Marine Aircraft Group 42 (MAG-42), 4th Marine Aircraft Wing (4th MAW). Due to a re-organization within Marine aviation, the squadron moved to Naval Air Station Fort Worth Joint Reserve Base, Texas and was placed in a cadre status under Marine Aircraft Group 41.

== Mission ==
Plan for the conduct of air operations in support of the Fleet Marine Force, supervise and train selected Marine Corps Reserve units, provide administrative and logistical support for selected Marine Corps Reserve units, and ensure mobilization readiness.

== History ==
=== World War II ===
Squadron logo when they were VMSB-142

VMFA-142 was first activated on 1 March 1942 at Camp Kearny, California as Marine Scout Bombing Squadron 142 (VMSB-142), Marine Aircraft Group 14, 1st Marine Aircraft Wing, Fleet Marine Force. It was assigned during August 1942 to Marine Aircraft Group 12, 2nd Marine Aircraft Wing before being reassigned during September 1942 to Marine Aircraft Group 11. The squadron was deployed from October to November 1942 to Espiritu Santo, New Hebrides, and reassigned to Marine Aircraft Group 11. During the next ten months they flew in support of operations on Guadalcanal and did not lose one pilot in combat over that time. The squadron was equipped with the Douglas SBD Dauntless.

During World War II, VMFA-142 participated in the following Campaigns:

- Guadalcanal
- Southern Solomons
- Luzon
- Southern Philippines

The squadron relocated in August 1943 to Marine Corps Air Station El Toro, California, and was reassigned to Marine Base Defense Aircraft Group 41. It relocated during April 1944 to Marine Corps Air Station Ewa, Hawaii, and was reassigned to Marine Aircraft Group 32.

=== Post World War II ===
The squadron was deactivated 21 September 1945 and reactivated 1 July 1946 at Naval Air Station Miami, Florida, as Marine Fighting Squadron 142 (VMF-142) and assigned to Marine Air Detachment, Naval Air Reserve Training Unit, Naval Air Station, Miami, Florida. The "Flying Gators" were reassigned in December 1946 to the Marine Air Reserve Training Command, Naval Air Reserve Training Unit, Naval Air Station, Miami, Florida.

The squadron was redesignated 1 April 1949 as Marine Fighter Squadron 142, Marine Air Reserve Training Command, Naval Air Station Miami, Florida, later itself redesignated in February 1952 as Marine Corps Air Station Miami, Florida.

The squadron was redesignated in September 1953 as Marine Fighter Squadron 142, Marine Air Reserve Training Detachment, Marine Air Reserve Training Command, Marine Corps Air Station Miami, Florida. The squadron was yet again redesignated on 15 May 1958 as Marine Attack Squadron 142 (VMA-142) and relocated during March 1959 to Naval Air Station Jacksonville, Florida.

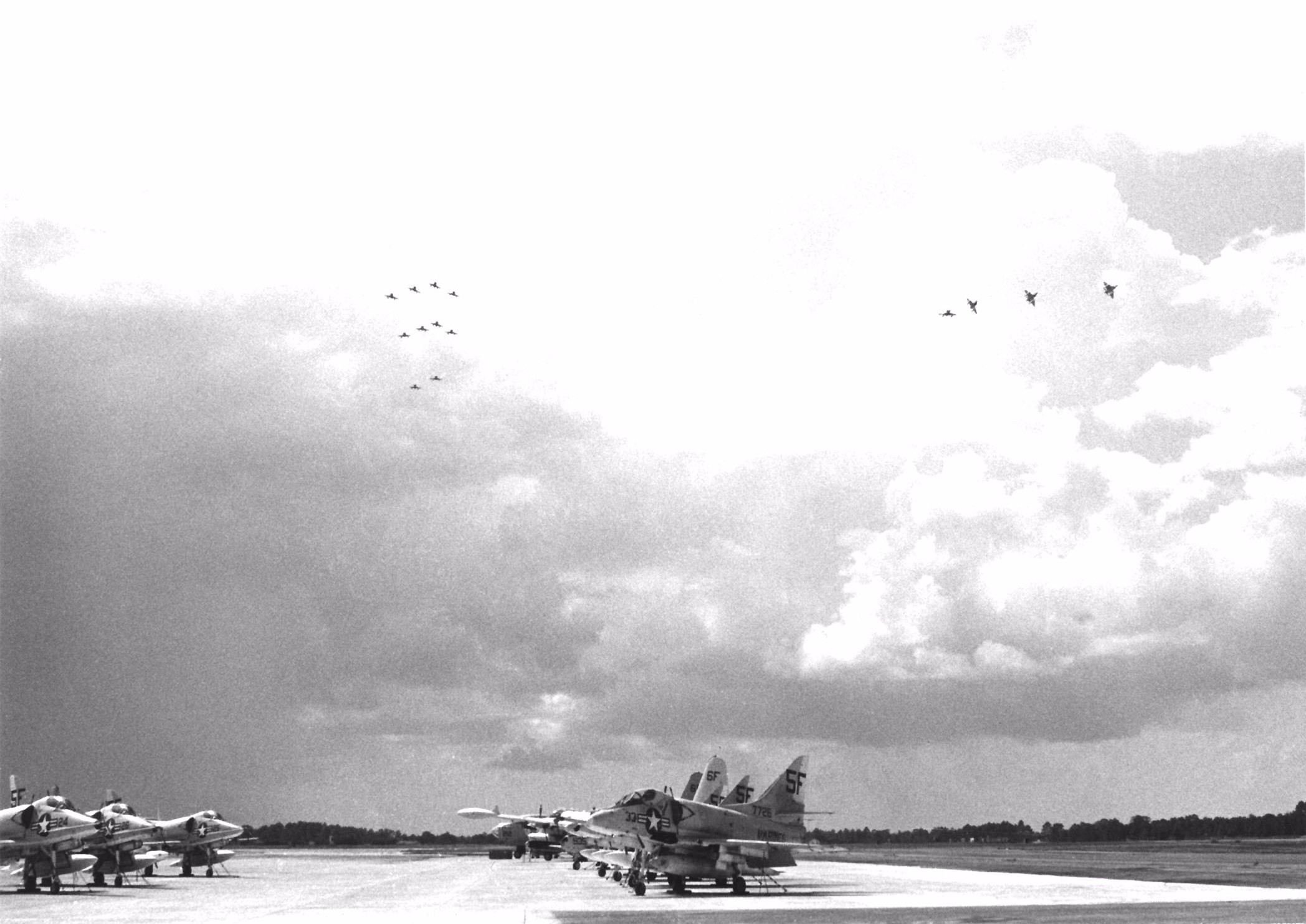
VMA-142 A-4Cs at NAS Jacksonville in 1970.

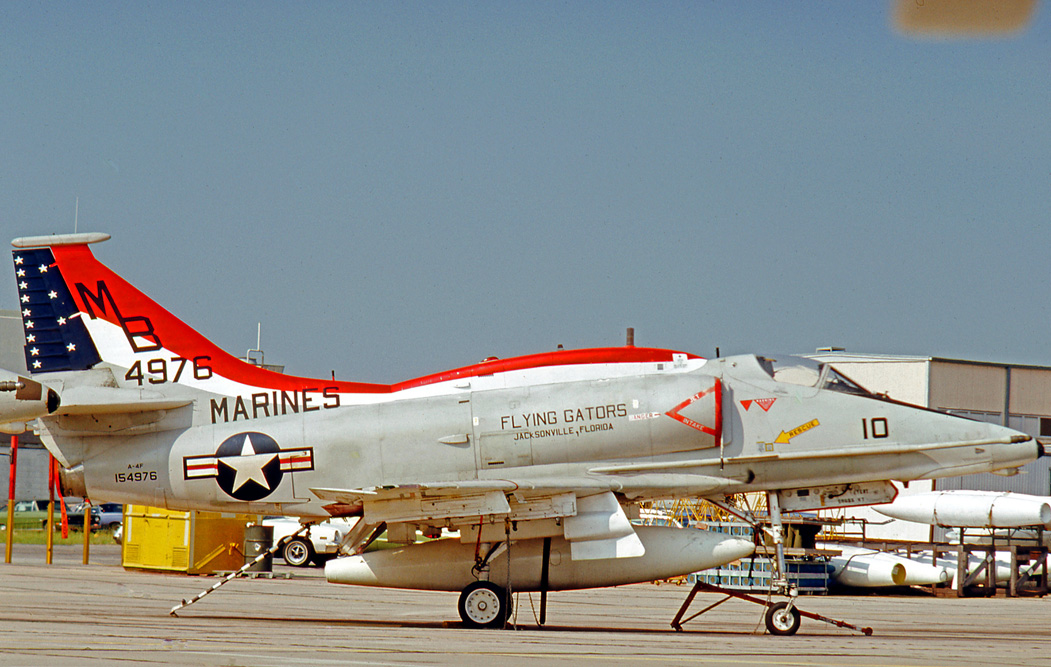
Douglas A-4F Skyhawk of VMA-142 at their NAS Jacksonville base in 1976 wearing their Flying Gators nickname

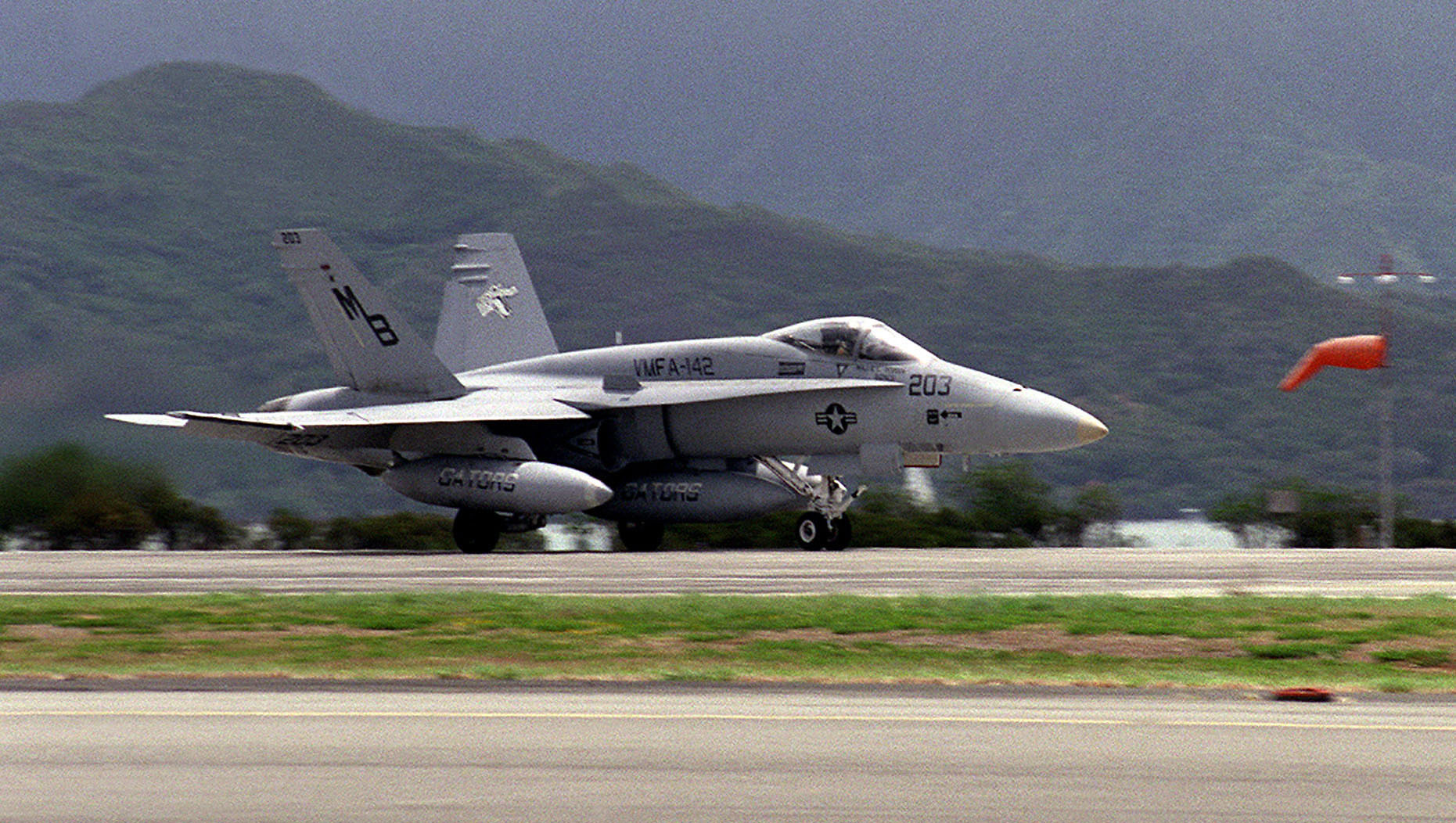
A VMFA-142 F/A-18 at MCAS Kaneohe Bay, 2005.

The squadron was reassigned during January 1971 to the 4th Marine Aircraft Wing, Fleet Marine Force before relocating during December 1978 from NAS Jacksonville to nearby Naval Air Station Cecil Field, Florida. Soon thereafter, in January 1979, the squadron was reassigned to Marine Aircraft Group 42 Detachment, 4th Marine Aircraft Wing, Fleet Marine Force and, a year later in January 1980, reassigned again to Marine Aircraft Group 42, Detachment A, 4th Marine Aircraft Wing, Fleet Marine Force.

During the early 70's the squadron flew the J-65 powered A-4L before transitioning to the newer J52-P-408 powered A-4F. The last A-4L departed in the summer of 1976. As active duty A-4 units transitioned to the AV-8B during the 80's, their A-4M's replaced reserve unit A-4F's.

The squadron converted from the A-4M Skyhawk II to the F/A-18A Hornet and was formally redesignated on 21 December 1990 as Marine Fighter Attack Squadron 142 (VMFA-142).

In August 1997, due to the pending BRAC 93-mandated closure of NAS Cecil Field by the end of 1999, the squadron relocated to Naval Air Station Atlanta, approximately 25 miles (40 km) North of Atlanta in Marietta, Georgia. It was the second F/A-18 squadron to be transferred to NAS Atlanta, having been preceded by the Naval Air Reserve's Strike Fighter Squadron TWO ZERO THREE (VFA-203), which was also previously based at NAS Cecil Field.

VMFA-142 became part of the Department of the Navy TACAIR concept, which integrates both Marine Corps F/A-18 fighter/attack squadrons and Navy F/A-18 strike fighter squadrons into Navy carrier air wings. As a Marine Air Reserve squadron, VMFA-142 integrated into Carrier Air Wing Reserve TWENTY (CVWR-20).

In May 2000, in a first for CVWR-20, five Marine Hornets from VMFA-142 joined the wing for carrier qualification, qualifying all five pilots. Three of the Hornets then flew to Naval Station Roosevelt Roads, Puerto Rico for additional Fleet training operations.

=== Global War on Terror ===
In February 2005, VMFA-142 became the first fixed wing Marine reserve fighter unit activated to combat since the Korean War. They deployed in support of Operation Iraqi Freedom and served at Al Asad Air Base, providing combat support in the Al Anbar province of Iraq until September 2005.

In accordance with a Base Realignment and Closure (BRAC) Commission decision directing the closure of Naval Air Station Atlanta and its transfer to the Air Force Reserve Command as part of Dobbins Air Reserve Base, VMFA-142 was placed in cadre status in July 2008. Plans from 2010 to transition the squadron to the F-35B Lightning II Joint Strike Fighter by 2019 have since been scrapped, and the squadron no longer appears in the transition plan Marine Corps Aviation Plan 2017.

== Notable former members ==
- Christopher George - actor that served with the squadron during the 1950s

== See also ==
- United States Marine Corps Aviation
- List of active United States Marine Corps aircraft squadrons
- List of decommissioned United States Marine Corps aircraft squadrons
