= Animal Care Centers of NYC =

US not-for-profit corporation

Animal Care Centers of NYC (ACC)
- Formation: 1994
- Headquarters: New York City, New York, US
- Website: www.nycacc.org

Animal Care Centers of NYC (ACC), formerly known as Animal Care & Control of NYC and Center for Animal Care and Control (CACC), is a not-for-profit corporation that was formed for the purpose of providing animal control services in New York City. ACC was created in 1994 to assume the responsibilities of the American Society for the Prevention of Cruelty to Animals (ASPCA), after the ASPCA decided not to renew its contract to run New York City's animal shelter system. ACC entered into its own contract with the New York City Department of Health (DOH), and on January 1, 1995, followed the ASPCA as New York City's provider of animal care and control services. It has a nine-member board of directors, which includes as ex officio members the Commissioner of Department of Health, the Commissioner of New York City Department of Parks and Recreation and the Deputy Commissioner for Community Affairs at the New York City Police Department (NYPD). The six remaining members of the Board are appointed by the mayor.

== Financials ==
Funding for ACC comes from several sources. A contract with the Department of Health (DOH) provided $10.6 million for FY 2013. An additional $3.1M came from individual donations, grants and miscellaneous sources. Financial statements dating back to 2008 are available on-line on the nycacc.org website.

== Board meetings ==
Board meetings are held twice per year and are open to the public. The format for these meetings involves a discussion of financials, intake/outcome numbers, development/communications plans and operations reviews. The presentation is given by the executive director and is followed by open commentary from the public. In March 2014 the board meeting included a presentation from the medical director.

== Programs and services ==
Animal Care Centers of NYC (ACC) has three full-service Animal Care Centers located in Manhattan, Brooklyn and Staten Island, as well as two Admissions Centers located in the Bronx and Queens. Animal Control Officers are in the field to assist animals and people in need in all five boroughs. ACC's Field Operations respond to calls from the public regarding animals that are in need of rescue, pose a threat to public safety, stray dogs, and injured dogs and cats that need extra help.

== Partners ==
The New Hope program is ACC's proactive community initiative aimed at finding homes for New York City's unwanted pet population. To accomplish this, ACC establishes and cultivates mutually beneficial and productive relationships with cat, dog, rabbit and exotic animal placement organizations that assist and partner with ACC in placing animals, many of which may require specialized medical care or behavior training. In 2013 New Hope partners accounted for 70% of all placements, finding homes for over 14,000 animals. AC&C placed 6,148 or roughly 30%.

New Hope partners take ownership of ACC animals and care for them in shelters, foster homes, boarding facilities and/or their own private facilities prior to placing them in permanent homes through their own adoption process. New Hope is part of the Placement Department at ACC, which also includes Adoptions, Foster Program, and Behavior. ACC employs New Hope staff to serve as direct contacts for New Hope partners, to respond to inquiries about animals of interest, to communicate information about animals most in need of placement and to ultimately process the final placement of animals with partner organizations.

A key partner to the New Hope program is the Mayor's Alliance for NYC's Animals. Through their Wheels of Hope program, they transport animals to New Hope partners seven days a week. They also support New Hope partners with transport for spay/neuter appointments.

== Criticisms ==
ACC receives $10 million from its contract with the City of New York. This is less than $1.50 per person for a city of 11 million citizens. A 2009 report by the Humane Society of the United States entitled "Animal Sheltering Trends in the U.S." found that on average communities spend $8.00 per capita on animal shelters.

In November 2010 an investigation by Eyewitness News entitled "Allegations of neglect at city animal shelter" claimed that care and exercise were being withheld from animals in the shelter due to citywide budget cuts.

In January 2013 then Manhattan Borough President released a report entitled "Led Astray: Reforming NYC's Animal Care & Control" asking that the shelter be run as a private non-profit completely separate from the NYC Department of Health. The report cited the success of the multimillion-dollar Central Park Conservancy as a model for how the city shelter could be run successfully and fully financed by the citizens of NYC.

In 2013 AC&C experienced its lowest rate of euthanasia in city history at 4,843 animals (not including 1,279 owner requested euthanasia). With an intake of 30,264 animals that is a rate of 20% down from 74% euthanasia in 2003.

In March 2014 the New York Daily News published an article entitled "City animal shelters see boost in adoptions and drop in euthanasia" citing various improvements to the condition and care of shelter animals. AC&C still has to euthanize almost 5,000 animals a year due primarily to illnesses from poor ventilation in the shelter, as indicated by shelter director Risa Weinstock during the shelter's quarterly meetings.

In the following news release of April 19, 2015, by the office of New York City Comptroller Scott Stringer, an extensive list of concerns found during an audit of NYCACC cited mismanagement of medications, expired medications, and storage of animal remains along with food meant for human consumption among the numerous discrepancies:

"Animal Care & Control (AC&C) of New York City does not ensure the safety of drugs and vaccines it administers, fails to track them efficiently, operates an overcrowded shelter in Manhattan, and potentially unsafe facilities, according to an audit released today by New York City Comptroller Scott Stringer.

"Animal Care & Control is running an operation that could make your stomach turn," Comptroller Stringer said. "We found expired drugs, harmful conditions, and vaccines stored next to frozen remains. How we treat our most vulnerable creatures is a reflection of our decency as a society, and AC&C is failing in that important responsibility." AC&C, a non-profit corporation, has a 5-year, $51.9 million contract with the Department of Health & Mental Hygiene (DOHMH) to provide shelter, examine, test, treat, spay, neuter and assure the humane care and disposition of animals in shelters located in Manhattan, Brooklyn and Staten Island, along with drop-off centers in Queens and the Bronx. The audit examined four-months (December 2013 through March 2014) of controlled substance logs, and shelter conditions were observed on several occasions between March and November 2014. In addition, auditors examined AC&C's financial operations for FY 2013 and sought to determine if it had adequate controls to ensure proper operational and financial accountability.

Auditors found that animals’ health was put at risk by AC&C's failure to oversee controlled substances in all three shelters. A review of logs found 499 occasions in which expired drugs were given to animals. Auditors found that the Manhattan shelter distributed 489 expired tablets of Tramadol, an opioid; in the Brooklyn facility, expired doses of Diazepam, a form of valium, were given to at least three animals. Additionally, 92 bottles of expired controlled substances—some as old as 13 years—had not been removed from the premises.

The Comptroller's audit also found that AC&C:

Failed to effectively oversee controlled substances: Lacking a computerized inventory system, AC&C shelters generally relied on only one person at each shelter to complete the request, receipt and recording of their controlled substances inventory — which included opioids, sedatives, and a potentially deadly barbiturate. During the four-month review period, auditors found discrepancies in records involving 224 bottles of injectable, controlled substances. AC&C could not account for 239 tablets and the equivalent of 43 bottles of injectable liquids of controlled substances across all three shelter locations in Manhattan, Brooklyn and Staten Island. Stored vaccines in food refrigerators and alongside animal remains: Auditors found vaccines and employee lunches stored together at the Brooklyn shelter, despite Centers for Disease Control and Prevention guidelines that vaccines should never be stored in the same refrigerator as food or beverages. At the Manhattan shelter, auditors found vaccines stored in a freezer alongside animal remains.

Allowed poor shelter conditions to exist, until auditors notified AC&C and DOHMH officials: At the Brooklyn shelter, poor ventilation contributed to a strong gas odor, while a shared climate control system between isolation rooms for sick animals and rooms with healthy animals increased the risk of spreading contagious diseases. The Manhattan shelter had kennels lined up along the hallways of the facility due to overcrowding. Although there was a large city-owned space next door, AC&C used this space for storage, instead of converting the area into usable space for animals. At the Staten Island shelter, auditors found a defective fire alarm as well as peeling paint above dog kennels and feeding areas. Weak and ineffective financial controls: Inadequate policies and procedures resulted in nearly $12,000 in credit card expenses that lacked adequate documentation as business expenses. Late payments incurred $18,000 in late fees and interest in FY 2013. AC&C also failed to provide a cost-benefit analysis of its planned move from office headquarters in Lower Manhattan, for which it has paid more than $221,000 in rental expenses annually since 2012. "Our audit indicates a lack of effective management and financial and operational negligence. As a result, questionable conditions put the well-being of the animal population at risk," Stringer said. "Our City can and must do a better job of treating homeless animals with compassion and respect." The audit set forth 18 recommendations to both Animal Care & Control and the Department of Health and Mental Hygiene, the agency responsible for AC&C's contract compliance.

These recommendations include: Implementing a computerized inventory system to accurately track controlled substances; Establishing policies to ensure controlled substances are handled in accordance with DEA guidelines; Ensure that expenses are documented and that accurate purchasing documents are provided; and Conduct a cost benefit feasibility study to determine if moving headquarters is appropriate. The DOHMH and AC&C fully agreed with the majority of the recommendations in their response to the audit. Notably, DOHMH agreed to amend its new contract with AC&C to include a requirement that AC&C implement a system of internal controls to include formal policies and procedures for its operations.
