= U.S.-Azerbaijan Chamber of Commerce =

United States – Azerbaijan Chamber of Commerce (USACC)
- Founded: 1995
- Founder: James Baker III
- Type: Advocacy group
- Purpose: Business advocacy
- Location: Washington D.C.
- Region served: United States
- Method: Media attention, direct-appeal campaigns political lobbying
- Key people: T. Don Stacy (chairman emeritus), James A. Baker, IV (co-chair) and Reza Vaziri (co-chair)
- Website: USACC official website

The United States – Azerbaijan Chamber of Commerce (USACC) is a not-for-profit lobbying group aiming to develop long-term business ties between the firms in the United States and Azerbaijan, and attract US investment to Azerbaijan.

== Mission ==
The mission of the USACC is to facilitate and encourage investment and trade between US and Azerbaijan; provide a medium for interaction for NGOs, business firms and think tanks from these countries; assist and promote commercial objectives of businesses investing in Azerbaijan; promote Azerbaijan's potential; sponsor educational programs, trade missions, seminars, conferences and publications; enhance understanding between the two nations by establishing and developing cultural links. In September 2000, USACC founded Azerbaijan Trade and Cultural Center (ATCC) to stimulate intercultural ties between United States and Azerbaijan.

Many businesses, including ones from Fortune 500 Companies are members of USACC. USACC has been the driving force behind world's longest oil pipeline, Baku-Tbilisi-Ceyhan and Baku-Tbilisi-Erzurum gas pipeline, operational today. The chamber actively promoted commercial links in agriculture, construction, information technology, alternative energy and tourism.

== Leadership ==
The chamber is chaired by T. Don Stacy, co-chaired by James A. Baker, IV (Baker Botts, LLP) and Reza Vaziri (R.V. Investment Group).

Honorary Council of Advisors includes former secretary of state James Baker III, former National Security Advisor to U.S. President Zbigniew Brzezinski, former secretary of state and assistant to U.S. president on national security affairs Henry Kissinger, former assistant to U.S. president on National Security Affairs Brent Scowcroft, former chief of staff to the U.S. president, John Sununu.

== Board of directors ==
- Ali Agan, CEO, Azercell Telekom
- Shapoor Ansari, MD
- Halim Ates, CEO, Telia Sonera
- Farhad Azima, chairman and CEO, Aviation Leasing Group
- Scott Blacklin, vice president, Cisco Systems
- Betty Blair, editor, Azerbaijan International
- Ian M. Davis, vice president, Occidental Petroleum Corporation
- Jahangir Hajiyev, chairman, International Bank of Azerbaijan
- Albert Marchetti, vice president, Hess Corporation
- Robert Moran, vice president, Halliburton
- Greg Saunders, director, International Affairs, BP
- Diana L. Sedney, manager, International Government Relations, Chevron
- Michael White, Azerbaijan country manager, ExxonMobil
- Gregory K. Williams, strategic security manager, Coca-Cola Bottling Co.

Former directors include former Vice President of the United States Dick Cheney and former Deputy Secretary of State Richard Armitage.
