= New Hampshire Republican State Committee =

New Hampshire affiliate of the Republican Party

- Chairperson: Scott Maltzie
- Governor: Kelly Ayotte
- Senate President: Sharon Carson
- House Speaker: Sherman Packard
- Founded: October 12, 1853, in Exeter
- Headquarters: 10 Water St., Concord, New Hampshire 03301
- Membership (2024): ▲325,221
- Ideology: Conservatism
- National affiliation: Republican Party
- Colors: Red (unofficial)
- U.S. Senate seats: 0 / 2
- U.S. House seats: 0 / 2
- Statewide executive office: 1 / 1
- Executive Council: 4 / 5
- State Senate: 16 / 24
- State House: 214 / 400

Election symbol

Website
- www.nh.gop

The New Hampshire Republican Party is the affiliate of the United States Republican Party in New Hampshire. Its executive committee is headed by Chairman Scott Maltzie.

Republicans hold the office of Governor, as well as a majority in the State House of Representatives, and a supermajority in the State Senate, while Democrats hold both U.S. Senate Seats and House of Representatives seats.

== Elected officials ==
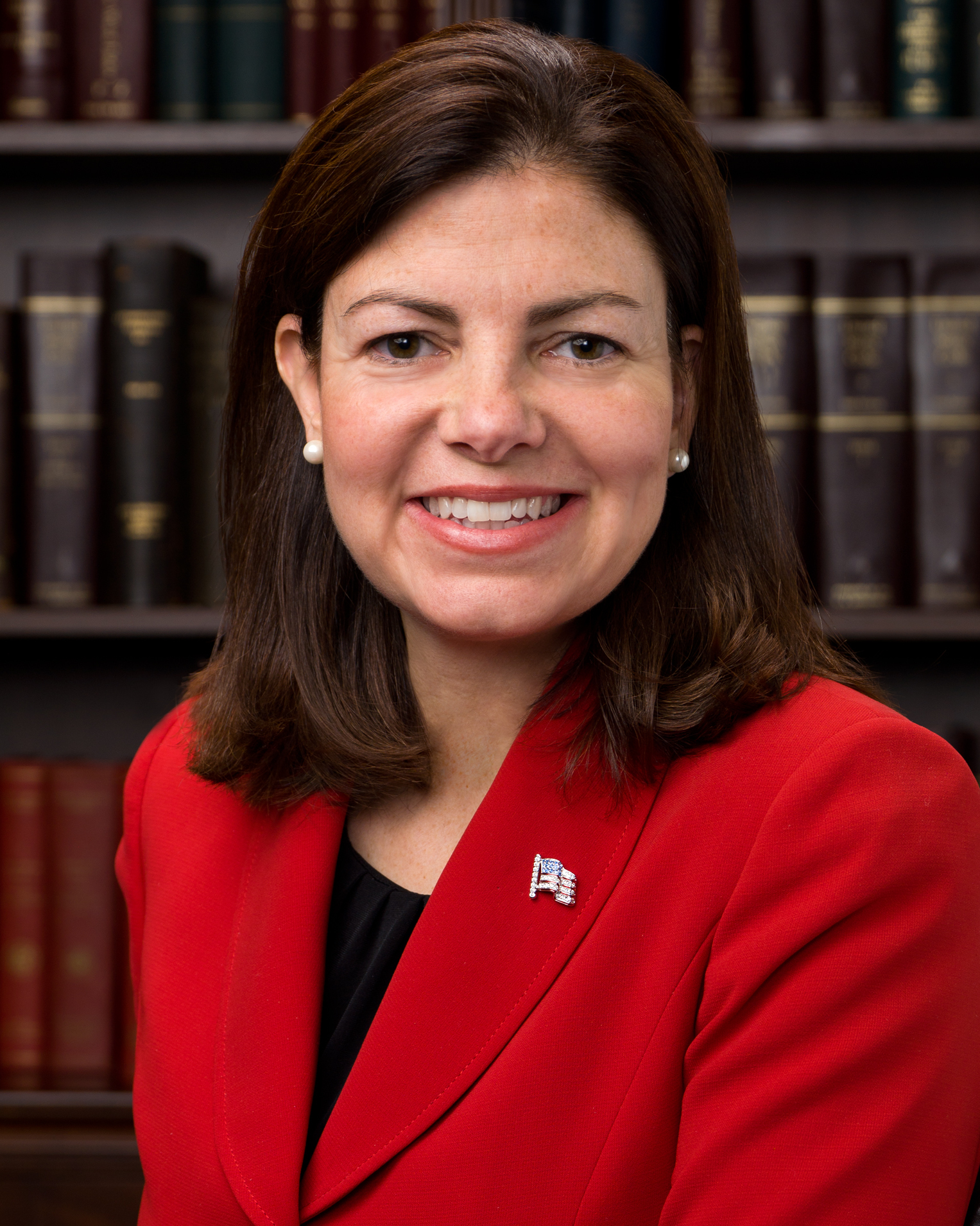
Kelly Ayotte

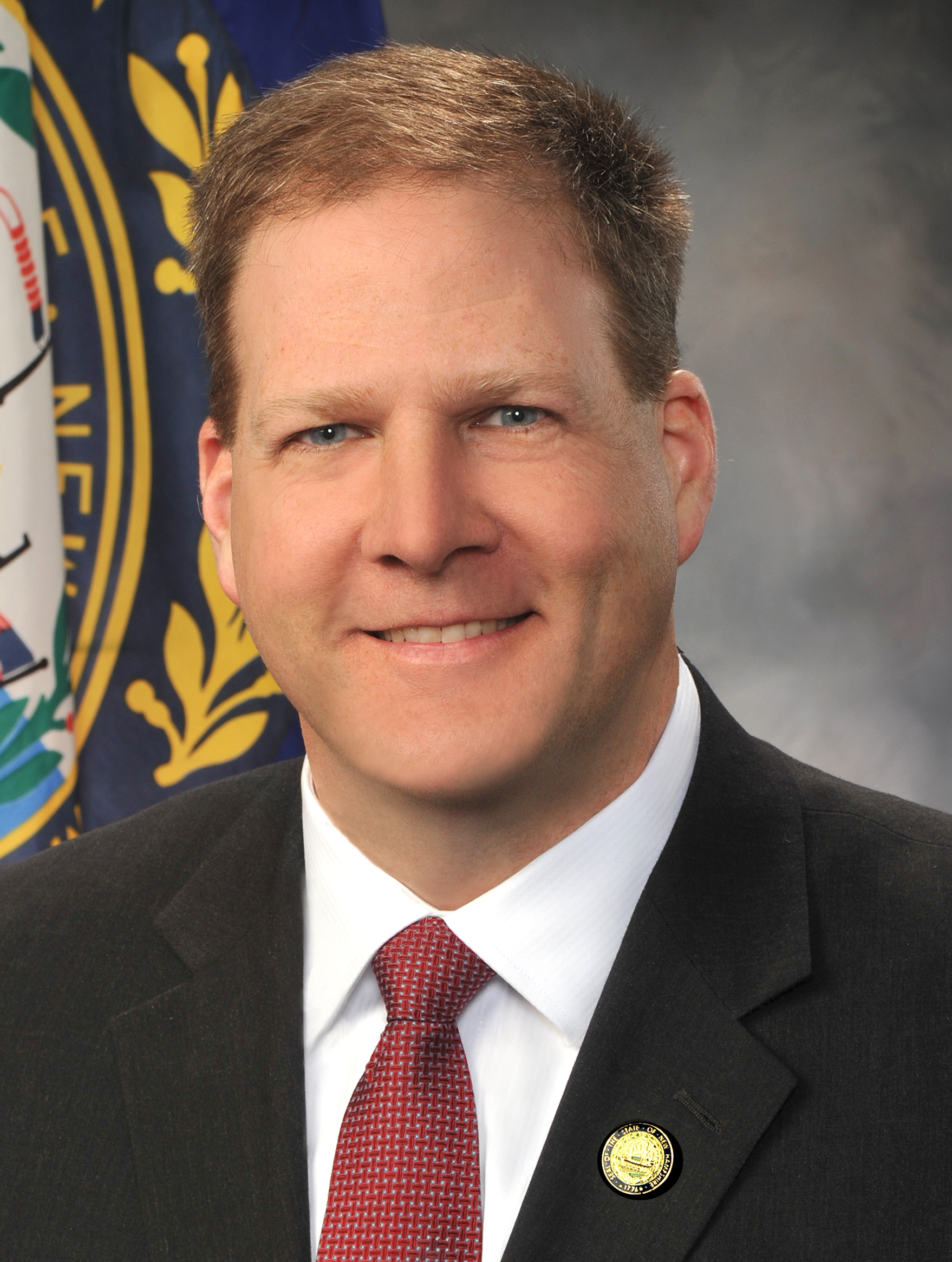
Chris Sununu

Republicans have a state government trifecta in New Hampshire, as it holds the Governorship and majorities in both state legislative chambers.

=== Members of Congress ===
==== U.S. Senate ====
- None

Both of New Hampshire's U.S. Senate seats have been held by Democrats since 2017. Kelly Ayotte was the last Republican to represent New Hampshire in the U.S. Senate. Elected in 2010, she lost re-election in 2016.

==== U.S. House of Representatives ====
- None

New Hampshire has been represented exclusively in the U.S. Senate by Democrats since 2017. Frank Guinta was the last Republican to represent New Hampshire in the House of Representatives. Re-elected to a non-consecutive second term in 2014, Guinta was defeated again by Carol Shea-Porter in 2016, the fourth consecutive election where they faced each other (Guinta had previously unseated Shea-Porter in 2010 but lost in their 2012 rematch).

=== State government ===
- Governor: Kelly Ayotte
- Senate Leader: Sharon Carson
- House Leader: Sherman Packard

== Executive committee ==
- Chair: Scott Maltzie
- Vice Chair: Ken Hilton
- National Committeewoman: Mary Jane Beauregard
- National Committeeman: Bill O'Brien
- Treasurer: Paul Schibbelhute
- Assistant Treasurer: Kate Day
- Secretary: Jane Lane
- Assistant Secretary: Kimberly Allan

== Former chairpersons ==
- Paul Callaghan (Disputed)
- Fergus Cullen
- Stephen Duprey
- Jeanie Forrester
- Warren Henderson
- Jennifer Horn — 2014–2017
- Shirley Hodgdon
- William Johnson
- Jack Kimball
- Wayne MacDonald
- Jim MacEachern
- Jayne Millerick
- Wayne Semprini
- John Stabile
- John H. Sununu 2009–2011
- Nancy Sununu
