= Stephen Duprey =

American politician

Chair of the New Hampshire Republican State Committee
- In office 1997–2001
- Succeeded by: Chris Ager

Member of the New Hampshire House of Representatives from the 2nd Carroll district
- In office December 6, 1972 – December 1, 1976
- Preceded by: Guy H. Lagroe
- Succeeded by: M. Susan Found

Personal details
- Party: Republican
- Education: New College of Florida (BA); Cornell University (JD)

Stephen Duprey was a prominent figure in New Hampshire Republican politics and a Republican National Committee member from Concord, New Hampshire.

== Political career ==
In 1972, Duprey was elected to the New Hampshire Legislature and became the country's youngest state representative at age 19. Duprey later served as chair of the New Hampshire Republican Party for four terms between 1992 and 1995, and 1997–2001. In January 2020, he resigned after being defeated by Hillsborough County Republican Chair and conservative activist Chris Ager. Duprey and his wife, Susan Duprey have participated in 30 campaigns since 1970.

A moderate Republican, Duprey supports legalized abortion. He endorsed Joe Biden for President of the United States in the 2020 General Election.

== Personal life ==
Duprey is a graduate of Cornell Law School. His wife Susan Duprey is a graduate of Northeastern University School of Law. They have three children.

In 2010, Duprey was named business leader of the year by the Greater Concord Chamber of Congress.

New Hampshire House of Representatives
Preceded by Guy H. Lagroe	Member of the New Hampshire House of Representatives from the 2nd Carroll district 1972–1976; Served alongside: Esther M. Davis, Grace N. Cox, Howard C. Dickinson, Clayton W. Towle	Succeeded by M. Susan Found
