= Bridges House =

Historic house in New Hampshire, United States

- U.S. National Register of Historic Places
- NH State Register of Historic Places
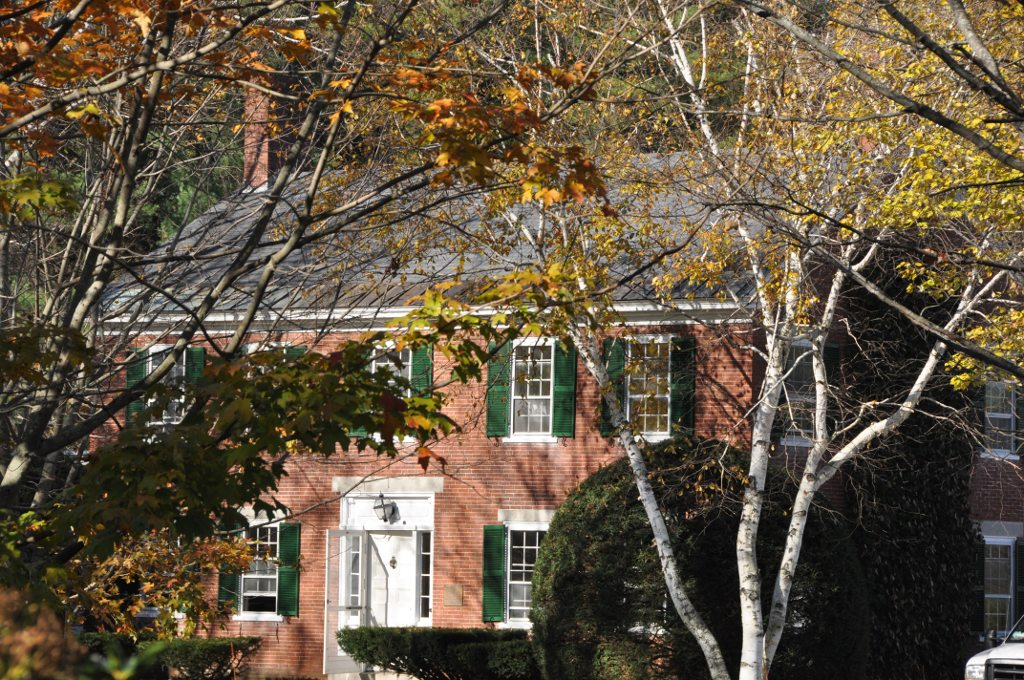

- Location within New Hampshire Location within the United States
- Location: 21 Mountain Rd., Concord, New Hampshire
- Coordinates: 43°14′20″N 71°32′16″W
- Area: 11 acres (4.5 ha)
- Built: ca. 1835
- Architect: Graham, Charles
- Architectural style: Greek Revival, Georgian
- NRHP reference No.: 05001444

Significant dates
- Added to NRHP: December 22, 2005
- Designated NHSRHP: July 25, 2005

Bridges House is the official residence of the governor of New Hampshire and their family. Located at 21 Mountain Road in Concord, the capital of New Hampshire, it has served as the governor's official residence since 1969. Built in 1836, it was listed on the National Register of Historic Places in December 2005, and the New Hampshire State Register of Historic Places in July of the same year.

== Description and history ==
The New Hampshire Governor's Mansion is located in a rural-residential setting about 2 miles (3.2 km) north of downtown Concord, on the west side of Mountain Road (New Hampshire Route 132) north of the East Concord exit from Interstate 93. It is set on eleven landscaped acres, with views toward downtown Concord, Rattlesnake Hill, and the Merrimack River valley. The house is a 2 1/2 story brick building, with a side gable roof and end chimneys. It is oriented facing south, with a five-bay front facade. The main entrance is at the center, flanked by sidelight windows and topped by an entablature and granite lintel. Windows are set in rectangular openings, with granite sills, and granite lintels on the first-floor windows. The street-facing east facade has a pedimented brick gable with a deep recess at the center and ogee crown moulding along the rake edge.

The house was built by Charles Graham about 1836. It is a particularly early example in the state of Greek Revival architecture executed in brick, a building material that was only then beginning to come into wider use for home construction in central New Hampshire. Styles Bridges, governor of New Hampshire (1935–37) and U.S. senator for 25 years thereafter, lived in the house from 1946 until his death. Bequeathed to the state upon the death of his widow Doloris Bridges, in 1969 it became the governor's official residence.

During the 1980s, New Hampshire First Lady Nancy Sununu oversaw the first major renovations in the mansion's history.

Not all governors live in the mansion during their tenure. Recent examples include John Lynch, a resident of nearby Hopkinton, and Maggie Hassan, a resident of Exeter, who resided instead on the campus of Phillips Exeter Academy where her husband, Thomas Hassan, served as principal.

== See also ==
- National Register of Historic Places listings in Merrimack County, New Hampshire
- New Hampshire Historical Marker No. 67: Bridges House-Governor's Residence
- Warren Brown (politician) (1836–1919), who constructed a house in North Hampton, New Hampshire, colloquially known as "the Governor's mansion"
