= Josiah Bartlett Center for Public Policy =

Free market think tank in New Hampshire, USA

- Established: 1992
- Focus: State and local public policy issues in New Hampshire
- President: Drew Cline
- Chair: James Sununu
- Budget: Revenue: $224,000; Expenses: $188,000 (FYE December 2023)
- Address: 7 South State St. Concord, NH 03301
- Location: Concord, New Hampshire
- Coordinates: 43.2035°N 71.5366°W
- Website: jbartlett.org

The Josiah Bartlett Center for Public Policy (JBCPP) is a New Hampshire-based free market think tank.

== Mission ==
According to the organization, "The Center has as its core beliefs, individual freedom and responsibility, limited and accountable government, and an appreciation of the role of the free enterprise system. The Center seeks to promote policy that supports these beliefs by providing information, research, and analysis."

== History and leadership ==
The organization was founded in 1993 by Edgar T. Mead Jr. and Emily Mead. Emily Mead served as policy specialist in the George H. W. Bush administration, where John H. Sununu was chief of staff. The current chairman of the Josiah Bartlett Center board is James Sununu, brother of New Hampshire Governor Chris Sununu. In 2017, Sununu announced Drew Cline, former op-ed editor for the New Hampshire Union Leader, as the new president of the center. Governor Sununu has since named Cline to chair the New Hampshire State Board of Education.

Prior chairman of the Center board was John H. Sununu, father of James and Chris. Prior president was Charles Arlinghaus. In November 2016, Arlinghaus was named chief budget adviser for then New Hampshire Governor-elect Chris Sununu. Arlinghaus advised Sununu on the state budget and public policy during the transition period.

A founding trustee of the Josiah Bartlett Center is Stephen E. Farrar of Guardian Industries in Michigan.

JBCPP has worked to support legislation creating a scholarship tax credit program, which grants tax credits to businesses, and to individuals owing interest and dividend taxes, that donate to nonprofit scholarship organizations that fund low- and middle-income students attending the public, private, or home school of their parents' choice.
