= Nancy Sununu =

American political figure (1939–2024)

First Lady of New Hampshire
- In role January 6, 1983 – January 4, 1989
- Governor: John H. Sununu
- Preceded by: Alfred Roy (acting)
- Succeeded by: Kathleen Gregg

Chair of the New Hampshire Republican Party
- In office 197?–198?

Personal details
- Born: Nancy Hayes; May 27, 1939 Dartmouth, Massachusetts, U.S.
- Died: September 7, 2024 (aged 85) Newfields, New Hampshire
- Party: Republican
- Spouse: John H. Sununu
- Children: Eight, including John and Chris
- Education: Boston University

Nancy Hayes Sununu (May 27, 1939 – September 7, 2024) was an American political figure who served as First Lady of New Hampshire from 1983 to 1989 and as the chair of the New Hampshire Republican Party at the time of the 1980 United States presidential election. She was the wife of John H. Sununu, the 75th governor of New Hampshire and the mother of former U.S. senator John E. Sununu and Chris Sununu, the state's 82nd governor.

== Biography ==
Sununu was born Nancy Hayes in Dartmouth, Massachusetts, on May 27, 1939, but was raised in Brockton, Massachusetts, and Cape Cod. Her parents, Edward and Eleanor (née Christie) Hayes, were teachers of Irish American descent in the Brockton Public Schools system. She received her bachelor's degree from Boston University. She met and married John H. Sununu while she was attending Boston University and he was a college student at the Massachusetts Institute of Technology (MIT). The couple had eight children: Catherine, Elizabeth, Christina, John, Michael, James, Christopher and Peter. In 1970, Sununu moved to Salem, New Hampshire, with her family.

Nancy Sununu, together with her family, rose through the ranks of the New Hampshire Republican Party during the 1970s to became Chair of the New Hampshire Republican State Committee, the leader of the state party. Her chairmanship of the New Hampshire GOP coincided with the landmark 1980 United States presidential election, in which Ronald Reagan was elected President of the United States following his victory in the 1980 New Hampshire Republican presidential primary earlier that year.

Sununu served as the first lady of New Hampshire 1983 until 1989 during her husband's tenure as governor. During her time, First Lady Sununu oversaw and completed the first major renovation of the Bridges House since it became the state's official gubernatorial residence. Nancy Sununu also established a foundation to fund sabbaticals for public school teachers.

Sununu later served as the project director of the Republican Governors Association and the vice president of the Republican Woman's Federal Forum. She also served the board of trustees at Rivier University, a Catholic college in Nashua, New Hampshire, and chair of the Salem School District in Salem, New Hampshire. She was awarded honorary doctorates from St. John's University, St. Thomas Aquinas College, and Iona College for her work in education.

Sununu died from Alzheimer's disease on September 7, 2024, at the age of 85. Her funeral was held at St. Theresa Catholic Church in Rye Beach, New Hampshire, on September 13, 2024, and was buried in the Pine Grove Cemetery in Salem, New Hampshire.
