= 1984 New Hampshire gubernatorial election =

- November 6, 1984
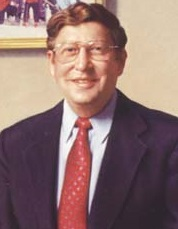

Nominee	John H. Sununu	Chris Spirou
Party	Republican	Democratic
Popular vote	256,574	127,156
Percentage	66.86%	33.14%
- Sununu: 50–60% 60–70% 70–80% 80–90% >90% Spirou: 50–60% 80–90% >90%
Governor before election
John H. Sununu
Republican
Elected Governor
John H. Sununu
Republican

The 1984 New Hampshire gubernatorial election took place on November 6, 1984. Incumbent Governor John Sununu was re-elected to a second term in office.

== Election results ==
1984 New Hampshire gubernatorial election
Party	Candidate	Votes	%	±%
Republican	John H. Sununu (incumbent)	256,574	66.86%	
Democratic	Chris Spirou	127,156	33.14%	
Republican hold		Swing		
