= New Hampshire's 2nd State Senate district =

American legislative district

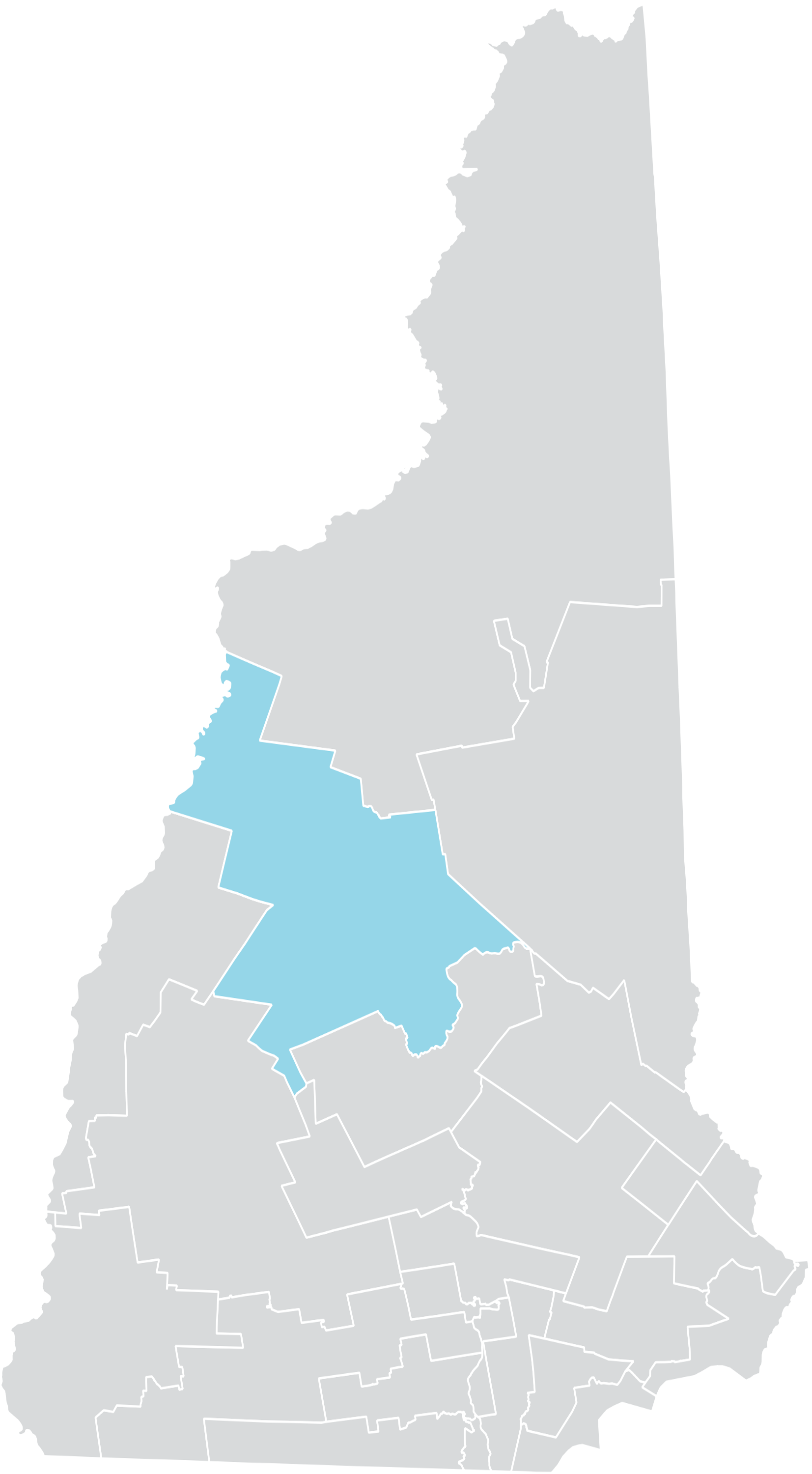
Senator
Timothy Lang Sr. R–Sanbornton
- Registration: 30.3% Republican; 24.3% Democratic; 45.4% No party preference
- Demographics: 94.2% White; 0.7% Black; 1.3% Hispanic; 1.7% Asian
- Population (2019) • Citizens of voting age: 53,753; 44,130

New Hampshire's 2nd State Senate district is one of 24 districts in the New Hampshire Senate. It has been represented by Republican Timothy Lang Sr. of Sanbornton since 2022.

== Geography ==
District 2 covers parts of Belknap, Carroll, and Grafton Counties in the geographic center of the state. The district includes the city of Laconia and the towns of Belmont, Center Harbor, Gilford, Meredith, New Hampton, Sanbornton, and Tilton in Belknap County; the town of Sandwich in Carroll County; and the towns of Ashland, Campton, Holderness, and Thornton in Grafton County.

The district is split between New Hampshire's 1st congressional district and New Hampshire's 2nd congressional district.

== Recent election results ==
=== 2024 ===
2024 New Hampshire State Senate election, District 2
Party	Candidate	Votes	%
Republican	Timothy Lang Sr. (Incumbent)	20,117	58.28
Democratic	Carlos Cardona	14,372	41.64
Write-in		28	0.08
Total votes		34,517	100.0
Republican hold			

=== 2022 ===
2022 New Hampshire State Senate election, District 2
Primary election
Party	Candidate	Votes	%
Republican	Timothy Lang Sr.	3,485	44.7
Republican	David DeVoy	3,149	40.4
Republican	John Plumer	1,169	15.0
Total votes		7,803	100
General election
Republican	Timothy Lang Sr.	15,321	56.0
Democratic	Kate Miller	12,038	44.0
Total votes		27,359	100
Republican hold			

Elections prior to 2022 were held under different district lines.

== Historical election results ==
=== 2020 ===
2020 New Hampshire State Senate election, District 2
Primary election
Party	Candidate	Votes	%
Republican	Bob Giuda (incumbent)	5,582	80.4
Republican	David DeVoy II	1,352	19.5
Total votes		6,947	100
General election
Republican	Bob Giuda (incumbent)	17,661	55.8
Democratic	Bill Bolton	13,974	44.2
Total votes		31,635	100
Republican hold			

=== 2018 ===
2018 New Hampshire State Senate election, District 2
Party	Candidate	Votes	%
Republican	Bob Giuda (incumbent)	12,127	51.6
Democratic	Bill Bolton	11,376	48.4
Total votes		23,503	100
Republican hold			

=== 2016 ===
2016 New Hampshire State Senate election, District 2
Primary election
Party	Candidate	Votes	%
Republican	Bob Giuda	2,972	54.2
Republican	Brian Gallagher	2,514	45.8
Total votes		5,486	100
General election
Republican	Bob Giuda	15,546	54.0
Democratic	Charlie Chandler	13,244	46.0
Total votes		28,790	100
Republican hold			

=== 2014 ===
2014 New Hampshire State Senate election, District 2
Primary election
Party	Candidate	Votes	%
Republican	Jeanie Forrester (incumbent)	4,180	78.7
Republican	Timothy Condon	1,133	21.3
Total votes		5,313	100
General election
Republican	Jeanie Forrester (incumbent)	12,657	62.7
Democratic	Carolyn Mello	7,521	37.3
Total votes		20,178	100
Republican hold			

=== 2012 ===
2012 New Hampshire State Senate election, District 2
Party	Candidate	Votes	%
Republican	Jeanie Forrester (incumbent)	14,943	54.1
Democratic	Robert Lamb, Jr.	12,680	45.9
Total votes		27,623	100
Republican hold			

=== Federal and statewide results ===
Year	Office	Results
2020	President	Biden 49.3% – 48.9%
2020	Senate	Shaheen 53.3% – 44.0%
2020	Governor	Sununu 67.0 – 31.2%
2016	President	Trump 50.4 – 44.0%
2016	Senate	Ayotte 50.0 – 45.5%
2016	Governor	Sununu 49.0 – 46.0%
2014	Senate	Shaheen 52.9 – 47.1%
2014	Governor	Hassan 51.7 – 48.3%
2012	President	Obama 52.5 – 45.9%
2012	Governor	Hassan 54.3 – 42.1%
