= VMA-133 =

Marine Attack Squadron 133
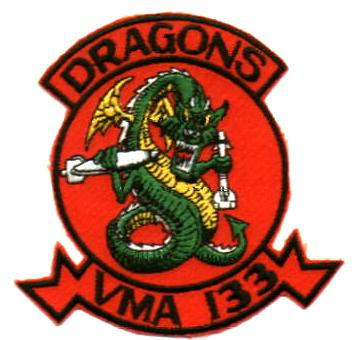
- VMA-133 Insignia
- Active: 1 May 1943 – 1 August 1945; 15 April 1958 – 30 September 1992
- Allegiance: United States of America
- Branch: United States Marine Corps
- Type: Fighter squadron
- Role: Close air support Air interdiction
- Nicknames: Dragons; Flying Eggbeaters (WWII); Golden Gaters (Vietnam Era)
- Tail Code: ME
- Engagements: World War II; Bougainville campaign (1943–45); Philippines campaign (1944–45)

Aircraft flown
- Attack: Douglas A-4 Skyhawk
- Bomber: Grumman TBF Avenger

Marine Attack Squadron 133 (VMA-133) was a reserve A-4 Skyhawk fighter squadron in the United States Marine Corps. Originally known as VMSB-133, the squadron saw combat during the World War II at Bougainville and the Philippines. Following the war, the squadron became part of the Marine Forces Reserve. Also known as the "Dragons", VMA-133 was part of Marine Aircraft Group 42 of the 4th Marine Aircraft Wing and was based out of Naval Air Station Alameda, California. The squadron was deactivated in 1992 as part of the post Cold War drawdown of the U.S. Military.

== History ==
=== World War II ===
Marine Scout Bombing Squadron 133 (VMSB-133) was commissioned on May 1, 1943, at Marine Corps Air Station El Toro, California. After training over the summer the squadron departed for Hawaii and arrived at Marine Corps Air Station Ewa on September 9, 1943. From Ewa, the squadron was split into two sections with one heading to Johnston Atoll and the other to Palmyra Atoll for six months of anti-submarine patrols. Following these tours, the squadron returned to MCAS Ewa only to leave again on June 25, 1944, bound for Torokina on the island of Bougainville. During October and November 1944, the squadron carried out strikes against targets on Bougainville and New Britain.

After two months of travelling, VMSB-133 arrived at Lingayen Gulf in the Philippines after the invasion to recapture the area. It remained there until April 21, 1945, when it moved to Mindanao to provide close air support for the United States Army's 24th and 31st Infantry Regiments as they cleared the island. Through June and July 1945, the squadron continued to attack targets in the vicinity of Sarangani Bay in preparation for a planned invasion.

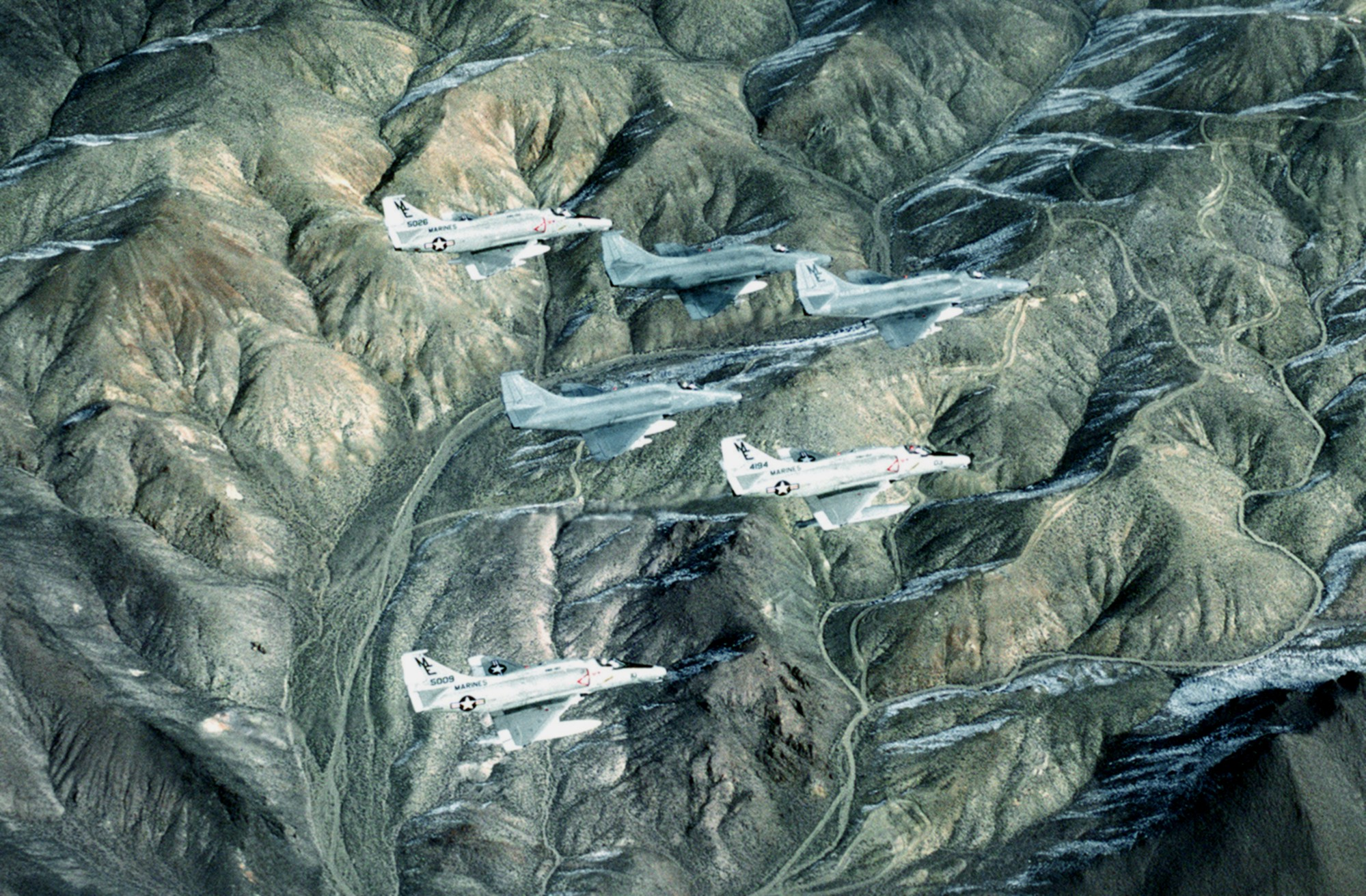
VMA-133 A-4Fs in flight near NAS Fallon, 1982.

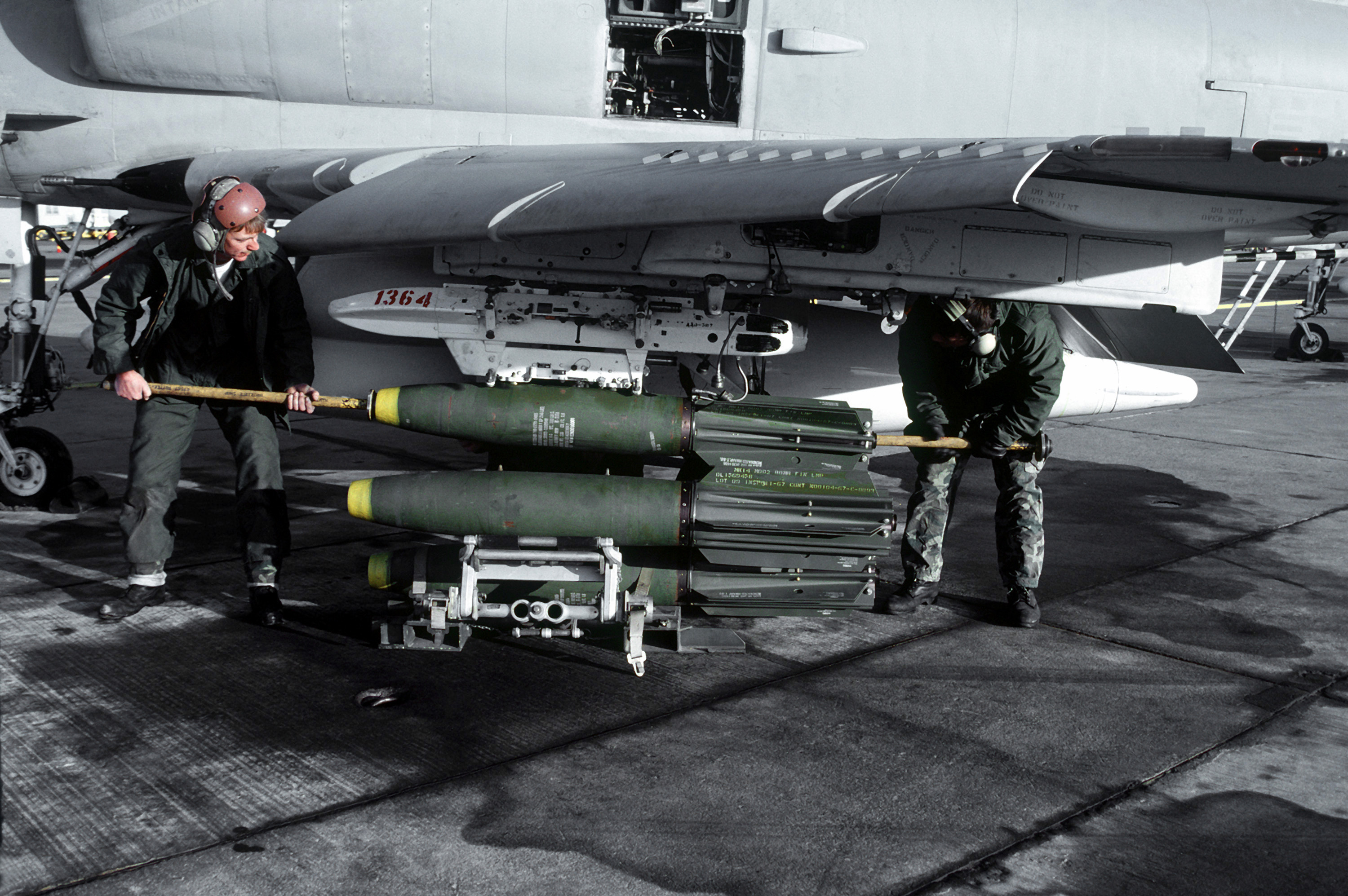
Crewmen loading Mk-81 bombs on to an A-4F from VMA-133.

The squadron was decommissioned on August 1, 1945, at Malabang, Mindanao.

=== Reserve years ===
On 15 April 1958 the squadron was reactivated as part of the Marine Air Reserve and was based out of Naval Air Station Oakland, California. In July 1961 they moved to Naval Air Station Alameda, CA. In 1962 they gained their final designation of Marine Attack Squadron 133 as they began to transition to the Douglas A-4 Skyhawk. The squadron was a part of Marine Aircraft Group 42 and the 4th Marine Aircraft Wing however they were deactivated on 30 September 1992 as part of the post-Cold War drawdown of the U.S. Military.

== Aircraft losses ==
- May 4, 1944 - Two SBDs collided with an F4U Corsair thirty-three miles from Oahu during training. 1stLt Rollin N. Conwell Jr., SSgt Anthony T. McLaughlin, and SSgt John E. Rapkuski were killed in the collision and two others were injured.
- February 19, 1945 - 2ndLt Donald M. Johnson and PFC Vincent W. Hagalich were killed when their SBD was shot down by Japanese anti-aircraft fire over Manila harbor.
- April 26, 1945 - 1stLt Sidney Kallaway Jr. and Pvt Charles A. Corrao were killed when they were unable to pull out of a dive near the town of Tagloan.
- May 2, 1945 - 1stLt William A. Mayer and Cpl Arthur L. Gabhart Jr. were killed when their SBD crashed near Ising.
- May 2, 1945 - An SBD with 1stLt James L. Ware and Sgt Robert L. Johnson crashed into the trees near Lake Lanao. Both servicemen survived.

== Unit awards ==
A unit citation or commendation is an award bestowed upon an organization for the action cited. Members of the unit who participated in said actions are allowed to wear on their uniforms the awarded unit citation. The VMA-133 has been presented with the following awards:

Streamer	Award	Year(s)	Additional Info
	Navy Unit Commendation Streamer with one Bronze Star		World War II
	Asiatic-Pacific Campaign Streamer with Silver Star		
	World War II Victory Streamer	1941–1945	Pacific War
	Philippine Liberation Medal Streamer	1944–1945	Philippines Campaign (1944–45)
	Philippine Presidential Unit Citation Streamer	1944–1945	Philippines Campaign (1944–45)

== See also ==
- United States Marine Corps Aviation
- List of decommissioned United States Marine Corps aircraft squadrons
