= Jim MacEachern =

American political operative

Chair of the New Hampshire Republican Party
- In office January 25, 2025 – January 23, 2026
- Preceded by: Chris Ager
- Succeeded by: Scott Maltzie

Personal details
- Party: Republican

James "Jim" MacEachern is an American political operative and Republican Party official who served as chairman of the New Hampshire Republican State Committee. He resides in Derry, New Hampshire, and has also served in local government in the town of Derry.

== Political party leadership ==
MacEachern became chair of the New Hampshire Republican State Committee in 2025, leading the state party during a period when Republicans controlled the House of Representatives, Senate, and Executive Council. As chair, he was responsible for party organization, messaging, and electoral strategy for Republican campaigns in the state.

=== Resignation as chair ===
In January 2026, MacEachern announced his resignation as chairman of the New Hampshire Republican State Committee, effective prior to the party's annual meeting. Party officials said Paul Callaghan, a former mayor of Rochester, was expected to succeed him. MacEachern said he was stepping down because the role required more time and attention than he was able to give.

According to New Hampshire Public Radio, MacEachern had been party chairman for less than a year, but was facing allegations he'd had an improper confrontation with a former congressional candidate. MacEachern did not publicly address the specific allegations when announcing his departure.

== Local government ==
MacEachern has also served as a councilor in the town of Derry, New Hampshire, representing residents in municipal government.

Party political offices
Preceded by Chris Ager	Chair of the New Hampshire Republican Party; 2025–2026	Succeeded by Scott Maltzie
