= 1986 New Hampshire gubernatorial election =

- November 4, 1986
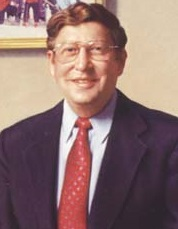

| Nominee | John H. Sununu | Paul McEachern |
| Party | Republican | Democratic |
| Popular vote | 134,824 | 116,142 |
| Percentage | 53.72% | 46.28% |
- Sununu: 50–60% 60–70% 70–80% 80–90% >90% McEachern: 50–60% 60–70% 70–80% >90%
Governor before election
John H. Sununu
Republican
Elected Governor
John H. Sununu
Republican

The 1986 New Hampshire gubernatorial election took place on November 4, 1986. Incumbent Governor John Sununu was re-elected to a third term in office, defeating Paul McEachern, who had defeated Paul M. Gagnon for the Democratic nomination.

== Election results ==
New Hampshire gubernatorial election, 1986
| Party | Candidate | Votes | % | ±% |
|---|---|---|---|---|
| Republican | John H. Sununu (incumbent) | 134,824 | 53.72% | |
| Democratic | Paul McEachern | 116,142 | 46.28% | |
| Republican hold | | Swing | | |
