= Wayne MacDonald =

American politician

State Representative

Member of the New Hampshire House of Representatives from the Rockingham 16th district
- In office December 2022 – Present

Member of the New Hampshire House of Representatives from the Rockingham 5th district
- In office December 3, 2020 – December 2022

Chairman of the New Hampshire Republican State Committee
- In office 2006, 2011 - 2013, 2018 - 2019

Personal details
- Born: September 6, 1954 (age 72) Derry, New Hampshire, U.S.
- Party: Republican
- Education: Saint Anselm College (BA); Rivier University (MBA)

Wayne MacDonald (born September 6, 1954) is an American politician. He serves as a Republican member for the Rockingham 16th district of the New Hampshire House of Representatives. He currently is the chair of the Health, Human Services and Elderly Affairs Committee.

== Personal life ==
MacDonald was born on September 6, 1954, in Derry, New Hampshire. MacDonald resides in Londonderry, New Hampshire. MacDonald attended Londonderry Central School and graduated from Pinkerton Academy in 1972. MacDonald obtained a Bachelors of Art in Political Science from Saint Anselm College in 1976, and a Masters of Business Administration from Rivier University in 1987.

== Political career ==
MacDonald currently serves in the New Hampshire House of Representatives and has since 2020. He currently is the chair of the Health, Human Services and Elderly Affairs Committee. He previously served as vice chair of the Election Law Committee from 2021 to 2022 and as clerk of the Special Committee on Redistricting from 2021 to 2022.

MacDonald served as chairman of the New Hampshire Republican State Committee in 2006, and again from 2011 to 2013, and again from 2018 to 2019 and as vice chairman from 2003 to 2011 and again from 2017 to 2018. MacDonald also served as chairman of the Rockingham County Republican Committee from 1990 to 2001.

MacDonald attended the Republican National Conventions in 1984 as an alternate delegate for Ronald Reagan, in 2000 as a delegate, in 2004 as a delegate for George W. Bush, in 2012 as a delegate.

MacDonald served as a presidential elector in 2000.

MacDonald served as head of the New Hampshire Steering Committee of Christie for President for the 2024 election.
