= Deborah Reynolds =

American politician

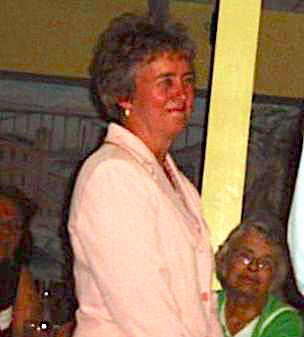

Member of the New Hampshire Senate from the 2nd district
- In office 2006–2010

Personal details
- Party: Democratic
- Spouse: Michael Conklin
- Profession: attorney

Deborah Reynolds was a Democratic member of the New Hampshire Senate, representing the 2nd District from 2006 to 2010. She was Chairman of the New Hampshire Senate Judiciary Committee and served on the Commerce, Labor and Consumer Protection Committee, Rules and Enrolled Bills Committee, and the Ways and Means Committee. She is one of five governor-appointed commissioners on the New Hampshire Commission for Human Rights.

The Senate District 2 comprises Alexandria, Ashland, Bath, Benton, Bridgewater, Bristol, Campton, Canaan, Center Harbor, Dorchester, Easton, Ellsworth, Groton, Haverhill, Hebron, Holderness, Landaff, Lyme, Meredith, Monroe, New Hampton, Orange, Orford, Piermond, Plymouth, Rumney, Sanbornton, Thornton, Warren, Wentworth and Woodstock.
