= Marine Aircraft Group 42 =

Marine Aircraft Training Support Group 42
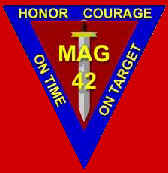
- MAG-42 Insignia
- Active: 1 Jan 1943 – 21 Jun 2008; 2011 - present
- Country: United States
- Allegiance: United States of America
- Branch: United States Marine Corps
- Type: Reserve aviation training support group
- Role: Naval Aviation training
- Part of: 4th Marine Aircraft Wing; Marine Forces Reserve
- Garrison/HQ: Naval Air Station Pensacola
- Motto(s): "On time, on target"
- Engagements: World War II; Operation Enduring Freedom; Operation Iraqi Freedom

Marine Aviation Training Support Group 42 (MATSG-42) is a United States Marine Corps Reserve aviation unit based at Naval Air Station Pensacola, Florida. The mission of MATSG-42 is to provide Marine Corps reserve component augmentation in direct support of active component Navy and Marine Corps aviation activities in order to sustain required levels of qualified Naval Aviators, Naval Flight Officers, Naval Aircrewmen, and enlisted Marine Aviation aircraft maintenance personnel.

As Marine Aircraft Group 42 (MAG-42), it was previously based at the since BRAC'd Naval Air Station Atlanta, Georgia. Due to a re-organization within Marine aviation, MAG-42 was deactivated on 21 June 2008. It was redesignated and reactivated as MATSG-42 on or about 2011 aboard NAS Pensacola.

== History ==
Marine Aircraft Group 42 (MAG-42) was initially commissioned on January 1, 1943, in Naval Air Station North Island, California, as Marine Base Defense Aircraft Group 42, 4th Marine Aircraft Wing. The unit's mission was to provide air defense support for west coast Naval and Marine Corps installations and to conduct airborne search and patrol, transportation, air-sea rescue, and shipping escort operations along the Pacific Coast. By 1944, the unit expanded from a small complement of Marines and two T-6 aircraft to 272 officers, 2,135 enlisted, and 102 SNJ aircraft.

During 1943, the Group became responsible for training Marine aviators for World War II combat operations in the Pacific Theater and relocated to Marine Corps Air Station Santa Barbara in March 1943. In November 1944, the unit was re-designated Marine Aircraft Group 42. Following the war, MAG-42 was re-designated Marine Aircraft Support Group 42 and then deactivated on October 31, 1945.

MAG-42 was reactivated on February 1, 1965, during the Vietnam War. The Air Group consisted of Marine Attack Squadron 133 flying the A-4 Skyhawk and Marine Helicopter Transport Squadron 769 flying the H-34 helicopter. In 1971, Marine Helicopter Squadron 769 was redesignated to Marine Heavy Helicopter Squadron 769 and transitioned to the CH-53 Sea Stallion helicopter.

Following the collapse of the USSR, the stunning military success in the Persian Gulf War, and subsequent draw down of U.S. Department of Defense forces, the Department of the Navy developed a "Total Force" concept redefining the role of the Reserve Component to meet national emerging global security requirements. MAG-42 was reorganized and relocated to NAS Atlanta on the Dobbins Air Reserve Base om Marietta, Georgia on June 10, 1992, in support of the Marine Corps Total Force Concept, "the integration of active and reserve components into the Total Force, a cohesive team shaped for joint operations to meet national needs and global challenges." The reorganization resulted in a mirror image of Reserve and Active Marine Ground Task Force units and attachment of Marine Attack Helicopter Squadron 773 flying the AH-1J Cobra, Marine Observation Squadron 4 flying the OV-10D aircraft, Marine Light Helicopter Squadron 767 flying the UH-1N helicopter, Marine Medium Helicopter Squadron 774 flying the CH-46 helicopter, and Marine Fighter Attack Squadron 142 (VMFA-142) flying the F/A-18A Hornet.

On October 1, 1994, the Marine Light Attack and Marine Attack Squadrons was re-designated Marine Light Attack Squadron 773 (HMLA-773) at Atlanta and HMLA-773 Detachment A at New Orleans, LA. These combat tested units now reflect their counterparts in the Fleet Marine Force and combine the capabilities of the AH-1W Super Cobra Attack helicopter and the UH-1N Utility helicopter. This combat proven organization is now resident in the Reserve Force and underpins the Total Force Concept. In addition, VMFA-142 integrated the Department of the Navy TACAIR Integration (TAI) concept which integrates USMC and USN tactical jets into USN carrier air wings.

The total force-in-readiness mission is conducted by MAG-42 as a result of extensive training in many varied locations throughout the nation as well as deployments throughout the world. MAG-42 has participated in counter drug operations in several Eastern Caribbean countries in 1995 and 1996. Both marijuana eradication and drug-transit interdiction have accounted for more than $20 billion worth of illegal substances eradicated in these operations.

== See also ==
- List of United States Marine Corps aircraft groups
- List of United States Marine Corps aircraft squadrons
