= Fergus Cullen =

Fergus Cullen is a Republican political figure from New Hampshire and the principal of the consulting firm Fergus Cullen Communications. He is a former chairman of the New Hampshire Republican State Committee.

== Biography ==
Cullen was born and grew up in New Hampshire, and moved to Connecticut to attend Yale University. While a student there, he wrote an op-ed in the New Haven Register criticizing proposals to raise gas taxes, which caught the attention of someone working on John G. Rowland's 1994 gubernatorial campaign. After he graduated, he became interested in Republican politics in Connecticut, and worked on multiple Republican campaigns there, including Rowland's 1994 and 1998 bids for governor.

He was later elected chairman of the New Hampshire Republican State Committee, a position he held from 2007 to 2008. When he was elected he was 34 years old, making him the youngest state party chairman in the history of the United States at the time. His term as chairman included the 2008 New Hampshire primary, the first primary in the 2008 United States presidential election. He later served as the executive director of the Yankee Institute for Public Policy for five years, beginning in 2009. He is the author of a book about the New Hampshire primary, entitled Granite Steps, and the founder of the immigration reform advocacy group Americans By Choice.

== Views in the 2016 election ==
Cullen endorsed John Kasich in the 2016 New Hampshire primary several weeks before it took place. He was highly critical of Donald Trump during the 2016 Republican Party primaries.

== Personal life ==
Cullen is a competitive distance runner. He and his wife, Jenny, have three children.
