= Hog reeve =

Person who deals with stray swine

A hog reeve or hogreeve, hog-reeve, hog constable is a Colonial New England term for a person charged with the prevention or appraising of damages by stray swine. Wandering domestic pigs were a problem to the community, due to the extent of damage they could do to gardens and crops by rooting.

The owners of hogs were responsible for yoking and placing rings in their noses. If the hogs got loose and became a nuisance in the community, one or more of the men assigned as a hog reeve would be responsible for capturing and impounding the animal. If the animal did not have a ring in its nose, then the reeve was responsible for performing the necessary chore for the owner, who could legally be charged a small fee for the service. There were punishments and fines established for failing to yoke hogs and to control animals. In an 1865 Act of the General Assembly of Prince Edward Island, Canada, owners were required to pay 4 shillings per head to reclaim their animals, and hogreeves were permitted to sell unclaimed swine at public auction 48 hours after written notices were posted in public places in that district. In New England, the owner of a stray hog in the town of Chelsea, Massachusetts would be charged 10 shillings per hog.

The office originated in Anglo-Saxon England, when hogreeves would be stationed at the doors of cathedrals during services to prevent swine from entering the church. The office of hogreeve was among the earliest elected offices to exist in colonial North America; the earliest rights specifically granted to towns in New England concerned the herding of swine, cattle, and the regulation of fences and common fields. The field driver held similar duties but was not restricted to swine. The hogreeve was a historical municipal official in Nova Scotia and Prince Edward Island in Canada; it was also listed as an elected office in early New Hampshire township records.

In Massachusetts, towns could vote to stop enforcement of the state law against letting swine run loose; many towns did so, leaving their hog reeves with nothing to do. As a result, it became a joke to elect a man hog reeve during the first year of his marriage.

== See also ==
- Reeve
- Sheriff
