= John H. Sununu =

American politician (born 1939)

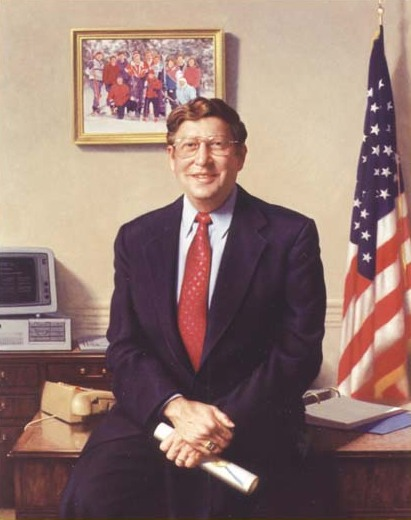
- Portrait by Richard Whitney

Chair of the New Hampshire Republican Party
- In office January 17, 2009 – January 22, 2011
- Preceded by: Fergus Cullen
- Succeeded by: Jack Kimball

14th White House Chief of Staff
- In office January 20, 1989 – December 15, 1991
- President: George H. W. Bush
- Deputy: Andrew Card
- Preceded by: Ken Duberstein
- Succeeded by: Samuel K. Skinner

75th Governor of New Hampshire
- In office January 6, 1983 – January 4, 1989
- Preceded by: Vesta M. Roy (acting)
- Succeeded by: Judd Gregg

Chair of the National Governors Association
- In office July 28, 1987 – August 9, 1988
- Preceded by: Bill Clinton
- Succeeded by: Gerald Baliles

Member of the New Hampshire House of Representatives from the 5th Rockingham district
- In office December 6, 1972 – December 4, 1974
- Preceded by: Multi-member district
- Succeeded by: Multi-member district

Personal details
- Born: John Henry Sununu; July 2, 1939 (age 87) Havana, Republic of Cuba
- Party: Republican
- Spouse: Nancy Hayes (died 2024)
- Children: 8, including John and Chris
- Education: Massachusetts Institute of Technology (BS, MS, PhD)
- Scientific career
- Fields: Mechanical engineering
- Workplaces: Tufts University
- Thesis: Flow of a High Temperature, Variable Viscosity Fluid at Low Reynolds Number (1966)

John Henry Sununu (born July 2, 1939) is a Cuban-born (to Lebanese-Palestinian parents) American politician who served as the 75th governor of New Hampshire from 1983 to 1989 and as the 14th White House chief of staff under President George H. W. Bush from 1989 to 1991.

Born in Cuba to an American father and a Salvadoran mother, he is of Greek, Hispanic, and Lebanese descent, making him the first Arab American, Greek American, and Hispanic American to be governor of New Hampshire and White House chief of staff. He is the father of John E. Sununu, the former United States Senator from New Hampshire, and Christopher Sununu, the former governor of New Hampshire. Sununu was the chairman of the New Hampshire Republican Party from 2009 to 2011.

== Early life and education ==
Sununu was born on July 2, 1939 in Havana while his parents were visiting Cuba on a business trip. He is the son of John Saleh Sununu, an international film distributor, and Victoria Sununu (née Dada). His father's family came to the United States from Lebanon as Greek Orthodox Christians at the turn of the 20th century; his father's ancestry was Greek and Lebanese from Jerusalem and Beirut, respectively. Sununu's father was born in Boston, Massachusetts, while his mother was born in El Salvador. According to Sununu, his maternal ancestors were Greeks who settled in Central America at the turn of the 20th century. He has said that his maternal ancestry makes him "part Greek American and part Hispanic American". Sununu visited Beirut, Lebanon, as a child in the late 1940s. He grew up in New York City and graduated from the La Salle Military Academy on Long Island.

Sununu earned a Bachelor of Science degree in 1961, a Master of Science degree in 1963, and a PhD in 1966 from the Massachusetts Institute of Technology, all in mechanical engineering. He was a member of the Phi Sigma Kappa fraternity.

== Academic career ==
From 1966 to 1982, Sununu taught at Tufts University, where he was an associate professor of mechanical engineering. He was the associate dean of the university's College of Engineering from 1968 to 1973. As of 1988, Sununu retained his title and family tuition benefits from Tufts during an "extremely rare" unpaid six-year leave of absence that coincided with his governorship. He was on the advisory board of the Technology and Policy Program at MIT from 1984 until 1989.

== Political career ==
A Republican, Sununu represented the 5th Rockingham district in the New Hampshire House of Representatives from 1972 to 1974.

Sununu ran for the New Hampshire Senate in 1974 and 1976, but lost the general election both times to Delbert F. Downing. He ran for the Executive Council of New Hampshire in 1978, but lost the general election to Dudley Dudley. He ran for the United States Senate in 1980, but lost the Republican primary to Warren Rudman.

=== Governor of New Hampshire ===
Sununu ran for Governor of New Hampshire in the 1982 election, winning with 51.47% of the vote against incumbent Hugh Gallen. He became New Hampshire's 75th governor on January 6, 1983, and was re-elected in 1984 and 1986 to hold the position for three consecutive terms. He was the first Arab-American governor of New Hampshire. Sununu was chairman of the Coalition of Northeastern Governors, the Republican Governors Association and, in 1987, the National Governors Association.

Sununu angered some when he was the only governor of a U.S. state not to call for repeal of the UN General Assembly Resolution 3379 ("Zionism is racism"). He later reversed his position on this issue and supported the Republicans' pro-Israel 1988 platform.

=== White House chief of staff ===
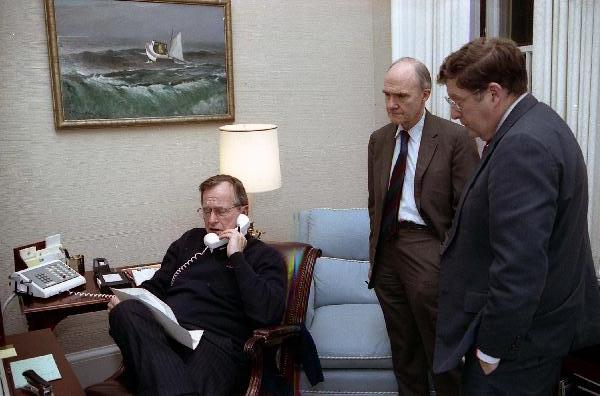
President Bush on the telephone during the United States invasion of Panama with Sununu and Brent Scowcroft on December 20, 1989

Sununu was the first White House chief of staff for George H. W. Bush, holding the position from 1989 to 1991. Time magazine dubbed him "Bush's Bad Cop" on the front cover on May 21, 1990.

Sununu is considered to have engineered Bush's mid-term abandonment of his 1988 campaign promise of "no new taxes". In his report Losing Earth: The Decade We Almost Stopped Climate Change, Nathaniel Rich wrote that in November 1989 Sununu prevented the signing of a 67-nation commitment at the Noordwijk Climate Conference to freeze carbon dioxide emissions, with a reduction of 20 percent by 2005, and singled him out as a force starting coordinated efforts to bewilder the public on the topic of global warming and changing it from an urgent, nonpartisan and unimpeachable issue to a political one. Interviewed as to his involvement in preventing an agreement, he stated: "It couldn't have happened, because, frankly, the leaders in the world at that time were at a stage where they were all looking how to seem like they were supporting the policy without having to make hard commitments that would cost their nations serious resources. Frankly, that's about where we are today."

Sununu recommended David Souter of New Hampshire to President George H. W. Bush for appointment to the Supreme Court of the United States, at the behest of his close friend, then-U.S. senator and fellow New Hampshirite Warren Rudman. The Wall Street Journal described the events leading up to the appointment of the "liberal jurist" in a 2000 editorial, saying Rudman in his "Yankee Republican liberalism" took "pride in recounting how he sold Mr. Souter to gullible White House chief of staff John Sununu as a confirmable conservative. Then they both sold the judge to President Bush, who wanted above all else to avoid a confirmation battle [after Robert Bork]." Rudman wrote in his memoir that he had "suspected all along" that Souter would not "overturn activist liberal precedents." Sununu later said that he had "a lot of disappointment" about Souter's positions on the Court and would have preferred him to be more similar to Justice Antonin Scalia.

At the recommendation of George W. Bush, Sununu resigned his White House post on December 4, 1991. He remained at the White House as Counselor to the President until March 1, 1992.

==== USS Liberty veterans reunion ====
On the 24th anniversary of the USS Liberty incident (in 1991), approximately 50 Liberty survivors, including Captain William McGonagle, were invited to the White House to meet with President George H. W. Bush in a meeting set up by former Congressmen Paul Findley and Pete McCloskey. After waiting for over 2 hours, President Bush waved at them as he passed by in his limousine, but did not meet with them in person. Many of the survivors were reportedly disheartened and disappointed with this. Instead, Sununu and National Security Adviser Brent Scowcroft greeted them. Rear Admiral Thomas A. Brooks, who had spoken out in favor of Liberty survivors previously, presented them with a Presidential Unit Citation that had been signed by President Lyndon B. Johnson but never awarded. Former Chairman of the Joint Chiefs of Staff Admiral Thomas H. Moorer, a longtime Liberty advocate, was also in attendance. This meeting was objected to by the Anti-Defamation League.

==== Conflict-zone mining ====
Sununu is a major shareholder of the Anglo-Asian mining company (holding 9.38%) which stands to profit after Azerbaijan military victories over Nagorno-Karabakh.

==== Expenses controversy ====
As White House chief of staff, Sununu reportedly took personal trips, for skiing and other purposes, and classified them as official, for purposes such as conservation or promoting the Thousand Points of Light. The Washington Post wrote that Sununu's jets "took him to fat-cat Republican fund-raisers, ski lodges, golf resorts and even his dentist in Boston." Sununu had paid the government only $892 for his more than $615,000 worth of military jet travel. Sununu said that his use of the jets was necessary because he had to be near a telephone at all times for reasons of national security. Sununu became the subject of much late-night television humor over the incident. Sununu worsened the situation shortly afterwards when, after leaking rumors of financial difficulties in his family, he traveled to a rare stamp auction at Christie's auction house in New York City from Washington in a government limousine, spending $5,000 on rare stamps. Sununu then sent the car and driver back to Washington unoccupied while he returned on a corporate jet. In one week, 45 newspapers ran editorials on Sununu, nearly all of them critical of his actions. Sununu resigned his White House post on December 4, 1991. Sununu repaid over $47,000 to the government for the flights on the orders of White House counsel C. Boyden Gray, with the help of the Republican Party. However, the reimbursements were at commercial rates, which are about one-tenth the cost of the actual flights; one ski trip to Vail, Colorado alone had cost taxpayers $86,330.

== Other activities ==
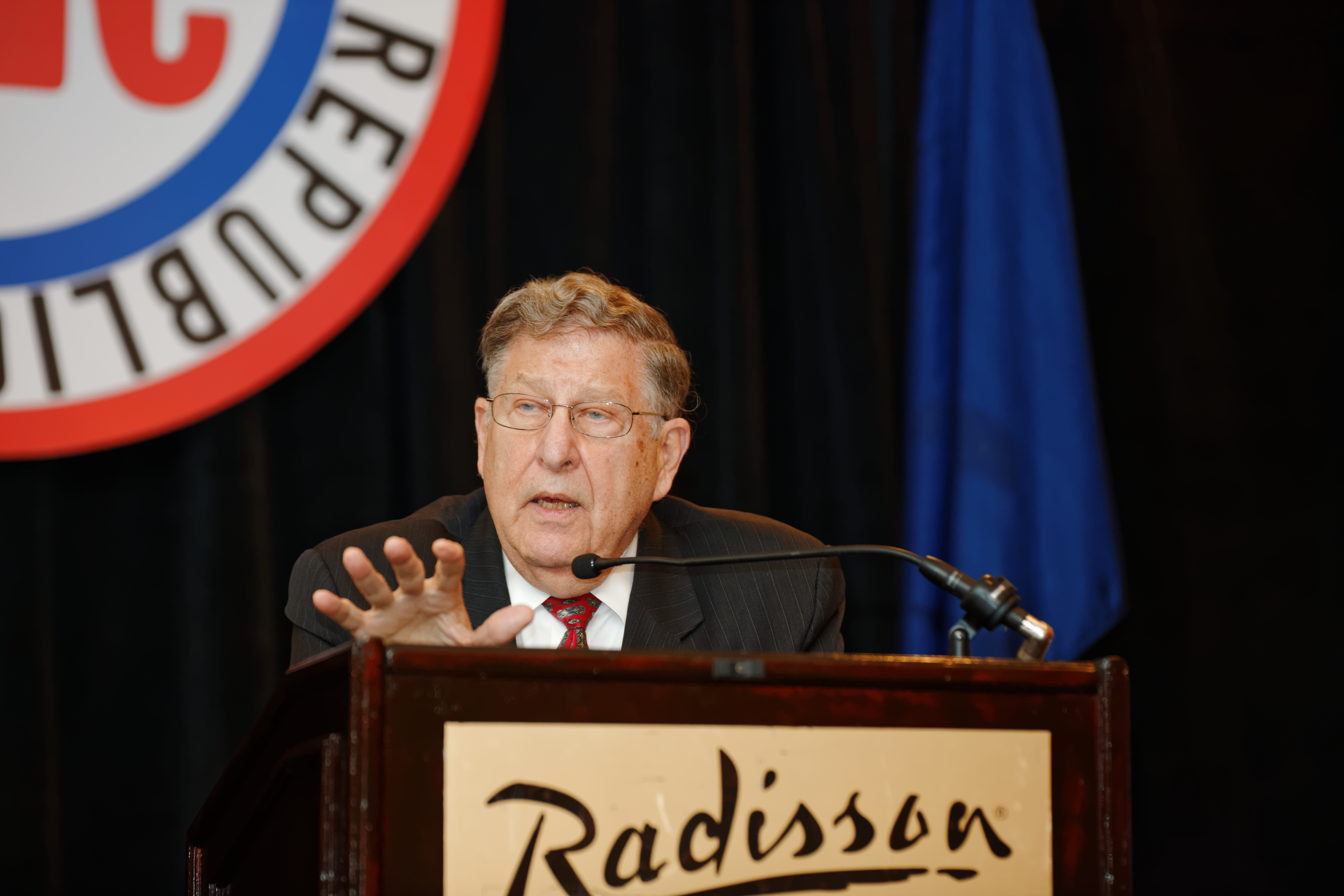
Sununu at the January 23, 2016, First in the Nation Town Hall in Nashua, New Hampshire

Sununu co-hosted CNN's nightly Crossfire from March 1992 until February 1998.

From 1963 until 1983, he was President of JHS Engineering Company and Thermal Research Inc. In addition, he helped establish and worked as chief engineer for Astro Dynamics Inc. from 1960 until 1965.

In 2012, Sununu as a national co-chair for the Mitt Romney presidential campaign made controversial comments directed towards then President Barack Obama calling Obama "un-American". After receiving backlash for the comment, Sununu apologized soon afterwards. A few months later, Sununu again caused controversy for the Romney campaign when he said that the reason he believed former Secretary of State, Colin Powell (a Republican) endorsed President Obama over Romney was because both Powell and Obama are the same race. After the election, Sununu blamed Romney's loss to Obama on Obama's supporters being "dependent" on government programs.

Sununu is president of JHS Associates, Ltd. and a partner in Trinity International Partners, a private financial firm. He is also a member of Honorary Council of Advisors for U.S.-Azerbaijan Chamber of Commerce (USACC).

== Awards and honors ==
He was elected a member of the National Academy of Engineering in 1990 for exceptionally significant creativity in energy systems development, in engineering education, and in integration of technological advances with public policy.

== Personal life ==
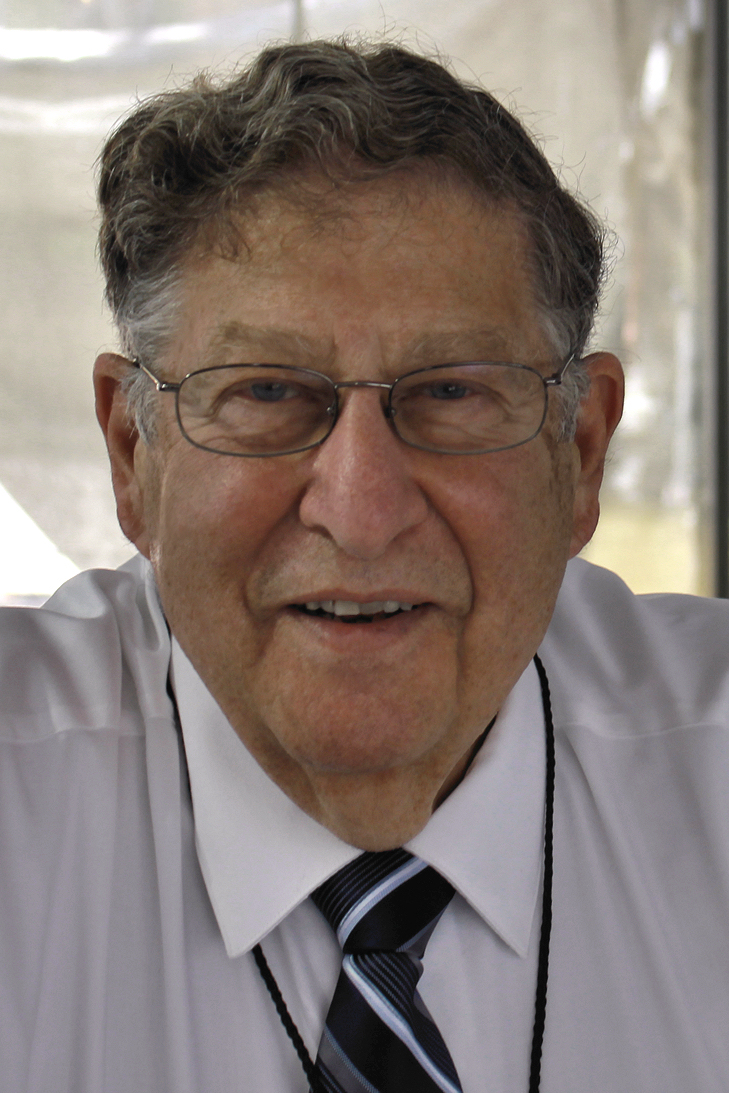
Sununu in 2015

Sununu was married to the former Nancy Hayes, with whom he had eight children, including former U.S. senator John E. Sununu and former governor of New Hampshire Chris Sununu. In recent years, he moved from Salem, New Hampshire, to Hampton Falls, New Hampshire, to be closer to relatives. He and his wife were subsequently elected as the town's honorary hog reeves and poundkeepers. The title is usually given to an unsuspecting newcomer each year.

Sununu's daughter Cathy is the president of the Portsmouth Museum of Art in Portsmouth, New Hampshire.

Sununu is a fluent Spanish speaker.

On September 7, 2024, Nancy Sununu died following a long battle with Alzheimer's disease.

== In popular culture ==
In the 1991 police comedy film The Naked Gun 2½: The Smell of Fear, Sununu is played by Peter Van Norden.

In January 1995, John Sununu made a cameo appearance on the first episode of the Delta Burke CBS sitcom, Women of the House, titled "Miss Sugarbaker Goes to Washington". In the episode, Suzanne Sugarbaker is a guest on the CNN political program Crossfire. Michael Kinsley also appears.

In the 1996 film Mystery Science Theater 3000: The Movie, a clip (from This Island Earth) of a jet plane prompts Tom Servo to quip, "John Sununu goes for a haircut." The joke was a recurring one on the original series, as well. It refers to Sununu’s use of a military jet for personal business while he was Bush I's Chief of Staff.

In the 1996 episode of Space Ghost Coast to Coast, "Glen Campbell", Matt Groening mentions he makes it a point to watch shows having rhyming titles, and after several real show titles, he mentions "Yoo-Hoo, It's John Sununu."

== Political endorsements ==
After the first presidential debate of 2016, Sununu endorsed Donald Trump for President of the United States.

In early January 2024, Sununu endorsed Nikki Haley for the 2024 Republican presidential nomination.

== See also ==
- List of minority governors and lieutenant governors in the United States
- List of United States governors born outside the United States

Party political offices
Preceded by Meldrim Thomson Jr.	Republican nominee for Governor of New Hampshire; 1982, 1984, 1986	Succeeded by Judd Gregg
Preceded by Dick Thornburgh	Chair of the Republican Governors Association; 1985–1986	Succeeded by Tom Kean
Preceded by Fergus Cullen	Chair of the New Hampshire Republican Party; 2009–2011	Succeeded by Jack Kimbal
Political offices
Preceded by Vesta M. Roy; Acting	Governor of New Hampshire; 1983–1989	Succeeded by Judd Gregg
Preceded by Bill Clinton	Chair of the National Governors Association; 1987–1988	Succeeded by Gerald L. Baliles
Preceded by Ken Duberstein	White House Chief of Staff; 1989–1991	Succeeded by Samuel K. Skinner
U.S. order of precedence (ceremonial)
Preceded by Martha McSally as Former U.S. Senator	Order of precedence of the United States; Within New Hampshire	Succeeded by Craig Benson as Former Governor
Preceded by Nikki Haley as Former Governor	Order of precedence of the United States; Outside New Hampshire	Succeeded by Craig Benson as Former Governor
