= List of Hillary Clinton 2016 presidential campaign political endorsements =

This is a list of notable individual politicians and political organizations who publicly indicated support for Hillary Clinton in the 2016 United States presidential election.

Public officials serving below the state level and all other individuals and entities are listed only if they have a separate stand-alone article. Those who indicated their support after Hillary Clinton's presumptive nomination on June 11 are denoted with an asterisk.

== Federal officials and state governors ==
=== Presidents and vice presidents ===
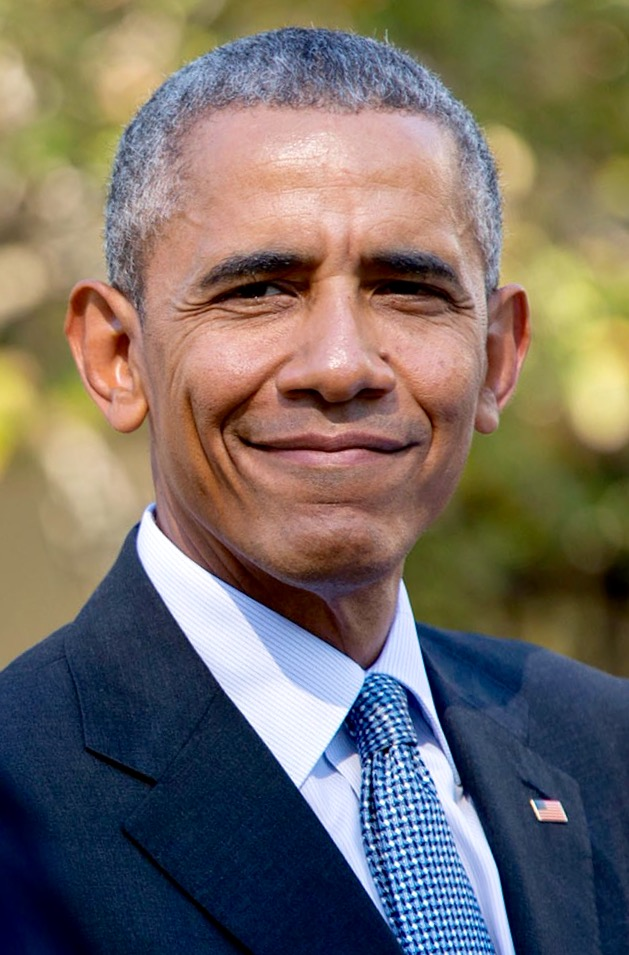
Barack Obama

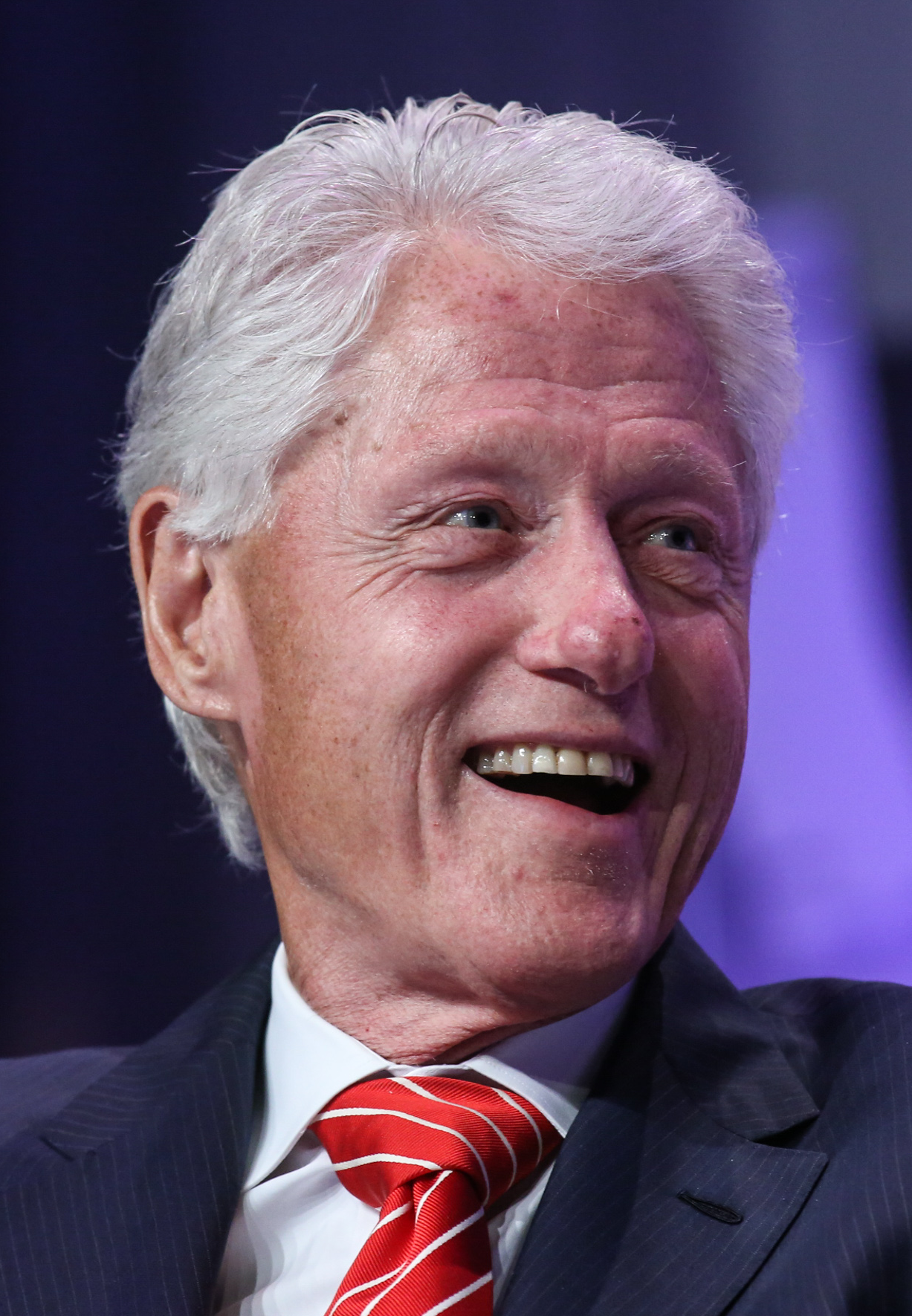
Bill Clinton

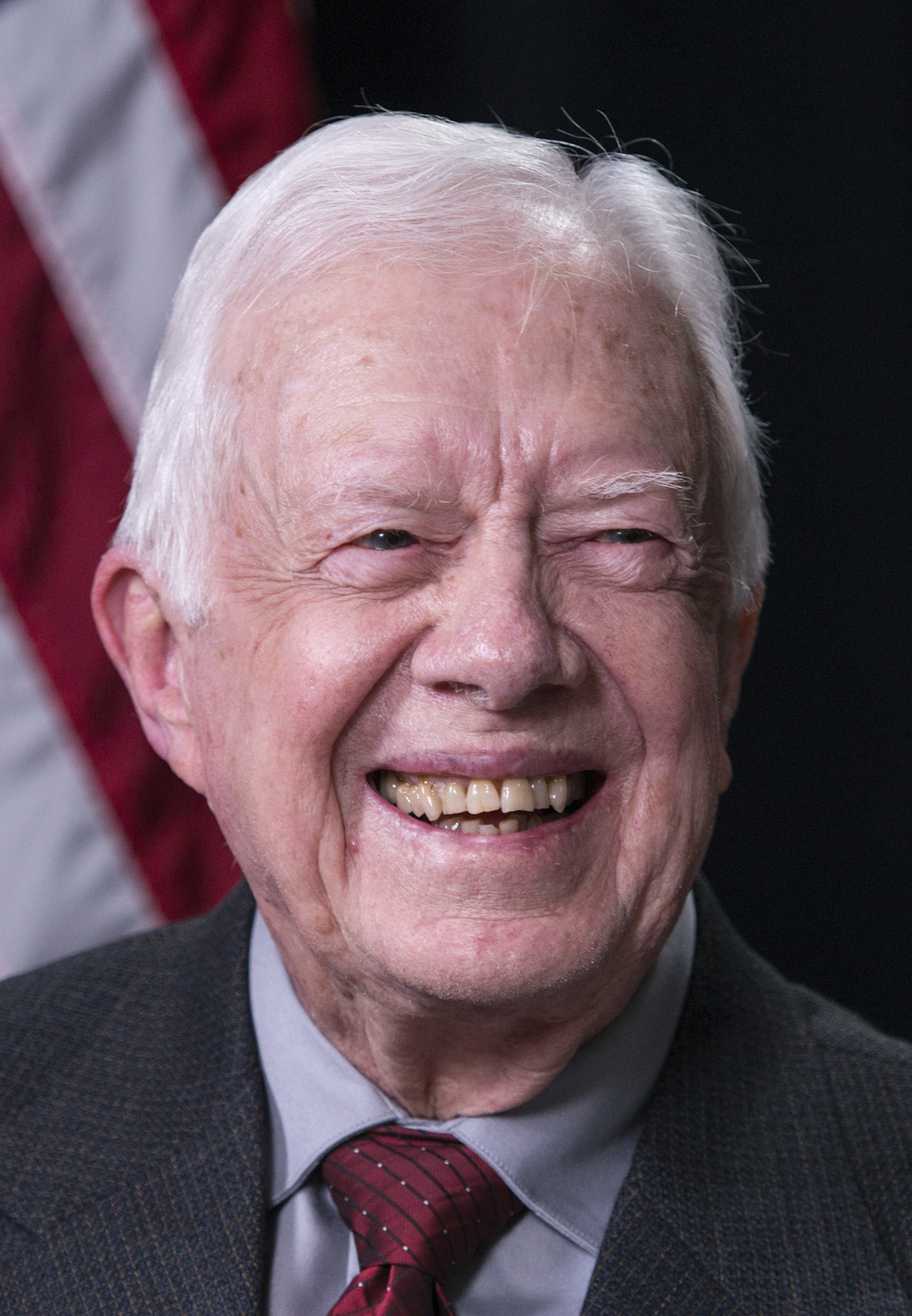
Jimmy Carter

Name	Position	Party	In office	Ref
Jimmy Carter*	39th president	Democratic	1977–1981	(Note: Nobel Prize laureate)
Bill Clinton	42nd president	Democratic	1993–2001	
Barack Obama	44th president	Democratic	2009–2017	
Walter Mondale	42nd vice president	Democratic	1977–1981	
Al Gore	45th vice president	Democratic	1993–2001	
Joe Biden	47th vice president	Democratic	2009–2017	

=== Federal cabinet-level officers ===
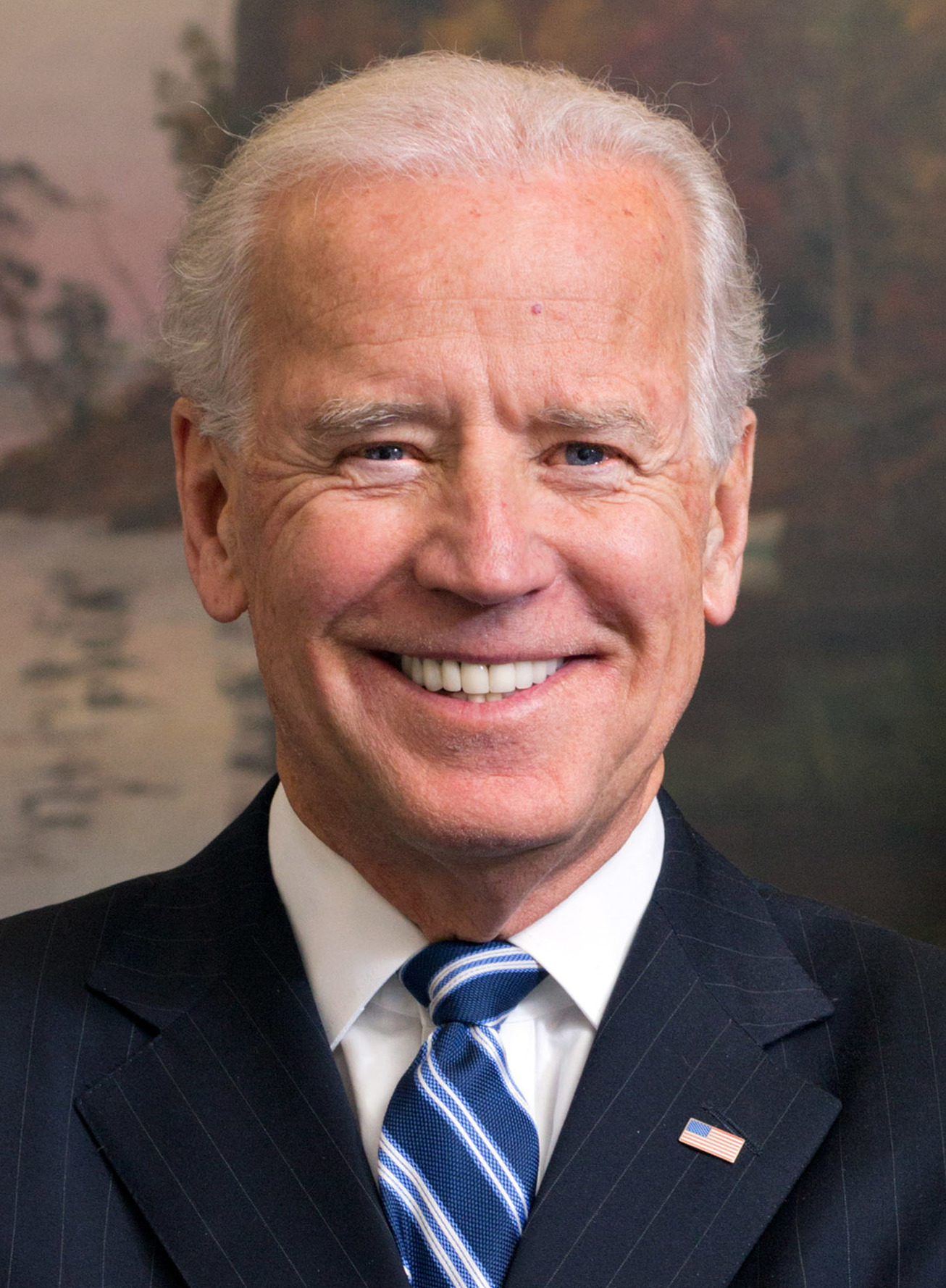
Joe Biden

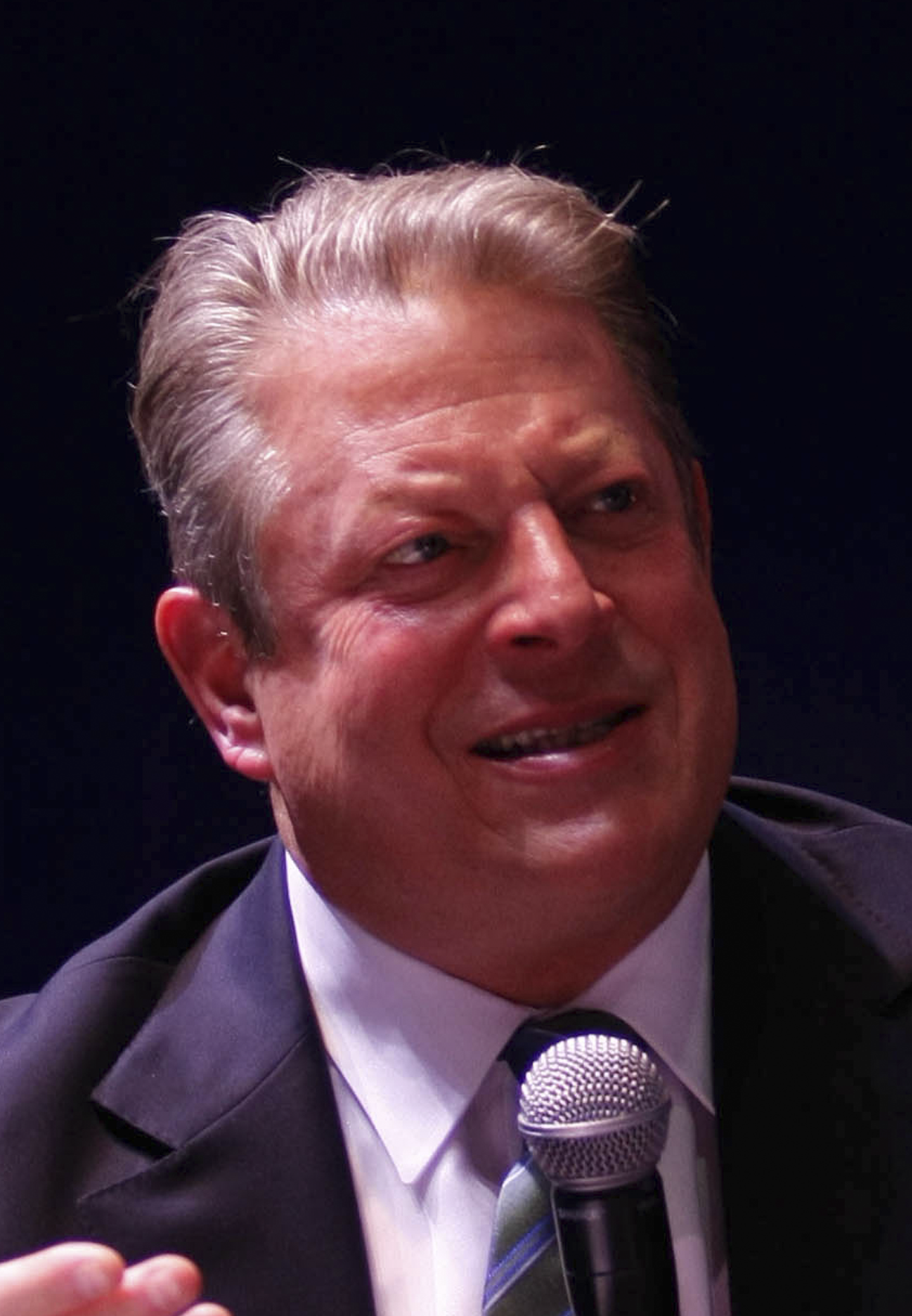
Al Gore

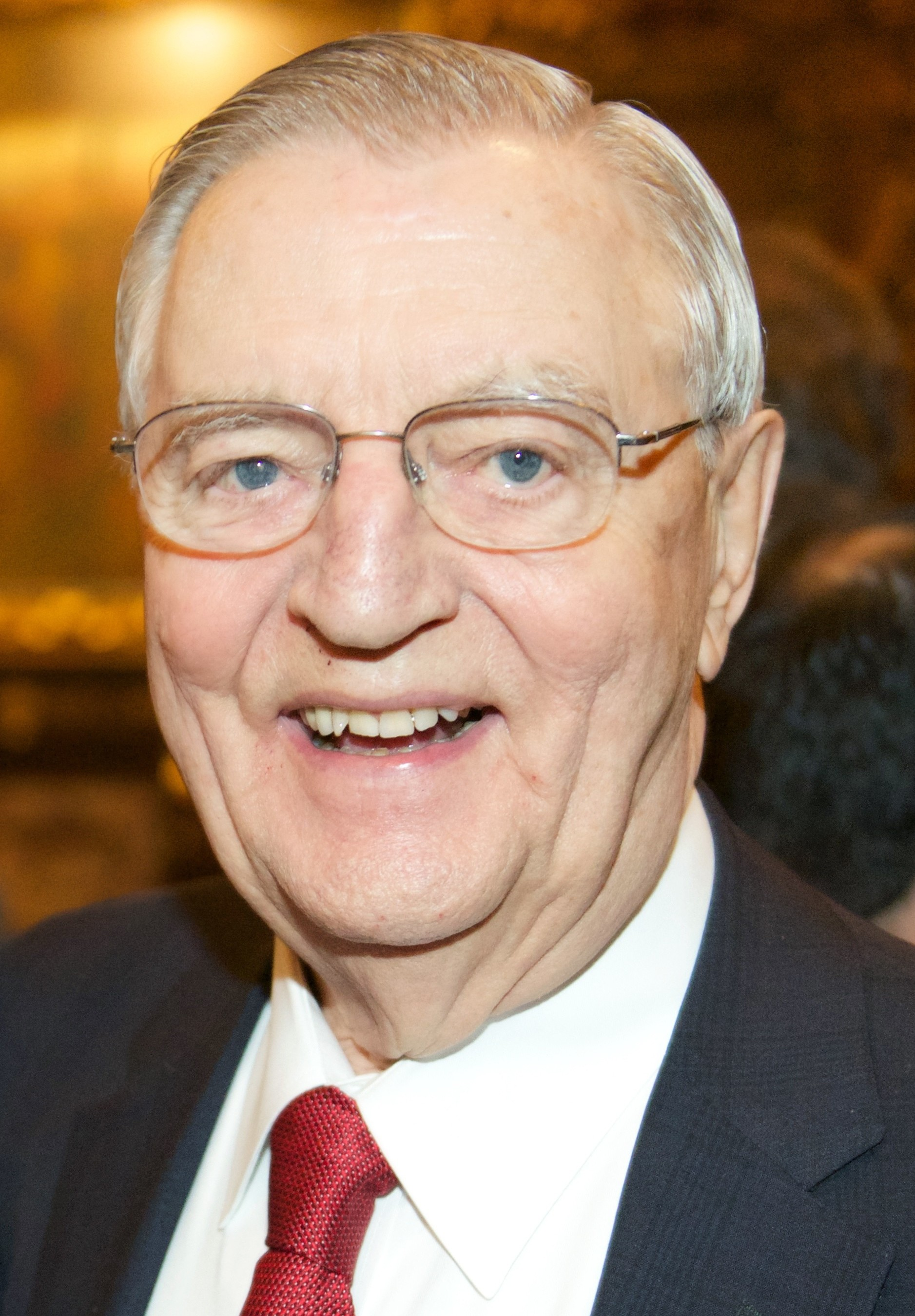
Walter Mondale

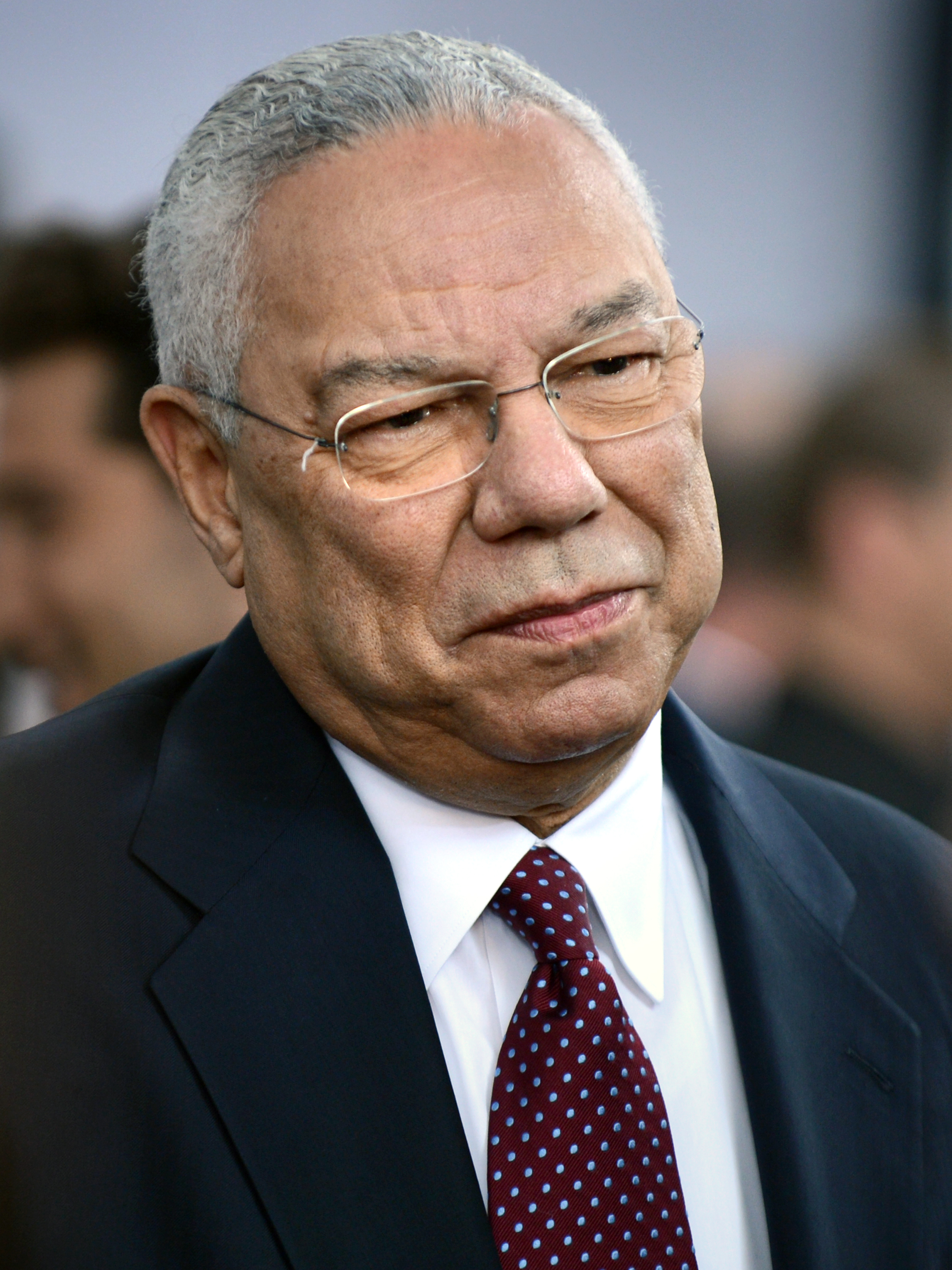
Colin Powell

Name	Position	Party	In office	Ref
Madeleine Albright	64th secretary of state	Democratic	1997–2001	
Colin Powell	65th secretary of state	Republican	2001–05	
John Kerry	68th secretary of state	Democratic	2013–17	
William Cohen	20th secretary of defense	Republican	1997–2001	
Leon Panetta	23rd secretary of defense	Democratic	2011–13	
Cecil Andrus	42nd secretary of the interior	Democratic	1977–81	
Ken Salazar	50th secretary of the interior	Democratic	2009–13	
Mack McLarty	17th White House chief of staff	Democratic	1993–94	
Erskine Bowles	19th White House chief of staff	Democratic	1997–98	
John Podesta	20th White House chief of staff	Democratic	1998–2001	
William M. Daley	25th White House chief of staff	Democratic	2011–12	
Henry Cisneros	10th secretary of housing and urban development	Democratic	1993–97	
Julian Castro	16th secretary of housing and urban development	Democratic	2014–2017	
Michael Chertoff	2nd secretary of Homeland Security	Republican	2005–09	
Bill Richardson	9th secretary of energy	Democratic	1998–2001	
Steven Chu	12th secretary of energy	Democratic	2009–13	
Austan Goolsbee	26th chair of the Council of Economic Advisers	Democratic	2010–11	
Carlos Gutierrez	35th secretary of commerce	Republican	2005–09	
Gary Locke	36th secretary of commerce	Democratic	2009–11	
Robert Reich	22nd secretary of labor	Democratic	1993–97	
Alexis Herman	23rd secretary of labor	Democratic	1997–2001	
Hilda Solis	25th secretary of labor	Democratic	2009–2013	
Carla Hills	10th trade representative	Republican	1989–93	
Ron Kirk	16th trade representative	Democratic	2009–2013	
Eric Holder	86th attorney general	Democratic	2009–2015	
Karen Mills	23rd administrator of the Small Business Administration	Democratic	2009-13	
Rodney E. Slater	13th secretary of transportation	Democratic	1997–2001	
Norman Mineta	14th secretary of transportation	Democratic	2001–2006	
Mary E. Peters	15th secretary of transportation	Republican	2006–2009	
Henry Paulson	74th secretary of the treasury	Republican	2006–09	
Andrew Young	14th ambassador to the United Nations	Democratic	1977–79	
Thomas R. Pickering	18th ambassador to the United Nations	Democratic	1989–92	
William Ruckelshaus	1st and 5th administrator of the Environmental Protection Agency	Republican	1970–73, 1983–85	
William K. Reilly	7th administrator of the Environmental Protection Agency	Republican	1989–93	
Carol Browner	8th administrator of the Environmental Protection Agency	Democratic	1993–2001	
Christine Todd Whitman	9th administrator of the Environmental Protection Agency	Republican	2001–03	
Lisa P. Jackson	12th administrator of the Environmental Protection Agency	Democratic	2009–13	
Richard Riley	6th secretary of education	Democratic	1993–2001	
Louis Wade Sullivan	17th secretary of health and human services	Republican	1989–93	
Donna Shalala	18th secretary of health and human services	Democratic	1993–2001	
Kathleen Sebelius	21st secretary of health and human services	Democratic	2009–14	
Laura Tyson	16th chair of the Council of Economic Advisers	Democratic	1993–95	
Joseph Stiglitz	17th chair of the Council of Economic Advisers	Democratic	1995–97	
James Lee Witt	Director of the Federal Emergency Management Agency	Democratic	1993–2001	

=== State and territorial governors ===
Current (as of 2016)

Name	Position	Party	Ref
Jerry Brown	34th governor of California	Democratic	
Kate Brown	38th governor of Oregon	Democratic	
Steve Bullock	24th governor of Montana	Democratic	
Andrew Cuomo	56th governor of New York	Democratic	
Mark Dayton	40th governor of Minnesota	Democratic	
John Bel Edwards	56th governor of Louisiana	Democratic	
Maggie Hassan	81st governor of New Hampshire	Democratic	
John Hickenlooper	42nd governor of Colorado	Democratic	
Jay Inslee	23rd governor of Washington	Democratic	
Dan Malloy	88th governor of Connecticut	Democratic	
Jack Markell	73rd governor of Delaware	Democratic	
Terry McAuliffe	72nd governor of Virginia	Democratic	
Lolo Matalasi Moliga	57th governor of American Samoa	Democratic	
Jay Nixon	55th governor of Missouri	Democratic	
Alejandro García Padilla	11th governor of Puerto Rico	Democratic	
Gina Raimondo	75th governor of Rhode Island	Democratic	
Peter Shumlin	81st governor of Vermont	Democratic	
Earl Ray Tomblin	35th governor of West Virginia	Democratic	
Tom Wolf	47th governor of Pennsylvania	Democratic	

Former

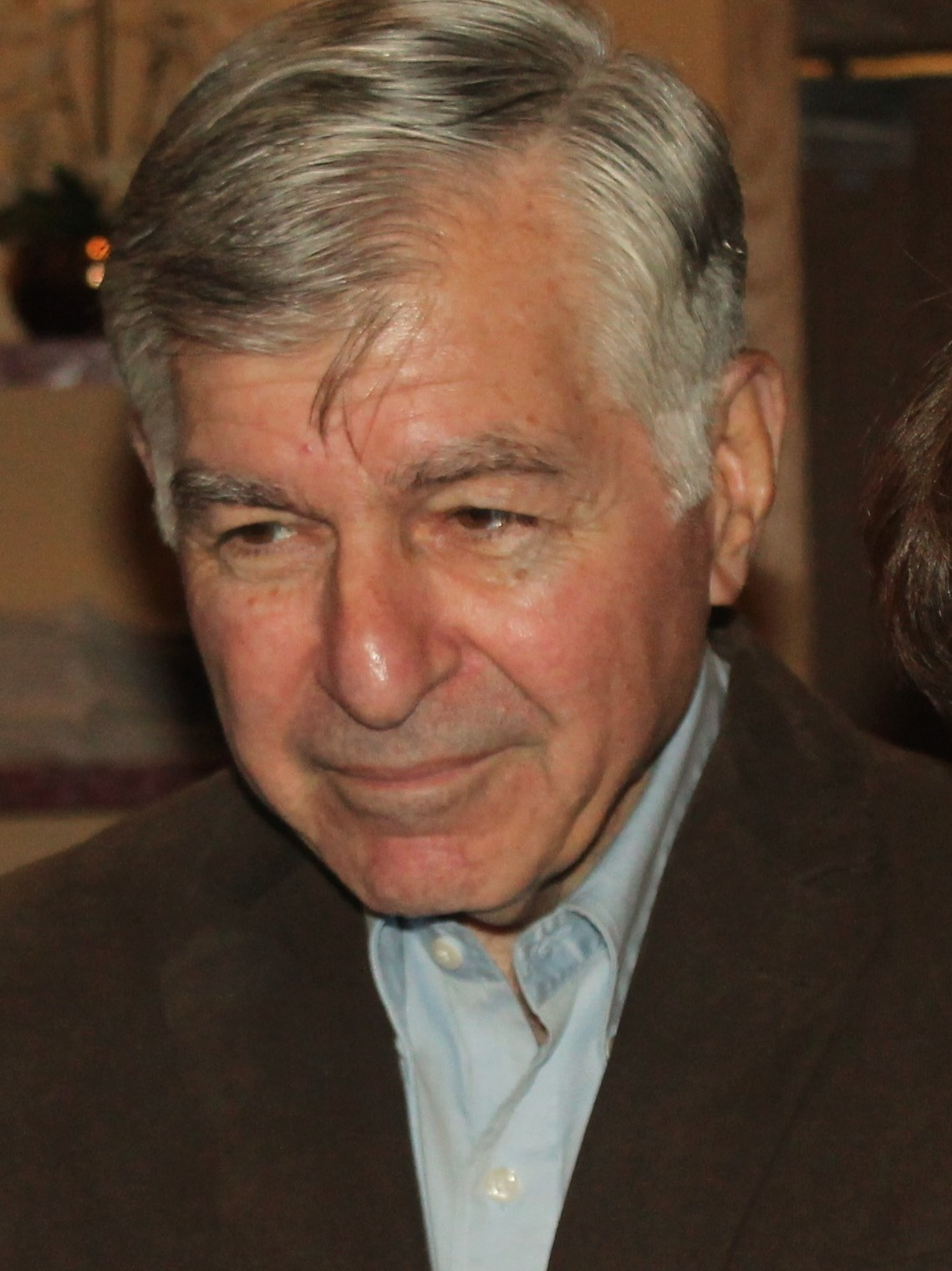
Michael Dukakis

- George Ariyoshi, 3rd governor of Hawaii (1974–86)
- John Baldacci, 73rd governor of Maine (2003–11)
- Evan Bayh, 46th governor of Indiana (1989–97)
- Mike Beebe, 45th governor of Arkansas (2007–15)
- Steve Beshear, 61st governor of Kentucky (2007–15)
- James Blanchard, 45th governor of Michigan (1983–91)
- John W. Carlin,* 40th governor of Kansas (1979–87)
- Arne Carlson,* 37th governor of Minnesota (1991–99) (Republican)
- Ben Cayetano, 5th governor of Hawaii (1994–2002)
- Dick Celeste, 64th governor of Ohio (1983–91)
- Lincoln Chafee, 74th governor of Rhode Island (2011–15)
- Jon Corzine, 54th governor of New Jersey (2006–10)
- Charlie Crist, 44th governor of Florida (Note: Republican Party member while in office, but has since left the party) (2007–11)
- Gray Davis, 37th governor of California (1999–2004)
- Howard Dean, 79th governor of Vermont (1991–2003)
- Jim Doyle, 44th governor of Wisconsin (2003–11)
- Michael Dukakis, 65th & 67th governor of Massachusetts (1975–79, 1983–91)
- Jim Folsom Jr., 50th governor of Alabama (1993–95)
- Jennifer Granholm, 47th governor of Michigan (2003–11)
- Christine Gregoire, 22nd governor of Washington (2005–13)
- Jim Hodges, 114th governor of South Carolina (1999–2003)
- Bob Holden, 53rd governor of Missouri (2001–05)
- Linwood Holton, 61st governor of Virginia (1970–74) (Republican)
- Jim Hunt, 69th & 71st governor of North Carolina (1977–85, 1993–2001)
- Bob Kerrey, 35th governor of Nebraska (1983–87)
- Ted Kulongoski, 36th governor of Oregon (2003–11)
- Madeleine M. Kunin, 77th governor of Vermont (1985–91)
- John Lynch,* 80th governor of New Hampshire (2005–13)
- Bob Miller, 26th governor of Nevada (1989–99)
- William Milliken,* 44th governor of Michigan (1969–83) (Republican)
- Ronnie Musgrove, 61st governor of Mississippi (2000–04)
- George Nigh, 17th & 22nd governor of Oklahoma (1963, 1979–87)
- Martin O'Malley, 61st governor of Maryland (2007–15)
- David Paterson, 55th governor of New York (2008–10)
- Deval Patrick,* 71st governor of Massachusetts (2007–15)
- Bev Perdue, 73rd governor of North Carolina (2009–13)
- David Pryor, 39th governor of Arkansas (1975–79)
- Ed Rendell, 45th governor of Pennsylvania (2003–11)
- Bill Ritter, 41st governor of Colorado (2007–11)
- Barbara Roberts, 34th governor of Oregon (1991–95)
- Jay Rockefeller, 29th governor of West Virginia (1977–85)
- Roy Romer, 39th governor of Colorado (1987–99)
- Bill Sheffield, 5th governor of Alaska (1982–86)
- George A. Sinner, 29th governor of North Dakota (1985–92)
- Ted Strickland, 68th governor of Ohio (2007–11)
- Mike Sullivan 29th governor of Wyoming (1987–95)
- Jim Guy Tucker, 43rd governor of Arkansas (1992–96)
- John D. Waihee III, 4th governor of Hawaii (1986–94)
- David Walters, 24th governor of Oklahoma (1991–95)
- William F. Winter, 58th governor of Mississippi (1980–84)

=== U.S. senators ===
Current

- Tammy Baldwin, Wisconsin
- Michael Bennet, Colorado
- Richard Blumenthal, Connecticut
- Cory Booker, New Jersey
- Barbara Boxer, California
- Sherrod Brown, Ohio
- Maria Cantwell, Washington
- Ben Cardin, Maryland
- Tom Carper, Delaware
- Bob Casey Jr., Pennsylvania
- Chris Coons, Delaware
- Joe Donnelly, Indiana
- Dick Durbin, Min. Whip, Illinois
- Dianne Feinstein, California
- Al Franken, Minnesota
- Kirsten Gillibrand, New York
- Martin Heinrich, New Mexico
- Heidi Heitkamp, North Dakota
- Mazie Hirono, Hawaii
- Tim Kaine, Virginia
- Angus King,* Maine (Independent)
- Amy Klobuchar, Minnesota
- Patrick Leahy, Vermont
- Joe Manchin, West Virginia
- Ed Markey, Massachusetts
- Claire McCaskill, Missouri
- Bob Menendez, New Jersey
- Jeff Merkley,* Oregon
- Barbara Mikulski, Maryland
- Chris Murphy, Connecticut
- Patty Murray, Washington
- Bill Nelson, Florida
- Gary Peters, Michigan
- Jack Reed, Rhode Island
- Bernie Sanders,* Vermont (Independent)
- Brian Schatz, Hawaii
- Chuck Schumer, New York
- Jeanne Shaheen, New Hampshire
- Debbie Stabenow, Michigan
- Jon Tester,* Montana
- Tom Udall, New Mexico
- Mark Warner, Virginia
- Elizabeth Warren,* Massachusetts
- Sheldon Whitehouse, Rhode Island
- Ron Wyden, Oregon

Former

- Daniel Akaka, Hawaii (1990–2013)
- Bill Bradley,* (Note: Hall of Fame inductee) New Jersey (1979–97)
- Jean Carnahan, Missouri (2001–02)
- Kent Conrad, North Dakota (1987–2013)
- Mo Cowan,* Massachusetts (2013)
- Tom Daschle, maj. leader, South Dakota (1987–2005)
- Chris Dodd, Connecticut (1981–2011)
- Byron Dorgan, North Dakota (1992–2011)
- David Durenberger, Minnesota (1978–95) (Independent)
- Russ Feingold,* Wisconsin (1993–2011)
- John Glenn, Ohio (1974–99)
- Bob Graham, Florida (1987–2005)
- Kay Hagan, North Carolina (2009–15)
- Tom Harkin, Iowa (1985–2015)
- Fred R. Harris, Oklahoma (1964–73)
- Gordon J. Humphrey,* New Hampshire (1979–90) (Republican)
- Tim Johnson, South Dakota (1997–2015)
- Herb Kohl, Wisconsin (1989–2013)
- Bob Krueger, Texas (1993)
- Mary Landrieu, Louisiana (1997–2015)
- Joe Lieberman,* Connecticut (1989–2013) (Independent)
- Blanche Lincoln, Arkansas (1999–2011)
- George J. Mitchell, maj. leader, Maine (1980–95)
- Larry Pressler, South Dakota (1979–97) (Independent)
- Mark Pryor, Arkansas (2003–15)
- Harry Reid, min. leader, Nevada (1987–2017)
- Robert Torricelli, New Jersey (1997–2003)
- Mark Udall,* Colorado (2009–15)
- John Warner,* Virginia (1979–2009) (Republican)
- Lowell Weicker,* Connecticut (Republican in Senate, later Independent)

=== U.S. representatives ===
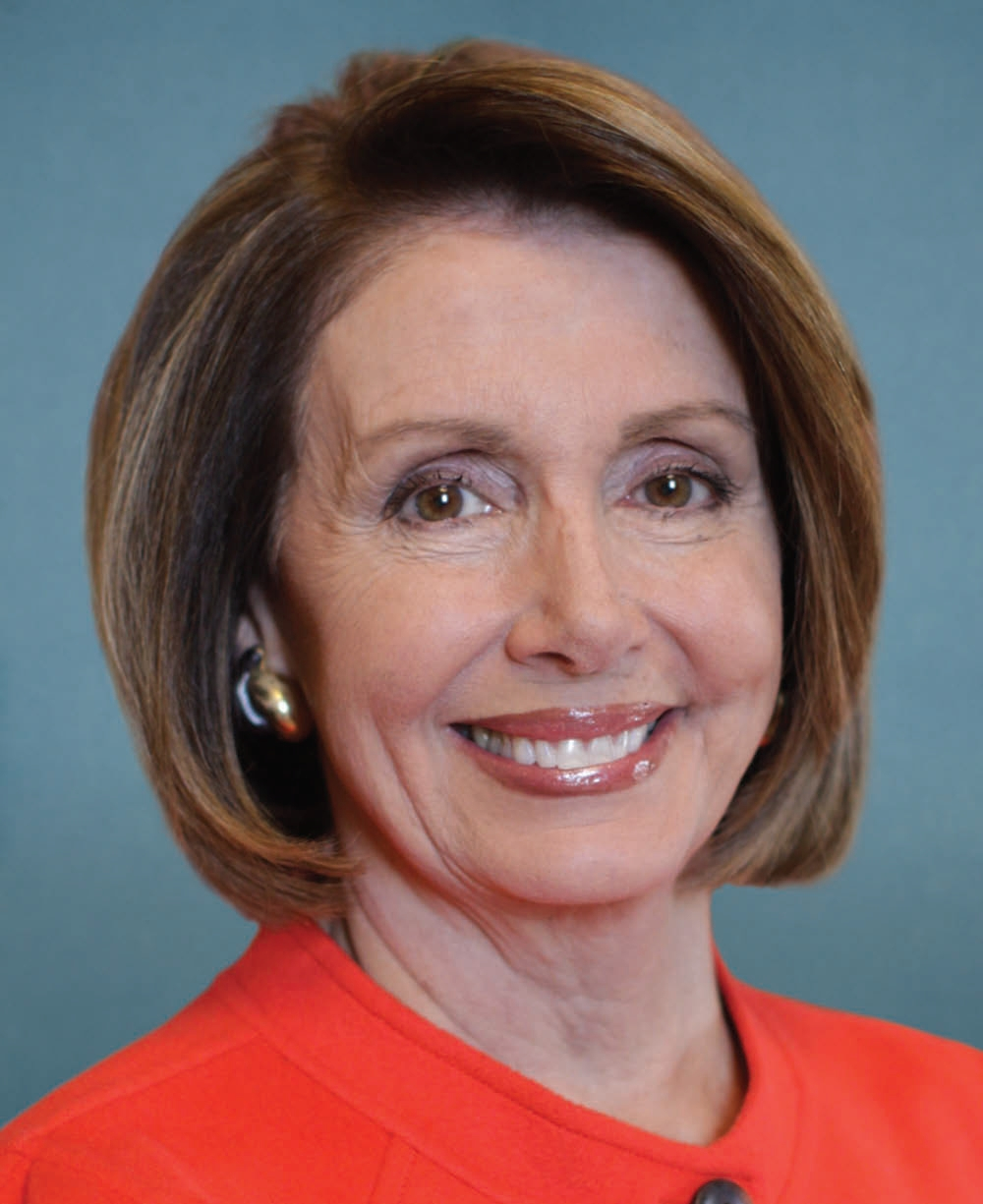
Nancy Pelosi

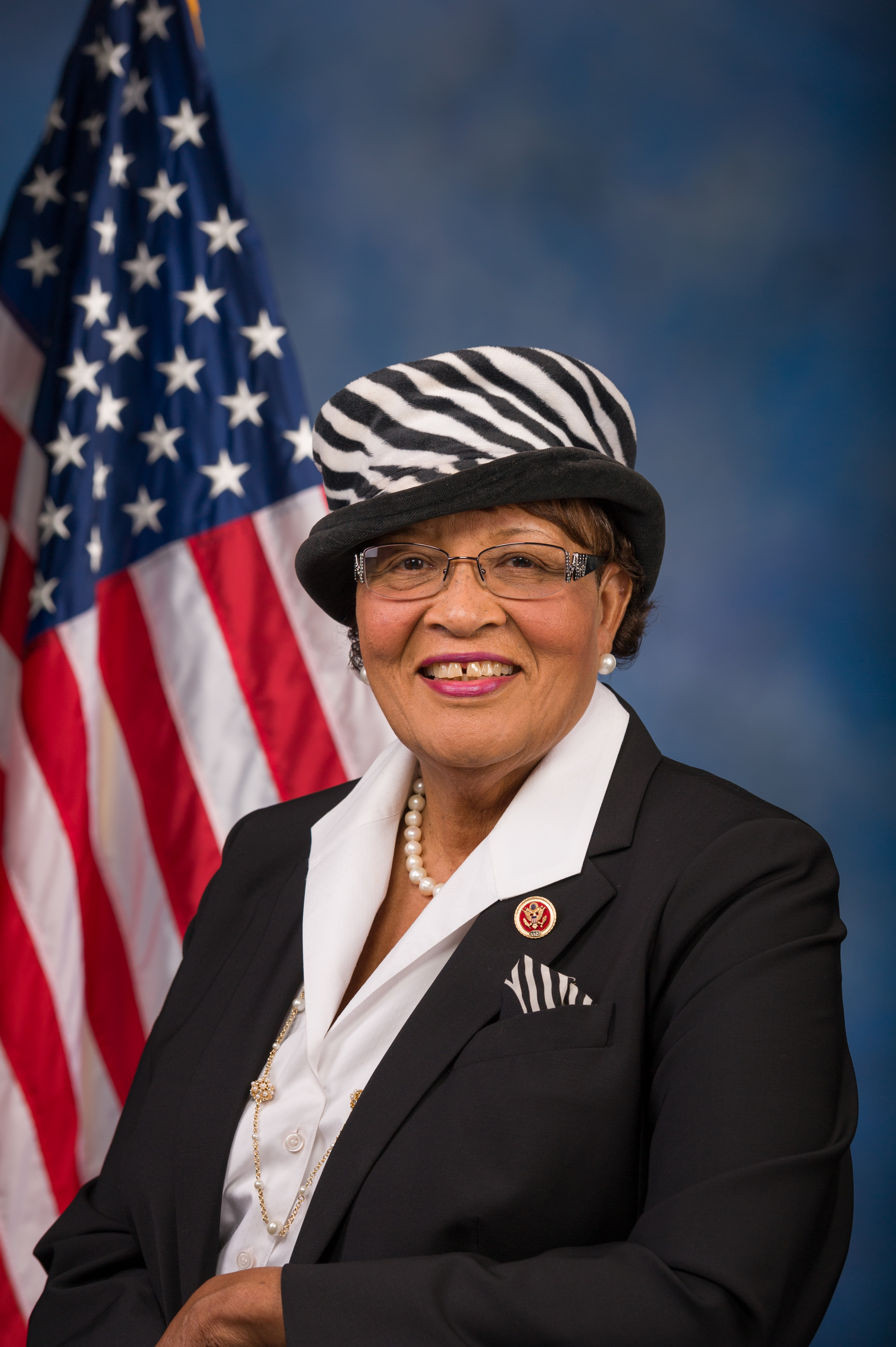
Alma Adams

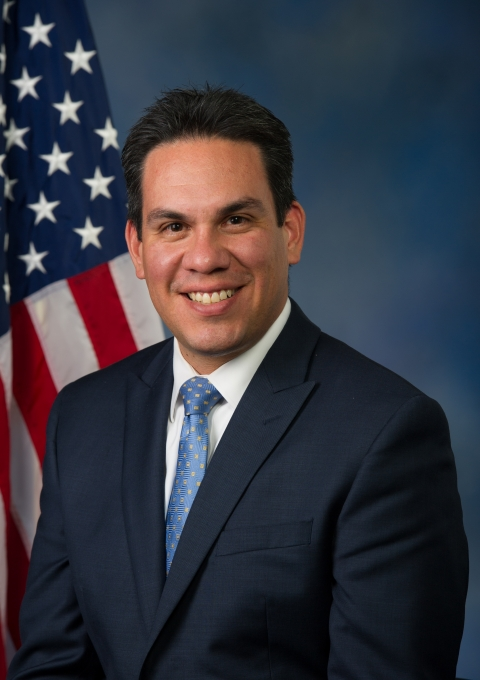
Pete Aguilar

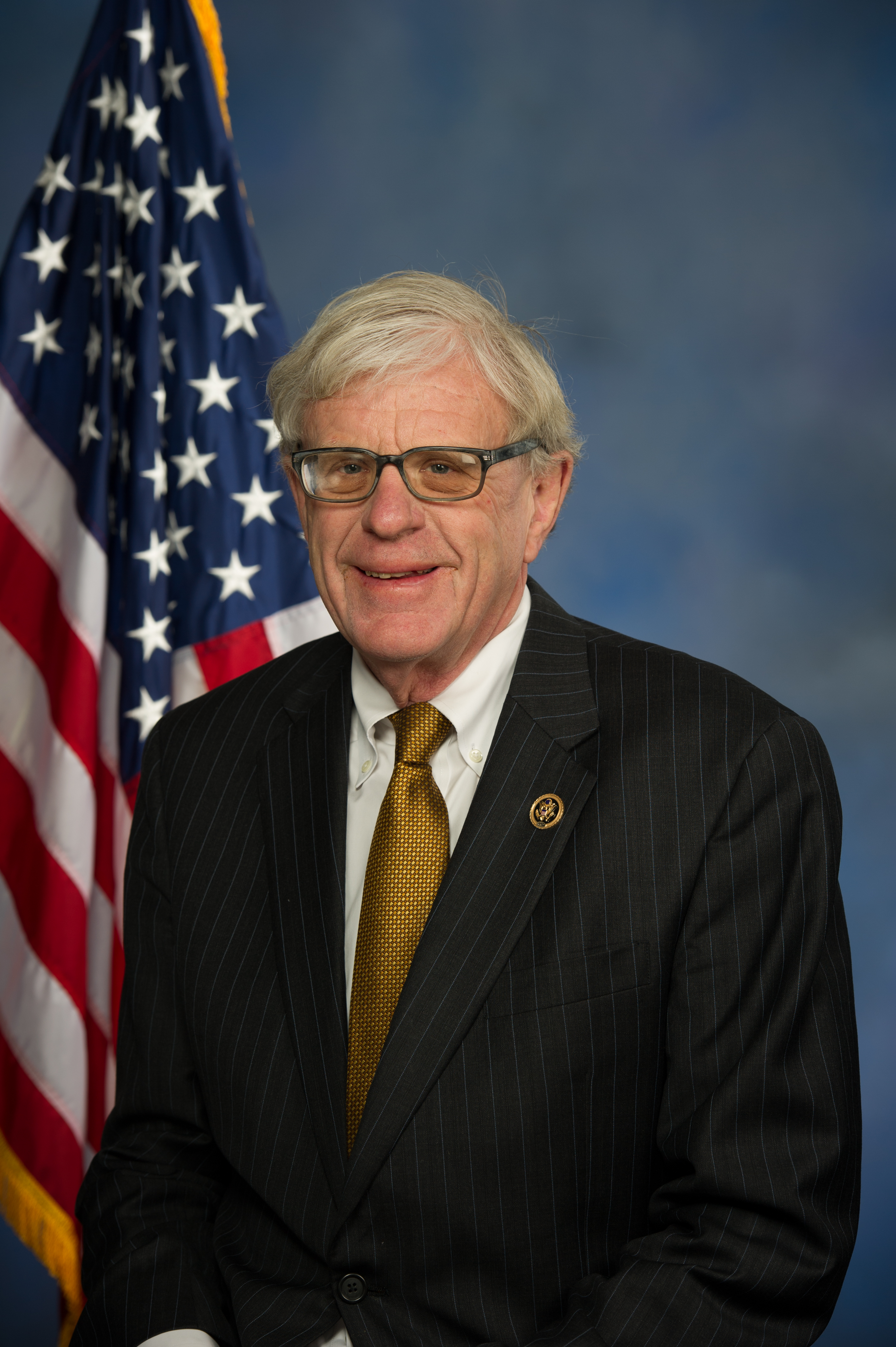
Brad Ashford

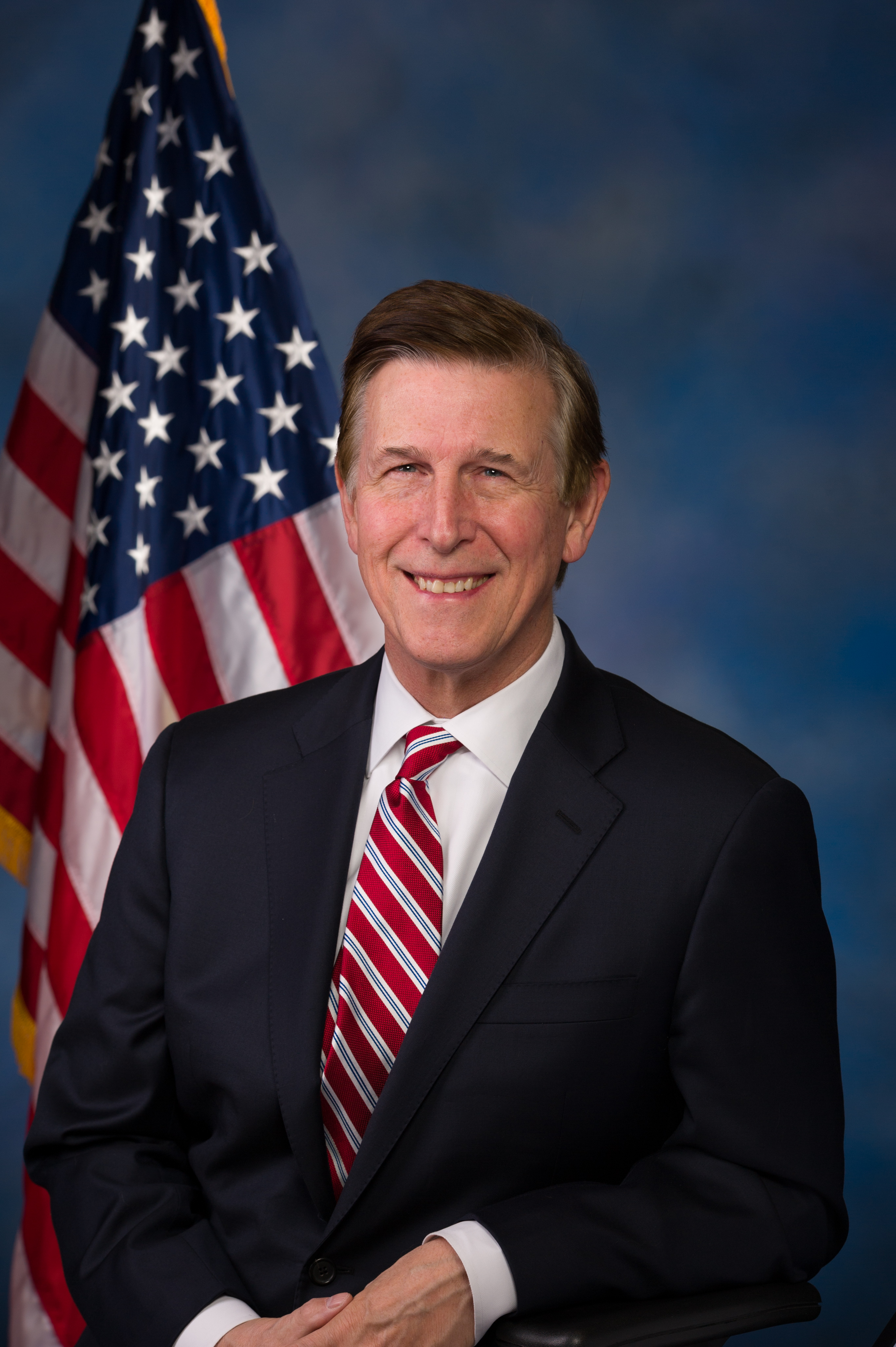
Don Beyer

Current

- Alma Adams, North Carolina
- Pete Aguilar, California
- Brad Ashford, Nebraska
- Karen Bass, California
- Joyce Beatty, Ohio
- Xavier Becerra, California
- Ami Bera, California
- Don Beyer, Virginia
- Earl Blumenauer, Oregon
- Suzanne Bonamici, Oregon
- Madeleine Bordallo, Guam Del.
- Brendan Boyle, Pennsylvania
- Bob Brady, Pennsylvania
- Corrine Brown, Florida
- Julia Brownley, California
- Cheri Bustos, Illinois
- G. K. Butterfield, North Carolina
- Lois Capps, California
- Michael Capuano, Massachusetts
- Tony Cardenas, California
- John C. Carney Jr., Delaware
- André Carson, Indiana
- Matt Cartwright, Pennsylvania
- Kathy Castor, Florida
- Joaquín Castro, Texas
- Judy Chu, California
- David Cicilline, Rhode Island
- Katherine Clark, Massachusetts
- Yvette Clarke, New York
- William Lacy Clay Jr., Missouri
- Emanuel Cleaver, Missouri
- Jim Clyburn, Ass. Min. Leader, South Carolina
- Steve Cohen, Tennessee
- Gerry Connolly, Virginia
- John Conyers, 44th dean, Michigan
- Jim Cooper, Tennessee
- Joe Courtney, Connecticut
- Jim Costa, California
- Joseph Crowley, New York
- Henry Cuellar, Texas
- Elijah Cummings, Maryland
- Danny K. Davis, Illinois
- Susan Davis, California
- Diana DeGette, Colorado
- John Delaney, Maryland
- Rosa DeLauro, Connecticut
- Suzan DelBene, Washington
- Mark DeSaulnier, California
- Ted Deutch, Florida
- Debbie Dingell, Michigan
- Lloyd Doggett, Texas
- Michael F. Doyle, Pennsylvania
- Tammy Duckworth, Illinois
- Donna Edwards, Maryland
- Keith Ellison,* Minnesota
- Eliot Engel, New York
- Anna Eshoo, California
- Elizabeth Esty, Connecticut
- Sam Farr, California
- Bill Foster, Illinois
- Lois Frankel, Florida
- Marcia Fudge, Ohio
- Tulsi Gabbard,* Hawaii
- Ruben Gallego, Arizona
- John Garamendi, California
- Gwen Graham, Florida
- Al Green, Texas
- Gene Green, Texas
- Raúl Grijalva,* Arizona
- Luis Gutiérrez, Illinois
- Janice Hahn, California
- Richard L. Hanna,* New York (Republican)
- Alcee Hastings, Florida
- Denny Heck, Washington
- Brian Higgins, New York
- Rubén Hinojosa, Texas
- Jim Himes, Connecticut
- Eleanor Holmes Norton, D.C. Del.
- Mike Honda, California
- Steny Hoyer, Min. Whip, Maryland
- Jared Huffman, California
- Steve Israel, New York
- Sheila Jackson Lee, Texas
- Hakeem Jeffries, New York
- Eddie Bernice Johnson, Texas
- Hank Johnson, Georgia
- Bill R. Keating, Massachusetts
- Robin Kelly, Illinois
- Joseph P. Kennedy III, Massachusetts
- Dan Kildee, Michigan
- Derek Kilmer, Washington
- Ron Kind, Wisconsin
- Ann Kirkpatrick, Arizona
- Ann Kuster, New Hampshire
- Jim Langevin, Rhode Island
- Rick Larsen, Washington
- John B. Larson, Connecticut
- Brenda Lawrence, Michigan
- Barbara Lee,* California
- Sandy Levin, Michigan
- John Lewis, Georgia
- Ted Lieu, California
- Dave Loebsack, Iowa
- Zoe Lofgren, California
- Alan Lowenthal, California
- Nita Lowey, New York
- Ben Ray Luján, New Mexico
- Michelle Lujan Grisham, New Mexico
- Stephen F. Lynch, Massachusetts
- Carolyn Maloney, New York
- Sean Patrick Maloney, New York
- Doris Matsui, California
- Jim McDermott, Washington
- Jim P. McGovern, Massachusetts
- Jerry McNerney, California
- Gregory W. Meeks, New York
- Grace Meng, New York
- Gwen Moore, Wisconsin
- Seth Moulton, Massachusetts
- Patrick E. Murphy, Florida
- Jerrold Nadler, New York
- Grace Napolitano, California
- Richard Neal, Massachusetts
- Donald Norcross, New Jersey
- Beto O'Rourke, Texas
- Frank Pallone, New Jersey
- Bill Pascrell, New Jersey
- Donald Payne Jr., New Jersey
- Nancy Pelosi, min. leader, California
- Ed Perlmutter, Colorado
- Scott H. Peters, California
- Pedro Pierluisi, Puerto Rico Res. Comm.
- Chellie Pingree, Maine
- Stacey Plaskett, Virgin Islands Del.
- Mark Pocan,* Wisconsin
- Jared Polis, Colorado
- David E. Price, North Carolina
- Mike Quigley, Illinois
- Lucille Roybal-Allard, California
- Charles Rangel, New York
- Kathleen Rice, New York
- Cedric Richmond, Louisiana
- Raul Ruiz, California
- Dutch Ruppersberger, Maryland
- Bobby Rush, Illinois
- Tim J. Ryan, Ohio
- Gregorio Sablan, Northern Mariana Islands Del.
- Linda Sánchez, California
- Loretta Sanchez, California
- John Sarbanes, Maryland
- Jan Schakowsky, Illinois
- Adam Schiff, California
- Kurt Schrader, Oregon
- Bobby C. Scott, Virginia
- David A. Scott, Georgia
- José E. Serrano, New York
- Terri Sewell, Alabama
- Brad Sherman, California
- Albio Sires, New Jersey
- Louise Slaughter, New York
- David Adam Smith, Washington
- Jackie Speier, California
- Eric Swalwell, California
- Mark Takano, California
- Bennie Thompson, Mississippi
- Mike Thompson, California
- Dina Titus, Nevada
- Paul Tonko, New York
- Norma Torres, California
- Niki Tsongas, Massachusetts
- Chris Van Hollen, Maryland
- Juan Vargas, California
- Marc Veasey, Texas
- Filemon Vela Jr., Texas
- Nydia Velázquez, New York
- Maxine Waters, California
- Bonnie Watson Coleman, New Jersey
- Tim Walz, Minnesota
- Debbie Wasserman Schultz, Florida
- Frederica Wilson, Florida
- John Yarmuth, Kentucky

Former

- Tom Allen, Maine (1997–2009)
- Rob Andrews, New Jersey (1990–2014)
- Ron Barber, Arizona (2013–15)
- Shelley Berkley, Nevada (1999–2013)
- Robert Marion Berry, Arkansas (1997–2011)
- James Bilbray, Nevada (1987–95)
- Tim Bishop, New York (2003–15)
- Sherwood Boehlert,* New York (1983–2007) (Republican)
- Dennis Cardoza, California (2003–12)
- Russ Carnahan, Missouri (2005–13)
- Donna Christian-Christensen, Virgin Islands Del. (1997–2015)
- Tony Coelho, maj. whip, California (1979–89)
- Jerry Costello, Illinois (1988–2013)
- Lincoln Davis, Tennessee (2003–11)
- John Dingell, 43rd dean, Michigan (1955–2015)
- Chaka Fattah, Pennsylvania (1995–2016)
- Vic Fazio, caucus chair, California (1979–99)
- Floyd H. Flake, New York (1987–97)
- Harold Ford Jr., Tennessee (1997–2007)
- Barney Frank, Massachusetts (1981–2013)
- Martin Frost, caucus chair, Texas (1979–2005)
- Pete Gallego, Texas (2013–15)
- Joe Garcia, Florida (2013–15)
- Robert Garcia, New York (1978–90)
- Dick Gephardt, maj. leader, Missouri (1977–2005)
- Gabby Giffords, Arizona (2007–12)
- Bart Gordon, Tennessee (1985–2011)
- Colleen Hanabusa, Hawaii (2011–15)
- Stephanie Herseth Sandlin, South Dakota (2004–11)
- Earl F. Hilliard, Alabama (1993–2003)
- Paul Hodes, New Hampshire (2007–11)
- Amo Houghton, New York (1987–2005) (Republican)
- Joseph P. Kennedy II, Massachusetts (1987–99)
- Patrick J. Kennedy,* Rhode Island (1995–2011)
- Barbara B. Kennelly, caucus vice-chair, Connecticut (1982–99)
- Ron Klein, Florida (2007–11)
- Nick Lampson, Texas (1997–2005; 2007–09)
- Larry LaRocco, Idaho (1991–95)
- Bill Luther, Minnesota (1995–2003)
- Marjorie Margolies, Pennsylvania (1993–1995)
- Betsy Markey, Colorado (2009–11)
- Carolyn McCarthy, New York (1997–2015)
- Charles Thomas McMillen, Maryland (1987–93)
- Kweisi Mfume, Maryland (1987–96)
- Harry Mitchell, Arizona (2007–11)
- Jim Moran, Virginia (1991–2015)
- Connie Morella, Maryland (1987–2003) (Republican)
- Bruce Morrison, Connecticut (1983–91)
- John Olver, Massachusetts (1991–2013)
- Ed Pastor, Arizona (1991–2015)
- Earl Pomeroy, North Dakota (1993–2011)
- Nick Rahall, West Virginia (1977–2015)
- Michael A. Ross, Arkansas (2001–13)
- Lynn Schenk, California (1993–95)
- Brad Schneider, Illinois (2013–15)
- Claudine Schneider,* Rhode Island (1981–91) (Republican)
- Allyson Schwartz, Pennsylvania (2005–15)
- Joe Schwarz,* Michigan (2005–07) (Independent)
- Chris Shays, Connecticut (1987–2009) (Republican)
- Carol Shea-Porter, New Hampshire (2007–11, 2013–15)
- John Spratt, South Carolina (1983–2011)
- Richard H. Stallings, Idaho (1985–93)
- Bart Stupak, Michigan (1993–2011)
- Dick Swett, New Hampshire (1991–95)
- Mark Takai^{†}, Hawaii (2015–16)
- John S. Tanner, Tennessee (1989–2011)
- Ellen Tauscher, California (1997–2009)
- Edolphus Towns, New York (1983–2013)
- Henry Waxman, California (1975–2015)
- Anthony Weiner, New York (1999–2011)
- Robert Wexler, Florida (1997–2010)
- Alan Wheat, Missouri (1983–95)
- Pat Williams, Montana (1979–97)

=== Former members of the federal judiciary ===
- U. W. Clemon, chief judge, N.D. Ala. (1999–2006)

== State officials ==
=== Executive officials ===
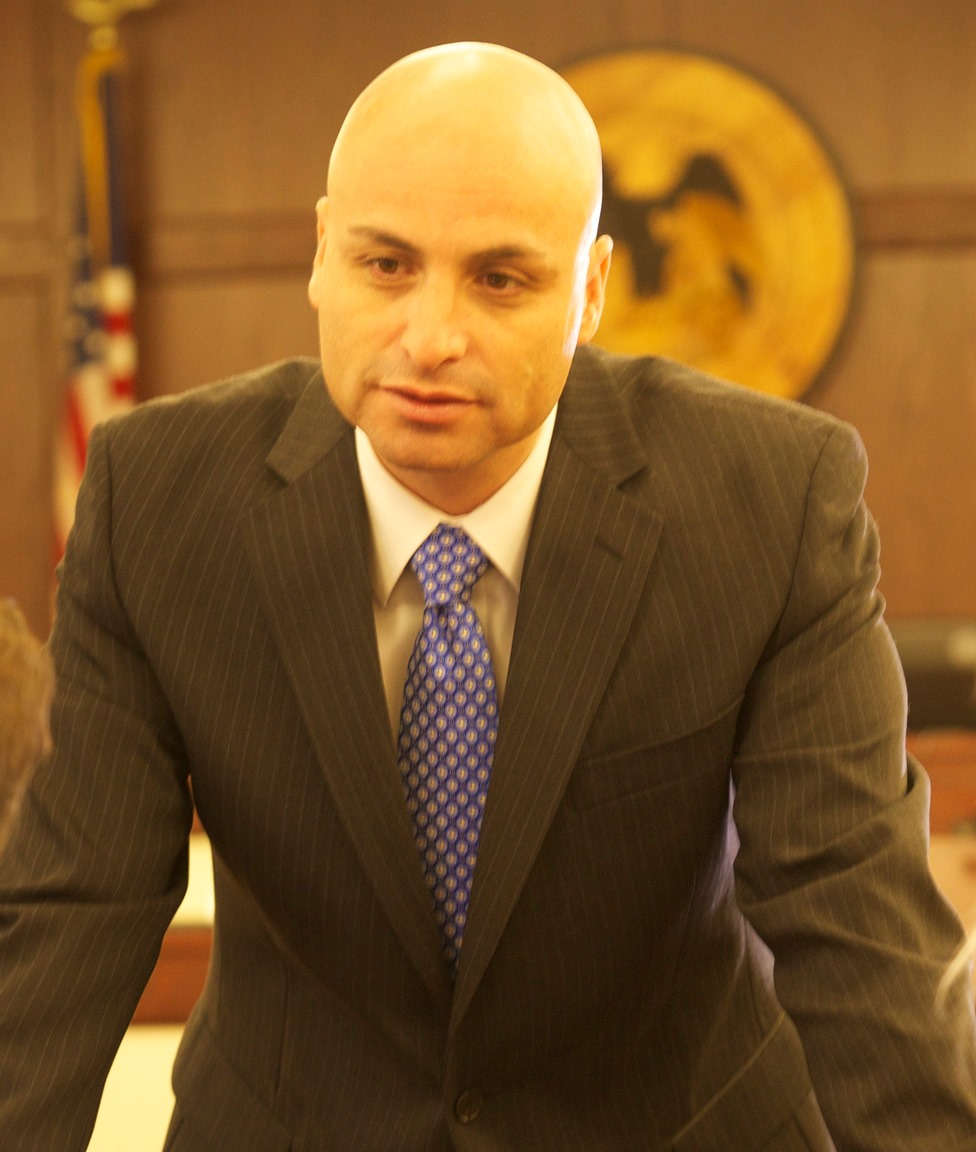
Hector Balderas

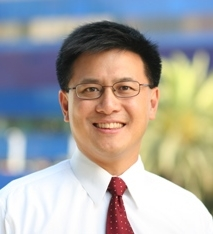
John Chiang

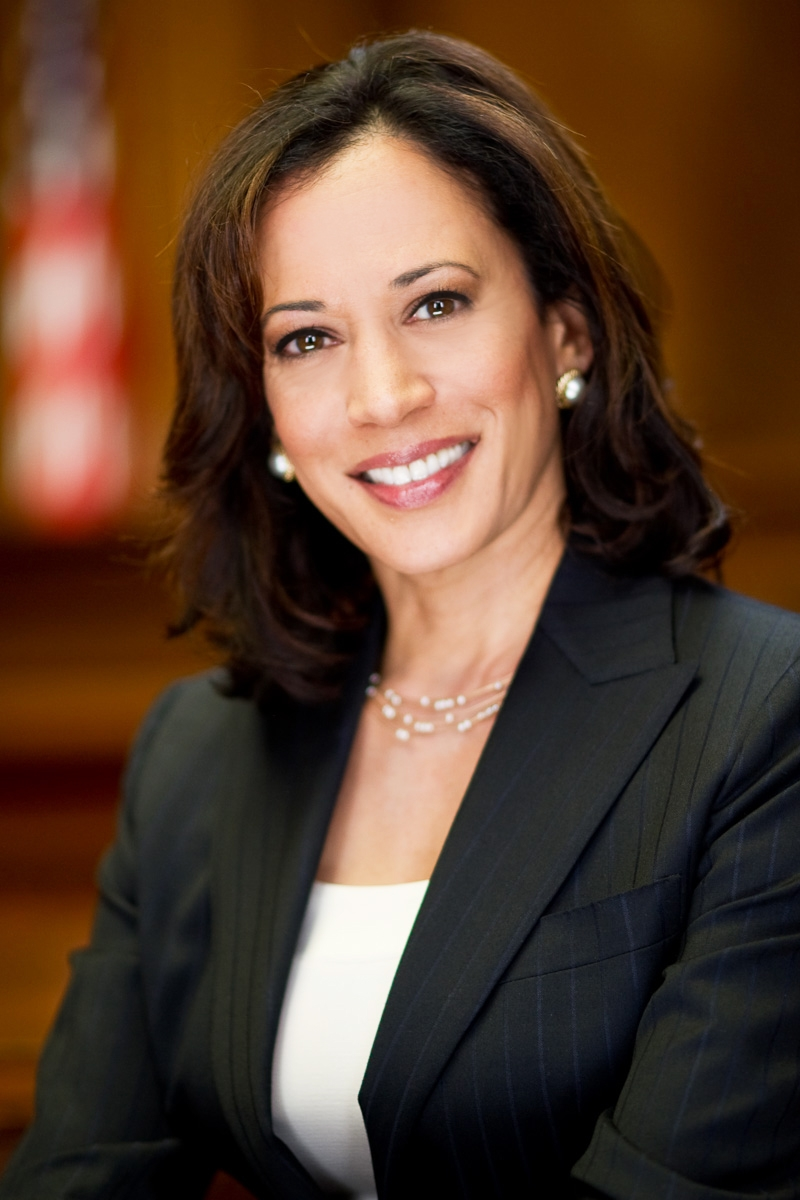
Kamala Harris

Current

- Hector Balderas, 31st attorney general of New Mexico
- Suzanne Bump, 22nd Massachusetts state auditor
- John Chiang, 33rd California treasurer
- Roy Cooper,* 48th attorney general of North Carolina
- Janet Cowell, North Carolina state treasurer
- Thomas DiNapoli, 54th New York state comptroller
- Robert W. Ferguson, 18th attorney general of Washington
- Michael Fitzgerald, 25th Iowa treasurer
- Peter Franchot, 33rd comptroller of Maryland
- Mike Frerichs, 74th Illinois treasurer
- Nicole Galloway, 38th state auditor of Missouri
- Joseph García, 48th lieutenant governor of Colorado
- Deb Goldberg, 58th treasurer and receiver-general of Massachusetts
- Nellie Gorbea, 28th secretary of state of Rhode Island
- Kamala Harris, 32nd California attorney general
- Maura Healey, 59th Massachusetts attorney general
- Mark Herring, 47th attorney general of Virginia
- Kathy Hochul, 64th lieutenant governor of New York
- Anne Holton, Virginia secretary of education
- George Jepsen, 24th attorney general of Connecticut
- Jason Kander, 39th Missouri secretary of state
- Nancy K. Kopp, 23rd treasurer of Maryland
- Chris Koster, 41st attorney general of Missouri
- Alison Lundergan Grimes, 76th secretary of state of Kentucky
- Fiona Ma, California Board of Equalization
- Lisa Madigan, 41st attorney general of Illinois
- Seth Magaziner, general treasurer of Rhode Island
- Tom J. Miller, 31st & 33rd Iowa attorney general
- Janet Mills, 55th & 57th Maine attorney general
- Gavin Newsom, 49th lieutenant governor of California
- Mary D. Nichols,* California Air Resources Board chair
- Ralph Northam, 40th lieutenant governor of Virginia
- Alex Padilla, 32nd secretary of state of California
- Chris Pappas, New Hampshire Executive Council
- John Perdue, West Virginia treasurer
- Ellen Rosenblum 17th Oregon attorney general
- Eric Schneiderman, 65th New York attorney general
- Tina Smith, 48th lieutenant governor of Minnesota
- Levar Stoney, secretary of the Commonwealth of Virginia
- Natalie Tennant, 29th secretary of state of West Virginia
- Shan Tsutsui, 12th lieutenant governor of Hawaii
- Colin Van Ostern, New Hampshire executive councillor
- Nancy Wyman, 88th lieutenant governor of Connecticut
- Betty Yee, 32nd California state controller

Former

- Phil Angelides,* 31st California treasurer (1999–2007)
- Thurbert Baker, 51st attorney general of Georgia (1997–2011)
- Ben Barnes, 36th lieutenant governor of Texas (1969–73)
- Elaine Baxter, 27th Iowa secretary of state (1987–95)
- Jere Beasley, 22nd lieutenant governor of Alabama (1971–79)
- Anne C. Boyle, former Nebraska Public Service commissioner
- Jay Bradford, former Arkansas insurance commissioner
- Anthony Brown, 8th lieutenant governor of Maryland (2007–15)
- Bob Brown,* 18th secretary of state of Montana (2001–05) (Republican)
- Kathleen Brown, 29th California state treasurer (1991–95)
- Bernie Buescher, 36th secretary of state of Colorado (2009–11)
- John Burkhalter, Arkansas highway commissioner (2011–13)
- Andrea Cabral, former Massachusetts secretary of public safety
- Bonnie Campbell, 32nd Iowa attorney general (1991–95)
- Robin Carnahan, 38th Missouri secretary of state (2005–13)
- Martha Coakley, 58th attorney general of Massachusetts (2007–15)
- Catherine Cortez Masto, 32nd attorney general of Nevada (2007–15)
- Frankie Sue Del Papa, 29th attorney general of Nevada (1991–2003)
- Diane Denish, 28th lieutenant governor of New Mexico (2003–11)
- Drew Edmondson, 16th attorney general of Oklahoma (1995–2011)
- Jimmie Lou Fisher, treasurer of Arkansas (1981–2003)
- Doug Gansler, 45th attorney general of Maryland (2007–15)
- Terry Goddard, 24th attorney general of Arizona
- Steve Grossman, 57th treasurer and receiver-general of Massachusetts (2011–15)
- Joan Growe, 19th Minnesota secretary of state (1975–99)
- Robert Harlan Henry, 14th attorney general of Oklahoma (1987–91)
- Beverly Hollingworth, former New Hampshire executive councillor
- Patty Judge,* 46th lieutenant governor of Iowa (2007–11)
- Kathleen Kane, 48th Pennsylvania attorney general (2013–16)
- Kathy Karpan, 17th secretary of state of Wyoming (1987–95)
- Cary Kennedy, Colorado treasurer (2007–2011)
- Kathleen Kennedy Townsend, 6th lieutenant governor of Maryland (1995–2003)
- Gloria Lawlah, former Maryland secretary of aging
- David M. Louie, 13th Hawaii attorney general (2011–14)
- Crit Luallen, 56th lieutenant governor of Kentucky (2014–15)
- Kate Marshall, Nevada state treasurer (2007–15)
- Garry Mauro, 25th Texas land commissioner (1983–99)
- Kenneth McClintock, 22nd secretary of state of Puerto Rico (2009–13)
- Dustin McDaniel, 55th attorney general of Arkansas (2007–15)
- Katie McGinty, former Pennsylvania secretary of environmental protection (2003–08)
- Dick Molpus, former secretary of state of Mississippi
- Irene Natividad, former Virginia secretary of transportation
- Tony Park, attorney general of Idaho (1971–75)
- Mona Pasquil, 47th lieutenant governor of California (2009–10)
- Sally Pederson, 45th lieutenant governor of Iowa (1999–2007)
- Debora Pignatelli, former New Hampshire executive councillor
- Yvonne Prettner Solon, 47th lieutenant governor of Minnesota (2011–15)
- Kim Robak, 35th lieutenant governor of Nebraska (1993–99)
- Jim Roth, Oklahoma corporation commissioner (2007–09)
- Pat Russell, former New Hampshire liquor commissioner
- M. Susan Savage, 29th secretary of state of Oklahoma (2003–11)
- Gail Schoettler, 44th lieutenant governor of Colorado (1995–99)
- Mark Shurtleff,* 19th attorney general of Utah (2001–13) (Republican)
- Alex Sink, 2nd chief financial officer of Florida (2007–11)
- Diana Taylor,* 42nd New York superintendent of banks (2003–07) (Republican)
- Inez Tenenbaum, 15th South Carolina superintendent of education (1999–2007)
- Mike Thurmond, Georgia labor commissioner (1999–2011)
- Mike Turpen, 13th attorney general of Oklahoma (1977–83)
- Fran Ulmer, 7th lieutenant governor of Alaska (1994–2002)
- Rick Wade, director of the South Carolina Department of Alcohol and Other Drug Abuse Services (1999–2002)
- Joan Wagnon, Kansas secretary of revenue (2003–11)
- Steve Westly, 30th California state controller (2003–07)
- Grant Woods,* 23rd attorney general of Arizona (1991–99) (Republican)
- Nancy Worley, 50th secretary of state of Alabama (2003–07)

=== State legislators ===
Alaska

- Rep. Matt Claman

Arizona

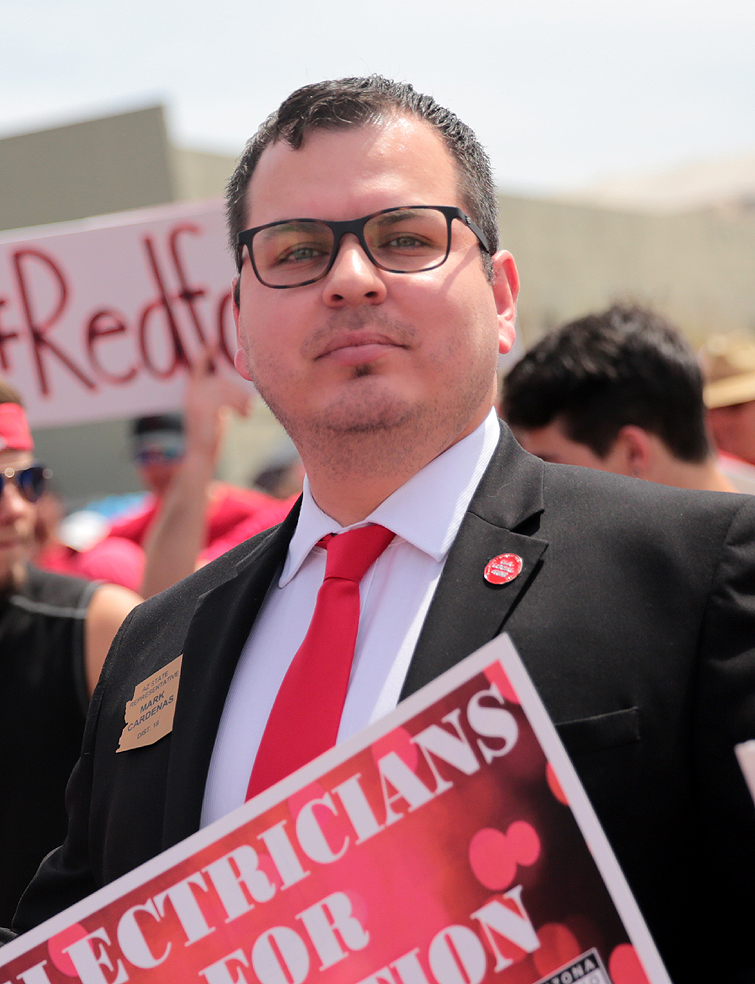
Mark Cardenas

- Rep. Mark Cardenas
- Rep. Charlene Fernandez
- Rep. Randall Friese
- Rep. Rosanna Gabaldón
- Rep. Sally Ann Gonzales
- Sen. Katie Hobbs
- Rep. Jonathan Larkin
- Rep. Stefanie Mach
- Sen. Robert Meza
- Sen. Lynne Pancrazi
- Rep. Rebecca Rios
- Rep. Macario Saldate
- Rep. Victoria Steele (2013–16)
- Sen. Anna Tovar (2013–15)
- Rep. Bruce Wheeler

California

- Ass. Tom Ammiano (2008–14)
- Ass. Cheryl Brown
- Ass. Bill Dodd
- Sen. Isadore Hall III
- Sen. Tom Hayden^{†} (1992–2000)
- Ass. Fabian Núñez, 66th speaker (2004–08)
- Ass. John Pérez, 68th speaker (2010–14)

Colorado

- Sen. Polly Baca (1974–79)
- Sen. Gloria Tanner (1994–2000)
- Rep. Wilma Webb (1980–93)

Connecticut

- Sen. Bill Finch, maj. whip (2000–07)
- Sen. Edward M. Kennedy Jr.

Florida

- Sen. Betty Castor, pres. pro tem. (1985–87)
- Sen. Nan Rich, min. leader (2010–12)
- Sen. Geraldine Thompson

Georgia

- Rep. DuBose Porter (1982–2011)
- Rep. Pam Stephenson
- Sen. Curt Thompson

Idaho

- Rep. Brian Cronin, min. caucus chair (2010–12)
- Rep. Wendy Jaquet, min. leader (1994–2012)

Illinois

- Sen. James Clayborne Jr., maj. leader
- Rep. Gregory S. Harris*
- Rep. Michael Madigan, 67th speaker
- Sen. Iris Martinez, ass. maj. leader

Iowa

- Rep. Ako Abdul-Samad
- Rep. Janet Adams (1987–89)
- Rep. Marti Anderson
- Sen. Staci Appel (2007–11)
- Rep. Timi Brown-Powers
- Sen. Tom Courtney
- Sen. Jeff Danielson
- Sen. Dick Dearden
- Sen. Bill Dotzler
- Sen. Bob Dvorsky
- Rep. Abby Finkenauer
- Rep. Ruth Ann Gaines
- Rep. Mary Gaskill
- Sen. Michael Gronstal, maj. leader
- Rep. Chris C. Hall
- Sen. Johnie Hammond (1994–2002)
- Sen. Rita Hart
- Sen. Wally Horn
- Sen. Pam Jochum, sen. pres.
- Rep. Vicki Lensing
- Rep. Mary Mascher
- Sen. Liz Mathis
- Sen. Matt W. McCoy
- Rep. Helen Miller
- Rep. Jo Oldson
- Rep. Tyler Olson (2007–15)
- Sen. Janet Petersen
- Rep. Kirsten Running-Marquardt
- Rep. Sally Stutsman
- Rep. Phyllis Thede
- Rep. Wes Whitead (2003–11)

Kansas

- Sen. Donald Betts (2003–04)
- Rep. Carolyn Bridges
- Rep. Delia Garcia (2005–10)
- Rep. Sydney Carlin
- Rep. Raj Goyle (2007–11)
- Rep. Nancy Kirk (former)
- Sen. Kelly Kultala (2008–12)
- Sen. Janis Lee, ass. min. leader (1997–2010)
- Sen. Jean Schodorf, maj. whip (2001–13)
- Rep. Sue Storm
- Rep. John Wilson
- Rep. Valdenia Winn

Kentucky

- Rep. Kelly Flood
- Rep. Joni Jenkins
- Rep. Mary Marzian
- Rep. Rita Smart

Louisiana

- Rep. John Bagneris
- Sen. Wesley T. Bishop
- Sen. Gerald Boudreaux
- Rep. Joseph Bouie Jr.
- Sen. Troy E. Brown
- Rep. Barbara Carpenter
- Rep. Gary Carter Jr.
- Sen. Troy Anthony Carter
- Sen. Karen Carter Peterson
- Rep. Kenny Cox
- Sen. Yvonne Dorsey-Colomb
- Rep. Albert Franklin
- Rep. Randal Gaines
- Rep. Jeff W. Hall
- Rep. James Harris, III
- Rep. Marcus Hunter
- Rep. Katrina Jackson
- Rep. Edward James
- Rep. Patrick Jefferson
- Rep. Sam Jenkins
- Rep. Terry Landry Sr.
- Rep. Rodney Lyons
- Rep. C. Denise Marcelle
- Rep. Dustin Miller
- Sen. Marc Morial (1992–94)
- Sen. Jean-Paul Morrell
- Rep. Barbara Norton
- Rep. Vincent Pierre
- Rep. Ed J. Price
- Rep. Patricia Haynes Smith
- Rep. Patrick C. Williams

Maine

- Sen. Justin Alfond, maj. leader
- Rep. Christopher Babbidge
- Sen. Phil Bartlett (2004–12)
- Rep. Henry Beck
- Sen. Emily Cain (2012–14)
- Rep. Mattie Daughtry
- Sen. Cynthia Dill (2011–12)
- Rep. Mark Eves, speaker
- Sen. Ryan Fecteau
- Sen. Stan Gerzofsky
- Rep. Gay Grant
- Sen. Anne Haskell
- Sen. Dawn Hill
- Rep. Erik Jorgensen
- Rep. John L. Martin
- Sen. Libby Mitchell, sen. pres. (2008–10)
- Rep. Matt Moonen
- Sen. Linda Valentino
- Rep. Joan Welsh

Maryland

- Del. Vanessa Atterbeary
- Del. Ben S. Barnes
- Sen. Joanne C. Benson
- Sen. Stewart W. Bainum Jr. (1983–86)
- Del. Aisha Braveboy (2007–15)
- Del. Mark S. Chang
- Del. Bonnie Cullison
- Sen. Howard Denis* (1977–95) (Republican)
- Del. Eric Ebersole
- Del. Diana Fennell
- Sen. Jennie M. Forehand (1995–2014)
- Del. David Fraser-Hidalgo
- Del. Melony Griffith (former)
- Sen. Guy Guzzone
- Del. Shelly Hettleman
- Del. Terri Hill
- Del. Carolyn J. B. Howard
- Del. Jolene Ivey (2003–15)
- Rep. Adrienne A. Jones, speaker pro tem
- Sen. Cheryl Kagan
- Del. Anne Kaiser
- Sen. Delores G. Kelley
- Del. Ariana Kelly
- Sen. Nancy J. King
- Del. Marc Korman
- Del. Benjamin F. Kramer
- Sen. Sidney Kramer (1978–86)
- Del. Clarence Lam
- Sen. Susan C. Lee
- Del. Brooke Lierman
- Sen. Richard Madaleno
- Del. Maggie McIntosh
- Sen. Thomas M. Middleton
- Del. Aruna Miller
- Sen. Thomas V. Miller Jr., sen. pres.
- Sen. Shirley Nathan-Pulliam
- Del. Edith J. Patterson
- Del. Shane Pendergrass
- Del. D. Bruce Poole (1987–99)
- Sen. Catherine Pugh
- Sen. Jamie Raskin,* maj. whip
- Del. Kirill Reznik
- Del. Samuel I. Rosenberg
- Del. Carlo Sanchez
- Del. Luiz R. S. Simmons
- Del. Frank S. Turner
- Del. David Valderrama (1991–03)
- Del. Kris Valderrama
- Del. Jay Walker

Massachusetts

- Rep. James Arciero
- Rep. Brian Ashe
- Rep. Cory Atkins
- Rep. Ruth Balser
- Rep. Christine Barber
- Sen. Michael J. Barrett
- Rep. Jennifer Benson
- Sen. Michael D. Brady
- Rep. Paul Brodeur
- Sen. Will Brownsberger
- Rep. Antonio Cabral
- Rep. Thomas Calter
- Rep. James Cantwell
- Rep. Gailanne Cariddi
- Sen. Harriette L. Chandler, maj. leader
- Sen. Sonia Chang-Díaz*
- Rep. Nick P. Collins
- Rep. Brendan Crighton
- Rep. Claire D. Cronin
- Rep. Dan Cullinane
- Rep. Josh Cutler
- Rep. Michael S. Day
- Rep. Marjorie Decker
- Sen. Sal DiDomenico
- Rep. Dan Donahue
- Rep. Paul Donato
- Sen. Ken Donnelly
- Sen. Eileen Donoghue
- Rep. Carol A. Donovan (1991–2005)
- Sen. Linda Dorcena Forry
- Sen. Benjamin Downing
- Rep. Michelle DuBois
- Rep. Carolyn Dykema
- Rep. Lori Ehrlich
- Rep. Tricia Farley-Bouvier
- Rep. John V. Fernandes
- Rep. Ann-Margaret Ferrante
- Rep. Carole Fiola
- Sen. Barry Finegold (2011–15)
- Sen. Jennifer Flanagan
- Rep. William C. Galvin
- Rep. Sean Garballey
- Rep. Barbara Gardner, maj. whip (1987–2001)
- Sen. Anne Gobi
- Rep. Ken I. Gordon
- Rep. Danielle Gregoire
- Rep. Sherwood Guernsey (former)
- Rep. Patricia Haddad, speaker pro tem
- Rep. Lida E. Harkins (1989–2011)
- Rep. Jon Hecht
- Rep. Paul Heroux
- Rep. Kate Hogan
- Rep. Kevin Honan
- Rep. Daniel J. Hunt
- Rep. Louis Kafka
- Rep. Jay R. Kaufman
- Sen. John F. Keenan
- Rep. Kay Khan
- Rep. Sally Kerans (1991–97)
- Rep. Robert Koczera
- Sen. Barbara L'Italien
- Sen. Eric Lesser
- Sen. Jason M. Lewis
- Rep. Timothy Madden
- Rep. John J. Mahoney
- Rep. Liz Malia
- Rep. Ronald Mariano, maj. leader
- Sen. Thomas M. McGee.
- Rep. Joe McGonagle
- Sen. Joan Menard (2000–11)
- Sen. Michael O. Moore
- Sen. Therese Murray, sen. pres. (2007–15)
- Rep. Harold Naughton Jr.
- Rep. James O'Day
- Sen. Marc R. Pacheco, pres. pro tem
- Rep. Sarah Peake
- Rep. Alice Peisch
- Sen. Anthony Petruccelli
- Rep. William "Smitty" Pignatelli
- Rep. Angelo Puppolo
- Sen. Michael J. Rodrigues
- Rep. David M. Rogers
- Rep. John H. Rogers
- Sen. Stan Rosenberg, sen. pres.
- Rep. Jeffrey Roy
- Rep. Marie St. Fleur (1999–2011)
- Rep. Paul Schmid
- Rep. John Scibak
- Rep. Alan Silvia
- Rep. Frank Smizik
- Rep. Theodore C. Speliotis
- Sen. Karen Spilka
- Rep. John Stefanini (1992–2001)
- Sen. Cynthia Stone Creem
- Rep. Ellen Story
- Rep. William M. Straus
- Rep. Susan Tracy (1991–95)
- Rep. Paul F. Tucker
- Rep. Martha M. Walz (2005–13)
- Sen. James T. Welch
- Rep. Alice Wolf (1996–2013)

Michigan

- Sen. Jim Ananich, Min. Leader
- Rep. Brian R. Banks
- Sen. Steve Bieda
- Rep. Winnie Brinks
- Rep. Charles Brunner
- Rep. John Chirkun
- Rep. Scott Dianda
- Rep. Brandon Dillon (2011–2015)
- Rep. Fred Durhal III
- Rep. Pam Faris
- Rep. LaTanya Garrett
- Rep. Sherry Gay-Dagnogo
- Sen. Vincent Gregory
- Rep. Christine Greig
- Rep. Tim Greimel, min. leader
- Rep. Vanessa Guerra
- Sen. Curtis Hertel Jr.
- Rep. Jon Hoadley
- Sen. David Knezek
- Rep. Robert Kosowski
- Rep. Marilyn Lane
- Rep. Frank Liberati
- Rep. Leslie Love
- Rep. Derek E. Miller
- Rep. Jeremy Allen Moss
- Rep. Kristy Pagan
- Rep. Phil Phelps
- Rep. Sarah Roberts
- Rep. David E. Rutledge
- Rep. Sam Singh
- Rep. Charles Smiley
- Rep. Jim Townsend
- Sen. Gretchen Whitmer, min. leader (2006–2015)
- Rep. Robert Wittenberg

Minnesota

- Rep. Susan Allen
- Rep. Jon Applebaum
- Sen. Terri Bonoff
- Rep. Karen Clark
- Sen. Greg Clausen
- Sen. Dick Cohen
- Rep. Jack Considine
- Sen. Kevin Dahle
- Rep. Raymond Dehn
- Sen. David Scott Dibble
- Sen. Christine Ann Eaton
- Sen. Kent Eken
- Rep. Ron Erhardt
- Rep. Betty Folliard (1997–2002)
- Sen. Melisa Franzen
- Rep. Laurie Halverson
- Rep. Alice Hausman
- Sen. Jeff Hayden, dep. maj. leader
- Rep. Debra Hilstrom
- Sen. John A. Hoffman
- Rep. Frank Hornstein
- Rep. Melissa Hortman, dep. min. leader
- Rep. Jason Isaacson
- Rep. Sheldon Johnson
- Rep. Margaret Anderson Kelliher, 56th speaker (2007–11)
- Rep. Phyllis Kahn
- Sen. Ron Latz
- Rep. John Lesch
- Sen. Becky Lourey (1997–2007)
- Rep. Carlos Mariani
- Rep. Carly Melin
- Rep. Rena Moran
- Rep. Erin Murphy, dep. min. leader
- Sen. Sandy Pappas, sen. pres.
- Rep. Dave Pinto
- Sen. Ann Rest
- Rep. Dan Schoen
- Rep. Yvonne Selcer
- Sen. Kathy Sheran
- Sen. Katie Sieben, ass. maj. leader
- Rep. Erik Simonson
- Rep. Linda Slocum
- Rep. Paul Thissen, min. leader
- Sen. Patricia Torres Ray
- Sen. Chuck Wiger
- Rep. Cheryl Youakim

Mississippi

- Rep. Jeramey Anderson
- Rep. Willie Bailey
- Rep. Earle S. Banks
- Rep. Chris Bell
- Rep. Edward Blackmon Jr.
- Rep. Cedric Burnett
- Sen. Albert Butler
- Rep. Credell Calhoun
- Rep. Kimberly Campbell Buck
- Rep. Bryant Clark
- Rep. Alyce Clarke
- Rep. Linda F. Coleman
- Rep. Mary H. Coleman (1994–2016)
- Sen. Deborah Jeanne Dawkins
- Rep. Oscar Denton
- Rep. Jarvis Dortch
- Rep. Michael T. Evans
- Rep. John Faulkner
- Sen. Hillman Terome Frazier
- Rep. Karl Gibbs
- Rep. John W. Hines
- Rep. Daniel Steven Holland
- Rep. Gregory Holloway Sr.
- Sen. John Horhn
- Rep. Robert Huddleston
- Rep. Lataisha Jackson
- Sen. Robert Jackson
- Sen. Sampson Jackson
- Rep. Robert Johnson III
- Sen. David Lee Jordan
- Rep. Kabir Karriem
- Rep. Carl L. Mickens
- Rep. Chuck Middleton
- Rep. Robert Moak (1984–2016)
- Rep. David Myers
- Sen. Sollie Norwood
- Rep. Orlando Paden
- Rep. Willie Perkins Sr.
- Rep. Tommy Reynolds
- Rep. Sara Richardson Thomas
- Rep. Omeria Scott
- Sen. Derrick Simmons
- Sen. Willie Simmons
- Rep. Rufus Straughter
- Rep. Kathy L. Sykes
- Sen. Angela Turner-Ford
- Rep. Kenneth Walker
- Rep. Percy Watson
- Sen. Gloria Williamson (2000–07)
- Sen. Tammy Witherspoon
- Rep. Adrienne Wooten
- Rep. Charles Young Jr.

Missouri

- Rep. Joe Adams
- Rep. Lauren Arthur
- Rep. Bob Burns
- Sen. Maria Chappelle-Nadal
- Rep. Mike Colona
- Rep. Pat Conway
- Sen. Kiki Curls
- Rep. Randy D. Dunn
- Rep. Rochelle Walton Gray
- Rep. Alan Green
- Sen. Jason Holsman
- Rep. Penny Hubbard
- Rep. Jacob Hummel
- Sen. Joseph Keaveny
- Rep. Kip Kendrick
- Rep. Michele Kratky
- Rep. Jeremy LaFaver
- Rep. Karla May
- Rep. Gail McCann Beatty
- Rep. Tracy McCreery
- Rep. Tommie McDonald
- Rep. DaRon McGee
- Rep. Margo McNeil
- Rep. Bonnaye Mims
- Rep. Gina Mitten
- Rep. Judy Morgan
- Sen. Jamilah Nasheed
- Rep. Stacey Newman
- Rep. Mary Nichols
- Rep. Bill Otto
- Rep. Sharon Pace
- Rep. Josh Peters
- Rep. Tommie Pierson Sr.
- Rep. John Rizzo
- Rep. Joseph Runions
- Sen. Jill Schupp
- Sen. Scott Sifton
- Rep. Betty Thompson, maj. whip (1997–2001)
- Sen. Gina Walsh

Montana

- Rep. Jenny Eck
- Sen. Carol Williams, maj. leader (2011–12)

Nebraska

- Sen. Matt Connealy (1989–2007)
- Sen. Danielle Conrad (2007–15)
- Sen. Tanya Cook
- Sen. Burke Harr
- Sen. Gwen Howard (2005–13)
- Sen. Sara Howard
- Sen. Adam Morfeld
- Sen. Jeremy Nordquist (2009–15)
- Sen. Patty Pansing Brooks

Nevada

- Ass. Elliot Anderson
- Ass. Nelson Araujo
- Sen. Kelvin Atkinson, min. whip
- Ass. Teresa Benitez-Thompson
- Sen. Shirley Breeden (2008–12)
- Ass. Barbara Buckley, speaker (2007–11)
- Ass. Maggie Carlton
- Ass. Olivia Diaz
- Ass. Marilyn Dondero Loop (2009–14)
- Ass. Jason Frierson (2011–14)
- Aaron D. Ford, Nevada Senate min. leader
- Ass. Amber Joiner
- Sen. Justin C. Jones (2012–15)
- Sen. Ruben Kihuen
- Sen. Sheila Leslie (2010–12)
- Ass. Harvey Munford
- Ass. Dina Neal
- Sen. Joe Neal (1972–2004)
- Ass. Richard Perkins, speaker (2001–06)
- Sen. Pat Spearman
- Ass. Ellen Spiegel
- Ass. Michael Sprinkle
- Ass. Odis Thompson
- Sen. Joyce Woodhouse

New Hampshire

- Rep. Michael Abbott
- Rep. Caroletta Alicea
- Rep. Susan Almy
- Rep. Richard Ames
- Rep. Bob Backus
- Rep. Benjamin Baroody
- Rep. Paul Berch
- Rep. Skip Berrien
- Rep. David A. Borden
- Rep. Paula Bradley
- Rep. Pam Brown
- Rep. Rebecca Brown
- Rep. Thomas Buco
- Sen. Peter H. Burling (2004–08)
- Rep. Ed A. Butler
- Rep. Michael Cahill
- Rep. Jacqueline Cali-Pitts
- Rep. Larry Converse
- Rep. Patricia Cornell
- Rep. David Cote
- Sen. Lou D'Allesandro
- Rep. Debbie DiFranco
- Rep. Linda DiSilvestro
- Rep. David Doherty
- Rep. Christy Bartlett
- Rep. Karen Ebel
- Sen. Dan Feltes
- Rep. Paula Francese
- Rep. June Frazer
- Rep. Mary Freitas
- Rep. Ray Gagnon
- Rep. Ken N. Gidge
- Rep. Mary Stuart Gile
- Sen. Peggy Gilmour (2008–10; 2012–14)
- Rep. Carlos Gonzalez (Republican)
- Rep. Pam Gordon
- Rep. Sue Gottling
- Rep. Lee Guerette
- Sen. Mary Louise Hancock (1977–79)
- Rep. William A. Hatch
- Rep. Mary Heath
- Rep. Martha Hennessey
- Sen. Andrew Hosmer
- Rep. Jean Jeudy
- Rep. Gladys Johnsen
- Rep. Naida Kaen
- Rep. David Karrick
- Sen. Molly Kelly
- Rep. Linda Kenison
- Sen. Sylvia Larsen, sen. pres. (2006–10)
- Sen. Bette Lasky
- Rep. Douglas Ley
- Rep. Patricia Lovejoy
- Rep. David Luneau
- Rep. James Mackay
- Rep. Kevin Maes
- Rep. Latha Mangipudi
- Rep. Rebecca McBeath
- Rep. Patricia McMahon (2004–10)
- Rep. Mel Myler
- Rep. Sharon Nordgren
- Rep. Terie Norelli, speaker (2006–10; 2012–14)
- Rep. Andrew O'Hearne
- Rep. Laura Pantelakos
- Rep. William Pearson
- Sen. David M. Pierce
- Rep. Wendy Piper
- Rep. Marjorie Porter
- Rep. Mario Ratzki
- Sen. Deborah Reynolds (2006–10)
- Rep. Harold Rice
- Rep. Kris Roberts
- Rep. Katherine Rogers
- Rep. Deanna Rollo
- Rep. Marge Shephardson
- Rep. Tom Sherman
- Rep. Alexis Simpson
- Rep. Suzanne Smith
- Sen. Donna Soucy
- Rep. Tom Southworth
- Rep. Chris Spirou, min. leader (former)
- Rep. Betty Tamposi, ass. maj. leader (1979–86) (Republican)
- Rep. Yvonne Thomas
- Rep. Susan Treleaven
- Rep. Alan Turcotte
- Rep. James Verschueren
- Rep. Janet Wall
- Rep. Mary Jane Wallner, maj. leader
- Rep. Robert Walsh
- Rep. Gerry Ward
- Rep. Ken Ward
- Sen. David H. Watters
- Rep. Lucy Weber
- Rep. Deborah Wheeler
- Sen. Katie Wheeler (1996–2002)
- Rep. Kermit Williams
- Sen. Jeff Woodburn, min. leader
- Rep. David Woodbury

New Jersey

- Ass. Annette Chaparro
- Sen. Richard Codey
- Sen. Nilsa Cruz-Perez
- Sen. Sandra Cunningham
- Ass. Joann Downey
- Ass. Patricia Egan Jones
- Sen. Nia Gill, Pres. pro tem.
- Sen. Robert M. Gordon
- Ass. Gerald B. Green, speaker pro tem
- Sen. Linda R. Greenstein
- Ass. Louis Greenwald, maj. leader
- Ass. Valerie Huttle
- Ass. Angelica M. Jimenez
- Ass. LeRoy J. Jones Jr. (1994–2000)
- Ass. Pamela R. Lampitt
- Sen. Raymond Lesniak
- Sen. Fred H. Madden
- Ass. Elizabeth Maher Muoio
- Ass. Angela V. McKnight
- Ass. Gabriela Mosquera
- Ass. Sheila Oliver
- Ass. Eliana Pintor Marin
- Sen. Nellie Pou
- Ass. Vincent Prieto, speaker
- Ass. Joan M. Quigley, maj. leader (2006–08)
- Ass. Annette Quijano
- Sen. M. Teresa Ruiz
- Sen. Nicholas Sacco
- Sen. Paul Sarlo
- Ass. Troy Singleton
- Ass. L. Grace Spencer
- Ass. Shavonda Sumter
- Sen. Stephen M. Sweeney, sen. pres.
- Ass. Cleopatra Tucker
- Sen. Loretta Weinberg, maj. leader
- Ass. John Wisniewski*

New Mexico

- Sen. Jacob Candelaria
- Rep. Joni Gutierrez (2005–13)
- Rep. W. Ken Martinez
- Rep. Bill McCamley
- Rep. Raymond G. Sanchez, speaker (1971–2000)

New York

- Sen. Michael Balboni* (1998–2007) (Republican)
- Ass. Michael Blake
- Ass. Harry Bronson
- Ass. David Buchwald
- Ass. Marcos Crespo
- Ass. Jeffrey Dinowitz
- Sen. Adriano Espaillat
- Ass. Herman Farrell
- Ass. David F. Gantt
- Sen. Michael Gianaris
- Ass. Mark Gjonaj
- Ass. Deborah J. Glick
- Ass. Carl Heastie, speaker
- Ass. Earlene Hooper
- Sen. Brad Hoylman
- Ass. Ellen Jaffee
- Ass. Ron T.S. Kim
- Ass. Shelley Mayer
- Ass. Joseph Morelle, maj. leader
- Ass. Daniel J. O'Donnell
- Ass. Amy Paulin
- Ass. Crystal Peoples
- Ass. N. Nick Perry
- Ass. J. Gary Pretlow
- Ass. Dan Quart
- Ass. Philip Ramos
- Ass. Annette Robinson
- Ass. Sean Ryan
- Ass. Robin Schimminger
- Ass. Rebecca Seawright
- Ass. Jo Anne Simon
- Ass. James Skoufis
- Sen. Daniel Squadron*
- Sen. Andrea Stewart-Cousins, Min. Leader
- Ass. Matthew Titone
- Ass. Keith L.T. Wright
- Ass. Kenneth Zebrowski Jr.

North Carolina

- Rep. Gale Adcock
- Rep. John Ager
- Sen. Daniel T. Blue Jr., min. leader
- Rep. Cecil Brockman
- Sen. Angela Bryant
- Rep. Becky Carney
- Rep. Carla Cunningham
- Rep. Beverly M. Earle
- Rep. Jean Farmer-Butterfield
- Rep. Susan C. Fisher, dep. min. leader
- Rep. Rosa Gill
- Rep. Charles Graham
- Rep. George Graham
- Rep. Duane Hall
- Rep. Larry D. Hall, min. leader
- Rep. Susi Hamilton
- Rep. Pricey Harrison
- Rep. Yvonne Lewis Holley
- Rep. Howard J. Hunter III
- Rep. Verla C. Insko
- Rep. Darren G. Jackson
- Rep. Ralph C. Johnson
- Sen. Paul A. Lowe Jr.
- Rep. Marvin W. Lucas
- Rep. Grier Martin
- Sen. Floyd McKissick Jr.
- Rep. Graig R. Meyer
- Rep. Mickey Michaux
- Rep. Rodney W. Moore
- Rep. Garland E. Pierce
- Rep. Joe Sam Queen
- Rep. William O. Richardson
- Rep. Bobbie Richardson
- Sen. Gladys A. Robinson
- Rep. Deborah K. Ross (2003–13)
- Sen. Jane Smith
- Sen. Erica Smith-Ingram
- Sen. Josh Stein
- Rep. Evelyn Terry
- Sen. Terry Van Duyn, min. whip
- Sen. Joyce Waddell
- Rep. Shelly Willingham
- Sen. Mike Woodard

North Dakota

- Rep. Kenton Onstad, min. leader
- Sen. Mac Schneider, min. leader

Ohio

- Rep. Nickie Antonio
- Rep. Michael Ashford
- Rep. Heather Bishoff
- Rep. John Boccieri
- Rep. Kristin Boggs
- Rep. Janine Boyd
- Rep. Nicholas J. Celebrezze
- Rep. Jack Cera
- Rep. Kathleen Clyde
- Rep. Michael Curtin
- Rep. Denise Driehaus
- Rep. Teresa Fedor
- Sen. Lou Gentile
- Rep. Tracy Heard, maj. leader (2009–11)
- Rep. Stephanie Howse
- Rep. Greta Johnson
- Rep. David J. Leland
- Rep. Michele Lepore-Hagan
- Sen. Rhine McLin (1995–01)
- Rep. John Patterson
- Rep. Debbie Phillips
- Rep. Connie Pillich (2009–14)
- Rep. Alicia Reece
- Sen. Joe Schiavoni
- Rep. Michael Sheehy
- Rep. Stephen Slesnick
- Rep. Kent Smith
- Rep. Martin J. Sweeney
- Sen. Charleta Tavares
- Sen. Cecil L. Thomas
- Sen. Sandra Williams
- Sen. Kenny Yuko

Oklahoma'

- Sen. Laura Boyd (1993–98)
- Rep. Jason Dunnington
- Sen. Kay Floyd
- Rep. James Lockhart
- Rep. Jeannie McDaniel
- Sen. Anastasia Pittman
- Sen. John Sparks, min. leader
- Rep. Emily Virgin
- Rep. George E. Young

Oregon

- Rep. Joe Gallegos
- Rep. Tina Kotek,* 68th speaker

Pennsylvania

- Rep. Leslie Acosta
- Rep. Bryan Barbin
- Sen. John P. Blake
- Sen. Lisa Boscola
- Rep. Kevin J. Boyle
- Sen. Jim Brewster
- Rep. Donna Bullock
- Rep. Thomas Caltagirone
- Rep. Michael B. Carroll
- Rep. Tonyelle Cook-Artis
- Rep. John Cordisco (1981–86)
- Rep. Dom Costa
- Sen. Jay Costa, min. leader
- Rep. Mary Jo Daley
- Rep. Margo L. Davidson
- Rep. Erroll Davis (1971–72)
- Rep. Tina Davis
- Rep. Madeleine Dean
- Rep. Dan Deasy
- Rep. Pam DeLissio
- Rep. Frank Dermody, min. leader
- Sen. Andy Dinniman
- Rep. Maria Donatucci
- Rep. Ronald Donatucci (1977–80)
- Rep. Michael Driscoll
- Rep. Dwight E. Evans
- Rep. Flo Fabrizio
- Sen. Larry Farnese
- Sen. Wayne D. Fontana
- Rep. Dan Frankel
- Rep. Edward Gainey
- Rep. John Galloway
- Rep. Michael F. Gerber (2005–13)
- Rep. Neal Goodman
- Rep. Lois Sherman Hagarty* (1980–92) (Republican)
- Rep. Mike Hanna, min. whip
- Rep. Pat Harkins
- Sen. Vincent Hughes
- Rep. Patty Kim
- Rep. Stephen Kinsey
- Rep. Thaddeus Kirkland
- Sen. Shirley Kitchen
- Rep. Leanne Krueger-Braneky
- Sen. Daylin Leach
- Rep. Joe Markosek
- Rep. Robert Matzie
- Rep. Joanna E. McClinton
- Sen. Jack McGregor (1963–70) (Republican)
- Rep. Daniel McNeill
- Rep. Sid Michaels Kavulich
- Rep. Ed Neilson
- Rep. Eddie Day Pashinski
- Rep. Harry Readshaw
- Rep. T.J. Rooney (1993–2006)
- Sen. John Sabatina
- Rep. Lynwood Savage
- Rep. Michael Schlossberg
- Sen. Judy Schwank
- Rep. Peter Schweyer
- Rep. Brian Sims
- Sen. Milton Street* (1981–84)
- Rep. Mike Sturla
- Sen. Christine Tartaglione
- Sen. Rob Teplitz
- Rep. Curtis Thomas
- Sen. Sean Wiley
- Sen. Anthony H. Williams, min. whip
- Sen. John N. Wozniak
- Rep. Rosita Youngblood
- Sen. John Yudichak

Puerto Rico

- Sen. Margarita Nolasco Santiago
- Sen. Roberto Prats (2000–04)
- Sen. Carmelo Ríos Santiago

Rhode Island

- Rep. Grace Diaz
- Rep. Joseph M. McNamara
- Sen. Adam Satchell

South Carolina

- Sen. Karl B. Allen
- Rep. Carl L. Anderson
- Rep. Jimmy Bales
- Sen. Margie Bright Matthews
- Rep. Boyd Brown (2009–13)
- Rep. Robert Brown
- Rep. Bill Clyburn
- Sen. Creighton Coleman
- Rep. Chandra Dillard
- Rep. Jerry Govan Jr.
- Rep. Pat Henegan
- Rep. Leon Howard
- Sen. Brad Hutto
- Sen. Darrell Jackson
- Rep. Joseph H. Jefferson
- Rep. I. S. Leevy Johnson (1971–1980)
- Sen. Kevin L. Johnson
- Sen. Marlon Kimpson
- Rep. John King
- Sen. Phil P. Leventis (1980–2012)
- Rep. David J. Mack
- Sen. John W. Matthews Jr.
- Rep. Mia McLeod
- Rep. Walton McLeod
- Rep. Harold Mitchell Jr.
- Sen. Kay Patterson (1985–2008)
- Rep. Mandy Powers Norrell
- Rep. Leola C. Robinson-Simpson
- Rep. Tim Rogers (former)
- Rep. Todd Rutherford, min. leader
- Sen. Ronnie A. Sabb
- Rep. Bakari Sellers (2006–14)
- Sen. John L. Scott Jr.
- Sen. Linda H. Short (1992–2007)
- Rep. James E. Smith Jr., dep. min. leader
- Rep. Levola Taylor (1991–92)
- Rep. J. David Weeks
- Sen. McKinley Washington Jr. (1990–2000)
- Rep. Lucille Whipper (1986–96)
- Rep. Seth Whipper

South Dakota

- Rep. Julie Bartling, ass. min. leader
- Rep. Shawn Bordeaux
- Sen. Jim Bradford
- Sen. Angie Buhl-O'Donnell
- Rep. Dennis Feickert
- Sen. Jason Frerichs, min. leader
- Rep. Peggy Gibson
- Rep. Paula Hawks
- Rep. Spencer Hawley, min. leader
- Rep. Kevin Killer
- Rep. Steven McCleerey
- Sen. Scott Parsley
- Sen. James R. Peterson
- Rep. Dean Schrempp
- Rep. Karen Soli
- Sen. Billie Sutton, ass. min. leader

Tennessee

- Rep. Raumesh Akbari
- Rep. Bill Beck
- Rep. John Ray Clemmons
- Rep. JoAnne Favors
- Rep. Craig Fitzhugh, min. leader
- Rep. Brenda Gilmore
- Rep. G. A. Hardaway
- Sen. Thelma M. Harper
- Rep. Sherry Jones
- Sen. Sara Kyle
- Rep. John Litz (2003–10)
- Rep. Harold Love
- Rep. Larry J. Miller
- Rep. Bo Mitchell
- Rep. Antonio Parkinson
- Rep. Johnny Shaw
- Rep. Joe Towns
- Rep. Johnnie Turner

Texas

- Rep. Alma A. Allen
- Rep. Roberto R. Alonzo
- Rep. Carol Alvarado
- Rep. Rafael Anchia
- Rep.-Elect Diana Arevalo
- Sen. Gonzalo Barrientos (1985–2007)
- Rep. Diego Bernal
- Rep. Cesar Blanco
- Rep. Valinda Bolton (2007–10)
- Rep. Terry Canales
- Rep. Garnet Coleman
- Rep. Nicole Collier
- Sen. Wendy Davis (2009–15)
- Rep. Joe Deshotel
- Rep. Harryette Ehrhardt (1995–2002)
- Sen. Rodney Ellis
- Rep. Jessica Farrar
- Sen. Sylvia Garcia
- Rep. Helen Giddings
- Rep. Mary González
- Rep. Sherri Greenberg (1991–2001)
- Rep. Robert Guerra
- Rep. Ana Hernandez
- Rep. Abel Herrero
- Sen. Juan Hinojosa, Pres. pro tem.
- Rep. Donna Howard
- Rep. Celia Israel
- Rep. Eric Johnson
- Rep. Oscar Longoria
- Rep. Eddie Lucio III
- Sen. Jose Menendez*
- Rep. Mando Martinez
- Rep. Ina Minjarez
- Rep. Joe E. Moody
- Rep. Sergio Muñoz Jr.
- Rep. Elliott Naishtat
- Rep. Poncho Nevárez
- Rep. Rene Oliveira
- Rep. Richard P. Raymond
- Rep. Eddie R. Rodriguez
- Sen. José R. Rodríguez
- Rep. Justin Rodriguez
- Rep. Ramon Romero Jr.
- Rep. Toni Rose
- Rep. Chris Turner
- Sen. Carlos Uresti
- Sen. Leticia Van de Putte (1999–2015)
- Rep. Hubert Vo
- Rep. Armando Walle, dep. floor leader
- Sen. Kirk Watson
- Sen. Royce West
- Sen. John Whitmire
- Rep. Gene Wu

Utah

- Rep. Patrice M. Arent
- Rep. David Irvine (former) (Republican)
- Sen. Ross I. Romero (2006–12)

Vermont

- Rep. Sarah E. Buxton
- Rep. Maxine Grad

Virginia

- Del. Lashrecse Aird
- Sen. Kenneth C. Alexander
- Del. Lamont Bagby
- Del. John Bell*
- Sen. Rosalyn Dance
- Del. Eileen Filler-Corn
- Del. Matthew James
- Del. Mark Keam
- Del. Joseph C. Lindsey
- Sen. Mamie Locke
- Del. Alfonso H. Lopez
- Sen. Louise Lucas
- Sen. David W. Marsden
- Del. Monty Mason
- Del. Jennifer McClellan
- Sen. A. Donald McEachin
- Del. Delores McQuinn
- Del. Kathleen J. Murphy*
- Del. Daun Sessoms Hester
- Del. Lionell Spruill
- Del. Scott Surovell
- Del. Luke Torian
- Del. Roslyn Tyler
- Del. Jeion Ward
- Sen. Jennifer Wexton*

Washington

- Rep. Sherry Appleton
- Rep. Steve Bergquist
- Sen. Andy Billig
- Sen. Annette Cleveland
- Rep. Judy Clibborn
- Rep. Eileen Cody
- Sen. Jeannie Darneille
- Rep. Jake Fey
- Rep. Joe Fitzgibbon
- Sen. David Frockt
- Sen. Cyrus Habib, Min. Whip
- Rep. Drew Hansen
- Sen. Steve Hobbs
- Rep. Zack Hudgins
- Rep. Sam W. Hunt
- Rep. Christopher Hurst
- Sen. Pramila Jayapal*
- Sen. Laurie Jinkins
- Sen. Karen Keiser
- Rep. Patty Kuderer
- Sen. Marko Liias
- Rep. Kristine Lytton
- Rep. Joan McBride
- Sen. John R. McCoy
- Rep. Jim Moeller
- Rep. Jeff R. Morris
- Sen. Mark Mullet
- Sen. Sharon Nelson
- Rep. Lillian Ortiz-Self
- Rep. Tina Orwall
- Sen. Jamie Pedersen
- Rep. Strom Peterson
- Rep. Eric Pettigrew
- Rep. Gerry Pollet
- Sen. Kevin Ranker
- Rep. June Robinson
- Rep. Cindy Ryu
- Rep. Tana Senn
- Rep. Larry Springer
- Rep. Derek Stanford
- Rep. Gael Tarleton
- Rep. Steve Tharinger
- Rep. Brady Walkinshaw
- Rep. Sharon Wylie

West Virginia

- Sen. Jeff Kessler, Min. Leader

Wisconsin

- Ass. Peter Barca, min. leader
- Ass. Mandela Barnes
- Ass. Terese Berceau
- Sen. Janet Bewley
- Sen. Tim Carpenter
- Ass. Chris Danou
- Ass. Steve Doyle
- Sen. Jon Erpenbach
- Ass. Eric Genrich*
- Ass. Evan Goyke
- Ass. Dianne Hesselbein
- Ass. Gordon Hintz
- Ass. La Tonya Johnson
- Ass. Robb Kahl
- Ass. Fred Kessler
- Ass. Debra Kolste
- Sen. Julie Lassa
- Ass. Cory Mason
- Ass. Beth Meyers
- Ass. Sondy Pope-Roberts
- Ass. Daniel Riemer
- Sen. Janis Ringhand
- Sen. Jennifer Shilling, min. leader
- Ass. Christine Sinicki
- Ass. Amanda Stuck
- Ass. Lisa Subeck
- Ass. Chris Taylor
- Sen. Lena Taylor
- Ass. Dana Wachs
- Ass. Leon Young
- Ass. JoCasta Zamarripa
- Ass. Josh Zepnick

Wyoming

- Rep. James W. Byrd
- Rep. JoAnn Dayton
- Rep. Ken Esquibel
- Sen. Floyd Esquibel
- Rep. Mary Hales (2007–10)
- Rep. Andy Schwartz
- Rep. Mary Throne, min. leader

=== Former members of state judiciaries ===
- Paul Anderson, associate justice, Minnesota Supreme Court (1994–2013) (Republican)
- Charles Fried, associate justice, Massachusetts Supreme Judicial Court (1995–99) (Republican)
- Alan C. Page, associate justice, Minnesota Supreme Court (1993–2015)
- Robert S. Smith, associate judge, New York Court of Appeals (2004–14) (Republican)

== Municipal and county officials ==
=== Mayors, county executives, and tribal leaders ===
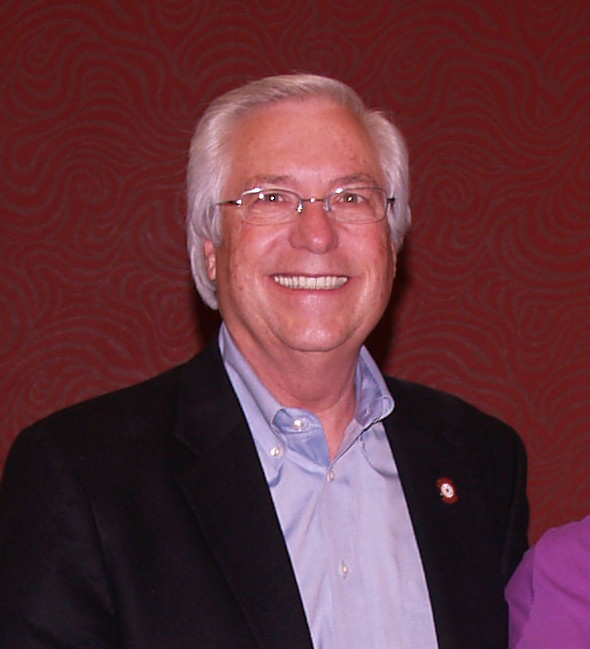
Bill John Baker

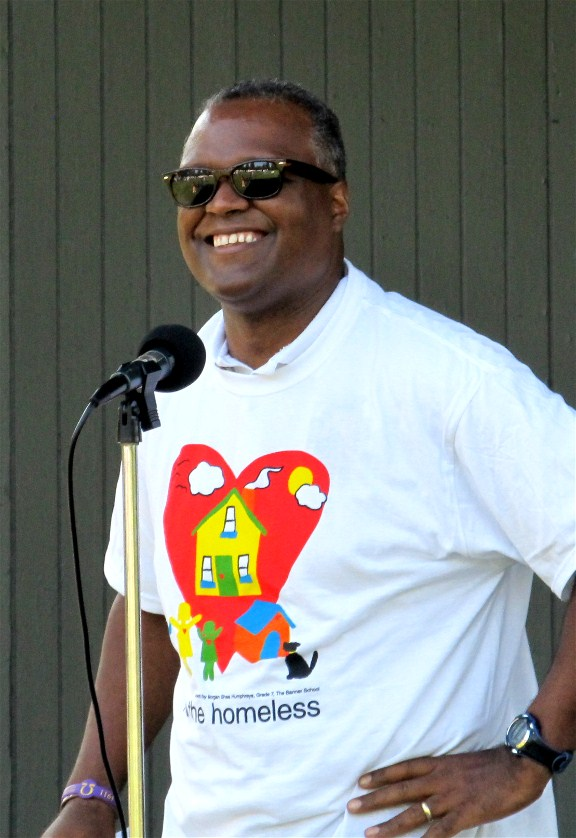
Rushern Baker

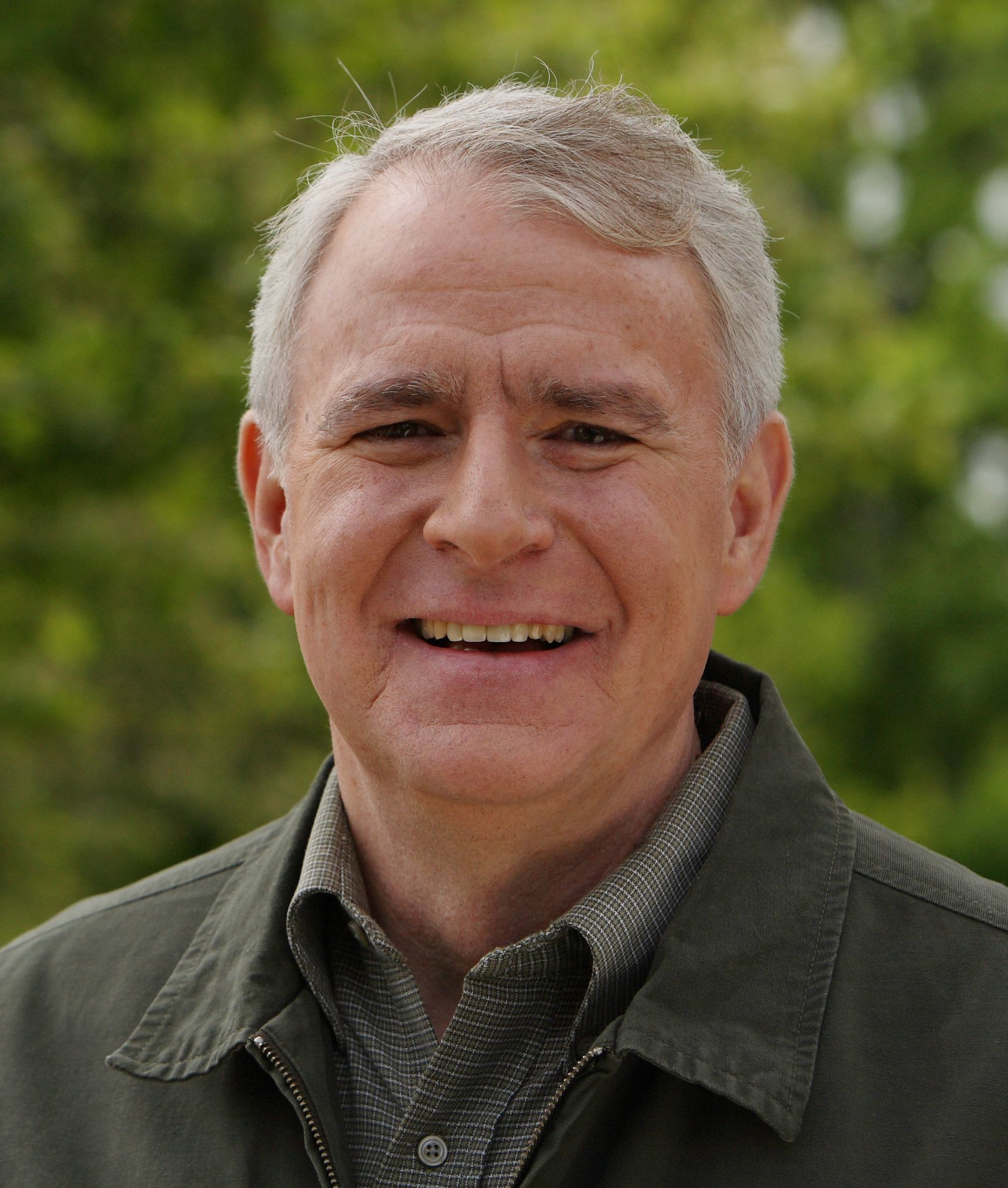
Tom Barrett

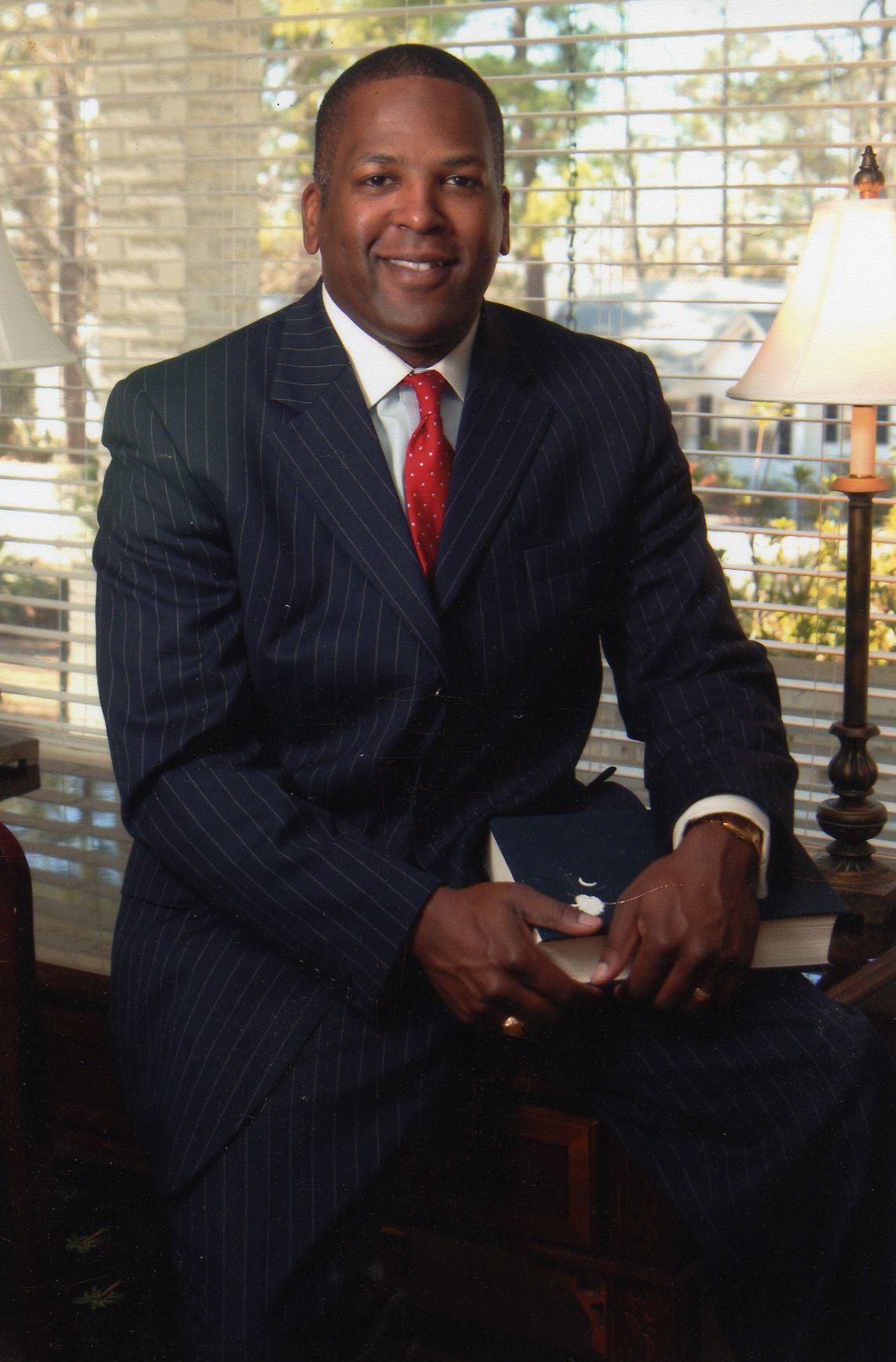
Stephen K. Benjamin

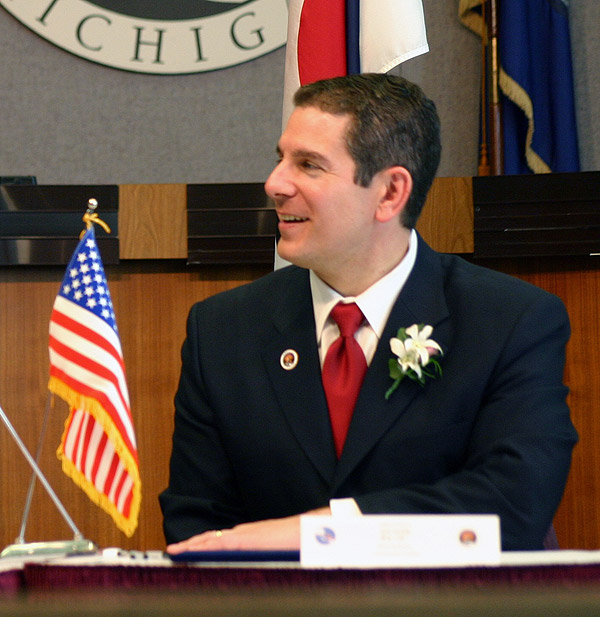
Virgil Bernero

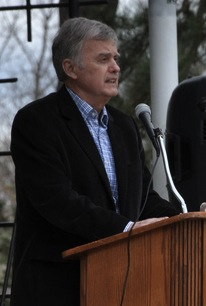
Chris Beutler

Current

- Chris Abele,* 6th Milwaukee County, Wisconsin executive
- Steve Adler, mayor of Austin, Texas
- Bill John Baker, 7th principal chief of the Cherokee Nation
- Rushern Baker,* 7th executive of Prince George's County, Maryland
- Tom Barrett, 44th mayor of Milwaukee
- Megan Barry, 7th mayor of Nashville and Davidson County, Tennessee
- Russell Begaye,* 8th president of the Navajo Nation
- Bill Bell, mayor of Durham, North Carolina
- William A. Bell, 28th mayor of Birmingham, Alabama
- Steve Bellone, 8th Suffolk County, New York executive
- Melanie Benjamin, Mille Lacs Band of Ojibwe chief executive
- Stephen K. Benjamin, 36th mayor of Columbia, South Carolina
- Virgil Bernero, mayor of Lansing, Michigan
- Chris Beutler, 51st mayor of Lincoln, Nebraska
- David H. Bieter, mayor of Boise
- Percy Bland, mayor of Meridian, Mississippi
- Jackie Biskupski, 35th mayor of Salt Lake City
- Bill de Blasio, 109th mayor of New York City
- Chris Bollwage, mayor of Elizabeth, New Jersey
- Muriel Bowser, 8th mayor of the District of Columbia
- Noam Bramson, mayor of New Rochelle, New York
- Ardell Brede, 44th mayor of Rochester, Minnesota
- Gale Brewer, 27th New York County, New York president
- John Bridgeman, mayor of Gastonia, North Carolina
- Luke Bronin, mayor of Hartford
- Aja Brown, 18th mayor of Compton, California
- Byron Brown, 62nd mayor of Buffalo
- Bob Buckhorn, 56th mayor of Tampa, Florida
- Armond Budish, 2nd Cuyahoga County, Ohio Executive
- Roy D. Buol, mayor of Dubuque, Iowa
- Pete Buttigieg, mayor of South Bend, Indiana
- Christopher Cabaldon, mayor of West Sacramento, California
- Kirk Caldwell, 14th mayor of Honolulu
- Shari Cantor, mayor of West Hartford, Connecticut
- Chris Coleman, 54th mayor of St. Paul
- Dow Constantine, 8th King County, Washington executive
- David Coulter, mayor of Ferndale, Michigan
- John Cranley, 69th mayor of Cincinnati
- Rubén Díaz Jr., 13th Bronx County, New York president
- Wilda Diaz, mayor of Perth Amboy, New Jersey
- Robert J. Dolan, mayor of Melrose, Massachusetts
- Kimberley Driscoll, 50th mayor of Salem, Massachusetts
- Mike Duggan, 75th mayor of Detroit
- Johnny DuPree, mayor of Hattiesburg, Mississippi
- Buddy Dyer, 32nd mayor of Orlando
- Jorge Elorza, 38th mayor of Providence
- Rahm Emanuel, 55th mayor of Chicago
- Warren Evans, Wayne County, Michigan executive
- John Fetterman,* mayor of Braddock, Pennsylvania
- Greg Fischer, 2nd mayor of Louisville and Jefferson County, Kentucky
- Rich Fitzgerald, Allegheny County, Pennsylvania executive
- Johnny Ford, mayor of Tuskegee, Alabama
- Karen Freeman-Wilson, 19th mayor of Gary, Indiana
- Steven Fulop, 49th mayor of Jersey City, New Jersey
- Joseph P. Ganim, 51st & 54th mayor of Bridgeport, Connecticut
- Eric Garcetti, 42nd mayor of Los Angeles
- Robert Garcia, 28th mayor of Long Beach, California
- Andrew Gillum, mayor of Tallahassee, Florida
- Carlos A. Giménez,* mayor of Miami-Dade County, Florida (Republican)
- Andrew Ginther, 53rd mayor of Columbus, Ohio
- Javier Gonzales, 42nd mayor of Santa Fe
- Mark Hackel, 1st Macomb County, Michigan executive
- Michael Hancock, 45th mayor of Denver
- Toni Harp, 50th mayor of New Haven, Connecticut
- Mike Hein, 1st Ulster County, New York executive
- Pam Hemminger, mayor of Chapel Hill, North Carolina
- Tom Henry, 35th mayor of Fort Wayne, Indiana
- Paula Hicks-Hudson, 63rd mayor of Toledo
- Betsy Hodges, 47th mayor of Minneapolis
- Joe Hogsett, 49th mayor of Indianapolis
- John Hollar, mayor of Montpelier, Vermont
- Dan Horrigan, 62nd mayor of Akron, Ohio
- Mike Huether, mayor of Sioux Falls, South Dakota
- Sly James, 54th mayor of Kansas City, Missouri
- Kevin Johnson, 55th mayor of Sacramento
- Allen Joines,* 17th mayor of Winston-Salem
- Dwight Jones, 79th mayor of Richmond
- Melinda Katz, 19th Queens County, New York president
- Jim Kenney, 99th mayor of Philadelphia
- Rick Kriseman, mayor of St. Petersburg, Florida
- Mitch Landrieu, 61st mayor of New Orleans
- Edwin M. Lee, 43rd mayor of San Francisco
- Ike Leggett, 6th Montgomery County, Maryland executive
- Philip Levine, mayor of Miami Beach, Florida
- Sam Liccardo, 65th mayor of San Jose
- Esther Manheimer, mayor of Asheville, North Carolina
- David Martin, 37th mayor of Stamford, Connecticut
- Jamie Mayo, mayor of Monroe, Louisiana
- Ben McAdams, mayor of Salt Lake County, Utah
- Thomas McDermott Jr., 20th mayor of Hammond, Indiana
- Kim McMillan, mayor of Clarksville, Tennessee
- María Meléndez, 135th mayor of Ponce, Puerto Rico
- Wayne Messam, mayor of Miramar, Florida
- Stephanie Miner, 53rd mayor of Syracuse
- Connie Moran, mayor of Ocean Springs, Mississippi
- Alex B. Morse, mayor of Holyoke, Massachusetts
- Ed Murray, 53rd mayor of Seattle
- Svante Myrick, mayor of Ithaca, New York
- Neil O'Leary, mayor of Waterbury, Connecticut
- William Peduto, 60th mayor of Pittsburgh
- Joseph Petty, 72nd mayor of Worcester, Massachusetts
- Donald Pilon, mayor of Saco, Maine
- McKinley L. Price, mayor of Newport News, Virginia
- Michael D. Quill Sr., mayor of Auburn, New York
- Stephanie Rawlings-Blake,* mayor of Baltimore
- Dana Redd, 47th mayor of Camden, New Jersey
- Kasim Reed, 59th mayor of Atlanta
- Harry Rilling, 40th mayor of Norwalk, Connecticut
- Dan Rivera, mayor of Lawrence, Massachusetts
- Thomas Roach, mayor of White Plains, New York
- Jennifer Roberts, 58th mayor of Charlotte
- Terence Roberts, mayor of Anderson, South Carolina
- Jonathan Rothschild, 41st mayor of Tucson, Arizona
- Domenic Sarno, 55th mayor of Springfield, Massachusetts
- Brad Sellers, mayor of Warrensville Heights, Ohio
- Libby Schaaf, 50th mayor of Oakland
- Hillary Schieve,* mayor of Reno (Independent)
- Kathy Sheehan, 75th mayor of Albany
- Joseph Sinnott, 47th mayor of Erie, Pennsylvania
- Francis Slay, 45th mayor of St. Louis
- Mike Spano, mayor of Yonkers, New York
- Greg Stanton, 59th mayor of Phoenix
- Steve Stenger, 8th St. Louis County, Missouri Executive
- Mark Stodola, mayor of Little Rock, Arkansas
- Marilyn Strickland, mayor of Tacoma, Washington
- Elizabeth Tisdahl, mayor of Evanston, Illinois
- Sylvester Turner, 62nd mayor of Houston
- Dennis Tyler, mayor of Muncie, Indiana
- Nancy Vaughan, mayor of Greensboro, North Carolina
- Marty Walsh, 54th mayor of Boston
- Lovely Warren, 67th mayor of Rochester
- Setti Warren, mayor of Newton, Massachusetts
- Karen Weaver, mayor of Flint, Michigan
- Miro Weinberger, mayor of Burlington, Vermont
- Dennis P. Williams, 55th mayor of Wilmington, Delaware
- Nan Whaley, mayor of Dayton, Ohio
- Tony Yarber, 52nd mayor of Jackson, Mississippi

Former

- Dennis Archer, 71st mayor of Detroit (1994–2001)
- Kay Barnes, 52nd mayor of Kansas City, Missouri (1999–2007)
- Michael Bloomberg,* (Note: Member of the Forbes 400) 108th mayor of New York City (2002–13) (Independent)
- David A. Bowers, mayor of Roanoke, Virginia
- Alvin Brown, mayor of Jacksonville, Florida (2011–15)
- Linda Chapin, 1st Orange County, Florida commission chair (1990–99)
- Martin Chávez, 26th & 28th mayor of Albuquerque (1993–97, 2001–09)
- Jun Choi, mayor of Edison, New Jersey (2006–10)
- Bob Coble, 35th mayor of Columbia, South Carolina (1990–2010)
- Michael B. Coleman, 52nd mayor of Columbus, Ohio (2000–16)
- Manny Díaz, 41st mayor of Miami (2001–09)
- David Dinkins, 106th mayor of New York City (1990–93)
- Sheila Dixon, 48th mayor of Baltimore (2007–10)
- William D. Euille, mayor of Alexandria, Virginia (2003–16)
- C. Virginia Fields, 25th New York County, New York president (1998–2005)
- Paul D. Fraim, mayor of Hampton, Virginia
- Shirley Franklin, 58th Mayor of Atlanta (2002–10)
- Sandra Freedman, 53rd Mayor of Tampa (1986–95)
- Joel Giambra,* 6th Erie County, New York Executive (2000–07) (Republican)
- Gilberto Hinojosa, Cameron County, Texas county judge (1995–2007)
- Gerald Jennings, 74th mayor of Albany (1994–2013)
- Jan Laverty Jones, 20th mayor of Las Vegas (1991–99)
- Sukhee Kang, mayor of Irvine, California (2008–12)
- Ted Leonsis,* mayor of Orchid, Florida (1990–94)
- Mark Mallory, 68th mayor of Cincinnati (2005–13)
- Raúl L. Martínez, mayor of Hialeah, Florida (1981–2005)
- Anthony Masiello, 61st mayor of Buffalo (1994–2005)
- Ellen Moyer, mayor of Annapolis, Maryland (2001–09)
- Michael Nutter, 98th mayor of Philadelphia (2008–16)
- Douglas Harold Palmer, 45th mayor of Trenton, New Jersey (1990–10)
- Joseph R. Paolino Jr., 33rd mayor of Providence, Rhode Island (1984–91)
- Annise Parker, 61st mayor of Houston (2003–16)
- James Perkins Jr., mayor of Selma, Alabama (2000–08)
- Roxanne Qualls, 66th mayor of Cincinnati (1993–99)
- Joseph P. Riley Jr., 60th mayor of Charleston, South Carolina
- Mike Sanders, Jackson County, Missouri executive
- Lottie Shackelford, mayor of Little Rock, Arkansas (1987–88)
- Scott Slifka, mayor of West Hartford, Connecticut
- Jim Suttle, 50th mayor of Omaha (2009–13)
- Kathy Taylor, 38th mayor of Tulsa, Oklahoma (2006–09)
- Linda D. Thompson, mayor of Harrisburg, Pennsylvania
- Antonio Villaraigosa, 41st mayor of Los Angeles (2005–13)
- Dayne Walling, 92nd mayor of Flint, Michigan (2009–15)
- Wellington Webb, 42nd mayor of Denver (1991–2003)
- A C Wharton, 63rd mayor of Memphis (2009–15)
- Bill White, 60th mayor of Houston (2004–10)
- Ted Wilson, 30th mayor of Salt Lake City (1976–85)
- Lisa Wong, mayor of Fitchburg, Massachusetts
- Peterson Zah, 1st president of the Navajo Nation (1991–1995) and 11th chairman of the Navajo Nation (1983–1987)

=== Municipal and county executive officials ===
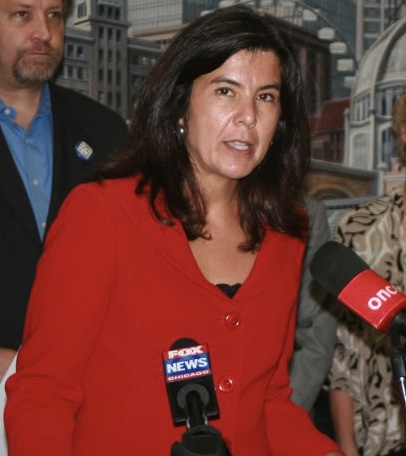
Anita Alvarez

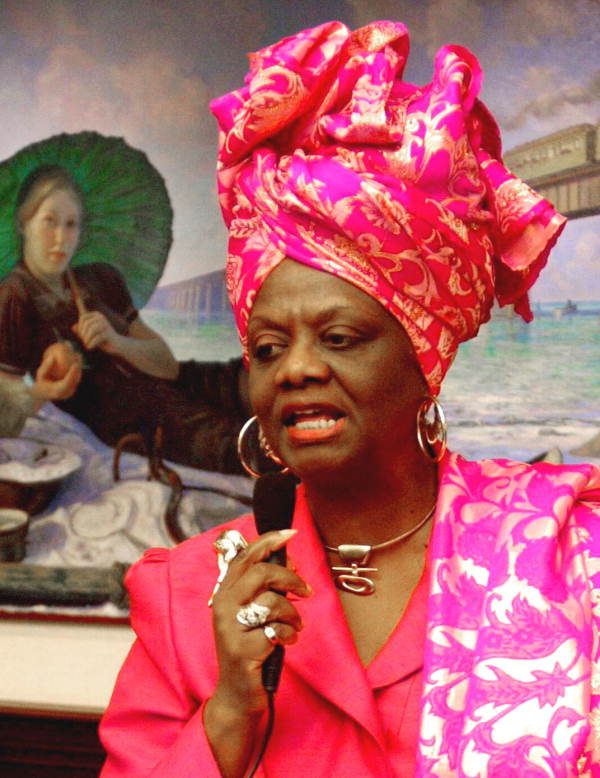
Dorothy Bendross-Mindingall

Current

- Anita Alvarez, Cook County, Illinois, state's attorney
- Dave Aronberg, Palm Beach County, Florida state's attorney
- Michael G. Bellotti, Norfolk County, Massachusetts sheriff
- Dorothy Bendross-Mindingall, Miami-Dade County, Florida School Board
- Joseph Berrios, Cook County, Illinois assessor
- Lisa Brown, Oakland County, Michigan clerk
- Michael D. Brown, Washington, D.C. shadow senator (Independent)
- Barbara Byrum, Ingham County, Michigan clerk
- Carmen Chu, San Francisco assessor
- Deborah Cherry, Genesee County, Michigan treasurer
- John Ewing, Douglas County, Nebraska treasurer
- Katherine Fernandez Rundle, Miami-Dade County, Florida state attorney
- Ron Galperin, Los Angeles city controller
- Anne Gannon, Palm Beach County, Florida tax collector
- Ronald C. Green, 15th city controller of Houston
- Kaya Henderson,* chancellor, District of Columbia Public Schools
- Bob Henriquez, Hillsborough County, Florida property appraiser
- Dennis Herrera, San Francisco city attorney
- Scott Israel, sheriff of Broward County, Florida
- Letitia James, New York City public advocate
- Peter Koutoujian, Middlesex County, Massachusetts sheriff
- Jackie Lacey, 42nd Los Angeles district attorney
- Andy Meisner, Oakland County, Michigan treasurer
- Susana Mendoza,* Chicago city clerk
- Arthur Morrell, Orleans Parish, Louisiana criminal clerk of court
- Karl Racine, attorney general of the District of Columbia
- Scott Randolph, Orange County, Florida tax collector
- Celeste Riley, Cumberland County, New Jersey clerk
- Marian T. Ryan, Middlesex County, Massachusetts district attorney
- Larry Stone, Santa Clara County, California assessor
- Paul Strauss, Washington, D.C. shadow senator
- Scott Stringer, 44th New York City comptroller
- Steven W. Tompkins, Suffolk County, Massachusetts sheriff
- Lupe Valdez, Dallas County, Texas sheriff
- Leana Wen,* Baltimore health commissioner
- Karen Yarbrough, Cook County, Illinois, recorder of deeds

Former

- Barbaralee Diamonstein-Spielvogel, New York City director of cultural affairs
- Mark Green, 1st New York City Public Advocate (1994–2001)
- Wendy Greuel, 18th Los Angeles city controller (2009–13)
- Joel Klein, New York City Schools chancellor (2002–11)
- Mike Panetta, Washington, D.C. shadow representative (2007–13)
- Charles H. Ramsey, police commissioner, PPD (2008–16); chief of police, MPD (1998–2007)
- Howard Wolfson,* deputy mayor of New York City for Governmental Affairs (2010–13)

=== Municipal and county legislators ===
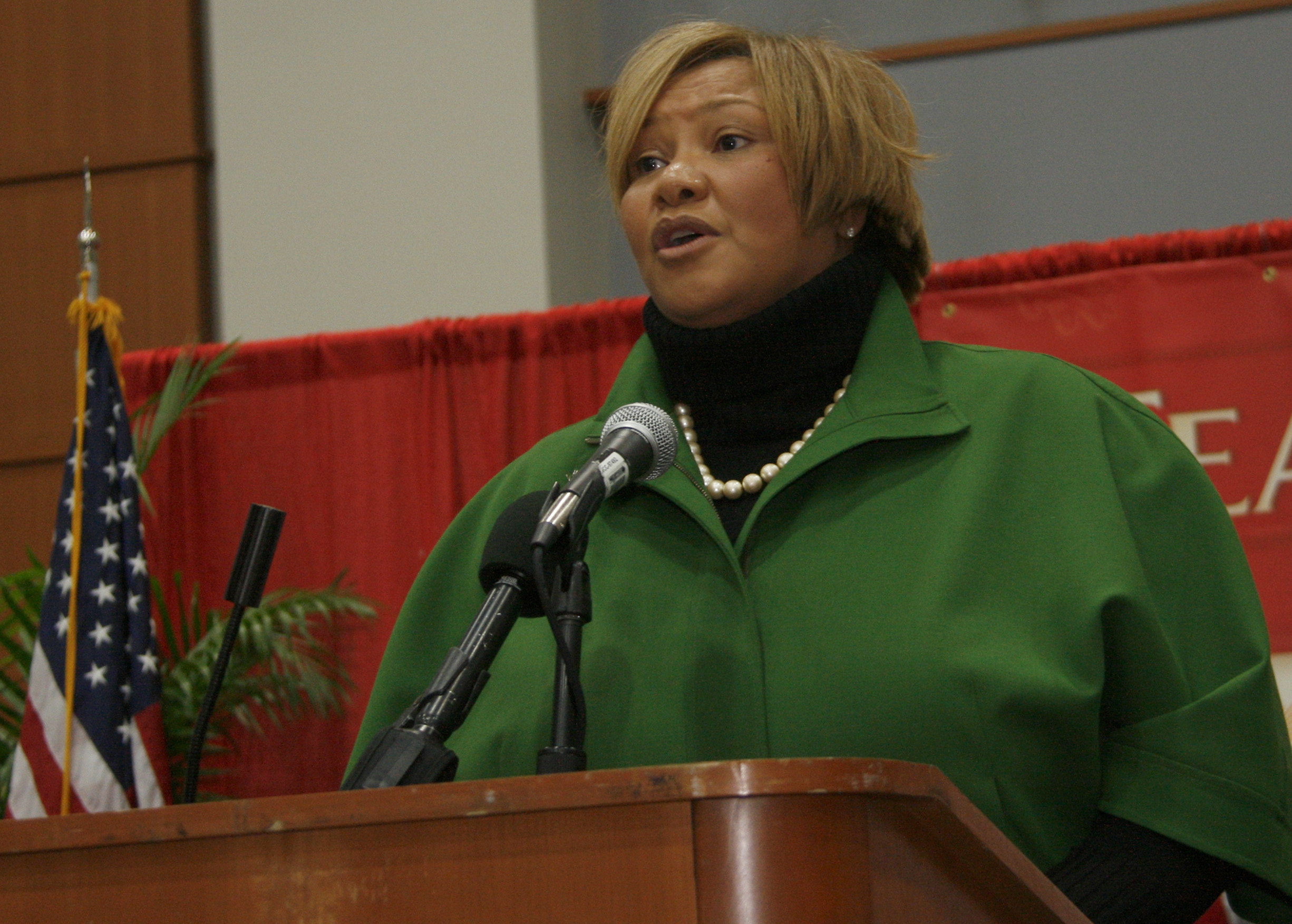
Yvette Alexander

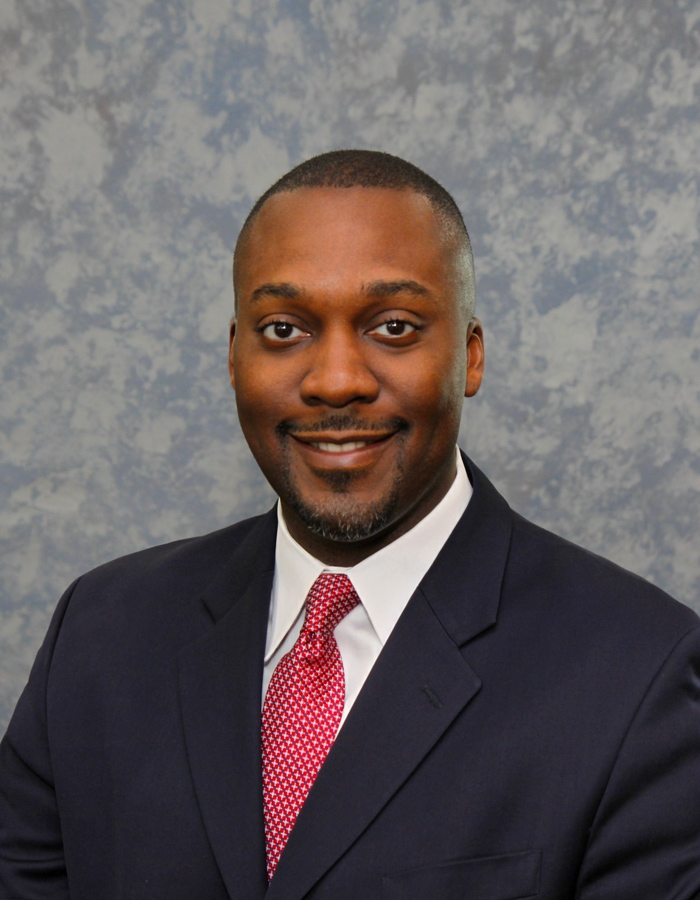
Calvin Ball, III

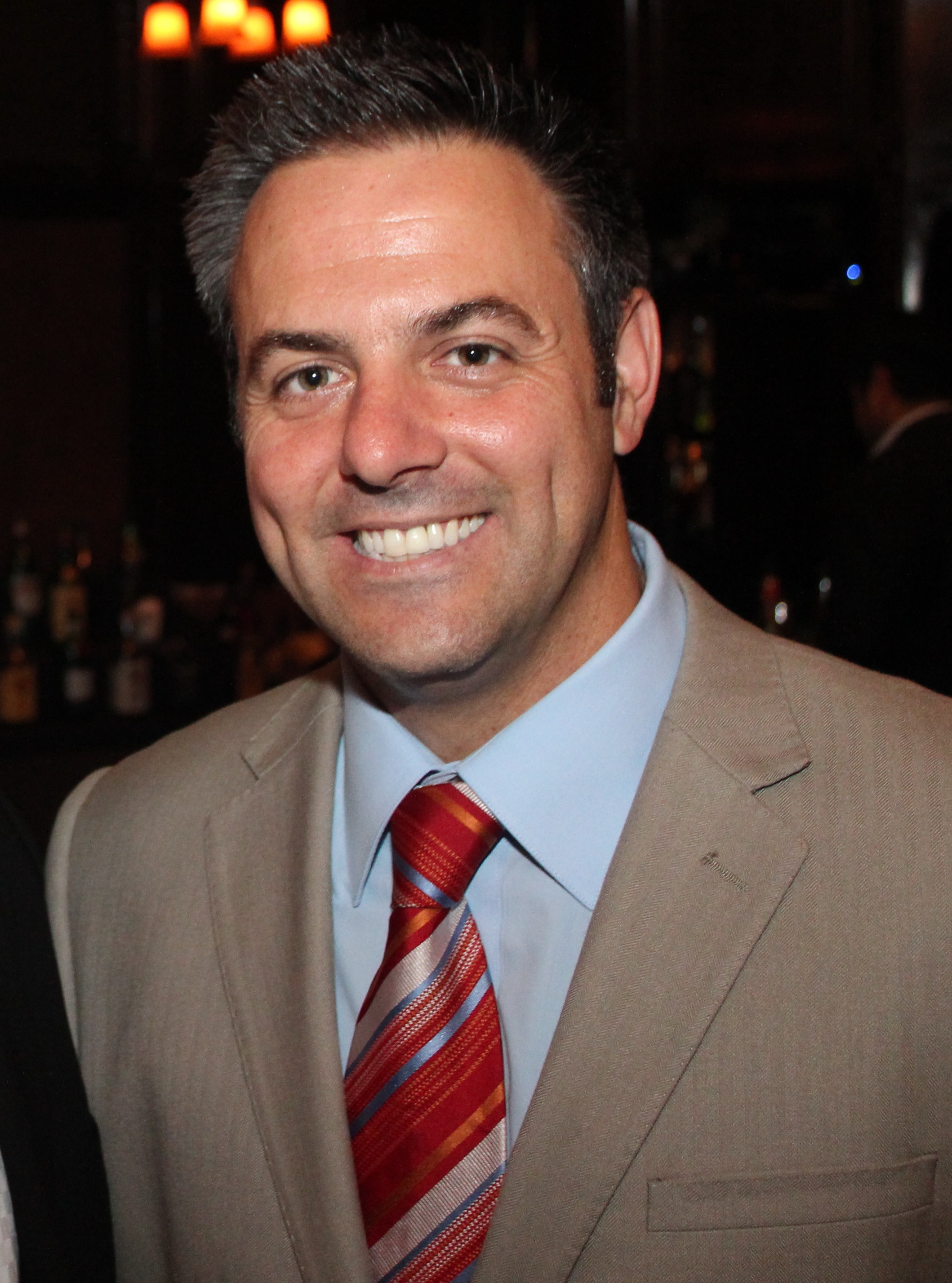
Joe Buscaino

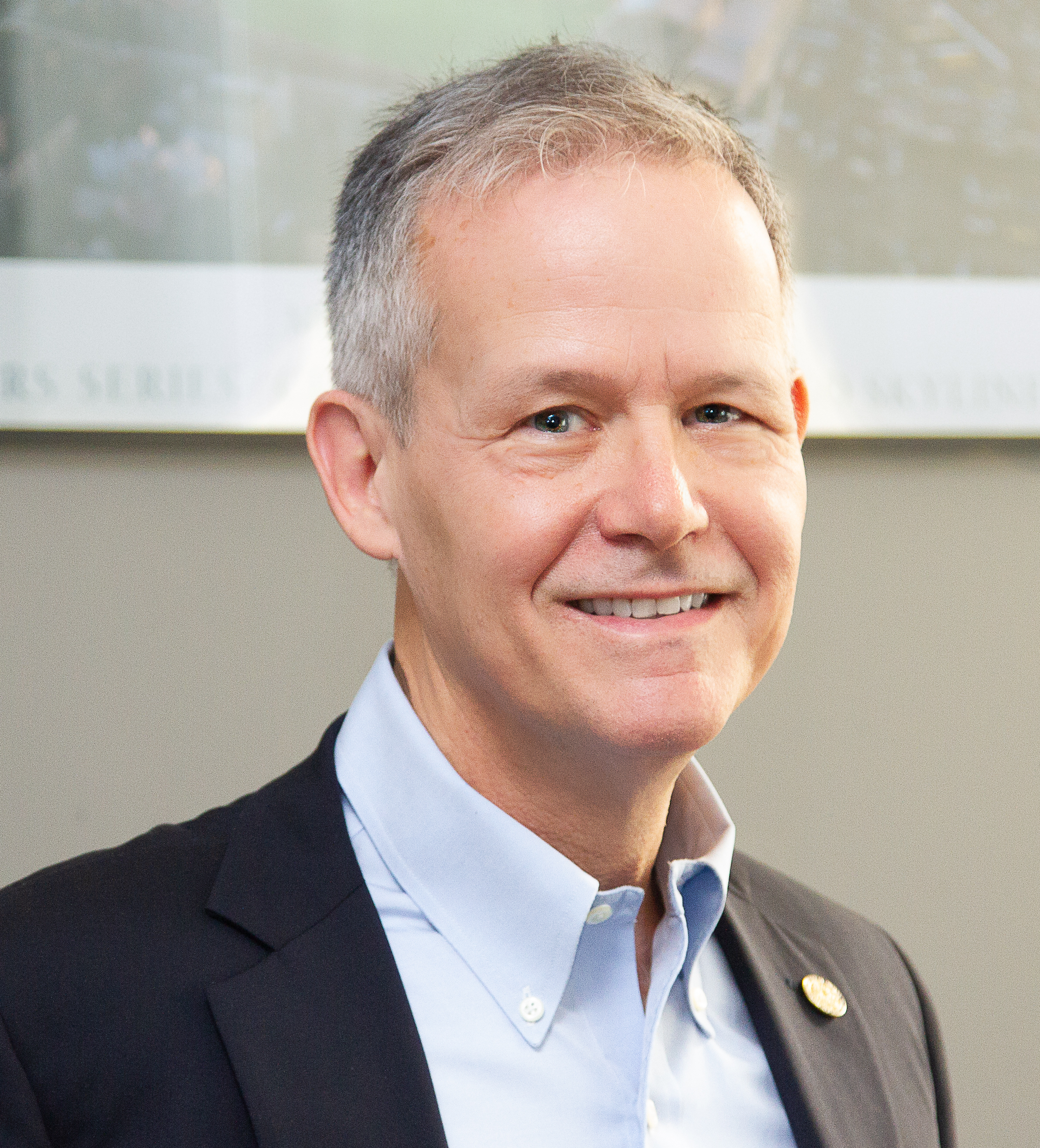
James Cappleman

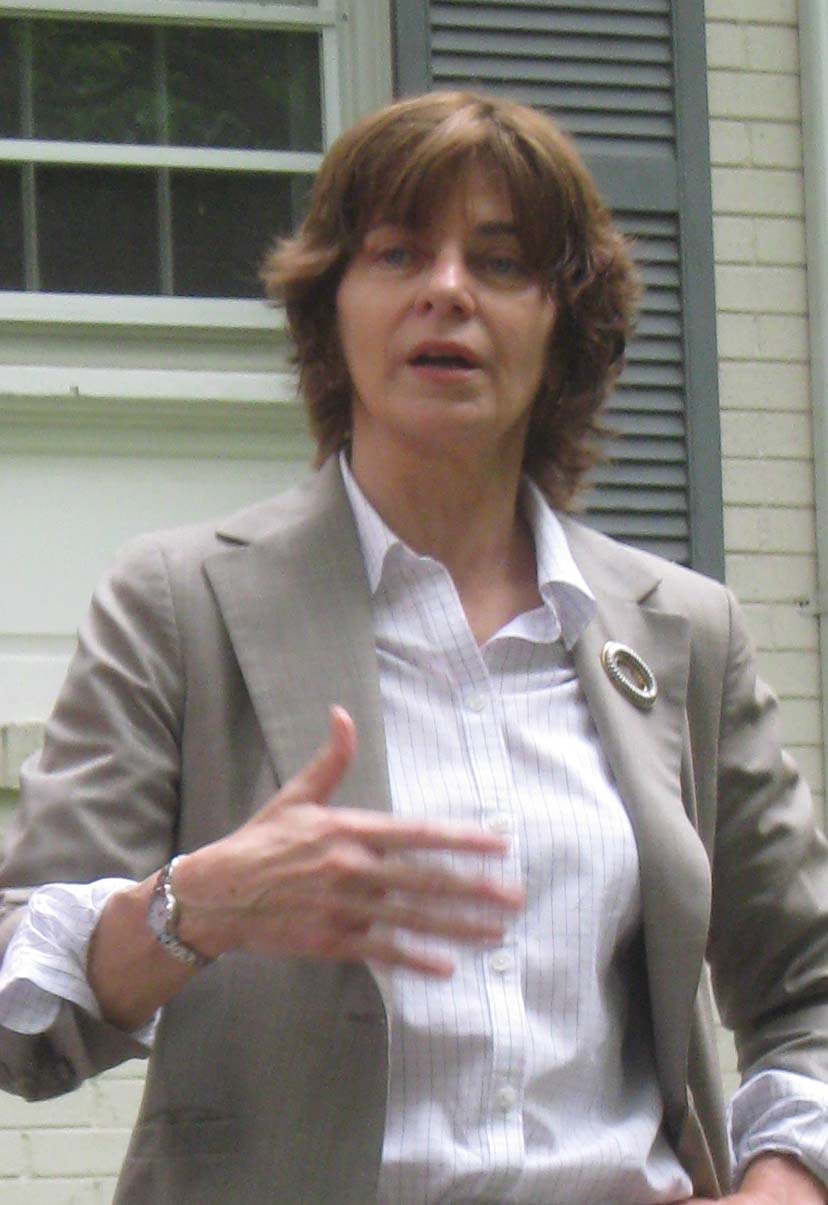
Mary Cheh

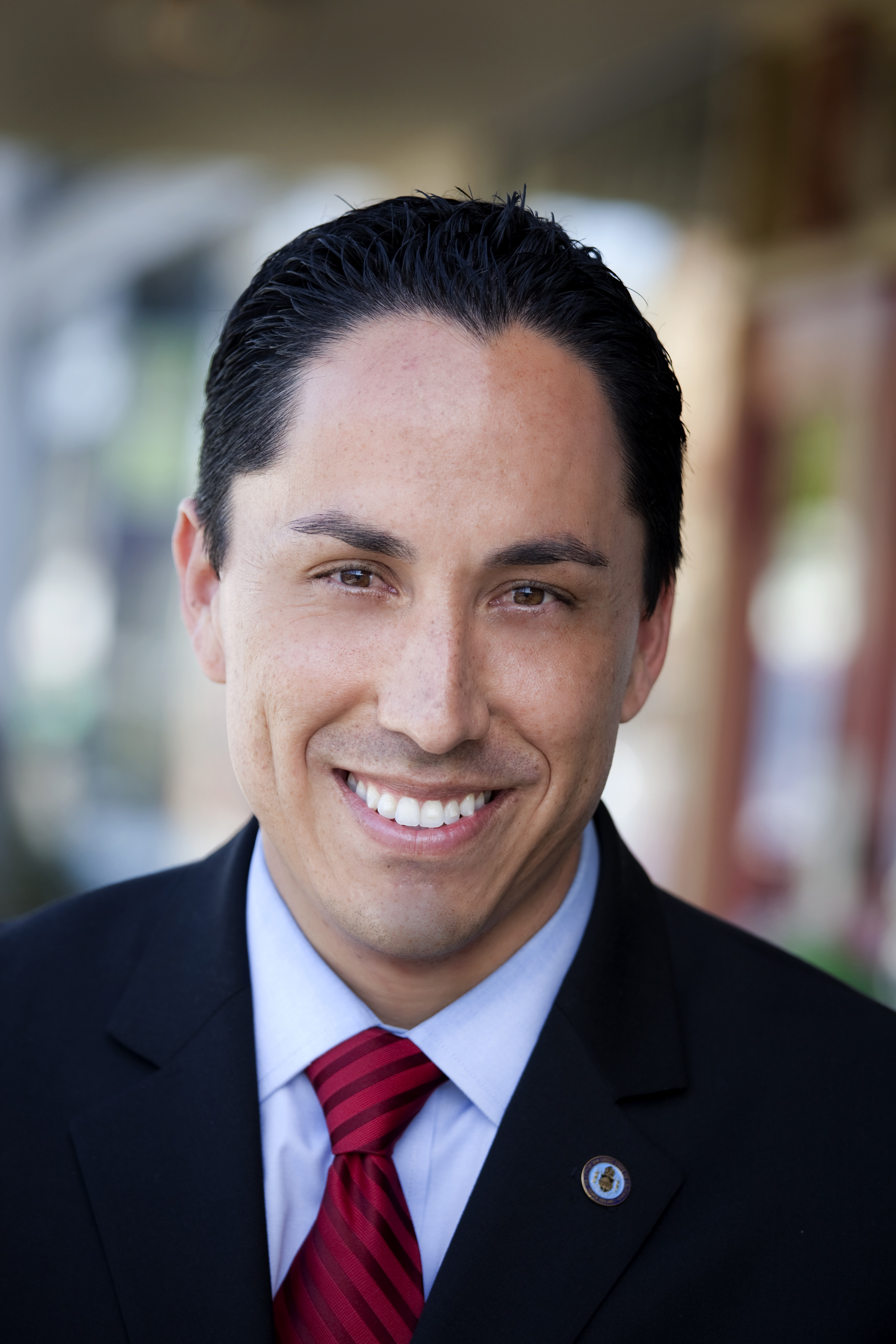
Todd Gloria

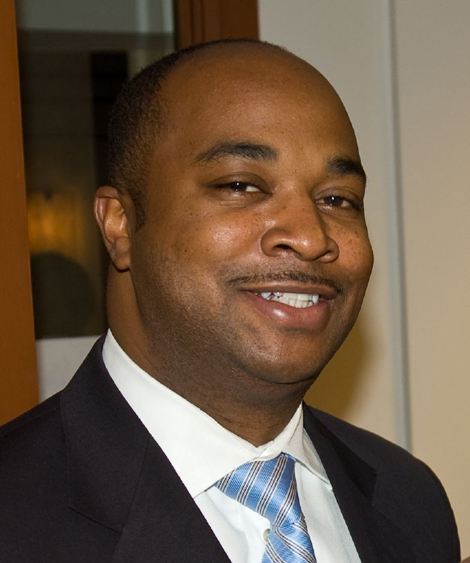
Kwanza Hall

Atlanta

- Kwanza Hall
- Ceasar Mitchell, council president

Boston

- Tito Jackson
- Salvatore LaMattina
- Matt O'Malley
- Ayanna Pressley
- Michelle Wu, council president
- Sam Yoon (2006–10)
- Josh Zakim

Chicago and metro area

- Carrie Austin
- James Cappleman
- Bridget Gainer, Cook County, Illinois
- Deb Mell
- Joe Moore
- Toni Preckwinkle, Cook County, Illinois Board president
- William Singer (1969–75)
- Daniel Solis*

Cincinnati

- David A. Pepper (2001–05)
- Chris Seelbach
- P.G. Sittenfeld*

Cleveland

- Joe Cimperman
- Jeff Johnson
- Matt Zone

Detroit and metro area

- Janeé Ayers
- Raymond E. Basham, Wayne County, Michigan
- Irma Clark-Coleman, Wayne County, Michigan
- Gary Woronchak, Wayne County, Michigan

Los Angeles and metro area

- Joe Buscaino
- José Huizar
- Sheila Kuehl, Los Angeles County
- Nury Martinez
- Gloria Molina, Los Angeles County (1991–2014)
- Mitch O'Farrell
- David Ryu
- Rosalind Wiener Wyman (1954–66)

Midwestern United States

- Bill Avery, Lancaster County, Nebraska
- Mike Boyle, Douglas County, Nebraska
- Antonio French, St. Louis
- Jolie Justus, Kansas City, Missouri
- Linda Langston, Linn County, Iowa
- Michael Stinziano, Columbus, Ohio

Minneapolis and metro area

- Abdi Warsame
- Teresa Daly, Burnsville, Minnesota (2002–06)
- Gary Schiff (2001–14)

Newark, New Jersey and metro area

- Mildred C. Crump, council president
- Luis A. Quintana

New York City and metro area

- Margaret Chin
- Andrew Cohen
- Daniel Dromm
- Julissa Ferreras*
- Lewis A. Fidler (2002–13)
- Daniel Garodnick
- Vincent J. Gentile
- David G. Greenfield
- Barry Grodenchik
- Corey Johnson
- Ben Kallos
- Karen Koslowitz
- Rory Lancman
- Stephen Levin
- Mark D. Levine
- Alan Maisel
- Melissa Mark-Viverito, Council speaker
- Rosie Méndez
- Annabel Palma
- Christine Quinn, Council speaker (2006–13)
- Helen Rosenthal
- Caridad Rodriguez, Hudson County, New Jersey
- Debi Rose
- Mark Treyger
- James Vacca
- Jimmy Van Bramer

Northeastern United States

- Nancy DiNardo,* Trumbull, Connecticut committee chair (former)

Philadelphia and metro area

- Bobby Henon
- Kenyatta Johnson
- Josh Shapiro,* Montgomery County, Pennsylvania
- Stephanie Singer (2011–15)
- Marian B. Tasco (1988–2016)

San Francisco and Bay Area

- Wilma Chan, Alameda County
- Cindy Chavez, Santa Clara County
- Malia Cohen
- Mark Farrell*
- Jane Kim*
- Otto Lee, Sunnyvale, California
- Katy Tang
- Scott Wiener
- Norman Yee*

Seattle and metro area

- Sally J. Clark (2006–15)
- Debora Juarez
- Jeanne Kohl-Welles, King County, Washington
- Joe McDermott, King County, Washington

Southern United States

- Chris Anderson, Chattanooga, Tennessee
- Dan Besse, Winston-Salem, North Carolina
- David Briley, Nashville vice-mayor
- Edith S. Childs, Greenwood, South Carolina
- Ellen Cohen, Houston mayor pro tem.
- Dolores Delahanty, Jefferson County, Kentucky (former)
- Joyce Dickerson, Richland County, South Carolina
- Marty Kiar, Broward County, Florida
- Ann Kitchen, Austin, Texas
- Janet Long, Pinellas County, Florida
- Myron Lowery, Memphis, Tennessee mayor pro tem. (2009)
- Gordon Quan, mayor of Houston pro-tem. (2002–05)
- Barbara Sharief, Broward County, Florida vice-mayor
- Kathy Webb, Little Rock, Arkansas

Washington, D.C. and metro area

- Yvette Alexander
- Charles Allen
- Calvin Ball, III, Howard County, Maryland
- Anita Bonds*
- Mary Cheh
- Arrington Dixon, council chair (1978–82)
- Jack Evans
- Nancy Floreen, Montgomery County, Maryland
- David Grosso* (Independent)
- Sidney A. Katz, Montgomery County, Maryland
- George Leventhal, Montgomery County, Maryland
- LaRuby May
- Kenyan McDuffie
- Phil Mendelson, council chair
- Brianne Nadeau
- Nancy Navarro, Montgomery County, Maryland
- Vincent Orange
- Craig L. Rice, Montgomery County, Maryland council president
- Elissa Silverman* (Independent)
- Brandon Todd

Western United States

- David Bobzien, Reno, Nevada
- Bob Coffin, Las Vegas
- Todd Gloria,* San Diego
- Allegra Haynes,* Denver City Council president (1998–2000)
- Rory Reid, Clark County, Nevada (2003–11)

=== Other municipal and county officials ===
- Steven W. Tompkins, sheriff of Suffolk County, Massachusetts

== Diplomats and bureaucrats ==
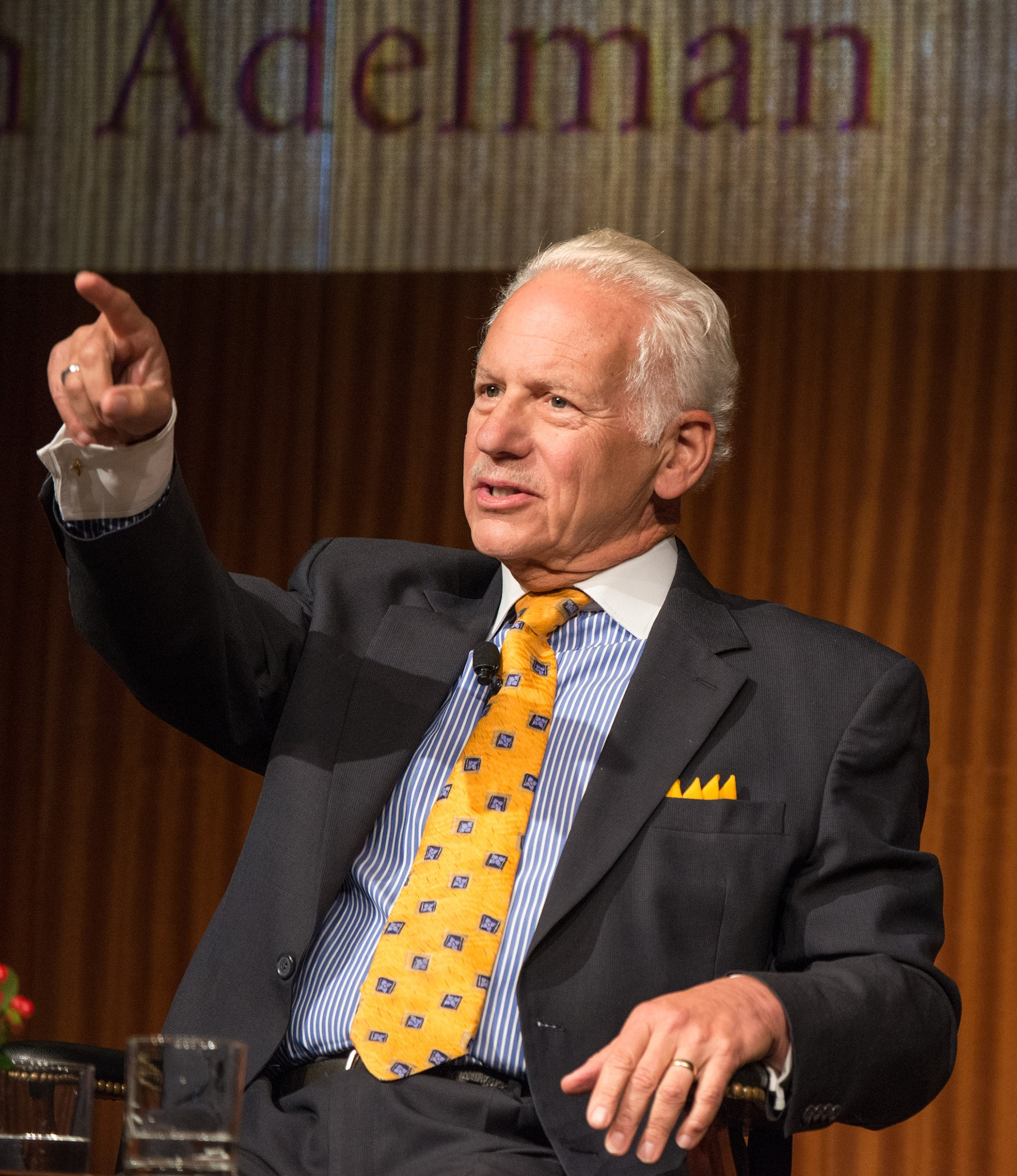
Kenneth Adelman

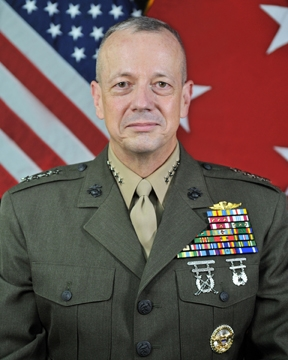
John R. Allen

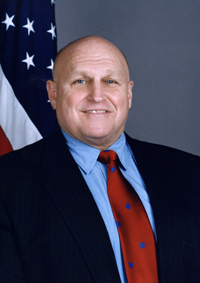
Richard Armitage

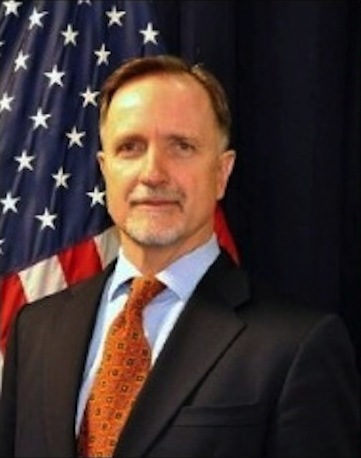
Robert S. Beecroft

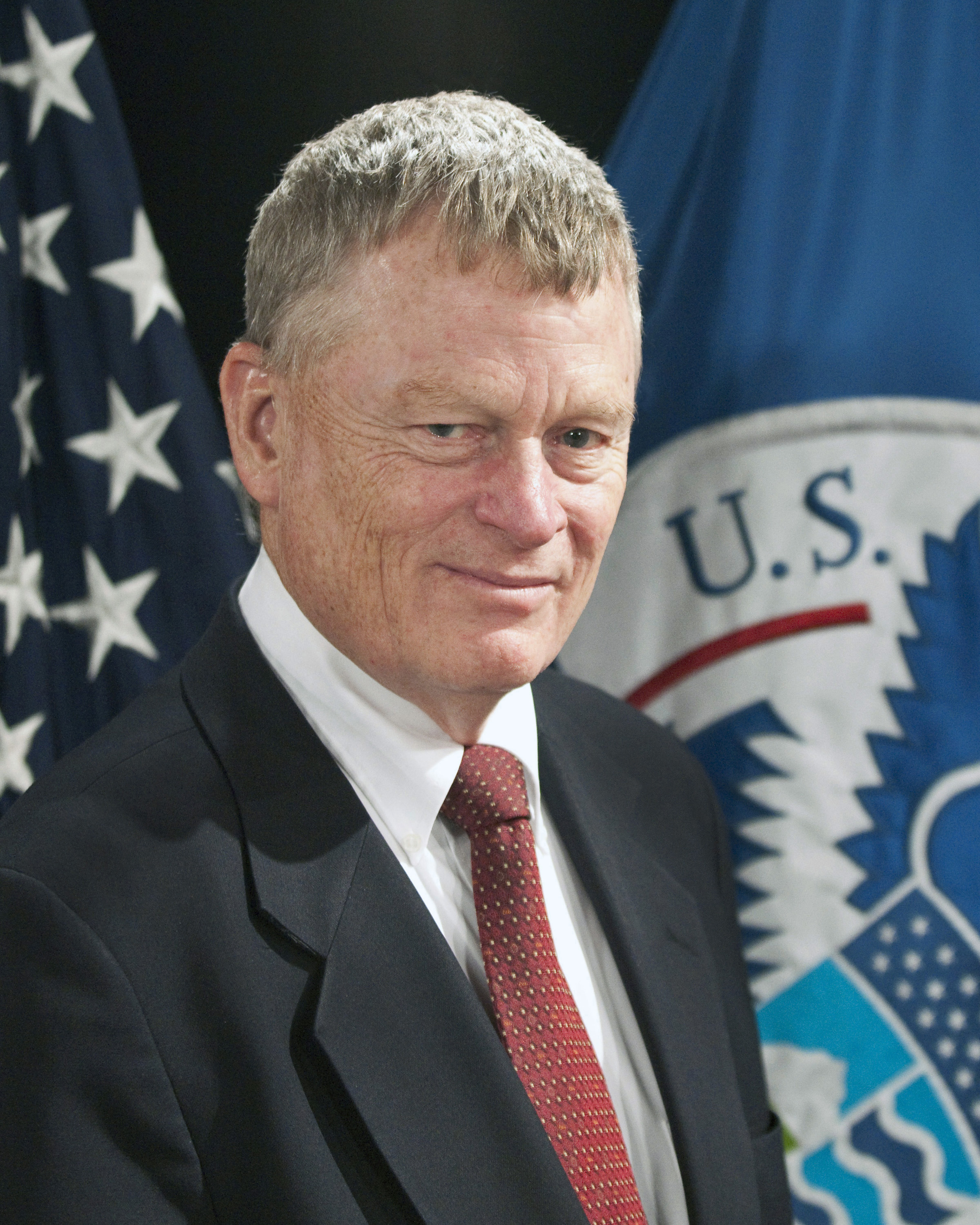
Rand Beers

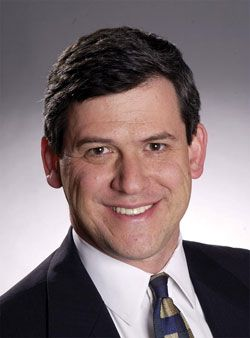
Daniel Benjamin

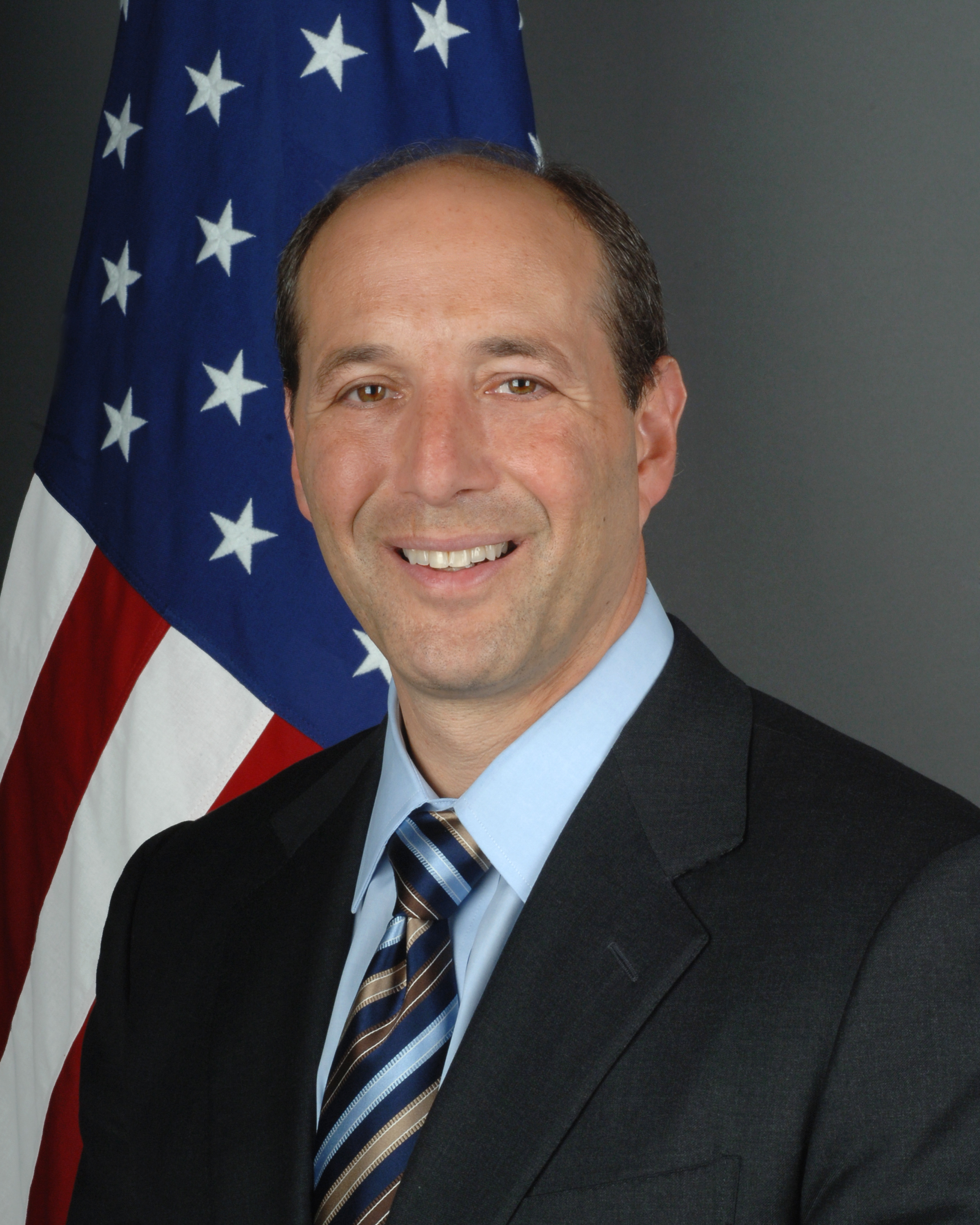
Jeffrey L. Bleich

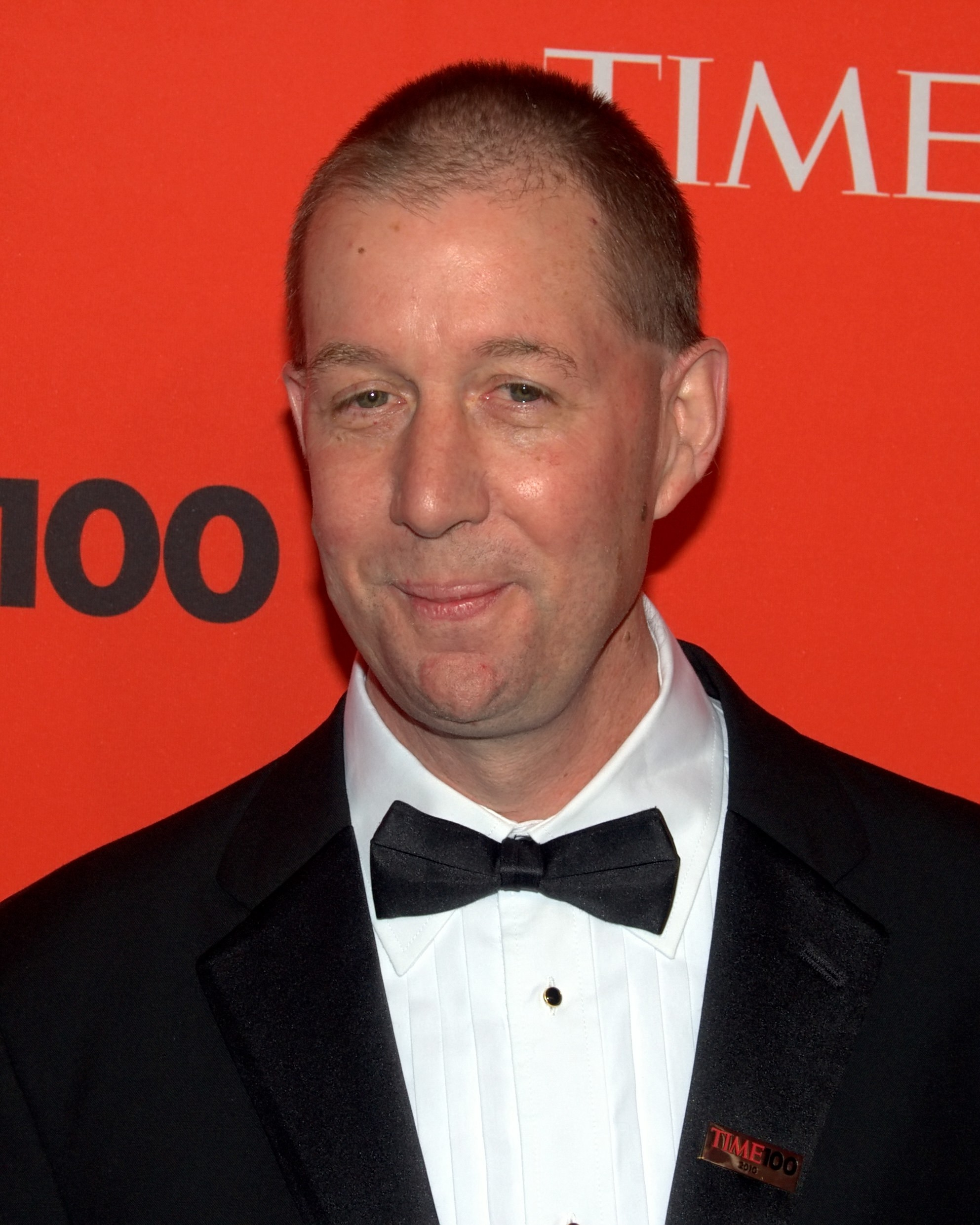
Ron Bloom

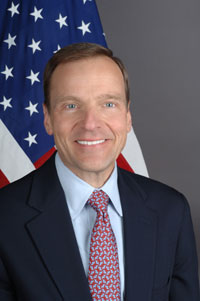
Robert Bradtke

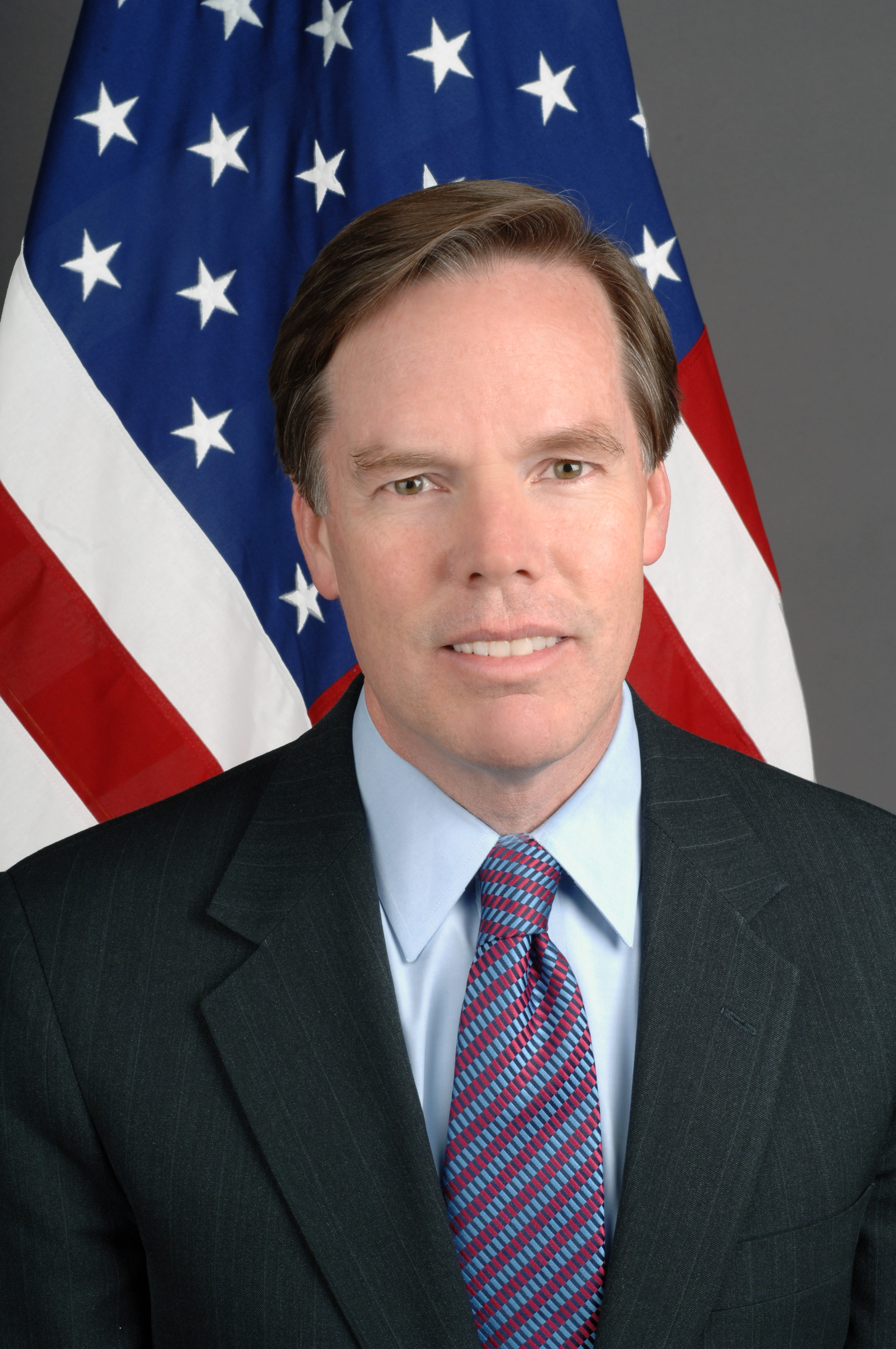
R. Nicholas Burns

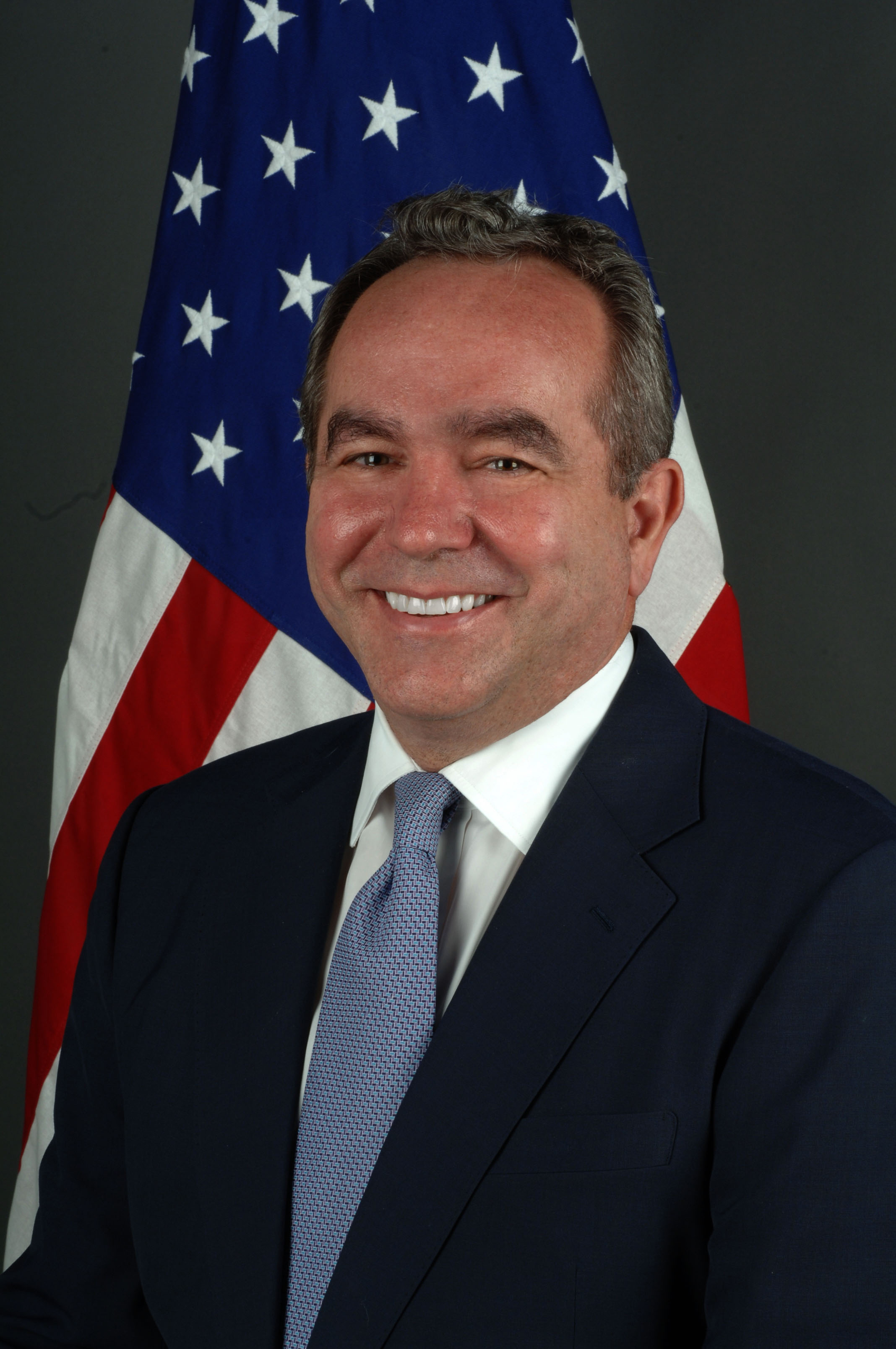
Kurt M. Campbell

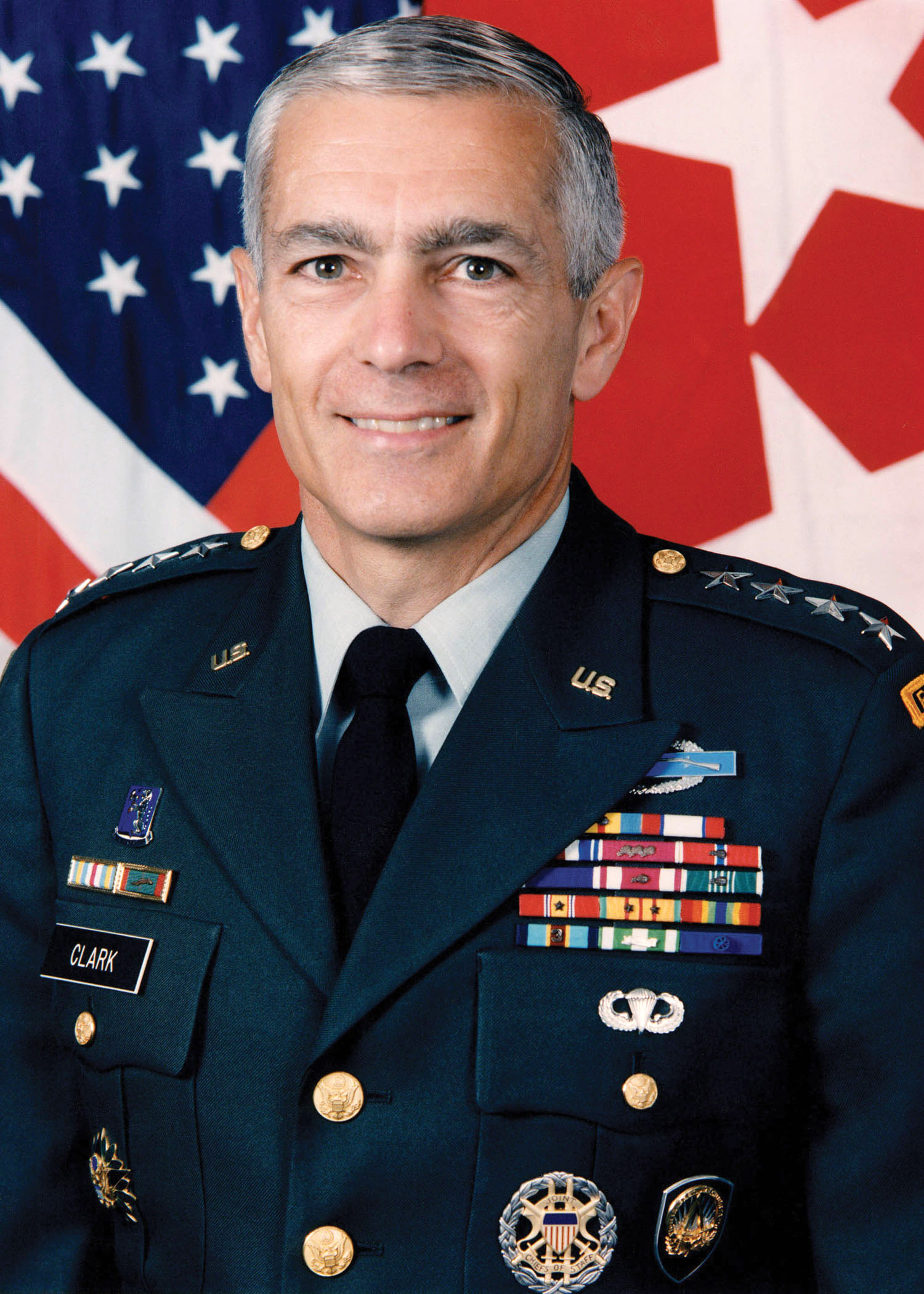
Wesley Clark

=== Federal departmental officials ===
U.S. Department of Commerce

- Cameron Kerry, general counsel (2009–13)
- Ro Khanna, dep. ass. sec. (2009–11)
- Frank Lavin,* under sec. for International Trade (2005–07) (Republican)
- Andrew Manatos, ass. sec. (1977–81)
- Juan Verde, ITA dep. ass. sec. for Europe (2009–11)

U.S. Department of Defense

- Jeremy Bash, chief of staff (2011–13)
- Derek Chollet, ass. sec. for international security affairs (2012–14)
- Michèle Flournoy, under sec. for policy (2009–12)
- George E. Little, ass. to the secretary for public affairs (2011–13)
- James N. Miller, under sec. for policy (2012–14)
- Danny Sebright, former policy director
- Michael G. Vickers, under sec. for intelligence (2011–15)
- Matthew Waxman, dep. ass. sec. for detainee affairs (2004–05) (Republican)
- Paul Wolfowitz, 28th dep. sec. (2001–05) (Republican)

U.S. Department of Education

- Anthony W. Miller, 8th dep. sec. (2009–13)
- Clay Pell, dep. ass. sec. for international and Foreign Language Education (2013)

U.S. Department of Energy

- Kristina M. Johnson, under sec. for energy (2009–10)
- Dan W. Reicher, ass. sec. for energy efficiency and renewable energy (1997–2001)

U.S. Department of Health and Human Services

- Leslie Dach, senior counselor to the sec. (2014–16)
- Howard Koh, 14th ass. sec. for health (2009–14)

U.S. Department of Homeland Security

- Rand Beers, acting sec. (2013)
- Julius W. Becton Jr., director, FEMA (1985–89)

U.S. Department of the Interior

- Esther Kia'aina, ass. sec. for Insular Areas

U.S. Department of Justice

- Webster Hubbell, ass. attorney general (1993–94)

U.S. Department of Labor

- Chris Lu, dep. sec.
- Betsey Stevenson,* chief economist (2010-11)

U.S. Department of State

- Richard Armitage, 13th deputy sec. (2001–05) (Republican)
- Daniel Benjamin, coordinator for counterterrorism (2009–12)
- R. Nicholas Burns, 19th under sec. for political affairs (2005–08) (Republican)
- Kurt M. Campbell, 18th Ass. Sec. for East Asian and Pacific Affairs (2009–13)
- Tamara Cofman Wittes, dep. sec. for Near Eastern Affairs (2009–13)
- Eliot A. Cohen, counselor (2007–09) (Republican)
- James K. Glassman, 5th under sec. for public diplomacy and public affairs (2008–09) (Republican)
- David F. Gordon, 24th director of policy planning (2007–09) (Republican)
- Bob Hormats, under sec. for economic growth, energy, and the environment (2009–13)
- Harold Koh, legal adviser (2009–13)
- Stephen D. Krasner, 23rd director of policy planning (2005–07) (Republican)
- Reta Jo Lewis, former special representative for Global Intergovernmental Affairs
- Capricia Marshall, chief of protocol (2009–13)
- Lissa Muscatine, former senior adviser
- Thomas R. Nides, dep. sec. for management and resources (2011–13)
- Kori Schake, dep. director of policy planning (2007–08) (Republican)
- Eric P. Schwartz, ass. sec. for population, refugees, and migration (2009–11)
- Wendy Sherman, acting dep. sec. (2014–15)
- Anne-Marie Slaughter, 25th director of policy planning (2009–11)
- Jake Sullivan, 26th director of policy planning (2011–13)

U.S. Department of the Treasury

- Fred T. Goldberg Jr., commissioner of Internal Revenue (1989–92) (Republican)
- Rosario Marin, 41st treasurer (2001–03) (Republican)

=== Independent agencies and commissions ===
- Kenneth Adelman, director, ACDA (1983–87) (Republican)
- Alan Blinder, 15th Federal Reserve System vice chair (1994–96)
- Raj Date, dep. director, CFPB (2011–12)
- Lanny Davis, Privacy and Civil Liberties Oversight Board (2005–06)
- Julius Genachowski, 30th FCC chair (2009–13)
- Gary Gensler, 11th CFTC Chair (2009–14)
- Byron Georgiou, Financial Crisis Inquiry Commission
- Alan Gross, USAID contractor
- Fred Hochberg, president, Ex-Im Bank
- Barbara Judge,* SEC commissioner (1980–83)
- Michael Morell, deputy director of the CIA (2010–13)
- John Negroponte,* 1st director of National Intelligence (2005–07) (Republican)
- Maura O'Neill,* chief of innovation, USAID (2009–13)
- Valerie Plame, former CIA officer
- Garrett Reisman,* former NASA astronaut
- Lawrence Romo, director, SSS
- Katrina Swett, 14th and 16th USCIRF chair (2012–13; 2014–15)
- Donna Tanoue, 17th FDIC chair (1998–2001)

=== State, municipal, and tribal staffers ===
- Jill Derby, Nevada regent (1988–2006)
- Leecia Eve, dep. sec., Empire State Development Corporation
- Kalyn Free, special counsel to the principal chief of the Cherokee Nation
- Steven Ma, secretary, California Commission on Asian and Pacific Islander Affairs
- Leslie Anne Miller, former Pennsylvania general counsel
- Chaka Patterson, Illinois ass. attorney general (2003–06)
- Bradley Tusk, Illinois dep. governor (2003–06)
- Maya Wiley, counsel to the mayor of New York City

=== U.S. ambassadors ===
- Morton Abramowitz,* Thailand (1978–81) and Turkey (1989–91)
- Frank Almaguer,* Honduras (1999–2002)
- Diego Asencio,* Colombia (1977–80) and Brazil (1983–86)
- Christopher C. Ashby, Uruguay (1997–2001)
- Robert Beecroft,* Bosnia and Herzegovina (2001–04)
- Robert O. Blake,* Sri Lanka and the Maldives (2006–09) and Indonesia
- Robert Blackwill, India (2001–03) (Republican)
- Jeffrey L. Bleich,* Australia (2009–13)
- Aurelia E. Brazeal,* Federated States of Micronesia (1990–93), Kenya (1993–96), and Ethiopia (2002–05)
- Tim Broas, Netherlands (2014–16)
- Peter Burleigh,* Sri Lanka and the Maldives (1995–97)
- R. Nicholas Burns,* Greece (1997–2001)
- Johnnie Carson,* Uganda (1991–94), Zimbabwe (1995–97), and Kenya (1999–2003)
- Carey Cavanaugh,* Nagorno-Karabakh and New Independent States Regional Conflicts (2000–01)
- Paul L. Cejas,* Belgium (1998–2001)
- Wendy Chamberlin,* Laos (1996–99) and Pakistan (2001–02)
- Marion V. Creekmore Jr.,* Sri Lanka and the Maldives (1989–92)
- Ryan Crocker,* Lebanon (1990–93), Kuwait (1994–97), Syria (1998–2001), Pakistan (2004–07), Iraq (2007–09), and Afghanistan (2011–12)
- James B. Cunningham,* Israel (2008–11) and Afghanistan (2012–14)
- Jeffrey Davidow,* Zambia (1988–90), Venezuela (1993–96), and Mexico (1998–2002)
- John R. Dinger,* Mongolia (2000–03)
- Eileen Donahoe, UN Human Rights Council (2010–13)
- William Eacho,* Austria (2009–13)
- Stuart E. Eizenstat,* European Union (1993–96)
- Nancy Ely-Raphel,* Slovenia (1998–2001)
- Mark Wylea Erwin, Mauritius, Seychelles, and the Comoros (1999–2001)
- Elizabeth Frawley Bagley, Portugal (1994–97)
- Robert S. Gelbard,* Bolivia (1988–1991) and Indonesia (1999–2001)
- Gordon Giffin, Canada (1997–2001)
- Edward Gnehm,* Jordan (2001–04), Australia (2000–01), and Kuwait (1991–94)
- Donald Gregg,* South Korea (1989–93)
- David A. Gross, International Communications and Information Policy (2001–09) (Republican)
- Marc Grossman,* Turkey (1995–97)
- Gabriel Guerra-Mondragón,* Chile (1994–98)
- Maura Harty,* Paraguay (1997–99) and assistant secretary of state for consular affairs (2002–08)
- James Hormel, Luxembourg (1999–2001)
- Thomas C. Hubbard,* the Philippines (1996–2000) and South Korea (2001–04)
- David Huebner, New Zealand (2009–14)
- Edmund J. Hull,* Yemen (2001–04)
- Cameron R. Hume,* Algeria (1997–2000), South Africa (2001–04), Sudan (2005–07), and Indonesia (2007–10)
- Dennis Jett,* Mozambique (1993–96) and Peru (1996–99)
- A. Elizabeth Jones,* Kazakhstan (1995–97)
- Samuel L. Kaplan, Morocco (2009–13)
- Thomas C. Krajeski,* Yemen (2004–07) and Bahrain (2011–14)
- Daniel C. Kurtzer,* Egypt (1998–2001) and Israel (2001–05)
- Alphonse F. La Porta,* Mongolia (1997–2000)
- John Maisto,* Organization of American States (2003–06), Venezuela (1997–2000), and Nicaragua (1993–96)
- Robert A. Mandell,* Luxembourg (2011–15)
- Marshall Fletcher McCallie,* Namibia (1993–96)
- Jackson McDonald,* the Gambia (2001–04) and Guinea (2004–07)
- Thomas J. Miller,* Bosnia and Herzegovina (1999–2001) and Greece (2001–04)
- William Green Miller,* Ukraine (1993–98)
- Mark Minton,* Mongolia (2006–09)
- Philip D. Murphy, Germany (2009–13)
- Skipp Orr, Asian Development Bank
- B. Lynn Pascoe,* Malaysia (1998–2001) and Indonesia (2004–07)
- Carlos Pascual, Ukraine (2000–03) and Mexico (2009–11)
- Nicholas Platt,* Zambia (1982–85), Philippines (1987–91), and Pakistan (1991–92)
- Nancy Powell,* Uganda (1997–99), Ghana (2001–02), Pakistan (2002–04), Nepal (2007–10) and India (2012–14)
- Phyllis M. Powers,* Panama (2010–12) and Nicaragua (2012–15)
- Stephen Rapp,* War Crimes Issues
- Charles A. Ray,* Cambodia (2003–05) and Zimbabwe (2009–12)
- Thomas Bolling Robertson,* Slovenia (2004–08)
- Edward L. Romero, Spain (1998–2001)
- Dan Rooney, Ireland (2009–12)
- Arthur Louis Schechter, Bahamas (1998–2001)
- Cynthia P. Schneider, Netherlands (1998–2001)
- Elaine Schuster, Public Delegate to the UN General Assembly (2009–10)
- Derek Shearer,* Finland (1994-7)
- M. Osman Siddique, Fiji, Nauru, Tonga, and Tuvalu (1999–2001)
- Thomas W. Simons Jr.,* Poland (1990–93) and Pakistan (1996–98)
- James B. Smith, Saudi Arabia (2009–13)
- Carl Spielvogel, Slovakia (2000–01)
- Kathleen Stephens,* South Korea (2008–11)
- Shirin R. Tahir-Kheli, Democracy, Human Rights, and International Operations (2003–05) (Republican)
- Peter Teeley, Canada (1992–93) (Republican)
- Joe Torsella, Representative to the United Nations for Management and Reform (2011–14)
- Eleni Tsakopoulos Kounalakis, Hungary (2010–13)
- Robert H. Tuttle,* United Kingdom (2005–09) (Republican)
- Nicholas Veliotes,* Jordan (1978–81) and Egypt (1984–86)
- Melanne Verveer, Global Women's Issues (2009–13)
- Edward S. Walker Jr.,* United Arab Emirates (1989–92), Egypt (1994–97), and Israel (1997–99)
- Alexander F. Watson,* Peru (1986–89)
- Barry B. White, Norway (2009–13)
- Joseph C. Wilson, Gabon (1992–95)
- Johnny Young,* Sierra Leone (1989–92), Togo (1994–97), Bahrain (1997–2001), and Slovenia (2001–04)
- Stephen M. Young,* Kyrgyzstan (2003–05)

=== U.S. attorneys ===
- Roxanne Conlin, S.D. Iowa (1977–81)
- Brendan Johnson, D.S.D (2009–15)
- Doug Jones, N.D. Alabama (1997–2001)
- John McKay,* W.D. Wash. (2001–06) (Republican)
- Tim Purdon, D.N.D. (2010–15)
- Dan K. Webb,* N.D. Ill. (1981–85) (Republican)

=== U.S. military ===
Air Force

- Michael Donley, 22nd secretary (2008–13) (Republican)
- John W. Douglass, ret. 1-star general
- Irv Halter, ret. 2-star general
- Marcelite J. Harris, ret. 2-star general
- Lloyd W. Newton,* ret. 4-star general
- Daniel P. Woodward, ret. 1-star general
- Margaret H. Woodward, ret. 2-star general

Army

- Clara Adams-Enders, ret. 1-star general
- Edward D. Baca, ret. 3-star general
- Joe N. Ballard, ret. 3-star general, chief of engineers (1996–2000)
- Daniel W. Christman, ret. 3-star general, West Point superintendent (1996–2001)
- Wesley Clark, ret. 4-star general
- Paul Eaton, ret. 2-star general
- Mari K. Eder, ret. 2-star general
- Robert G. Gard Jr., ret. 3-star general
- Florent Groberg, ret. captain (Republican)
- Claudia J. Kennedy, ret. 3-star general
- Keith Kerr, ret. 1-star general
- David M. Maddox,* ret. 4-star general
- Peter Mansoor, ret. colonel (Republican)
- Robert L. Nabors, ret. 2-star general
- Dana J.H. Pittard, ret. 2-star general
- Gale Pollock,* ret. 2-star general (Republican)
- Robert W. Sennewald,* ret. 4-star general
- Loree K. Sutton, ret. 1-star general
- Antonio Taguba, ret. 2-star general
- Abraham J. Turner, ret. 2-star general
- Robin Umberg, ret. 1-star general
- Johnnie E. Wilson, ret. 4-star general
- Jill Wine-Banks, general counsel (1977–80)

Coast Guard

- Sally Brice-O'Hara, ret. 3-star admiral, 27th vice-commandant (2010–12)

Marine Corps

- John R. Allen, ret. 4-star general
- Juan G. Ayala, ret. 2-star general
- David M. Brahms, ret. 1-star general
- Stephen A. Cheney, ret. 1-star general
- Walter E. Gaskin, ret. 3-star general
- Arnold L. Punaro, ret. 2-star general

Navy

- Donald Arthur, ret. 3-star admiral, 35th surgeon general (2004–07)
- Bruce E. Grooms, ret. 3-star admiral
- Gail Harris, ret. captain
- John Hutson, ret. 2-star admiral
- Mark Kelly, ret. captain and NASA astronaut
- Jay A. DeLoach, ret. 1-star admiral
- Deborah Loewer, ret. 1-star admiral
- Alberto J. Mora,* general counsel (2001–06) (Republican)
- John B. Nathman,* ret. 4-star admiral

=== White House staff ===
- Jeremy Bernard, social secretary (2011–15)
- Jarrod Bernstein, assoc. director, Office of Public Engagement (2011–13)
- Ron Bloom, assistant for manufacturing policy (2009–11)
- Phillip D. Brady, staff secretary (1991–93) (Republican)
- Mary Beth Cahill, director, Office of Public Liaison (1999–01)
- James W. Cicconi, staff sec. (1989–1990) (Republican)
- Maria Echaveste, dep. chief of staff for policy (1998–01)
- Scott Evertz, director, Office of National AIDS Policy (2001–03) (Republican)
- Jon Favreau, director of speechwriting (2009–13)
- Tony Fratto, dep. press sec. (2006–09) (Republican)
- Glen Fukushima, dep. ass. trade representative (1988–90)
- Rachel Goslins, executive director, President's Committee on the Arts and Humanities
- Harold M. Ickes, dep. chief of staff for Policy (1993–97)
- Janis F. Kearney, presidential diarist (1995–2001)
- Ron Klain,* Ebola response coordinator (2014–15)
- Ann Lewis, communications director (1997–2000)
- Reggie Love,* personal aide to the president (2009–11)
- James M. Lyons, counsel, Office of the President-Elect (1992–93)
- Alyssa Mastromonaco, dep. chief of staff for operations (2011–14)
- Regina Montoya, director, Office of Intergovernmental Affairs (1993)
- Minyon Moore, director, Office of Public Liaison (1998–99)
- Jackie Norris, former chief of staff to Michelle Obama
- Kal Penn, assoc. director, Office of Public Engagement and Intergovernmental Affairs (2009–11)
- David Plouffe, senior advisor to the president (2011–13)
- Desirée Rogers, social secretary (2009–10)
- Brent Scowcroft, 9th and 17th National Security advisor (1975–77; 1989–93) (Republican)
- Julianna Smoot, social secretary (2010–11)
- Gene Sperling, director, National Economic Council (1996–2001; 2011–14)
- Kimberly Teehee, senior policy advisor for Native American Affairs (2009–12)
- Buffy Wicks, dep. director, Office of Public Engagement (2009–10)
- Lezlee Westine, director, Office of Public Liaison (2001–05) (Republican)

== International political figures ==
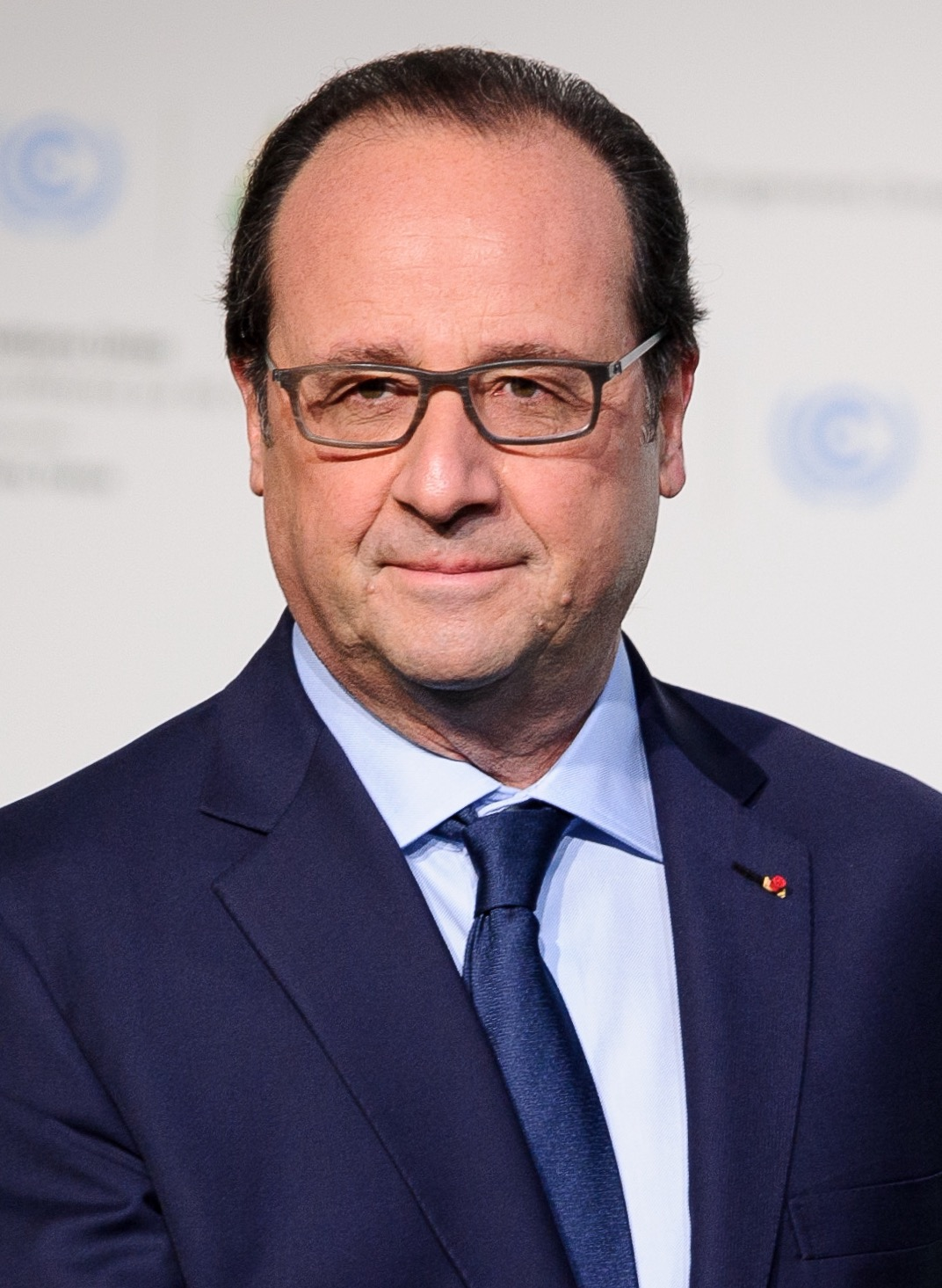
François Hollande

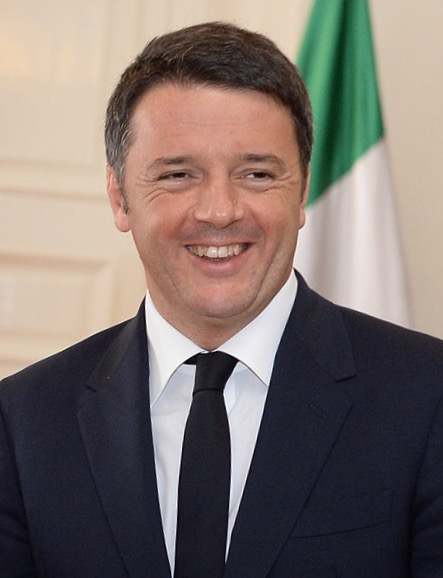
Matteo Renzi

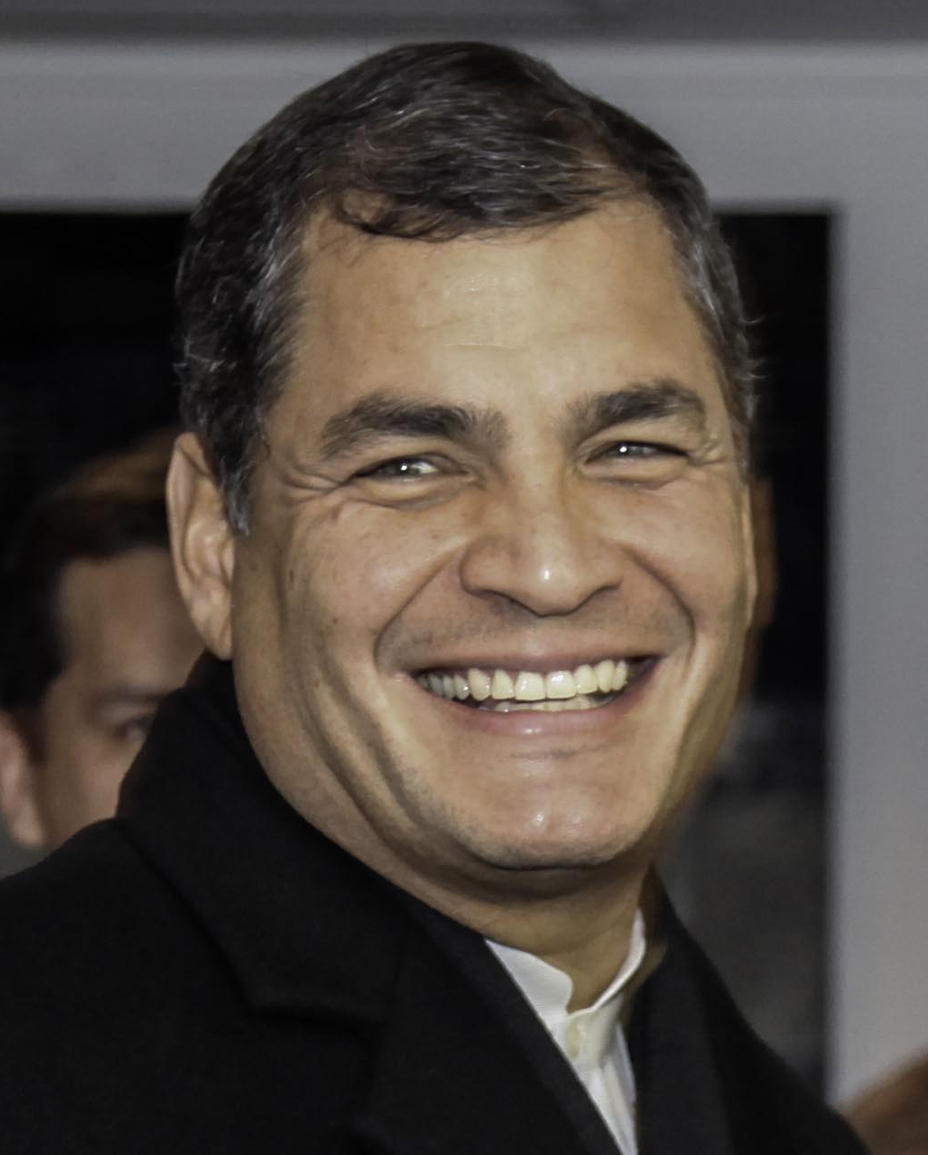
Rafael Correa

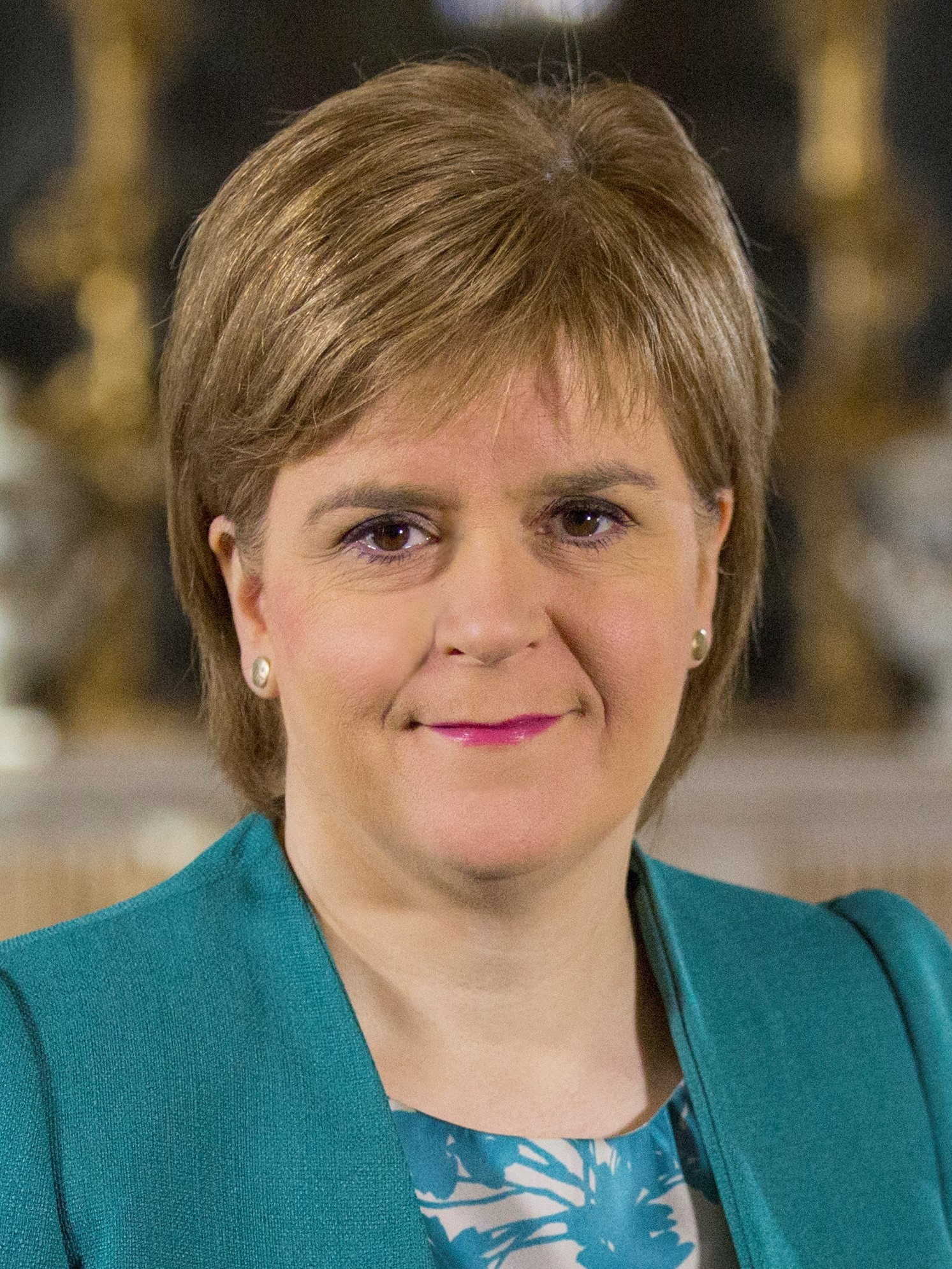
Nicola Sturgeon

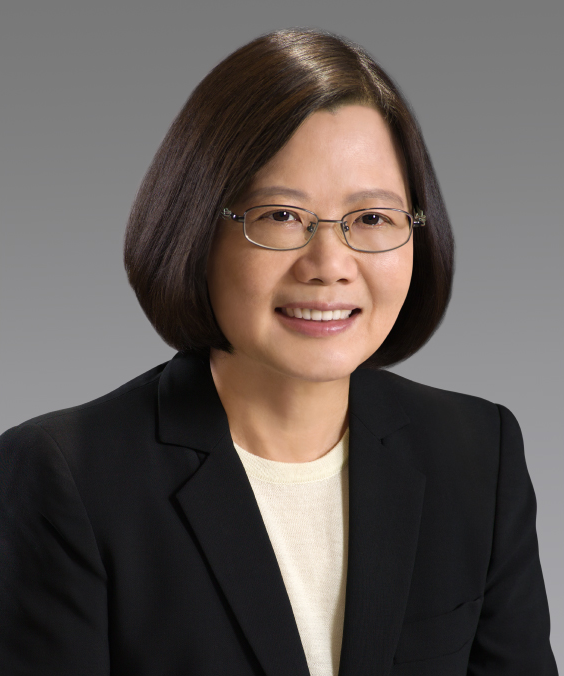
Tsai Ing-wen

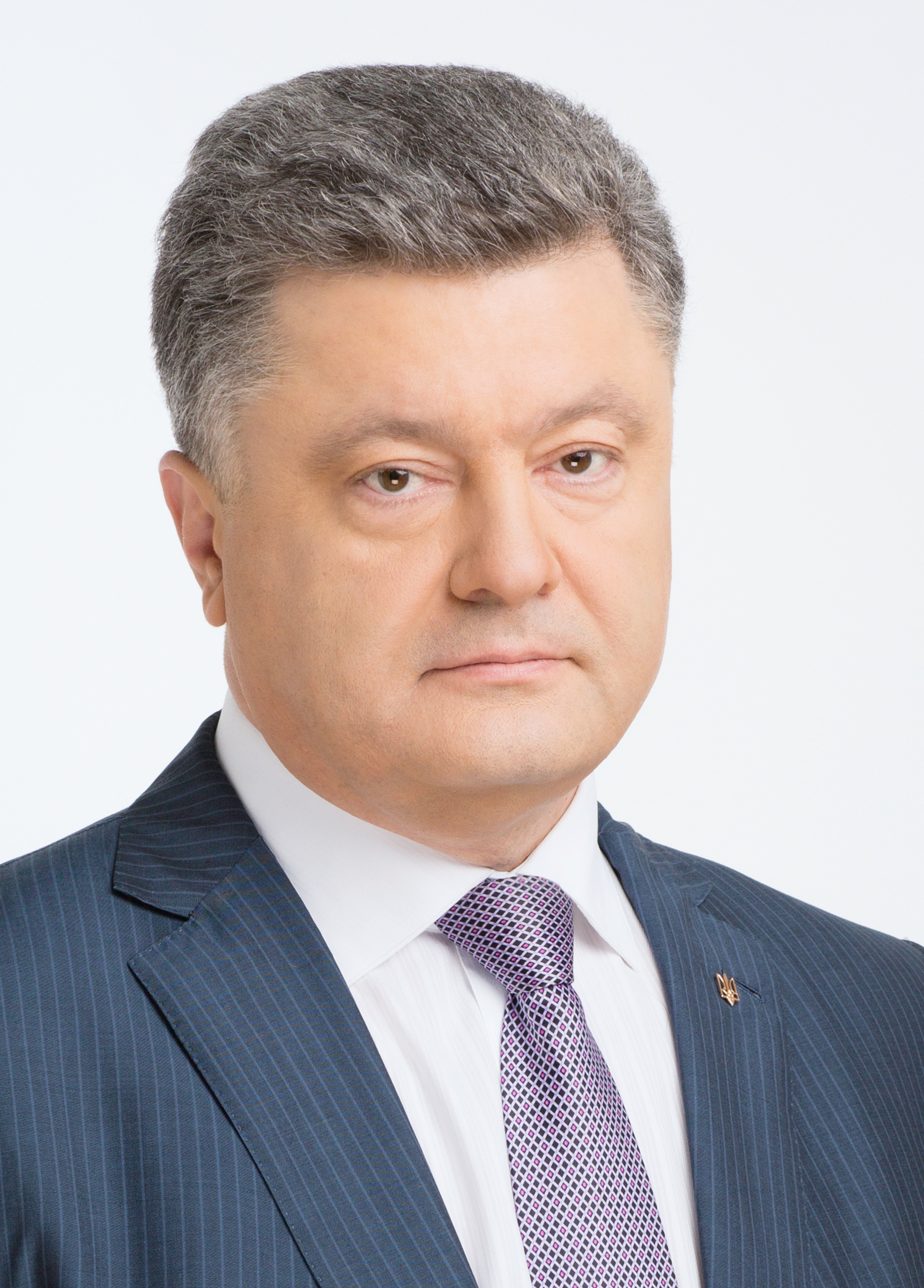
Petro Poroshenko

=== Heads of state and government ===
==== Current ====
- Michelle Bachelet, 33rd and 35th president of Chile (2006–2010, 2014–2018) (Socialist Party)
- Rafael Correa,* 43rd president of Ecuador (2007–2017) (PAIS Alliance)
- François Hollande,* 24th president of France (2012–2017) (Socialist Party)
- John Key, 38th prime minister of New Zealand (2008–2016) (National Party)
- Stefan Löfven,* 33rd prime minister of Sweden (2014–2021) (Social Democrats)
- Petro Poroshenko, 5th president of Ukraine (2014–2019) (Solidarity)
- Matteo Renzi, 56th prime minister of Italy (2014–2016) (Democratic Party)
- Bohuslav Sobotka, 11th prime minister of the Czech Republic (2014–2017) (Social Democratic Party)
- Nicola Sturgeon, 5th first minister of Scotland (2014–2023) (Scottish National Party)
- Tsai Ing-wen, 7th president of the Republic of China (2016–2024) (Democratic Progressive Party)
- Manuel Valls, 169th prime minister of France (2014–2016) (Socialist Party)
- Aleksandar Vučić, 11th prime minister of Serbia (2014–2017) (Serbian Progressive Party)

==== Former ====
- Carl Bildt, prime minister of Sweden (1991–1994) (Moderate Party)
- Tony Blair, 51st prime minister of the United Kingdom (1997–2007) (Labour Party)
- Kim Campbell, 19th prime minister of Canada (1993) (Progressive Conservative)
- Laurent Fabius, 158th prime minister of France (1984–1986) (Socialist Party)
- Vicente Fox, 55th president of Mexico (2000–2006) (National Action Party)
- Julia Gillard, 27th prime minister of Australia (2010–2013) (Labor Party)
- Atifete Jahjaga,* 4th president of Kosovo (2011–2016) (Independent)
- Paul Keating,* 24th prime minister of Australia (1991–1996) (Labor Party)
- Jiří Paroubek, 6th prime minister of the Czech Republic (2005–2006) (Czech Social Democratic Party)
- Nicolas Sarkozy, 23rd president of France (2007–2012) (The Republicans)

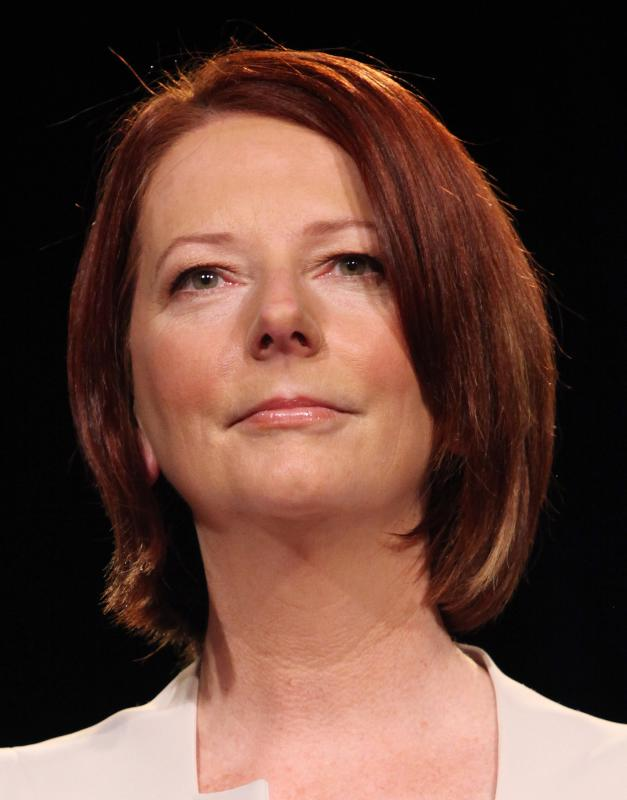
Julia Gillard

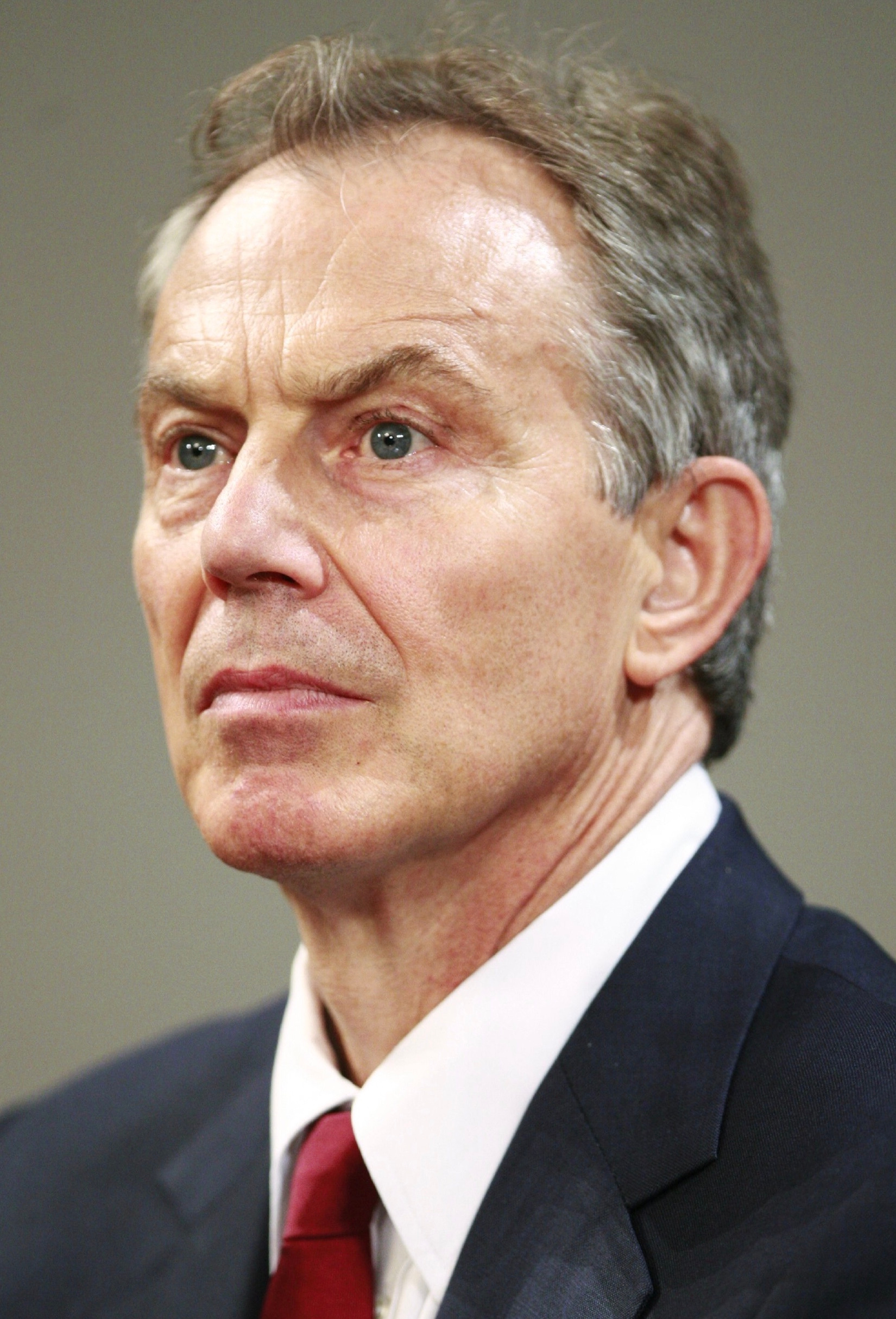
Tony Blair

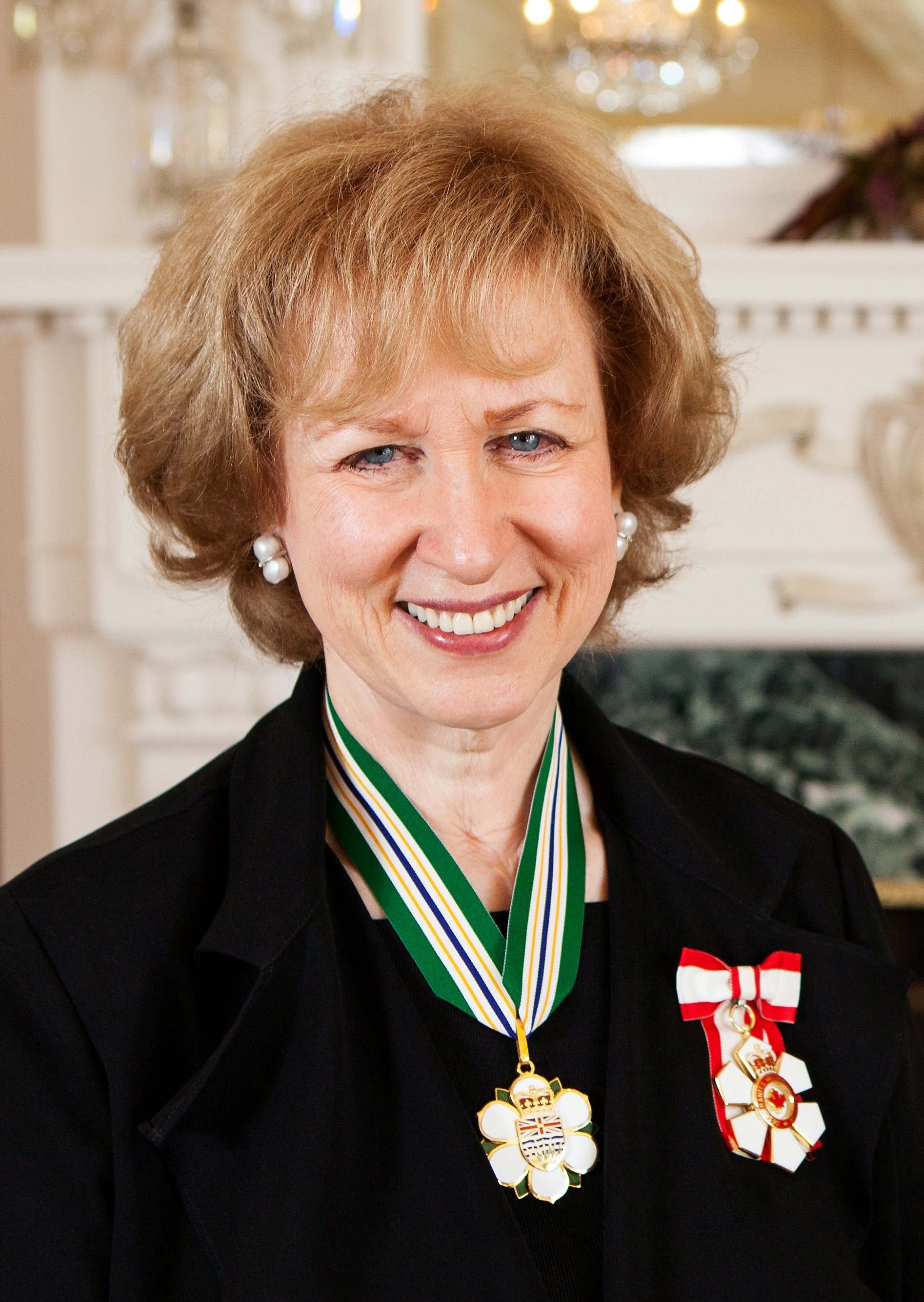
Kim Campbell

=== Members of national and supranational parliaments ===
Australia

Liberal Party

- Julie Bishop, 38th foreign minister
- Christopher Pyne, leader of the House (2013–2019), and minister for defence industry (2016–2018)

Labor Party

- David Feeney
- Helen Polley
- Bill Shorten, 27th employment minister (2011–13) (Opposition Leader)
- Wayne Swan, 14th deputy prime minister (2010–13)
- Tim Watts*

Bolivia

Social Democratic Movement

- Jeanine Añez

Cambodia

National Rescue Party

- Sam Rainsy,* finance minister (1993–94) (party leader)

Canada

Conservative Party

- John Baird, 10th foreign minister (2010–15)

Liberal Party

- Alexandra Mendès*

Czech Republic

ANO 2011

- Richard Brabec, minister of the environment
- Pavel Telička, MEP

Communist Party of Bohemia and Moravia

- Alexander Černý, MP
- Kateřina Konečná, MEP

Czech Social Democratic Party

- Petra Buzková, former minister of education, youth and sports
- Jan Chvojka, MP
- Jiří Dienstbier Jr., minister of the Czech Republic for human rights and equal opportunities
- Jan Hamáček, president of the Chamber of Deputies
- Michaela Marksová, minister of labour and social affairs

Mayors and Independents

- Petr Gazdík, deputy speaker of the Chamber of Deputies and party leader

TOP 09

- Jan Horník, senator
- Stanislav Polčák, MEP
- Martin Plíšek, MP
- Karel Schwarzenberg, former first deputy prime minister (2010–2013), former minister of foreign affairs (2007–2009, 2010–2013), MP and former party leader (2009–2015)

Colombia

Denmark

Danish People's Party

- Søren Espersen

European Union

Alliance of Liberals and Democrats for Europe

- Martina Dlabajová, Czech Republic
- Nadja Hirsch, Germany

European People's Party

- Nora Berra, France (2009–14)

The Greens–European Free Alliance

- Rebecca Harms, Germany
- Linnéa Engström, Sweden

Progressive Alliance of Socialists and Democrats

- Seb Dance,* United Kingdom
- Gianni Pittella, Italy (Leader)

Finland

Swedish People's Party of Finland
- Anna-Maja Henriksson,* justice minister (2011–15) (party leader)

France

The Republicans

- Michèle Alliot-Marie, 185th foreign minister (2010–11)

Socialist Party

- Christiane Taubira, 204th justice minister (2012–16)
- Marisol Touraine, 94th social affairs minister

Germany

Alliance '90/The Greens

- Katja Dörner

Social Democratic Party

- Katarina Barley*
- Manuela Schwesig, family affairs minister
- Frank-Walter Steinmeier, 13th foreign minister

Ireland

Independent

- Jillian van Turnhout* (2011–16)

Labour Party

- Lorraine Higgins* (2011–16)

Netherlands

Democrats 66

- Alexander Pechtold, government reform minister (2005–06) (party leader)

GroenLinks

- Jesse Klaver

Labour Party

- Diederik Samsom

New Zealand

Labour Party

- David Shearer, 33rd leader of the opposition (2011–13)
- Megan Woods

National Party

- Jami-Lee Ross
- Jono Naylor

Green Party

- James Shaw

Norway

Center Party

- Marit Arnstad, 28th transport minister (2012–13)
- Jenny Klinge
- Geir Pollestad
- Anne Tingelstad Wøien

Christian Democratic Party

- Hans Olav Syversen
- Anders Tyvand

Conservative Party

- Henrik Asheim
- Tina Bru
- Peter Christian Frølich
- Kristin Ørmen Johnsen
- Arve Kambe
- Siri A. Meling
- Erik Skutle
- Ove Bernt Trellevik

Labour Party

- Marianne Aasen
- Terje Aasland
- Rigmor Aasrud, gov. admin. minister (2009–13)
- Åsmund Grøver Aukrust
- Jan Bøhler
- Else-May Botten
- Lise Christoffersen
- Gunvor Eldegard
- Hege Haukeland Liadal
- Ingrid Heggø
- Kari Henriksen
- Martin Henriksen
- Per Rune Henriksen
- Anniken Huitfeldt, labour minister (2012–13)
- Ingvild Kjerkol
- Tove Karoline Knutsen
- Stein Erik Lauvås
- Sonja Mandt
- Torgeir Micaelsen
- Odd Omland
- Helga Pedersen, fisheries minister (2005–09)
- Magne Rommetveit
- Kåre Simensen
- Tone Sønsterud
- Arild Stokkan-Grande
- Knut Storberget, justice minister (2005–11)
- Eirin Kristin Sund
- Anette Trettebergstuen
- Lene Vågslid
- Truls Wickholm

Liberal Party

- Trine Skei Grande (party leader)
- Ketil Kjenseth
- Iselin Nybø
- Sveinung Rotevatn

Progress Party

- Tor André Johnsen

Pakistan

Movement for Justice

- Shah Mehmood Qureshi, 20th foreign minister (2008–11)

Pakistan People's Party

- Farahnaz Ispahani* (2008–12)

Spain

Spanish Socialist Workers' Party

- Pedro Sánchez* (2009–11; 2013–16)

Sweden

Centre Party

- Annie Lööf, enterprise minister (2011–14) (party leader)

The Liberals

- Jan Björklund, education minister (2007–14) (party leader)
- Birgitta Ohlsson, 5th European affairs minister (2010–14)

Moderate Party

- Anna Kinberg Batra (party leader)

Social Democratic Party

- Margot Wallström, 42nd foreign minister

Tanzania

Alliance for Change and Transparency

- Zitto Kabwe* (2005–15) (party leader)

Party of the Revolution

- January Makamba

United Kingdom

Conservative Party

- Gregory Barker,* climate change minister (2010–14)
- Simon Burns, transport minister (2012–13)
- Julian Fellowes (Note: Academy Award winner) (Note: Emmy Award winner)
- George Osborne, first sec. of state (2015–16)

Labour Party

- Roberta Blackman-Woods*
- Yvette Cooper,* shadow home sec. (2011–15)
- Jeremy Corbyn* (opposition leader)
- Gloria De Piero, shadow youth minister (2015–16)
- Stephen Doughty*
- Angela Eagle, shadow first sec. (2015–16)
- Chris Elmore*
- Mike Gapes*
- Lilian Greenwood, shadow transport sec. (2015–16)
- Diana Johnson
- Barbara Keeley,* dep. leader of the House of Commons (2009–10)
- Siobhain McDonagh
- Chi Onwurah*
- Rachel Reeves, shadow Social Security sec. (2013–15)
- Jonathan Reynolds*
- Tulip Siddiq*
- Owen Smith,* shadow Social Security sec. (2015–16)
- Karin Smyth
- Jo Stevens,* shadow Wales sec.
- Wes Streeting*
- Catherine West

Scottish National Party

- Angela Crawley*
- Stewart McDonald

=== Regional and municipal ministers, executive officials, legislators, and party leaders ===
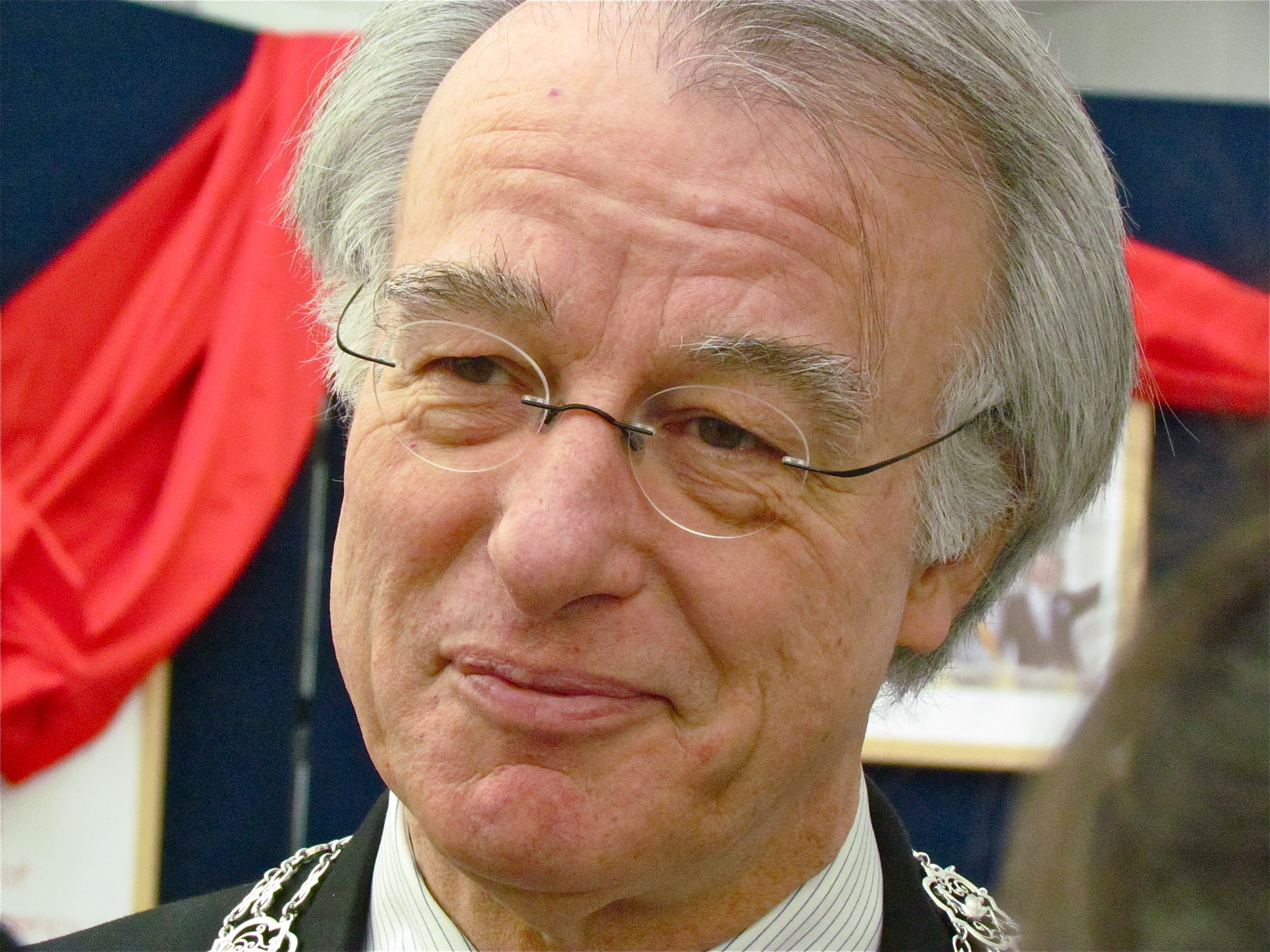
Jozias van Aartsen

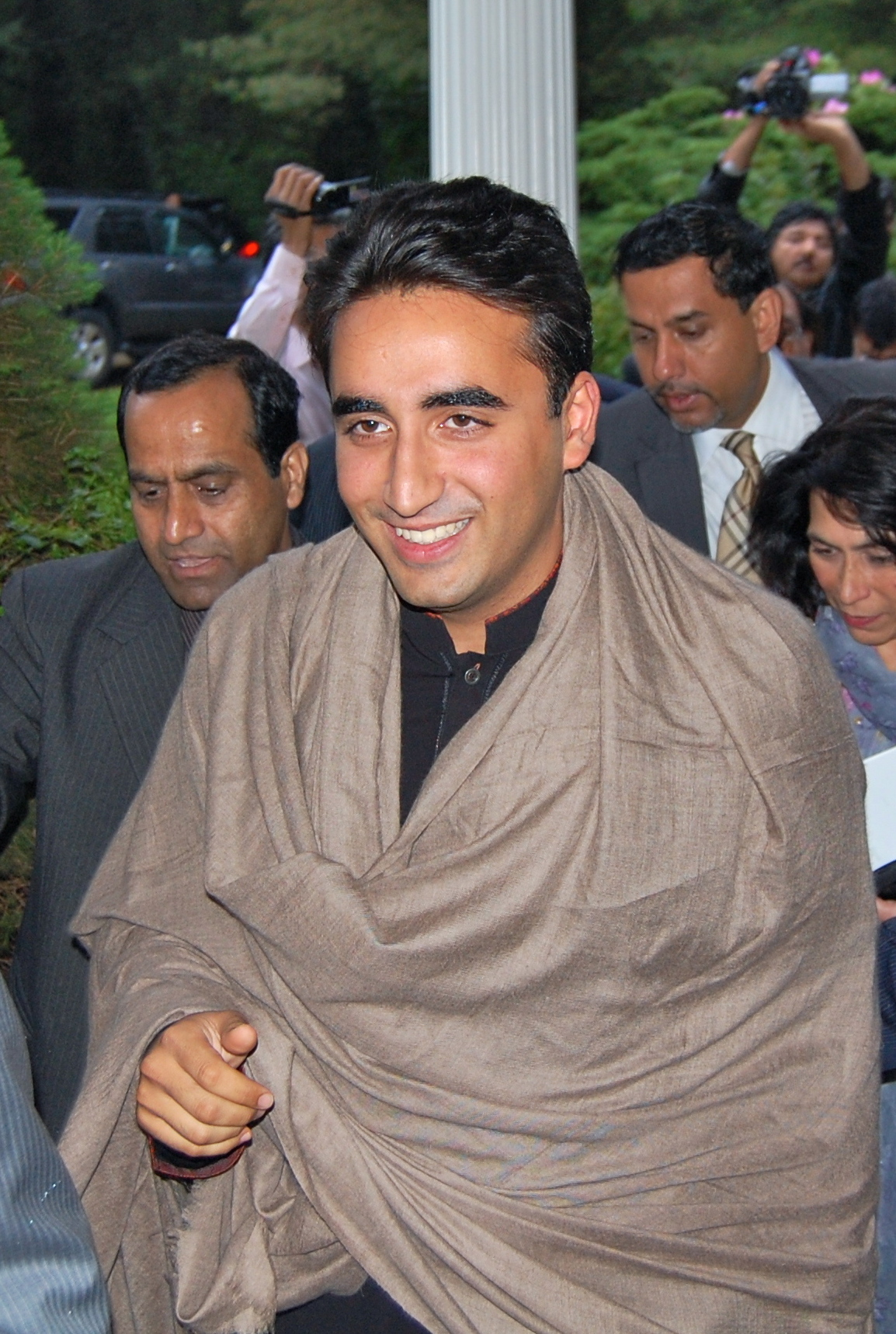
Bilawal Bhutto Zardari

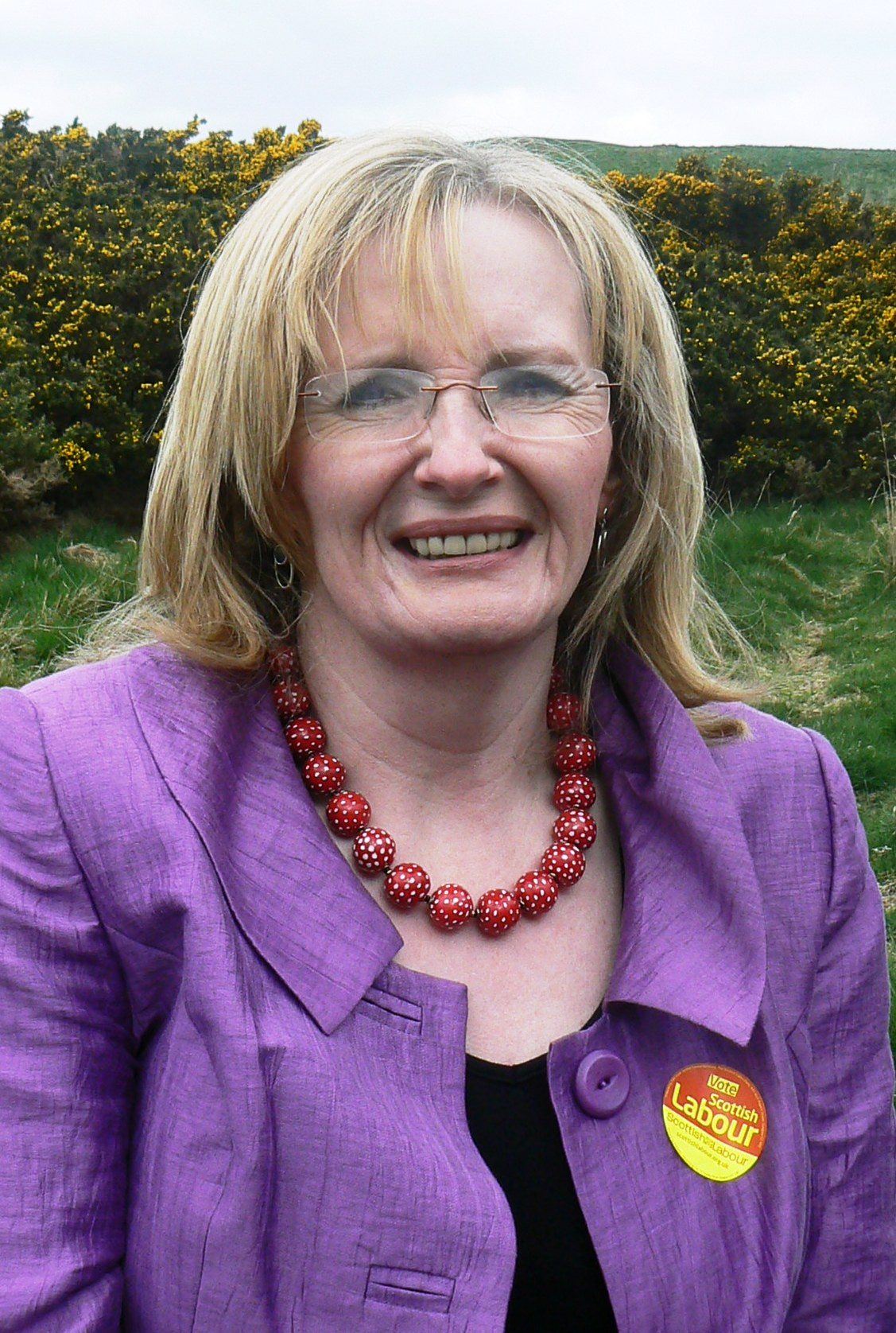
Margaret Curran

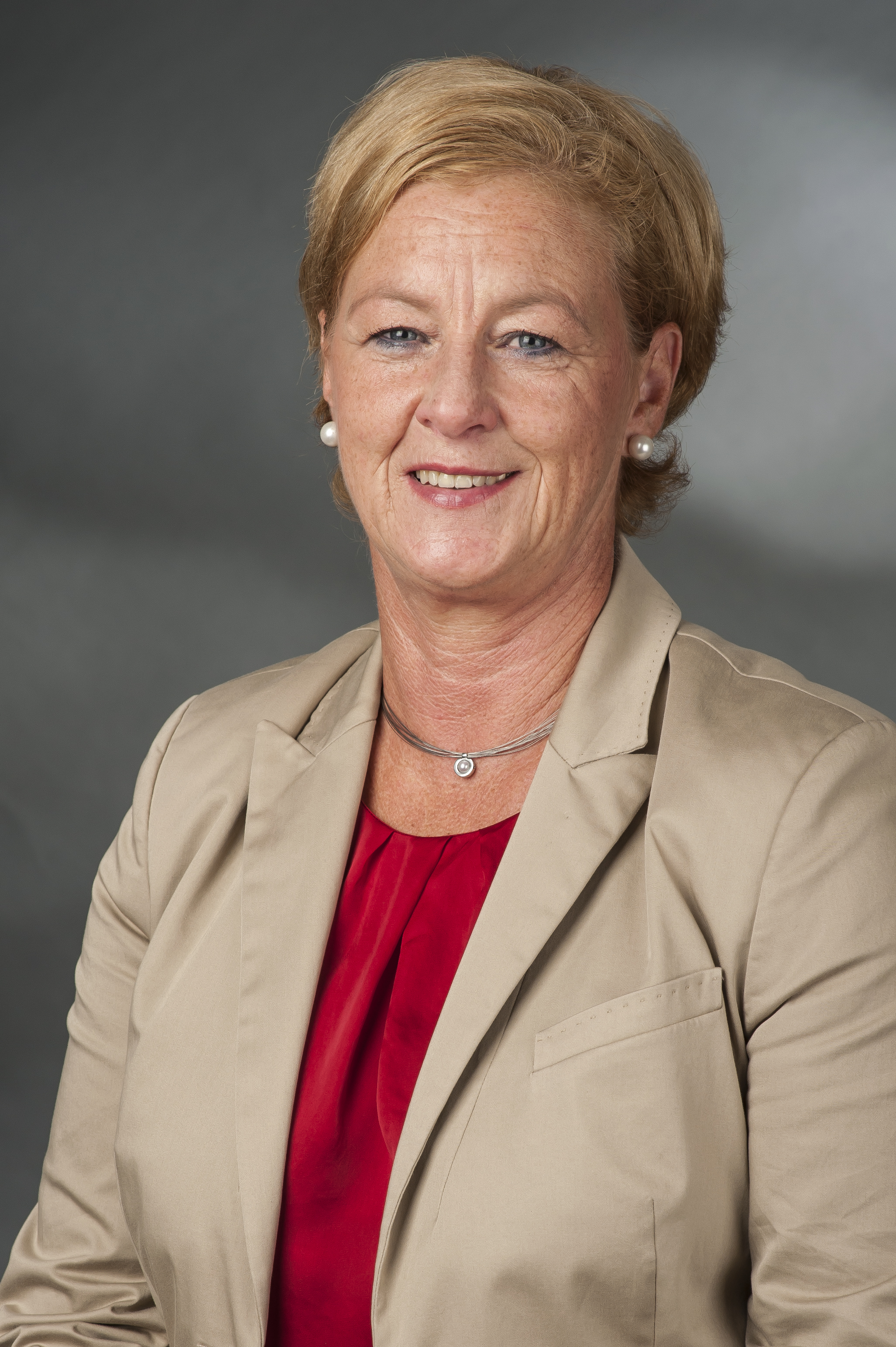
Michaela Engelmeier

Argentina

Union for Liberty

- Juan Pablo Arenaza,* member, Buenos Aires Legislature

Australia

Labor Party

- Daniel Andrews, 48th premier of Victoria
- Philip Dalidakis, member, Victorian Legislative Council
- Cameron Dick, Queensland, Australia minister of health
- Lara Giddings, 44th premier of Tasmania (2011–14)
- Tom Koutsantonis,* treasurer of South Australia
- Jenny Mikakos,* minister for families, Victorian Legislative Council
- Martin Pakula,* member, Victorian Legislative Council
- Annastacia Palaszczuk, 39th premier of Queensland
- Jaala Pulford, Victoria minister for agriculture
- Fiona Richardson,* minister for women and the prevention of family violence, Victorian Legislative Council

Canada

Ontario New Democratic Party

- Catherine Fife,* member, Ontario Provincial Parliament

Ontario Liberal Party

- Glen Murray, member, Ontario Provincial Parliament

Czech Republic

- Dana Drábová, governor of the Central Bohemian Region and chair of the State Office for Nuclear Safety

Germany

Alliance '90/The Greens

- Sven Lehmann, co-chair, Alliance '90/The Greens North Rhine-Westphalia
- Daniel Mack, member, Landtag of Hesse (2012–14)
- Katharina Schulze,* member, Landtag of Bavaria

Free Democratic Party

- Marie-Agnes Strack-Zimmermann,* member, Düsseldorf Parliament

Social Democratic Party

- Michaela Engelmeier,* member, Oberbergischer Kreistag
- Ralf Stegner,* interior minister of Schleswig-Holstein (2005–08) (party leader)

Mexico

- Jorge Guajardo, ambassador to China (2007–13)

Institutional Revolutionary Party

- Ivonne Ortega, governor of Yucatán (2007–12)

Netherlands

People's Party for Freedom and Democracy

- Jozias van Aartsen, mayor of The Hague

Nigeria

- Obiageli Ezekwesili, minister of solid minerals (2005–06) and education (2006–07)

Pakistan

Pakistan Peoples Party

- Bilawal Bhutto Zardari,* party chairman

Spain

Catalan Solidarity for Independence

- Alfons López Tena, member, Catalan Parliament (2010–12)

South Africa

African National Congress

- Phumzile Mlambo-Ngcuka, under-secretary-general of the United Nations

Democratic Alliance

- Helen Zille,* premier of the Western Cape

United Kingdom

Labour Party

- Colum Eastwood, Social Democratic and Labour Party leader & MLA for Foyle
- Margaret Curran, shadow secretary of state for Scotland (2011–15)
- Kezia Dugdale,* member, Scottish Parliament (party leader)
- Florence Eshalomi,* member, London Assembly
- Iain Gray,* member, Scottish Parliament
- Sarah Hayward, leader, Camden London Borough Council
- Sadiq Khan, mayor of London
- James-J Walsh,* member, Lewisham London Borough Council

== Democratic Party figures ==
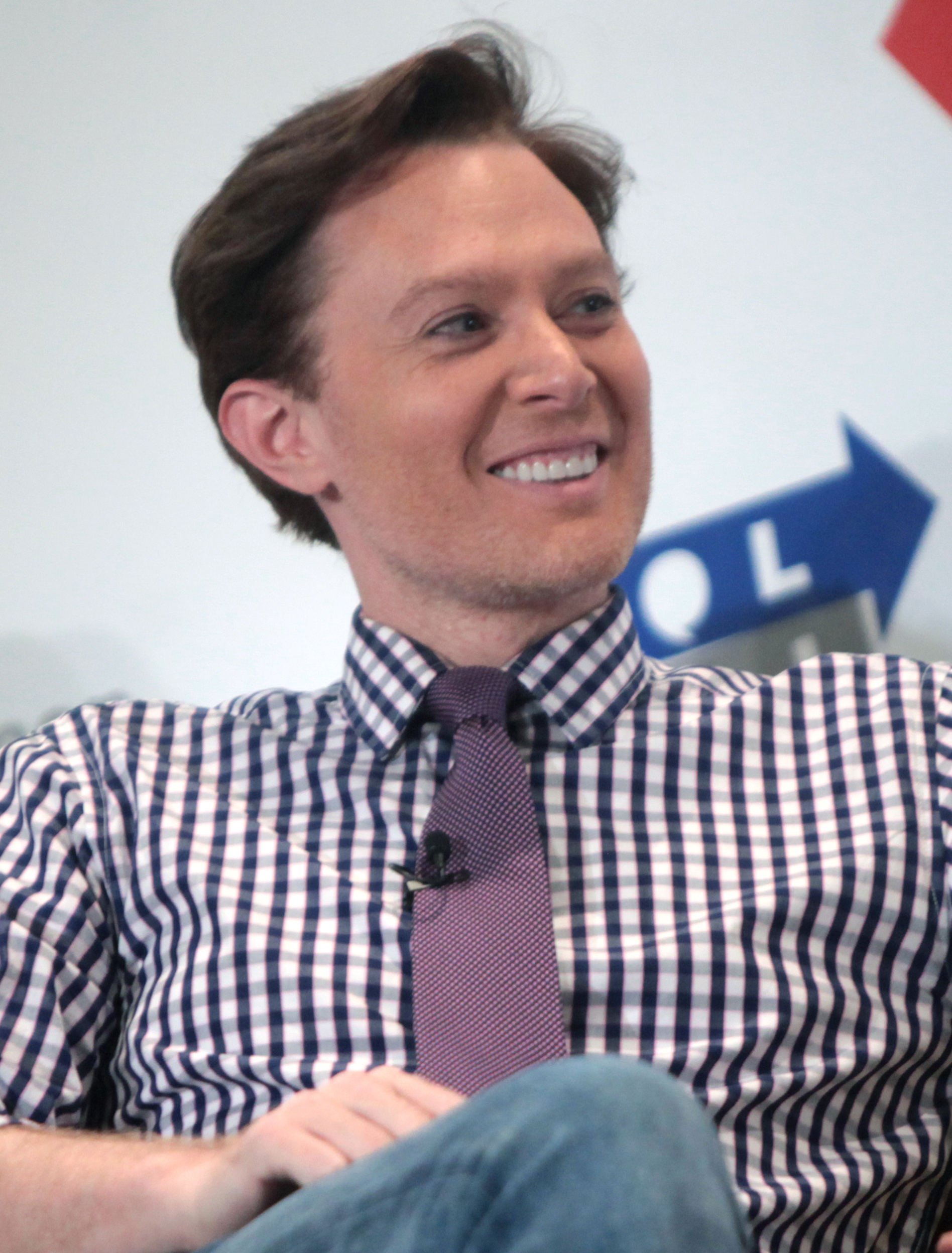
Clay Aiken

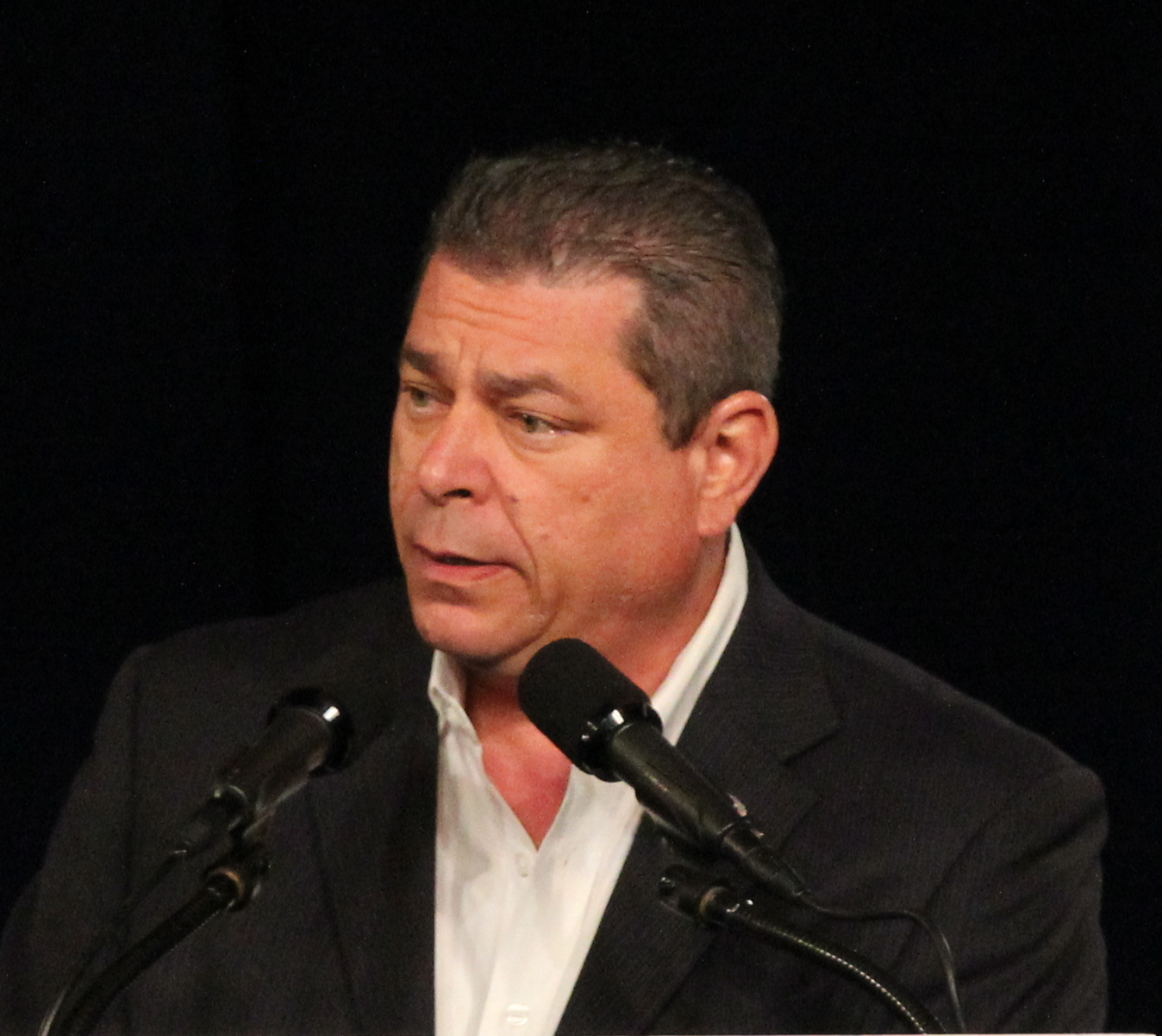
Eric C. Bauman

=== DNC members and national leaders ===
- Jill Alper, Michigan
- James C. Boland, D.C.
- Donna Brazile,* interim DNC chair (2011; 2016)
- Maria Cardona, D.C.
- Debra DeLee, chair (1994–95)
- Donald Fowler, national chair (1995–97)
- Steve Kerrigan, former CEO, Democratic National Convention
- Hildy Kuryk, former finance director
- Andrés W. López, Puerto Rico
- Bob Mulholland, California
- Shekar Narasimhan, former Indo-American Council co-chair
- George Norcross, New Jersey
- Christine Pelosi, California
- Jason Rae, Wisconsin
- Mannie Rodriguez, Colorado
- Jane Stetson, former finance chair
- Mahinder Tak, former Indo-American Council co-chair
- David Wilhelm, chair (1993–94)
- Brad Woodhouse, former communications director

=== Leaders of state and local party affiliates ===
- Eric C. Bauman, vice-chair, California Dem. Party
- Mike Erlandson, chair, Minnesota DFL Party (1999–2005)
- Chip Forrester, chair, Tennessee Dem. Party (2009–13)
- Marcel Groen, chair, Pennsylvania Dem. Party
- Christine Jennings, chair, Sarasota County, Florida Dem. Committee
- Koryne Kaneski Horbal, former chair, Minnesota DFL Party
- Martha Laning, chair, Wisconsin Dem. Party
- Mary Mancini, chair, Tennessee Dem. Party
- Win McCormack, chair, Oregon Dem. Party Pres. Council
- Jim Pederson,* chair, Arizona Dem. Party (2001–05)
- Ed Potillo, vice-chair, D.C. Dem. Party
- Kathy Sullivan, former chair, New Hampshire Dem. Party

=== Lobbyists and fundraisers ===
- Leah D. Daughtry,* CEO, 2016 Democratic National Convention
- Heather Podesta
- Robert Raymar
- David Rosen
- Hilary Rosen

=== Nominees for elected office ===
- Clay Aiken,* North Carolina-2 (2014)
- LuAnn Bennett, Virginia-10 (2016)
- Fred DuVal, Arizona gubernatorial (2010)
- Sean Eldridge, New York-19 (2012)
- Chuck Hassebrook, Nebraska gubernatorial (2014)
- Mike McWherter, Tennessee gubernatorial (2010)
- Khary Penebaker,* Wisconsin-5 (2016)
- Christie Vilsack, IA-4 (2012)

=== Strategists, media advisors, operatives, speechwriters, and pollsters ===
- Jeremy Bird
- Seth Bringman
- Stephanie Cutter, dep. manager, Obama for America
- Steve Elmendorf, dep. manager, John Kerry for President
- Peter Fenn
- Donnie Fowler*
- Karl Frisch
- Geoff Garin
- Mandy Grunwald
- Joel Johnson
- Chris Lehane
- Chirlane McCray
- Jim Messina, chairman of Obama for America
- Bob Mulholland, DNC member (California)
- Shekar Narasimhan, former co-chair, DNC Indo-American Council
- Adam Parkhomenko, executive director, Ready for Hillary
- Eric Sapp,* co-founder, the Eleison Group
- John Sasso
- Tracy Sefl
- Craig T. Smith
- Patti Solis Doyle, manager, Hillary Clinton for President
- Marc Stanley, president, National Jewish Democratic Council
- Mitch Stewart, former director, Organizing for America
- Ken Sunshine
- Ted Trimpa
- Jeff Weaver,* manager, Bernie Sanders for President
- Bernard Whitman*
- Michael Whouley
- Debbie Willhite

== Republican Party figures ==
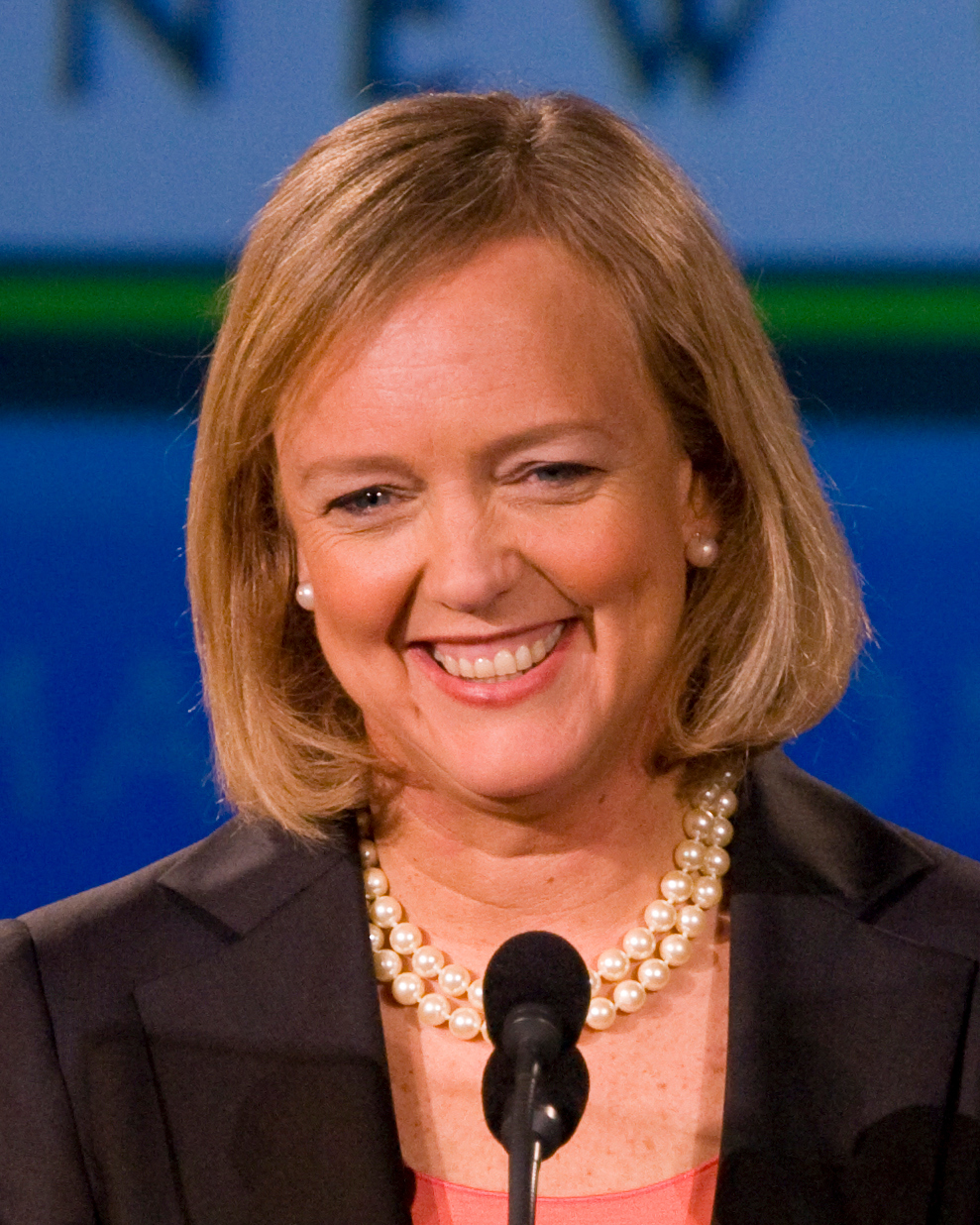
Meg Whitman

Note: Public officials belonging to the Republican Party are listed in the first section of this article.

- David Frum,* speechwriter and commentator
- Matt Higgins,* former spokesman for Rudolph Giuliani
- Jimmy LaSalvia, co-founder, GOProud
- Mike Murphy,* political consultant
- Ana Navarro,* strategist and commentator
- Mark Salter, speechwriter
- Lionel Sosa,* political consultant
- Mac Stipanovich,* lobbyist and strategist
- Meg Whitman,* 2010 gubernatorial nominee (California); CEO, Hewlett Packard Enterprise

== Organizations ==
=== Advocacy groups ===
- Alaska Federation of Natives*
- Alice B. Toklas LGBT Democratic Club
- Alliance for Retired Americans*
- American Bridge 21st Century, Super-PAC
- American Nurses Association
- Americans for Responsible Solutions*
- Brady Campaign to Prevent Gun Violence
- Correct the Record, Super-PAC
- Democracy for America*
- EMILY's List
- Every Voice*
- Equality Federation, California, Pennsylvania, South Carolina, Wisconsin
- Everytown for Gun Safety
- Fair Share Action, Super-PAC
- Feminist Majority
- Friends of the Earth*
- Harvey Milk Lesbian, Gay, Bisexual, Transgender Democratic Club*
- Hookers for Hillary
- Human Rights Campaign
- The Humane Society of the United States*
- Joint Action Committee for Political Affairs
- League of Conservation Voters
- Lesbian Political Action Committee
- Moms Demand Action
- Mothers of the Movement*
- MoveOn.org
- NARAL Pro-Choice America
- National Council of La Raza*
- National Organization for Women
- Natural Resources Defense Council
- National Women's Political Caucus
- People for the American Way*
- Planned Parenthood Federation of America
- Priorities USA Action, Super-PAC
- Ready PAC, Super-PAC
- Sierra Club
- Stonewall Democrats, Arizona
- UltraViolet*
- VoteVets.org*
- Women in the World

=== Party and legislative groups ===
Federal, state, and municipal Democratic Party chapters can be assumed to support their party's nominee.

- Alabama Democratic Conference
- California Legislative Black Caucus
- California Legislative LGBT Caucus
- Congressional Asian Pacific American Caucus Leadership PAC
- Equality PAC (formed by the Congressional LGBT Equality Caucus)
- Ohio Legislative Black Caucus
- Social Democratic Party of Germany*
- Working Families Party*

== See also ==
- List of Hillary Clinton 2016 presidential campaign non-political endorsements
- List of Democrats who opposed the Hillary Clinton 2016 presidential campaign
- List of Bernie Sanders 2016 presidential campaign endorsements
- List of Donald Trump 2016 presidential campaign endorsements
- List of Republicans who opposed the Donald Trump 2016 presidential campaign
- List of Gary Johnson 2016 presidential campaign endorsements
- List of Jill Stein 2016 presidential campaign endorsements
- List of Hillary Clinton 2008 presidential campaign endorsements
