= 2016 New Hampshire House of Representatives election =

New Hampshire House of Representatives election, 2016
- November 8, 2016

All 400 seats in the New Hampshire House of Representatives 201 seats needed for a majority
	Majority party	Minority party	Third party
Party	Republican	Democratic	Libertarian
Seats before	230	157	1
Seats won	227	173	0
Seat change	▼3	▲16	▼1
Speaker before election
Republican
Elected Speaker
Republican

The 2016 New Hampshire House of Representatives elections took place as part of the biennial United States elections. The election on November 8, 2016, the same day as the presidential election, United States Senate, United States House of Representatives, gubernatorial election and elections to the State Senate. New Hampshire voters elected all 400 state representatives from 103 districts. State representatives serve two-year terms in the New Hampshire House of Representatives. All the members elected served in the 165th New Hampshire General Court.

== Retirements ==
Name	Party	District
George Hurt	Republican	Belknap 2
Russell Dumais	Republican	Belknap 2
Brian S. Gallagher	Republican	Belknap 4
David Russell	Republican	Belknap 5
Shari Lebreche	Republican	Belknap 6
Guy Comtois	Republican	Belknap 7
Donald Wright	Republican	Carroll 8
Tara Sad	Democratic	Cheshire 1
Timothy Robertson	Democratic	Cheshire 6
Cynthia Chase	Democratic	Cheshire 8
Ben Tilton	Democratic	Cheshire 12
Kris Roberts	Democratic	Cheshire 16
Larry Phillips	Democratic	Cheshire 16
Laurence Rappaport	Republican	Coos 1
Alethea Lincoln Froburg	Democratic	Coos 3
John Tholl	Republican	Coos 5
Leon Rideout	Republican	Coos 7
Rebecca Brown	Democratic	Grafton 2
Edmond Gionet	Republican	Grafton 5
Eric Johnson	Republican	Grafton 7
Mary Cooney	Democratic	Grafton 8
Wendy Piper	Democratic	Grafton 10
Chuck Townsend	Democratic	Grafton 11
Martha Hennessey	Democratic	Grafton 12
Chris Brown	Democratic	Grafton 12
Paul Ingbretson	Republican	Grafton 15
William O'Brien	Republican	Hillsborough 5
Ken Peterson	Republican	Hillsborough 7
Theodoros Rokas	Democratic	Hillsborough 12
William Infantine	Republican	Hillsborough 13
Ralph Boehm	Republican	Hillsborough 20
Phil Straight	Republican	Hillsborough 21
Stephen Stepanek	Republican	Hillsborough 22
Robert Rowe	Republican	Hillsborough 22
Bill Goulette	Republican	Hillsborough 23
Shawn Sweeney	Republican	Hillsborough 23
James Coffey	Republican	Hillsborough 25
Jim Parison	Republican	Hillsborough 25
Jack Flanagan	Republican	Hillsborough 26
Christopher R. Adams	Republican	Hillsborough 26
Donald McClarren	Republican	Hillsborough 29
Peggy McCarthy	Republican	Hillsborough 29
Alan Cohen	Democratic	Hillsborough 30
Mary Gorman	Democratic	Hillsborough 31
Pam Brown	Democratic	Hillsborough 31
Barry Palmer	Republican	Hillsborough 32
Lee Guerette	Democratic	Hillsborough 33
Daniel Hansberry	Democratic	Hillsborough 35
Pete Silva	Republican	Hillsborough 35
Eric Estevez	Republican	Hillsborough 37
Charlene Takesian	Republican	Hillsborough 37
Frank Edelblut	Republican	Hillsborough 38
Mario Ratzki	Democratic	Merrimack 1
Harold F. French	Republican	Merrimack 2
David Kidder	Republican	Merrimack 5
Barbara French	Democratic	Merrimack 6
Geoffrey Hirsch	Democratic	Merrimack 6
June Frazer	Democratic	Merrimack 13
Helen Deloge	Democratic	Merrimack 16
Paula Bradley	Democratic	Merrimack 18
Dan McGuire	Republican	Merrimack 21
David Hess	Republican	Merrimack 24
Jason Parent	Republican	Merrimack 26
Bruce Hodgdon	Republican	Rockingham 1
Joe Duarte	Republican	Rockingham 2
Lawrence Kappler	Republican	Rockingham 3
Bill Gannon	Republican	Rockingham 4
Robert Introne	Republican	Rockingham 5
Daniel Tamburello	Republican	Rockingham 5
Beverly Ann Ferrante	Republican	Rockingham 6
Anne Priestley	Republican	Rockingham 8
Joseph Sweeney	Republican	Rockingham 8
Elisabeth Sanders	Republican	Rockingham 12
Shem Kellogg	Republican	Rockingham 14
Adam Schroadter	Republican	Rockingham 17
Alexis Simpson	Democratic	Rockingham 18
Frank Heffron	Democratic	Rockingham 18
Max Abramson	Republican	Rockingham 20
Frederick Rice	Republican	Rockingham 21
Michele Peckham	Republican	Rockingham 22
Pamela Tucker	Republican	Rockingham 23
David Borden	Democratic	Rockingham 24
Tom Sherman	Democratic	Rockingham 24
Debbie DiFranco	Democratic	Rockingham 27
Carol Bush	Republican	Rockingham 31
Jeffrey Oligny	Republican	Rockingham 34
Andrew Christie Jr.	Republican	Rockingham 37
Joshua Whitehouse	Republican	Strafford 2
David Bickford	Republican	Strafford 3
Naida Kaen	Democratic	Strafford 5
Audrey Stevens	Democratic	Strafford 7
James Gray	Republican	Strafford 8
Warren Groen	Republican	Strafford 10
James Verschueren	Democratic	Strafford 13
Bill Baber	Democratic	Strafford 14
Janice Gardner	Democratic	Strafford 15
Len DiSesa	Democratic	Strafford 16
Catherine Cheney	Republican	Strafford 17
Deanna Rollo	Democratic	Strafford 18
Kenneth Ward	Democratic	Strafford 21
Laura Jones	Republican	Strafford 24
Andrew O'Hearne	Democratic	Sullivan 3
Ernest H. Bridge	Republican	Sullivan 6

== See also ==
- United States elections, 2016
- United States House of Representatives elections in New Hampshire, 2016
- New Hampshire gubernatorial election, 2016
- List of New Hampshire General Courts
