= Rand Paul 2016 presidential campaign =

American political campaign

Rand Paul for President
- Campaign: 2016 Republican Party presidential primaries
- Candidate: Rand Paul; U.S. Senator from Kentucky (2011–present)
- Affiliation: Republican Party
- Status: Announced: April 7, 2015; Suspended: February 3, 2016
- Key people: Chip Englander (Manager); Bryan Reed (Deputy Manager); Doug Wead (Senior Advisor); Mark Spitznagel (Economic Advisor)
- Receipts: US$11,519,438 (2015-12-31)
- Slogan: Defeat the Washington machine. Unleash the American dream.
- Chant: Stand with Rand!

Website
- www.randpaul.com (archived - December 31, 2015)

The 2016 presidential campaign of Rand Paul, the junior United States senator from Kentucky, was announced on April 7, 2015, at an event at the Galt House in Louisville, Kentucky. First elected to the U.S. Senate in the 2010 election, Paul's candidacy for the Republican nomination for President of the United States in 2016 had been widely speculated since early 2013.

Leading up to his formal announcement, Paul delivered several high-profile speeches, which included filibustering the nomination of CIA Director John Brennan, speeches at Berkeley and Howard University, and meeting with community leaders in Ferguson, Missouri and Detroit, Michigan, with Paul stating that the meetings and speeches help reach his goal of broadening the Republican Party's appeal with non-traditional constituencies.

Paul suspended his campaign on February 3, 2016.

== Background ==
=== Pre-campaign speculation ===
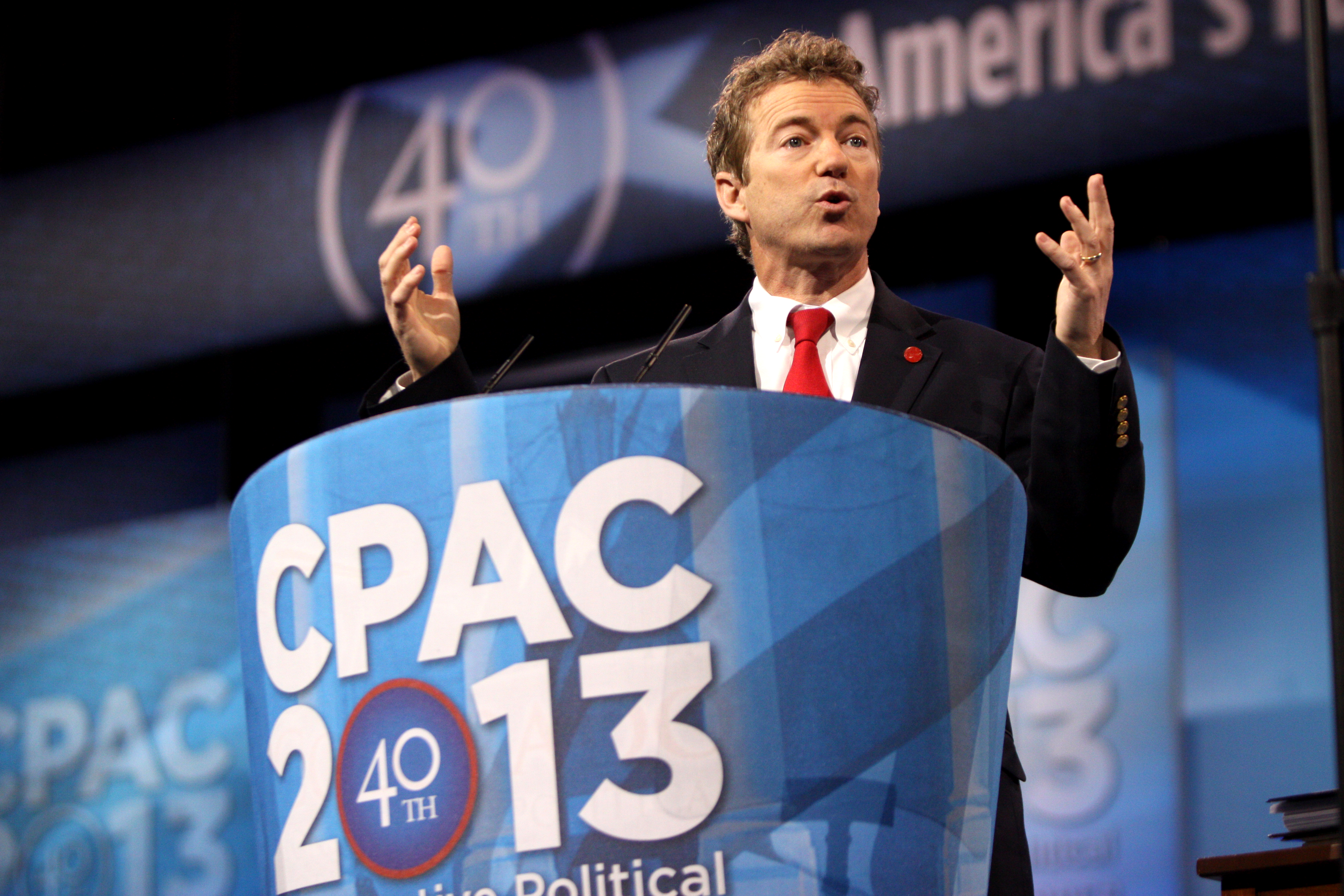
Rand Paul speaking at the 2013 Conservative Political Action Conference (CPAC) in National Harbor, Maryland on March 14, 2013

Rand Paul first acknowledged a possible 2016 presidential candidacy in January 2013. On February 13, 2013, Paul delivered the Tea Party's response to President Barack Obama's State of the Union address, prompting some pundits to consider him a potential candidate in the upcoming presidential election. On March 6–7, 2013, Paul engaged in a filibuster to delay voting on the nomination of John O. Brennan as the Director of the CIA. Paul questioned the Obama administration's use of drones and the stated legal justification for their potential use within the United States. Paul held the floor for 12 hours and 52 minutes. Following his filibuster, Paul spoke at the 2013 Conservative Political Action Conference (CPAC) in Washington D.C., where he won the presidential straw poll with 25% of the votes cast. Paul again spoke at CPAC in National Harbor, Maryland on March 7, 2014. The day after his speech, he won the presidential straw poll for the second year in a row with 31% of the votes cast, nearly triple the percentage of runner-up U.S. Senator Ted Cruz with 11%.

In April 2014, Paul spoke at the GOP Freedom Summit, an event organized by Americans for Prosperity and Citizens United, which was also attended by several other potential presidential candidates. In his speech, he insisted that the GOP has to broaden its appeal in order to grow as a party. To do so, he said it cannot be the party of "fat cats, rich people and Wall Street" and that the conservative movement has never been about rich people or privilege, "we are the middle class", he said. Paul also said that conservatives must present a message of justice and concern for the unemployed and be against government surveillance to attract new people to the movement, including young people, and Hispanic and African Americans.

==== Voter outreach efforts ====
In an October 2014 speech in Detroit, Paul stated, "The Republican Party brand sucks, and so people don't want to be a Republican, and for 80 years, African-Americans have had nothing to do with Republicans." He stated that reshaping the Republican Party's brand would be crucial to the party's success. Leading up to his decision about running for president, Paul attempted to broaden the appeal of the Republican party. He visited several historically black colleges, including Howard University, Bowie State University, and Simmons College. In addition, he visited Ferguson, Missouri, and also spoke at the Detroit Economic Club. During his remarks, Paul highlighted his efforts to improve the criminal justice system by reforming mandatory minimum sentencing laws, and restoring voting rights of individuals with non-violent felonies, which Paul believes disproportionately affects the African American and Hispanic communities. Paul also introduced his plan to create "economic freedom zones" which would help areas of high unemployment, such as Louisville or Detroit, to reduce federal regulation and taxes to boost economic growth. Paul received praise for his efforts from Lorraine Miller, acting president of the NAACP, and he also sponsored legislation with Democratic U.S. Senators Cory Booker and Kirsten Gillibrand to improve the criminal justice system for young men and women in a "cycle of poverty and incarceration". Paul's outreach to minority communities seemed to be working, as polls showed him receiving up to 29% of the African-American vote in his home state. By contrast, Republican presidential nominee John McCain received 4% of the African-American vote in 2008, and nominee Mitt Romney received 6% in 2012.

==== Dual candidacy issues ====
Kentucky law does not allow presidential (or vice-presidential) nominees to run for office in the state, meaning Paul could not concurrently run for president and reelection to the Senate. However, Paul filed to run for re-election to his Senate seat in April 2011. In March 2014, the Republican-controlled Kentucky Senate passed a bill that would allow Paul to run for both offices, but the Democratic-controlled Kentucky House of Representatives declined to take it up. During the 2014 legislative elections, Paul attempted to shift the power in the House to the Republicans, who were more likely to pass the bill. Paul spent his own campaign money in the elections, helping Republican candidates for the state house. Even if Democratic governor Steve Beshear were to veto the legislation, that veto can be overridden with a simple majority. However, the Democrats retained their 54–46 majority in the state house. Paul in turn gave his support to the idea that the Kentucky Republican Party could decide to hold a caucus in March separately from the regular primary in May, allowing for the party to have more time to pick a new senatorial candidate should Paul clinch the Republican presidential nomination, which the party agreed to do at a meeting in March 2015.

==== 2014 midterm elections ====
In addition to his own political prospects, in the lead up to the 2014 midterm elections, Paul made a point to campaign for several Senate and Congressional candidates, including Joni Ernst and Rod Blum in Iowa, former U.S. Senator Scott Brown in New Hampshire, David Perdue in Georgia, Thom Tillis in North Carolina, Mitch McConnell in Kentucky and Pat Roberts in Kansas. Paul facilitated these endorsements through his political action committee known as Rand PAC, which was able to provide funds for candidates that Paul had endorsed, as well as provide volunteer support, and air television and radio commercials in support of certain candidates. Because of Paul's appeal to younger voters and "grassroots energy", a majority of Republican campaign operatives, according to Politico, selected Paul as their top choice as a campaign surrogate. After the election, Paul launched a social media campaign titled "Hillary's Losers" which was meant to highlight many of the Democratic candidates who lost their bids for the U.S. Senate despite endorsements from former secretary of state Hillary Clinton.

Out of the nearly 20 endorsements that Paul offered in the 2014 midterm election, only three candidates were unsuccessful in their campaigns for office. In contrast, more than half of Clinton's endorsements were unsuccessful, but many political analysts regarded the 2014 midterm elections as a wave election year for Republicans.

==== Campaign structure ====
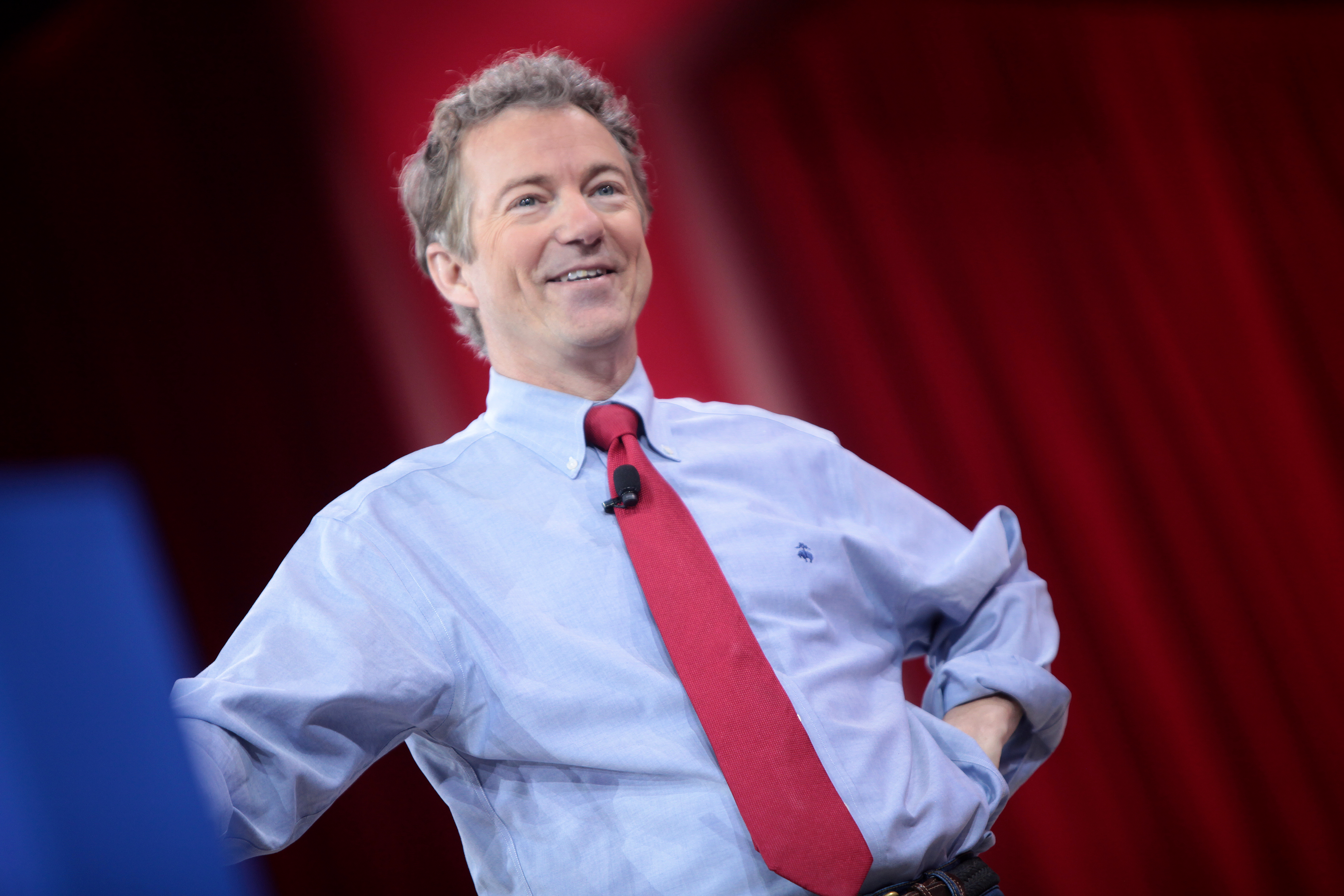
Rand Paul speaking at the 2015 Conservative Political Action Conference (CPAC) in National Harbor, Maryland on February 27, 2015.

Near the end of 2014, Paul made moves towards a presidential run, including hiring staff in several states, setting up offices, and hiring a campaign manager. In January 2015, he gained the support of Texas Republican Party Chairman Steve Munisteri, a move seen as crucial in taking on potential rivals Governor Rick Perry and Senator Ted Cruz, both with deep ties to Texas. Paul hired a digital strategist who previously worked on the Senate campaign for Ted Cruz, Vincent Harris, and a campaign manager, Chip Englander, who led businessman Bruce Rauner's successful campaign for governor in Illinois. Longtime Paul advisor Doug Stafford will stay on as a senior political advisor to the Paul campaign. Campaign operations also began in many of the early states, with the hiring of Steve Grubbs, a former chairman of the Iowa Republican Party, to run Paul's potential Iowa campaign, Michael Biundo, formerly campaign manager for Rick Santorum's 2012 presidential bid, in New Hampshire, Chris LaCivita, who advised Senator Pat Roberts and Virginia Attorney General Ken Cuccinelli in his gubernatorial bid, in South Carolina, and John Yob, a campaign operative, based in Michigan. Through his political action committee, known as Reinventing A New Direction (RAND) PAC, Paul toured many states seen as important in gathering both votes and fundraising dollars.

After former governor Mitt Romney announced that he would not seek a third presidential bid, political analyst Mark Halperin made a statement that he thought that Paul was the new frontrunner in the New Hampshire primary if it were to be held then. Polling throughout 2014, both nationally and in statewide contests, had consistently placed Paul among the top tier of candidates potentially seeking the Republican Party's nomination in the 2016 presidential election.

Several political analysts pointed to the established network of supporters that his father, Ron Paul, had garnered through his own attempts at running for President of the United States in the 2008 and 2012 elections. At the same time, other analysts stated that Ron Paul may have been more of a liability, due to his consistent opposition to foreign involvement, which may not have appealed to mainstream Republican voters. A Super PAC was formed by Ron Paul's 2012 campaign manager John Tate, known as America's Liberty PAC, which stated that it is the only Super PAC officially endorsed by Paul. The group also boasted several staff members from Campaign for Liberty, a group founded in 2008 following the Ron Paul's first unsuccessful attempt at receiving the Republican Party's nomination for president. A second SuperPAC was formed by former FreedomWorks president Matt Kibbe and Young Americans for Liberty president Jeff Frazee.

Paul spoke at CPAC 2015 and received a plurality of votes in the straw poll for his third year in a row, with 26%. On March 23, 2015, U.S. Senator Ted Cruz announced his candidacy for President of the United States, prompting some political analysts to compare Cruz's support with Paul's, stating that they are both vying for the anti-establishment wing of the party. Shortly before Cruz's announcement, Paul made it clear to supporters and members of the media that he would be making an announcement on April 7, at the Galt House Hotel in Louisville regarding the 2016 presidential election, and would follow up his announcement with a four-state tour of various early primary states, including Iowa, New Hampshire, South Carolina and Nevada.

=== Pre-primary campaign developments ===
Going into the summer, Paul hosted several town halls, meet and greets, and rallies in early states and other important states for fundraising, and voter contacts. On May 11, Paul returned to New Hampshire and held a town hall meeting in Londonderry, along with several dozen lawmakers who endorsed his campaign, and continued his campaign swing to southeastern Iowa, concluding with a "cattle call" style Lincoln dinner hosted by the Republican Party of Iowa in Des Moines. Paul also spoke outside Independence Hall in Philadelphia, and participated in a discussion at the National Constitution Center before returning to Washington, D.C., in order to tend to business in the United States Senate.

=== Filibuster in the U.S. Senate ===
The week before Memorial Day, he announced his intention to block any attempt at renewing the Patriot Act, in which certain provisions regarding warrantless surveillance of Americans were set to expire at the end of the month. In order to accomplish this, Paul began to filibuster the legislation on May 20, 2015, and spoke for approximately 10 1/2 hours. His campaign utilized social media in order to promote the Senator's campaign, using the hashtag "Stand With Rand", which was introduced during Paul's previous filibuster. Following his filibuster, the Senate attempted to move forward with the legislation, holding a series of votes shortly after midnight on the Saturday before Memorial Day weekend, which failed to get the 3/5 supermajority needed to invoke cloture. Paul objected to all further attempts to extend the Patriot Act's provisions which had been put forth by Majority Leader Mitch McConnell (requiring unanimous consent), causing them to delay debate of the legislation until the following week.

== Campaign ==
=== Announcement of candidacy ===
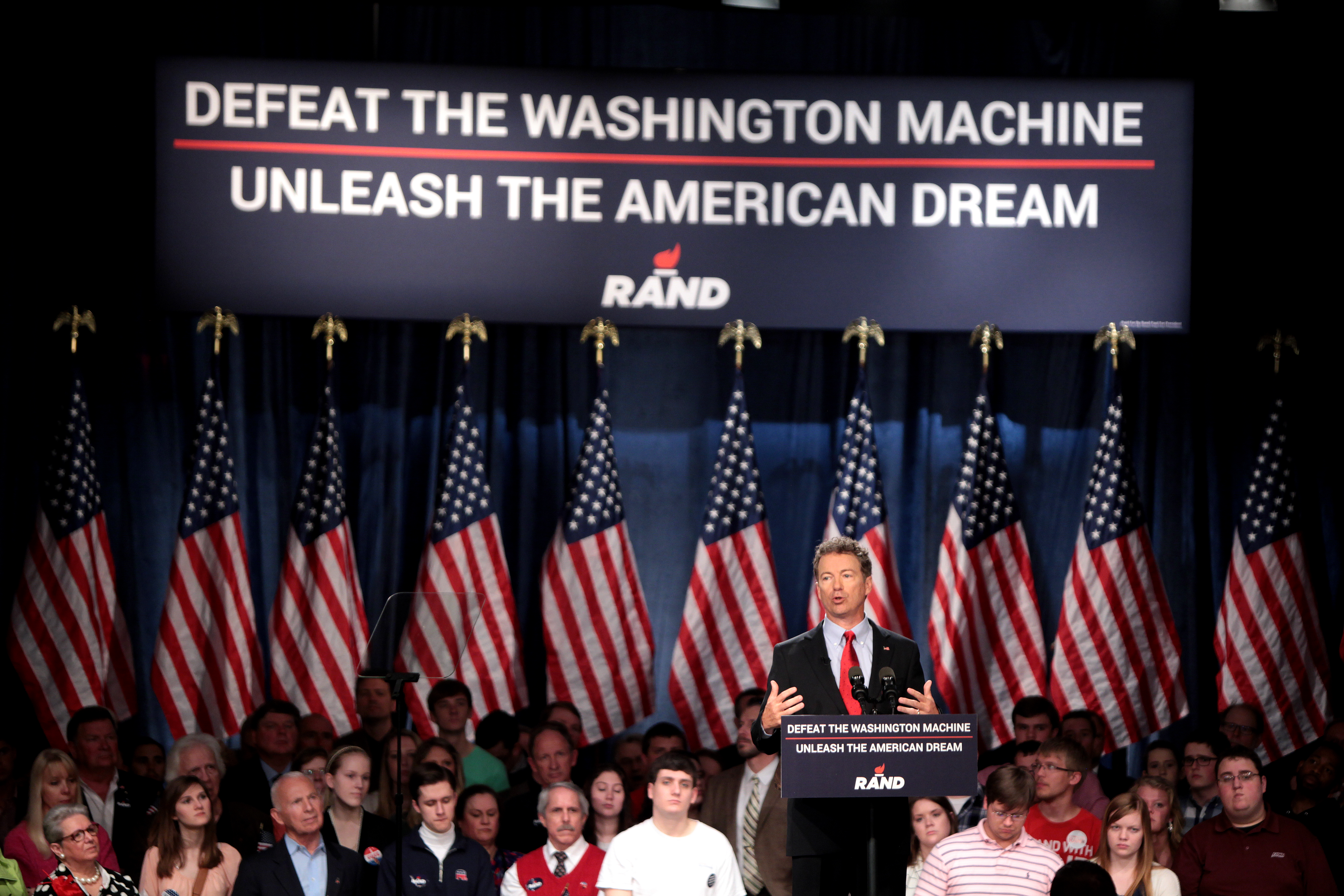
Rand Paul at the launch of his presidential campaign at the Galt House Hotel in Louisville, Kentucky, on April 7, 2015

Paul officially announced his presidential candidacy for the Republican party on April 7, 2015, at the Galt House in Louisville, Kentucky. His announcement featured several testimonials from supporters, and endorsements from prominent individuals, including former U.S. Congressman J. C. Watts, as well as his wife, Kelley who introduced her husband. At the conclusion of his speech, Paul stated, "To rescue a great country now adrift, join me as together we seek a new vision for America. Today I am announcing, with God's help and with liberty lovers everywhere, that I am putting myself forward as a candidate for President of the United States." Within a day of his announcement, Paul raised $1 million, slightly outpacing fellow Republican presidential candidate Ted Cruz. However, Paul also faced a $1 million ad campaign against him, criticizing his foreign policy views. Paul was also criticized for having heated exchanges with the press. Paul is known for being accessible to the media but he admitted in an interview on CNN to being "short-tempered" with the press.

=== Beginning of campaign ===
After announcing his campaign in Louisville, Kentucky, Paul embarked on a tour of four early states, which included stops in Milford, New Hampshire, Mt. Pleasant, South Carolina, Iowa City, Iowa, and Las Vegas, Nevada. Each event also featured local testimonials and endorsements of Paul's candidacy, including several state legislators, and members of Congress. Following his four state tour, Paul appeared on several Sunday morning shows to discuss his candidacy, with interviews on Meet the Press on NBC, Face the Nation on CBS, and State of the Union on CNN.

A week after his announcement, Paul spoke at the First in the Nation Republican Leadership Summit in Nashua, New Hampshire, along with more than a dozen other announced and potential Republican candidates. In his speech, Paul highlighted the large amount of political baggage of Democratic candidate Hillary Clinton, who announced her own candidacy only a few days after Paul. Paul has been a leading critic of Clinton, which has included her time as Secretary of State and her handling of the situation in Benghazi, as well as more recent controversies involving her email server, and foreign contributions to the Clinton Foundation.

=== Shift in strategy ===
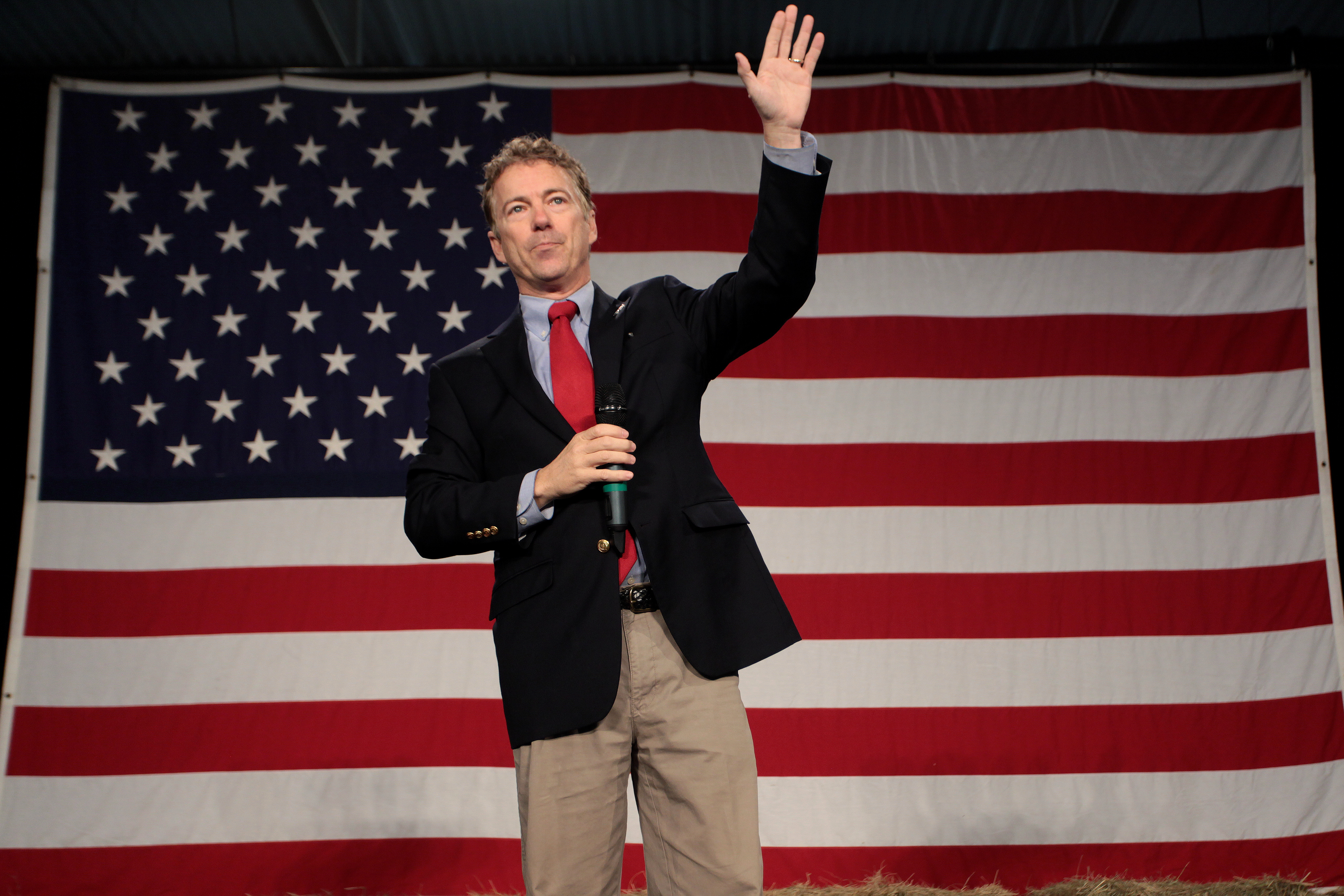
Senator Paul speaking at an event hosted by the Iowa Republican Party in October 2015.

Several media outlets noted that Paul's campaign began relatively quietly. Whereas candidates like Donald Trump and Bernie Sanders were regularly appearing in the news, CNN noted Paul "has been working the campaign trail quietly, taking a deliberate approach to national media and choosing his battles carefully." This was seen as unusual, since Paul was known for being vocal and strategically standing out. In an interview with CNN, Doug Stafford, one of Paul's strategists, commented "Y'all may be too busy covering the newest thing each week to have noticed, but we are running hard, running strong, and running all over the country... It's a marathon, not a sprint." In June 2015, facing declining poll numbers, Paul's campaign appeared to shift strategies, with Paul attempting to appeal more to the Republican Party's base. Nick Gillespie, the editor of Reason.com, a libertarian-leaning news service, commented that Paul appeared to do much better when he took more libertarian positions, commenting, "All of the moments where he stands out – where he captures not just the political imagination, but the public American imagination – are the most libertarian."

Paul's marketing also varied from that of other candidates. In October 2015, Paul broadcast an entire day of campaigning, during which he read and answered questions, one of which asking if he was still running for president. In response, Paul said, "I don't know, I wouldn't be doing this dumbass livestreaming if I weren't" before confirming he was and asking if the footage could not be edited. The line led to the creation of a satirical T-shirt by the Paul campaign.

=== Debate performances ===
At the Fox News Cleveland debate, in response to Chris Christie opposing his stance on unwarranted wiretapping which the governor was in favor of, Paul mentioned his previous attempts at ending searches without warrants of Americans' records. Christie charged Paul with putting his country at risk while "cutting speeches on the floor of the Senate, then putting them on the Internet within half an hour to raise money" for his campaign. Reaction to the exchange was mixed. Some commentators believed Christie had succeeded in defending himself, though Conor Friedersdorf of The Atlantic viewed Paul as having won based on substance alone.

Paul indicated in December 2015 that he would not participate in any undercard debate should he not qualify for the main stage, reasoning that his campaign was "first-tier" and would be demoted in participating in a "second-tier debate". Though Paul did not meet the qualifications for that month's CNN debate, entailing that a candidate poll at least at 3.5% nationally or 4% in either Iowa or New Hampshire, a Fox News poll released on December 13 had Paul with 5% of support in the Iowa Republican presidential caucus, allowing his inclusion. Paul announced on January 11 that he would not participate in that month's South Carolina debate after being relegated to the undercard one. Though not present for the debate, Paul's name was briefly shouted by protestors.

=== Fundraising ===
==== Beginning of campaign ====
On the first day of his campaign, Paul raised over $1 million. At the launch of his candidacy, Paul's campaign unveiled his official online campaign store, which caught the attention of many political media analysts with several humorously themed items, in addition to the traditional campaign gear. Some of the items included Rand Paul themed Beats headphone skins, Ray-Ban sunglasses, as well as a broken email hard drive promoted as "Hillary's Hard Drive", in reference to the scandal involving her use of a personal email address during her time as secretary of state. All of the items were intended as fundraisers for his campaign. Doug Stafford, one of Paul's political staffers, said he thought Paul would need to raise $50 million by March 2016 in order to remain viable as a candidate, which he felt was possible.

According to online fundraising data from the first several weeks of Paul's campaign, a majority of donations came from small dollar contributions, as well as from rural cities and towns. More than a quarter of online donors listed addresses in communities with populations of less than 10,000. The average donation hovered around $60 during the initial stages of the campaign.

==== Early campaign ====
Following his initial announcement, Paul's campaign had lackluster fundraising. For the quarter ending on June 30, 2015, Paul's campaign reported receiving $7 million, far behind that of the $14 million raised by Ted Cruz, $12 million for Marco Rubio and $11 million for Jeb Bush. When adding fundraising by Super PACs and other outside groups, Bush's total was $114 million, while Cruz had $52 million and Rubio had $44 million, while the major Super PACs supporting Paul raised over $5.7 million.

On June 30, 2015, Paul held the first ever major-party fundraiser with the marijuana industry, which he did at the National Cannabis Industry Association's business summit in Denver, Colorado. The 2016 election is the first to take place following the legalization of recreational marijuana use. At the time of the fundraiser, marijuana was legal in three states.

=== Polling ===
In addition to his three consecutive wins in the CPAC straw polls from 2013 to 2015, Paul has also performed well in a handful of early straw polls as well as some statewide polls. In March 2015, Paul came in second in the straw poll held by Georgia's Association of Republican County Chairmen, only behind Wisconsin Governor Scott Walker.

One statewide poll where Paul consistently performed well was in the crucial swing state of Colorado. In numerous polls from Quinnipiac University and Public Policy Polling, Paul was the one Republican who consistently led Hillary Clinton in Colorado, with such poll results dating back to late 2013. In four consecutive polls from early 2014 to mid-2014, he was the only Republican who led Clinton in the state. Paul also performed well, even against Clinton, in other states such as Pennsylvania, Ohio, and Iowa.

By the latter part of 2015, Paul's support had waned, with him coming in 7th place at 4% in CNN poll released in September and dropping further in November to 2% in a KBUR/Monmouth poll.

=== Iowa caucus and campaign suspension ===
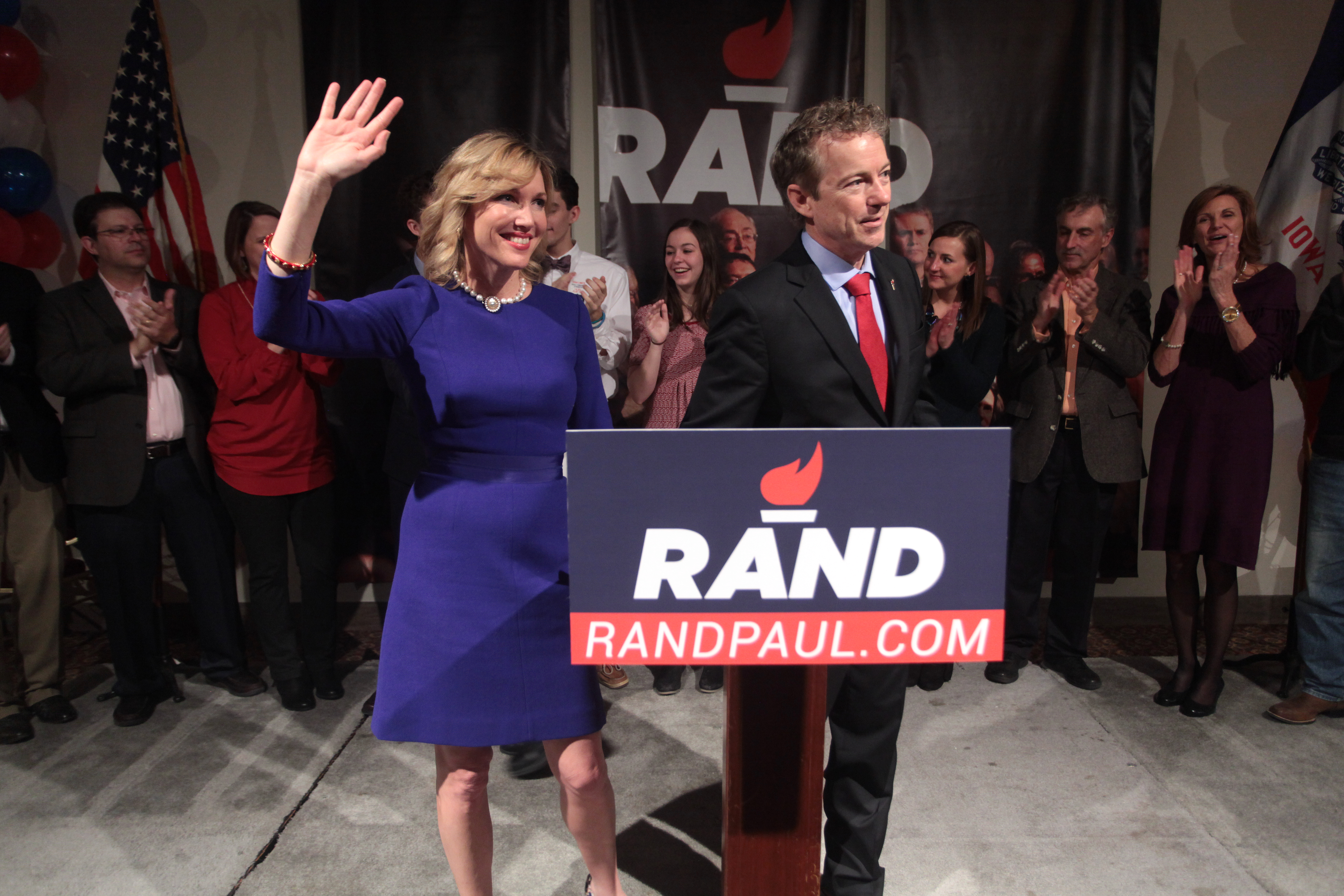
Paul, and his wife Kelley, speaking at his presidential campaign's final campaign event on the night of the Iowa caucus.

After finishing fifth place in the Iowa Caucus with 4.5% of the vote and inadequate funding, Paul dropped out of the race on February 3, 2016, to focus on his re-election to the Senate. On March 1, Paul posted on Twitter that he would un-suspend his campaign if the New Hampshire Union Leader newspaper endorsed him and declared a redo of the New Hampshire primary.

== Political positions ==
The policy positions taken by Paul in the lead-up to 2016 included NSA reform, cooperation with Iran, reducing the budget deficit and decriminalizing marijuana.

== Endorsements ==
Rand Paul endorsements

U.S. Senators (current)

- Mitch McConnell, Kentucky, also Senate Majority Leader

U.S. Representatives (current and former)

- Florida: Curt Clawson
- Idaho: Raúl Labrador (later endorsed Ted Cruz)
- Illinois: Joe Walsh (former)
- Michigan: Justin Amash
- North Carolina: Walter B. Jones Jr.
- Wyoming: Cynthia Lummis.
- Four from Kentucky: Andy Barr, Brett Guthrie, Thomas Massie, Ed Whitfield
- Oklahoma: J. C. Watts
- South Carolina: Mick Mulvaney
- Texas: Ron Paul (former, also father of the candidate, and 1988/2008/2012 presidential candidate)

International political figures

- Nigel Farage, British MEP and leader of the UK Independence Party
- Jørund Rytman, Norwegian MP (Progress Party)

Republican National Committee members (former)

- A.J. Spiker, chair of IA GOP (former)
- Steve Munisteri, chair of TX GOP (2010–2015)
- Chuck Yob, Republican National Committee member from Michigan (former)

Republican Liberty Caucus members (former)

Statewide officials (former)

- Andrew Napolitano, New Jersey Superior Court judge (former) and television personality (also professor at BLS)

State legislators

- Two Colorado State Senators: Scott Renfroe (former), Owen Hill
- Connecticut State Senator: Rob Kane.
- Two Iowa State Representatives: Steve Sukup (former, also ran for Governor'02) (See also Steve Grubbs)
- Kansas State Representative: Brett Hildabrand
- Kentucky State Senator: Ralph Alvarado
- Maine State Senator: Eric Brakey
- Two Michigan State Representatives: Tom Barrett, Tom McMillin (former)
- Two Minnesota State Senators: Roger Chamberlain, Branden Petersen (former)
- Two Members of the Nevada Assembly: Shelly M. Shelton, John Moore
- Two New Hampshire State Senators: Andy Sanborn, Kevin Avard
- Thirty-nine New Hampshire State Representatives: Christopher Adams, Glen Aldrich, Keith Ammon, Ralph Boehm, Spec Bowers (2010–2012), Paul Brown (former), Ed Comeau, Dan Dwyer (1984–1986 also Merrimack Town Councillor), Eric Eastman, Bart Fromuth, Larry Gagne, Joseph Hannon, Paul Harrington (2002–2004), Laura Jones, Shem Kellogg, Joseph Lachance, Bruce MacMahon (2010–2012 also teacher at ASD), Robert Malone (2010–2012), Pam Manney (2004–2008 also NH GOP vice-chair 2011–2012), Andrew Manuse (former), James McConnell, Dan McGuire, Mark McLean, Paul Mirski (former), David Murotake, Keith Murphy, Jim Parison, Finlay Rothhaus (1991–1995 also Merrimack Town Councillor), Eric Schleien, Brian Seaworth, Tammy Simmons, Victoria Sullivan, Norm Tregenza (2010–2012), Mark Warden (2010–2014 and former NHLA chair), Nick Zaricki., Elizabeth Ferreira, Tyler Simpson (former), Jason Osborne, Cameron DeJong (former)
- South Carolina State Senator: Tom Davis
- Two South Carolina State Representatives: Michael Pitts, Peter McCoy
- Texas State Senator: Don Huffines
- Utah State Senator: Mark B. Madsen
- Utah State Representative: Jake Anderegg
- Three Vermont State Representatives: Tom Burditt, Janssen Willhoit, Paul Dame
- Washington State Representative: Cary Condotta
- West Virginia State Delegate: Michael Ilhe.
- Two Wyoming State Representatives: Tyler Lindholm, Kendell Kroeker

Businesspeople

- Walter Block, economist at LOYNO
- Patrick M. Byrne, CEO of Overstock.com
- John Mackey, co-CEO & co-founder of Whole Foods
- Peter Schiff, stockbroker, author & 2010 candidate for US Senate
- Mark Spitznagel, American investor, derivatives trader, author, and farmer.
- Jeff Yass, owner of Susquehanna Partners investment firm

Celebrities, commentators, and activists

- James D. Schultz, political activist and 2018 New York State Assembly candidate. (Later endorsed Gary Johnson)
- Chuck Baldwin, political activist and 2008 Constitution Party presidential nominee
- Christopher R. Barron, political activist
- Tyler Ricks, Idaho political activist (Later supported Ted Cruz)
- Ed Crane, activist & co-founder of Cato Institute
- Jonathan Davis, lead singer of Korn
- Bruce Fein, lawyer and commentator, former ADAG (1981–82) under the Reagan DOJ
- David D. Friedman, economist, legal scholar, son of Milton Friedman
- Don Frye, wrestler
- Nat Hentoff, columnist
- Alex Jones, radio host
- Eric July, rapper
- Matt Kibbe, former president of FreedomWorks
- Belle Knox, pornographic actress
- Karen Kwiatkowski, political activist, retired U.S. Air Force Lieutenant Colonel, 2012 candidate for Congress from Virginia's 6th district
- Philip Labonte, lead singer of All That Remains
- Pat Miletich, mixed martial artist & sports commentator
- CJ Pearson, conservative activist (subsequently withdrew his endorsement of Paul and endorsed Ted Cruz)
- Andrew Sullivan, political commentator & blogger
- Chael Sonnen, former martial artist
- John Stagliano, entrepreneur
- John Stossel, media pundit
- Vince Vaughn, actor
- Doug Wead, blogger & former Special Assistant to President George H. W. Bush
- Alabama: Stephen P. Gordon (political consultant, worked for Badnarik'04).

== See also ==
- Electoral history of Rand Paul
- Political positions of Rand Paul
- Nationwide opinion polling for the 2016 United States presidential election
- 2016 Republican Party presidential primaries
- 2016 Republican Party presidential candidates
