= Lisa Freeman (politician) =

American politician

Member of the New Hampshire House of Representatives
- Incumbent
- Assumed office December 4, 2024 Serving with Douglas Trottier
- Preceded by: Nikki McCarter
- Constituency: Belknap 8th
- In office December 7, 2016 – December 5, 2018 Serving with Amanda Bouldin
- Preceded by: Theodoros Rokas
- Succeeded by: Andrew Bouldin
- Constituency: Hillsborough 12th

Personal details
- Born: Lisa Marie Lepera; 1961 (age 64–65)
- Party: Republican
- Spouse: Neil Thomas Freeman (died 2023)
- Education: Labouré College; North Shore Community College

Lisa Marie Freeman (née Lepera; born 1961) is an American politician. She is a member of the New Hampshire House of Representatives from the Belknap 8th district. A Republican, she represents the towns of Belmont, Sanbornton, and Tilton.

She attended Winthrop High School in Winthrop, Massachusetts. Freeman was first elected to the New Hampshire House of Representatives in the 2016 election, receiving less votes than Amanda Bouldin but three more votes than her later husband Andrew Gregoire who would later take her surname. Freeman and her late husband lived in Manchester before moving to Tilton in 2021. In July 2021, she filed to run for ward clerk of Ward 5 and for the ward seat on the Manchester Board of School Committee, but said a week later she would imminently move to Tilton so she could not meet the domicile requirements.

She married Neil Thomas Freeman, the son of Virginia (née Simms) and David Freeman. He was a veteran of the United States Army and a long time employee of the United States government, working for the United States Postal Service, the United States Department of Veterans Affairs, and United States Immigration and Customs Enforcement before his death at the West Roxbury VA Medical Center on November 22, 2023.

Her September 11, 2025, open letter in the New Hampshire Union Leader called for local elections to be held the same day as the state primary, and for local elections to be partisan.

== Electoral history ==
New Hampshire House of Representatives general election for the Belknap 8th district, 2024 Source:
Party	Candidate	Votes	%
Republican	Douglas Trottier	4,569	31.1
Republican	Lisa M. Freeman	4,445	30.2
Democratic	Sheryl Anderson	3,014	20.5
Democratic	Don House	2,680	18.2
Total votes		14,708	100

Manchester Board of School Committee election, November 5, 2019 Source:
Party	Candidate	Votes	%
Nonpartisan	Jeremy Dobson	389	44.8
Nonpartisan	Lisa M. Freeman	376	43.3
Nonpartisan	No candidate	102	11.8
Nonpartisan	Write-ins	3	0.1
Total votes		870	100

New Hampshire House of Representatives general election for the Hillsborough 12th district, 2016 Source:
Party	Candidate	Votes	%
Democratic	Amanda Bouldin	1,335	37.3
Republican	Lisa M. Freeman	1,126	31.4
Democratic	Andrew Gregoire	1,123	31.3
Total votes		3,584	100

Manchester Board of School Committee election, November 3, 2015 Source:
Party	Candidate	Votes	%
Nonpartisan	Lisa M. Freeman	486	53.5
Nonpartisan	Jeremy S. Dobson	231	25.5
Nonpartisan	No candidate	190	20.9
Nonpartisan	Write-ins	2	0.1
Total votes		909	100
