= Comtois (surname) =

Comtois is a surname. Notable people with the surname include:

- Alfred-Odilon Comtois (1876–1945), Canadian bishop
- Barbara Comtois, American politician from New Hampshire
- Guy Comtois (1961–2025), American politician from New Hampshire
- Joseph-Roland Comtois (1929–2020), Canadian politician
- Max Comtois (born 1999), Canadian ice hockey player
- Paul Comtois (1895–1966), Canadian politician
- Philippe Comtois (born 1976), Canadian diver

== See also ==
- Comtois (horse)
