= Deloge =

Deloge is a surname. Notable people with the surname include:

- Helen Deloge, American politician
- Henri Deloge (1874–1961), French runner
- Michael Deloge, American murder victim
- Valérie Deloge (born 1966), French farmer and politician

== See also ==
- Delogenes
