= Verschueren =

Verschueren is a Dutch-language toponymic surname common in Belgium. The name is a contraction of van der schueren, meaning "from the barn(s)". Forms more common in the Netherlands are Verschuren and Verschuur. Notable people with the surname include:

- Adolph Verschueren (1922–2004), Belgian racing cyclist
- Arno Verschueren (born 1997), Belgian football defender
- Cédric Verschueren (born 2004), Belgian sprinter
- Denis Verschueren (1897–1954), Belgian racing cyclist
- Etienne Verschueren (1928–1995), Belgian jazz musician and composer
- Femke Verschueren (born 2000), Belgian singer
- Frans Verschueren (born 1962), Belgian racing cyclist
- James Verschueren, American politician
- Jolien Verschueren (1990–2021), Belgian cyclo-cross cyclist
- Lisa Verschueren (born 1995), Belgian artistic gymnast
- Marcel Verschueren (1928–2008), Belgian racing cyclist
- Michel Verschueren (1931–2022), Belgian football manager
- Patrick Verschueren (born 1962), Belgian racing cyclist
- Sidonie Verschueren (fl. 1928), Belgian sprinter
- Theo Verschueren (born 1962), Belgian racing cyclist
- Victor Verschueren (1893–?), Belgian bobsledder and ice hockey player

== See also ==
- Verschuere
- Verschueren (organs), Dutch organ builders
