= Frederick Rice =

Frederick Rice may refer to:

- Sir Frederick Rice (British politician) (1866–1929), Conservative MP for Harwich
- Frederick Rice (American politician) (born 1938), member of New Hampshire House of Representatives

== See also ==
- Frederick Rice Dorn (c. 1866–1934), American architect
- Fred Rice (1918–2005), American football coach
- Fred Rice Jr. (1926–2011), American police officer for the Chicago Police Department
