= Heffron =

Heffron may refer to:

- Heffron (surname)
- Electoral district of Heffron
- Heffron, Wisconsin
- Heffron Hall (St. Mary's University)
- USAT Heffron
