= Schuur =

Schuur is a surname. Notable people with this surname include:

- Diane Schuur (born 1953), an American musician
- Jennifer Schuur, an American television writer and producer
- Walter Schuur (1910 – 2005), a German canoeist

It can also refer to Schuur (movie theater).

== See also ==
- Verschuur, a similarly spelled surname
