= Brandon Phinney =

American politician

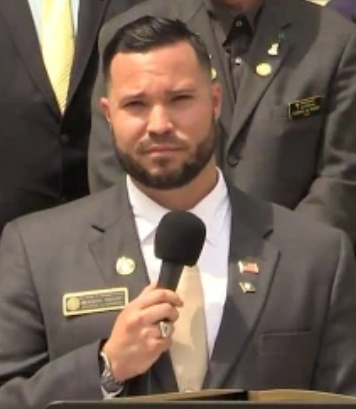
- Phinney at a press conference announcing his change in party affiliation

Member of the New Hampshire House of Representatives from the 24th Strafford district
- In office December 7, 2016 – December 5, 2018
- Preceded by: Laura Jones
- Succeeded by: Mona Perreault

Personal details
- Born: April 27, 1988 (age 38) Haverhill, Massachusetts, U.S.
- Party: Libertarian (2017–present)
- Other political affiliations: Republican (2016–2017)
- Education: Great Bay Community College; Southern New Hampshire University
- Occupation: Soldier
- Committees: State-Federal Relations and Veterans Affairs

Brandon Phinney (born April 27, 1988) is an American politician and former member of the New Hampshire House of Representatives, representing Strafford County's 24th district.

== Career ==
Phinney earned his associate degree from Great Bay Community College and his bachelor's degree from Southern New Hampshire University. In 2016, he was elected to the New Hampshire House of Representatives as a Republican, beating his Democratic opponent by 116 votes. He became notable in atheist circles as the only openly atheist Republican legislator in the United States. On June 27, 2017, he announced in a press conference that he had changed his party affiliation to Libertarian.

Phinney was defeated for re-election in a three-way race, finishing third with 10% of the total vote. He was succeeded by Republican Mona Perreault. Following his defeat, he announced he would run for Rochester City Council in 2019.

He was elected to the state House again in 2022.

== Electoral history ==
=== 2016 ===
New Hampshire House of Representatives, District Strafford 24 General Election, 2016
Party	Candidate	Votes	%
Republican	Brandon Phinney	2,323	51.3
Democratic	Karen Stokes	2,207	48.7
Total votes		4,530	100

=== 2018 ===
New Hampshire House of Representatives, District Strafford 24 General Election, 2018
Party	Candidate	Votes	%
Republican	Mona Perreault	1,720	47.2
Democratic	Jeremiah Minihan	1,548	42.5
Libertarian	Brandon Phinney (incumbent)	377	10.3
Total votes		3,645	100

== See also ==
- Max Abramson
