= Baldasaro =

Baldasaro is a surname. Notable people with the surname include:

- Al Baldasaro (born 1956), American politician
- Michael Baldasaro (1949–2016), Canadian politician and religious leader
