= Rio Tilton =

American politician

Member of the New Hampshire House of Representatives from District 37
- In office 2016–2018

Member of the New Hampshire House of Representatives from District 20
- In office August 5, 2015 – 2016
- Preceded by: Elaine Andrews-Ahearn

Personal details
- Born: Rio H. Tilton; June 15, 1996 (age 30) Seabrook, New Hampshire, U.S.
- Party: Republican
- Education: Winnacunnet High School
- Alma mater: Flagler College; University of New Hampshire

Rio H. Tilton (born June 15, 1996) is an American politician. He formerly served as a member of the New Hampshire House of Representatives representing District 37, which encompasses Rockingham County, for the Republican Party from 2016 to 2018. He previously served for Rockingham District 20, which encompasses Seabrook and Hampton Falls from 2015 to 2016, after being elected to the chamber in a special election on July 7, 2015.

== Early life and education ==
Tilton is a graduate of Winnacunnet High School, attended Flagler College and has a degree from the University of New Hampshire.
