= Hansberry =

Hansberry may refer to:

- Carl Augustus Hansberry (1895–1946), American real estate broker and political activist
- Daniel Hansberry, American politician
- Lorraine Hansberry, American playwright, A Raisin in the Sun
- Hansberry v. Lee, a 1940 U.S. Supreme Court decision that dealt with a racially restrictive covenant
