= Verschuren =

Verschuren is a Dutch toponymic surname. The name is a contraction of van der schuren, meaning "from the barn(s)". Some variant forms are Verschueren, Verschure, Verschuur and Verschuuren. Notable people with the surname include:

- Annette Verschuren, Canadian businesswoman
- Jan Verschuren (born 1962), Dutch organist
- Kamiel Verschuren (born 1968), Dutch conceptual artist
- Kees Verschuren (born 1941), Dutch sculptor and painter
- Paul Verschuren (1925–2000), Dutch Roman Catholic bishop of Helsinki
- Peter Verschuren (born 1970s), Dutch mixed martial artist
- Sebastiaan Verschuren (born 1988), Dutch swimmer

== Verschuuren ==
- Gerard Verschuuren (born 1946), Dutch geneticist and philosopher

== See also ==
- Verschuren's swamp rat, rodent native to the Democratic Republic of the Congo
