= Kenneth Peterson =

Kenneth Peterson may refer to:

- Ken Peterson (Montana politician) (born 1935), member of the Montana House of Representatives
- Ken Peterson (New Hampshire politician), member of the New Hampshire House of Representatives
- P. Kenneth Peterson (1915–1993), member of the Minnesota House of Representatives and mayor of Minneapolis
- Kenny Peterson (born 1978), American football player
