= Oligny (surname) =

Oligny is a surname.

== Notable people with the surname ==
- Huguette Oligny (1922 –2013), Canadian actress
- Jeffrey Oligny, American politician
- Jimmy Oligny (born 1993), Canadian ice hockey player

== See also ==
- Oligarchy
- Oligocene
