= Al Baldasaro =

American politician from New Hampshire

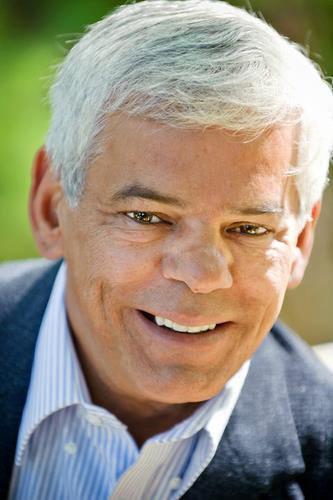

Member of the New Hampshire House of Representatives from the Rockingham 5th district
- In office December 2006 – December 7, 2022

Personal details
- Born: November 20, 1956 (age 70)
- Party: Republican
- Spouse: Judy

Alfred P. Baldasaro (born November 20, 1956) is a Republican politician from the state of New Hampshire. He is a member of the New Hampshire House of Representatives. Baldasaro lives in Londonderry and represents District 5 in Rockingham County. He is known for his strongly conservative views and provocative remarks, including one in 2016 where he called for Hillary Clinton to be "put in the firing line and shot" for which he was widely rebuked and investigated by the Secret Service.

== Career before politics ==
Baldasaro's grandfather Alfred Vellucci served as mayor of Cambridge, Massachusetts for four terms, beginning in 1971. Baldasaro served in the U.S. Marine Corps for 22 years.

== New Hampshire House of Representatives tenure ==
According to the Guardian, Baldasaro is "known as one of the most conservative—and controversial" members of the New Hampshire's 400-member House of Representatives. Baldasaro led the fight against same-sex marriage in New Hampshire.

In the 2012 Republican presidential primaries, Baldasaro supported Texas Governor Rick Perry. At a Republican primary presidential debate in 2011, the audience booed and jeered a gay Marine who had submitted a debate question about the "don't ask, don't tell" policy. When asked about the incident, Baldasaro said that he was "disgusted" by the Marine and said: "I thought the audience, when they booed the marine, I thought it was great." Baldasaro, who was criticized for the remarks by the Nashua Telegraph, defended his comments in the media, stating that it is against Department of Defense regulations to wear a PT uniform at a partisan event.

Baldasaro considered running for the United States Senate in the 2014 election but did not enter the race.

In late December 2015, in response to a Facebook post made by Democratic State Representative Amanda Bouldin's supporting breastfeeding in public and opposing a New Hampshire bill that would criminalize the exposure of women's nipples or breasts in public, Baldasaro wrote on his Facebook page, "Amanda, no disrespect, but your nipple would be the last one I would want to see. You want to turn our family beaches into a pervert show." (Note: Another state Representative, Josh Moore, a Republican, made a similar "crude" comment, which Moore deleted.) Baldasaro refused to apologize or retract his remarks. The incident prompted Republican House speaker Shawn Jasper to ask state Representatives "to act with dignity, to act with respect" in his remarks the following month at the opening of the 2016 legislative session.

Baldasaro was an advisor to Donald Trump when Trump was the Republican nominee for president in the 2016 election, and regularly appeared with him at campaign events. Baldasaro was the co-chairman of the Trump campaign's national veterans coalition.

Baldasaro was a delegate at the 2016 Republican National Convention. At the convention, Baldasaro called for the execution of Democratic presidential candidate Hillary Clinton, accusing her of treason and saying she should be "put in the firing line and shot". Baldasaro declined to apologize for his remark and then repeated it. New Hampshire Republican Senator Kelly Ayotte responded that “This kind of rhetoric is totally irresponsible, it has no place in our society, and violence should never be encouraged against anyone.” The Secret Service investigated Baldasaro over the remarks. However, in 2019, following the remarks, Trump praised Baldasaro at a rally in Manchester, New Hampshire. Baldasaro also was named a New Hampshire co-chair of Trump's 2020 reelection campaign.

On December 5, 2018, Baldasaro was elected to a seventh term in the House. Republican caucus leader Dick Hinch has appointed Baldasaro as the Minority Floor Leader for the 2019-2020 legislative term. On November 3, 2020, he began serving in his eighth term and was appointed to be the Chair of the State-Federal Relations and Veterans Affairs Committee.

In 2022, Baldasaro introduced a measure to prevent the New Hampshire House from considering a bill that would allow homeowners to add up to four housing units on lots that were previously exclusively zoned for single-family housing.
