= Joshua Moore =

Joshua Moore may refer to:

- Joshua John Moore (1790–1864), grazier and landowner in Australia
- Joshua Moore (American football) (born 1988), American football cornerback
- Josh A. Moore (born 1980), American basketball player and actor
- Josh Moore (politician) (born 1989), member of the New Hampshire House of Representatives
- Josh Moore, a resident of Fort Gay, West Virginia#Xbox controversy.
