= Robert Theberge =

American politician

Member of the Coös County Commission from the 1st district
- Incumbent
- Assumed office 2022
- Preceded by: Paul R. Grenier

Member of the New Hampshire House of Representatives from the 3rd Coös district
- In office December 2, 2020 – December 7, 2022 Serving with Larry L. Laflamme, Eamon Kelley
- Preceded by: Doug Thomas; Bernard S. Noel
- Succeeded by: Mike Ouellet

Member of the New Hampshire House of Representatives from the 3rd Coös district
- In office December 5, 2012 – December 4, 2018 Serving with Gary Coulombe, Yvonne Thomas, Alethea Lincoln Froburg, Larry Laflamme
- Preceded by: William A. Hatch
- Succeeded by: Doug Thomas; Bernard S. Noel

Member of the New Hampshire House of Representatives from the 4th Coös district
- In office December 1, 2004 – December 5, 2012 Serving with Edgar Mears, Renney E. Morneau, Bernie Buzzell, Yvonne Thomas, Paul H. Ingersoll, Sr, Lucy Mears, Gary Coulombe, Marc D. Tremblay
- Preceded by: District established
- Succeeded by: Herbert D. Richardson

Member of the New Hampshire House of Representatives from the 3rd Coös district
- In office December 4, 2002 – December 1, 2004 Serving with Dave Woodward, Edgar Mears, Richard L. Poulin
- Preceded by: Lynn C. Horton
- Succeeded by: Bruce S. Lary

Personal details
- Born: Berlin, New Hampshire
- Party: Republican (since 2017)
- Other political affiliations: Democratic (until 2017)

Robert Theberge is an American politician. He was a member of the New Hampshire House of Representatives and represented Coos's 3rd district.

In February 2017, Theberge changed his party affiliation from Democrat to Republican.
