= Ernest H. Bridge =

American politician

Member of New Hampshire House of Representatives for Sullivan 6
- In office 2014–2016

Personal details
- Party: Republican
- Education: University of New Hampshire; Wayne State University

Ernest H. Bridge is an American politician. He was represented Sullivan 6th district in the New Hampshire House of Representatives from 2014 to 2016.
