= David Russell (New Hampshire politician) =

American politician

Member of New Hampshire House of Representatives for Belknap 5
- In office 2014–2016

Member of New Hampshire House of Representatives for Belknap 6
- In office 2000–2012

Personal details
- Born: April 29, 1936
- Party: Republican

David Russell is an American politician. He was a member of the New Hampshire House of Representatives and represented Belknap County from 2000 to 2016. Russell graduated from Proctor Academy and Colby College. .
