= Wendy Piper =

American politician

Member of New Hampshire House of Representatives for Grafton 10
- In office 2012–2016

Personal details
- Party: Democratic (until 2025)
- Other political affiliations: Republican (since 2025)
- Education: State University of New York

Wendy A. Piper is an American politician. She was a member of the New Hampshire House of Representatives and represented Grafton 10th district from 2012 to 2016. In 2025, she switched parties.
