= Andrew Christie Jr. =

American politician

Member of New Hampshire House of Representatives for Rockingham 37
- In office 2014–2016
- Preceded by: Elaine Andrews-Ahearn

Personal details
- Party: Republican
- Education: Northeastern University; University of New Hampshire

Andrew Christie Jr. is an American politician. He was a member of the New Hampshire House of Representatives and represented Rockingham 37th district from 2014 to 2016.

Christie is a retired police chief from Hampton Falls, New Hampshire.
