= Asten, Netherlands =

Asten
- Municipality
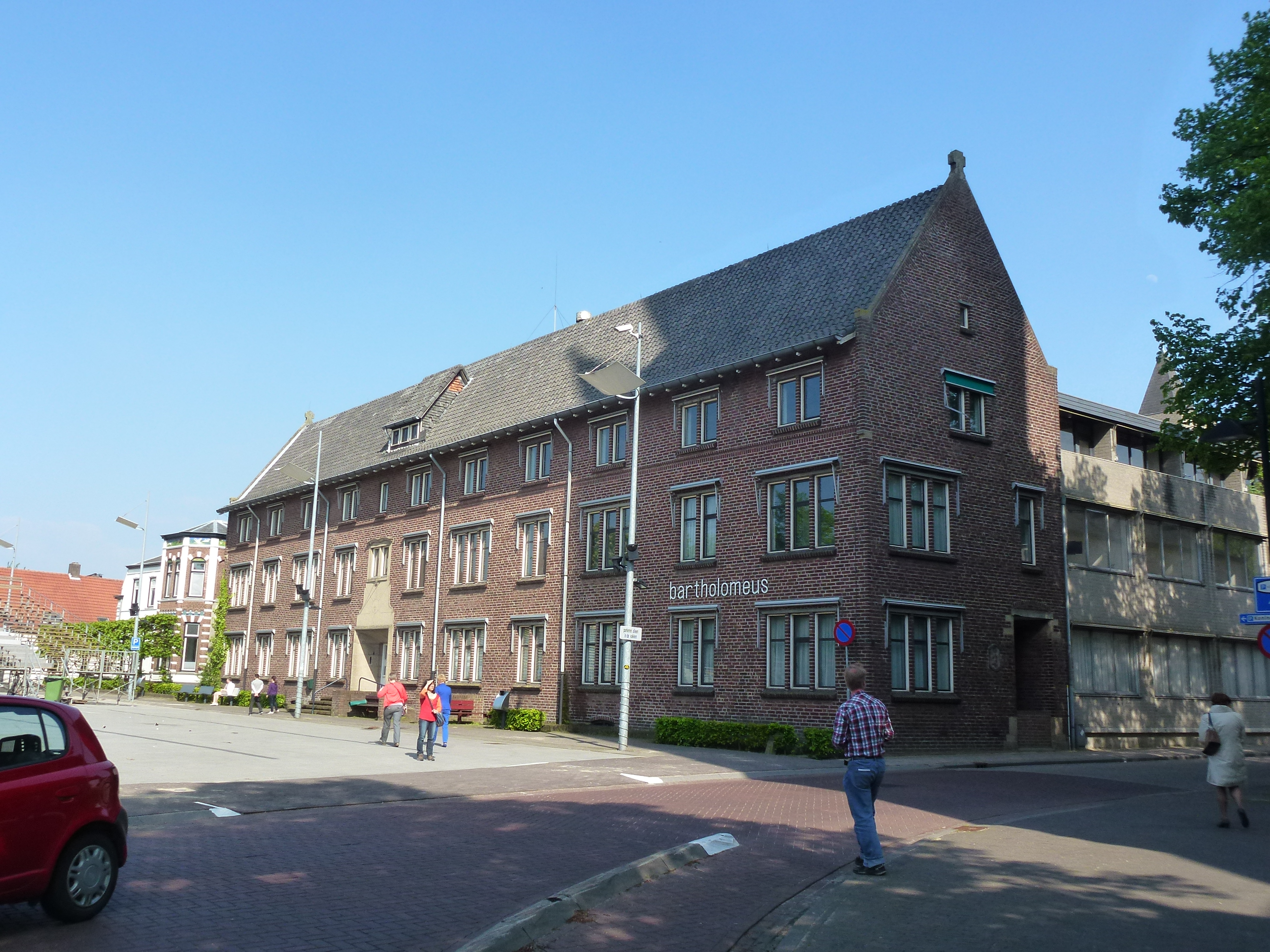
- Huize Bartholomeus, Asten

- Flag Coat of arms

- Location in North Brabant
- Coordinates: 51°24′N 5°45′E
- Country: Netherlands
- Province: North Brabant

Government
  - Body: Municipal council
  - Mayor: Anke van Extel-van Katwijk (CDA)

Area
  - Total: 71.34 km^{2} (27.54 sq mi)
  - Land: 70.17 km^{2} (27.09 sq mi)
  - Water: 1.17 km^{2} (0.45 sq mi)
- Elevation: 27 m (89 ft)

Population (January 2021)
  - Total: 16,817
  - Density: 240/km^{2} (620/sq mi)
- Demonym: Astenaar
- Time zone: UTC+1 (CET)
  - Summer (DST): UTC+2 (CEST)
- Postcode: 5720–5725
- Area code: 0493
- Website: www.asten.nl

Asten (Dutch pronunciation: [ˈɑstə(n)]) is a municipality and a town in southern Netherlands.

It is home to the Royal Eijsbouts bell foundry and also a carillon museum.

The spoken language is Peellands, an East Brabantian dialect.

== Population centres ==
- Asten
- Heusden
- Ommel

== History ==
Asten has a rich history going back to the Roman period. In the swamp of the village's national park 'De Peel' an ancient Roman centurion helmet was found. Silhouets of Hunter-Gatherer and Agricultural societies were also found in the area. The village has a castle dating back to the 12th century, at the south of the current village. It has also given its name to the village: "Aa-Stein", or "stone building on the river Aa". A second stone-built fortified building was suspected at the north, at the site of the current Slotweg ("castle road") to be precise. Some stone fragments have been excavated, although no conclusive evidence of a fortified building has been produced here. The village was pillaged and burnt twice in the 17th century, by Austrian and Swedish army troops.

== Topography ==
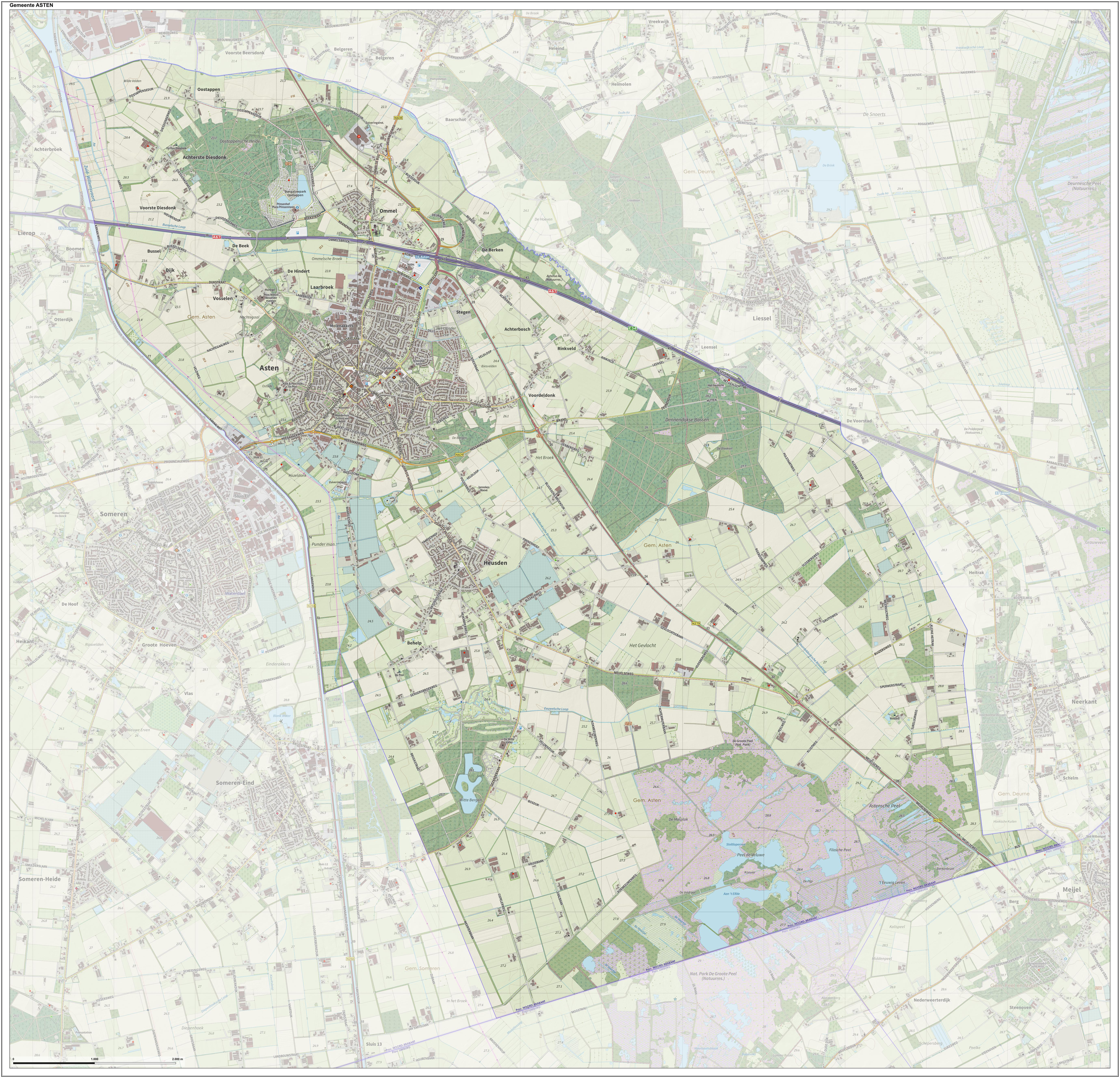
Topographic map of Asten (municipality), June 2015

== Notable residents ==
- Driekske van Bussel (1868 in Asten – 1951) an archer, gold medallist at the 1920 Summer Olympics
- Piet Raijmakers (born 1956 in Asten) a Dutch equestrian, gold medallist at the 1992 Summer Olympics
- Jan Verschuren (born 1962 in Asten) a Dutch organist
- Martin Koolhoven (born 1969) a Dutch film director and screenwriter
- Nancy Coolen (born 1973 in Asten) known as Nance, is a Dutch TV host and former singer for Twenty 4 Seven
- Bart Claessen (born 1980 in Asten) a Dutch Trance music DJ

== Gallery ==
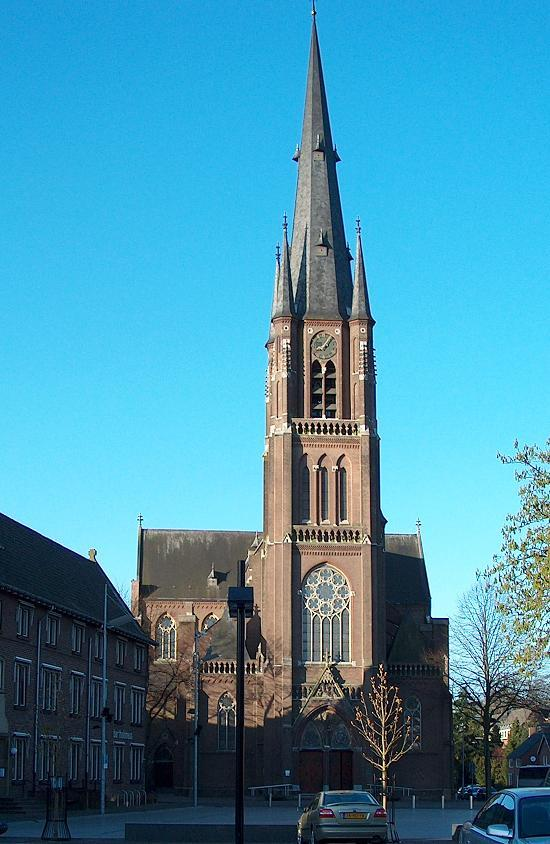
Heilige Maria Presentatiekerk

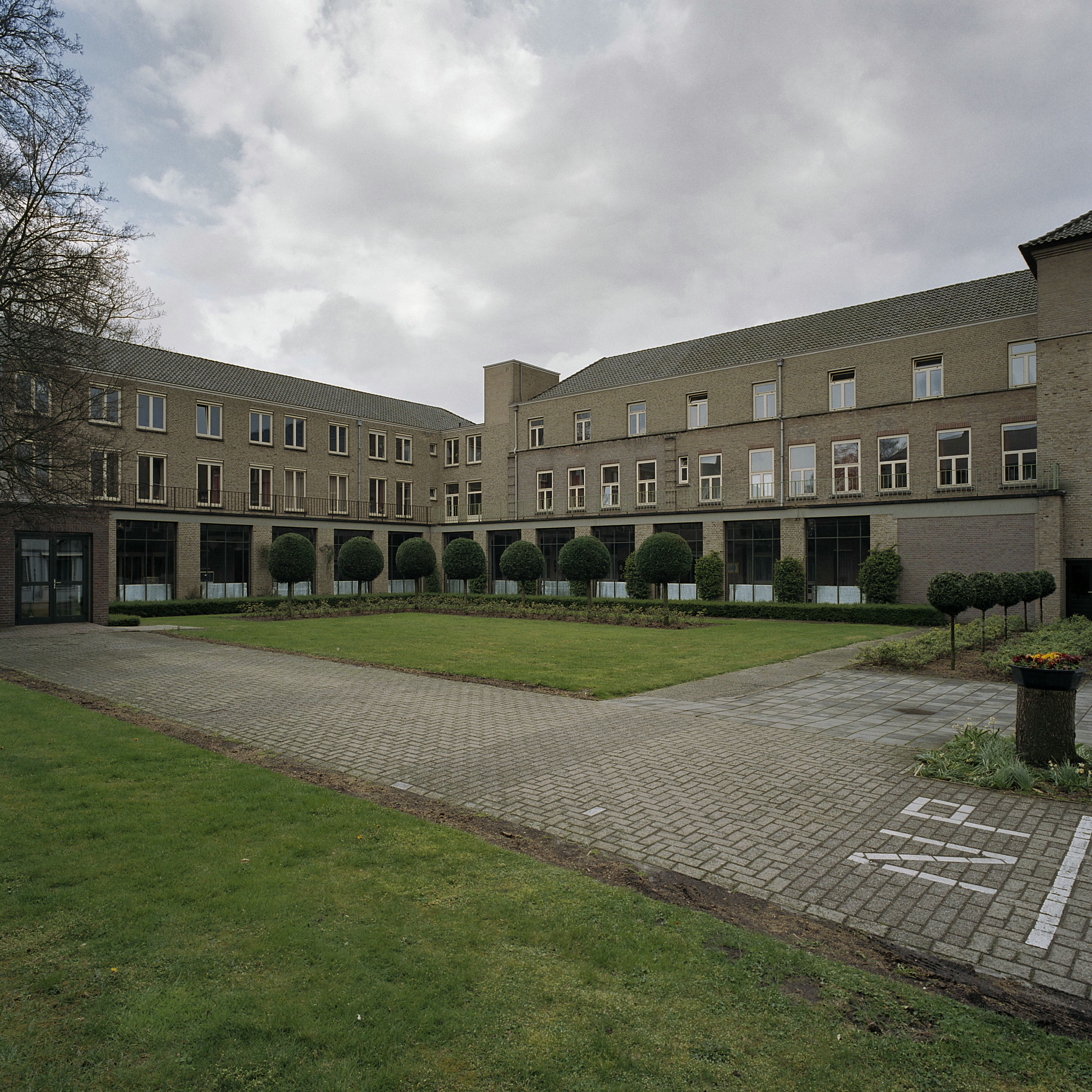
Villa En Klooster Van De Missiezusters Franciscanessen Van De He, Asten

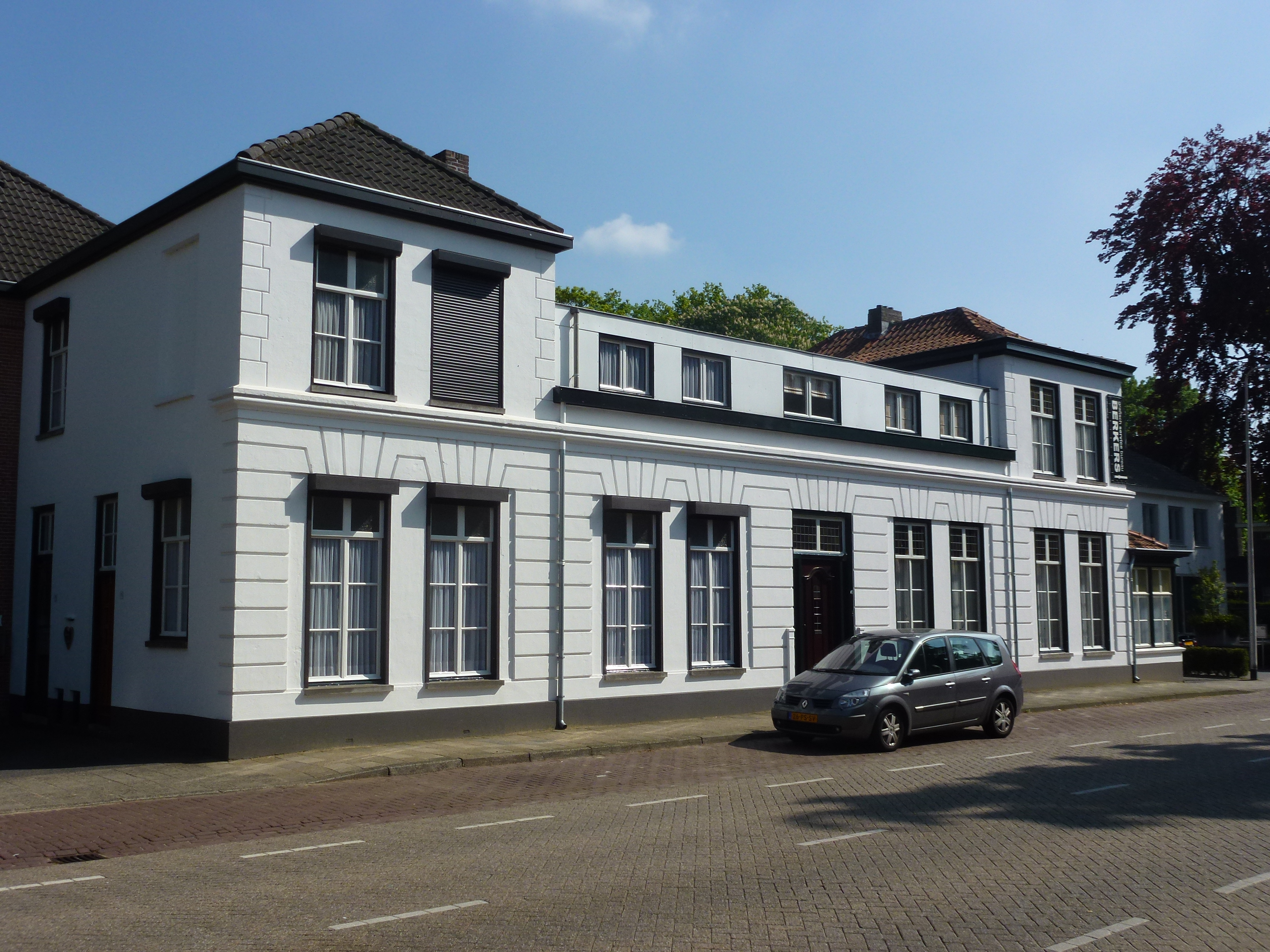
Wilhelminastraat, Asten

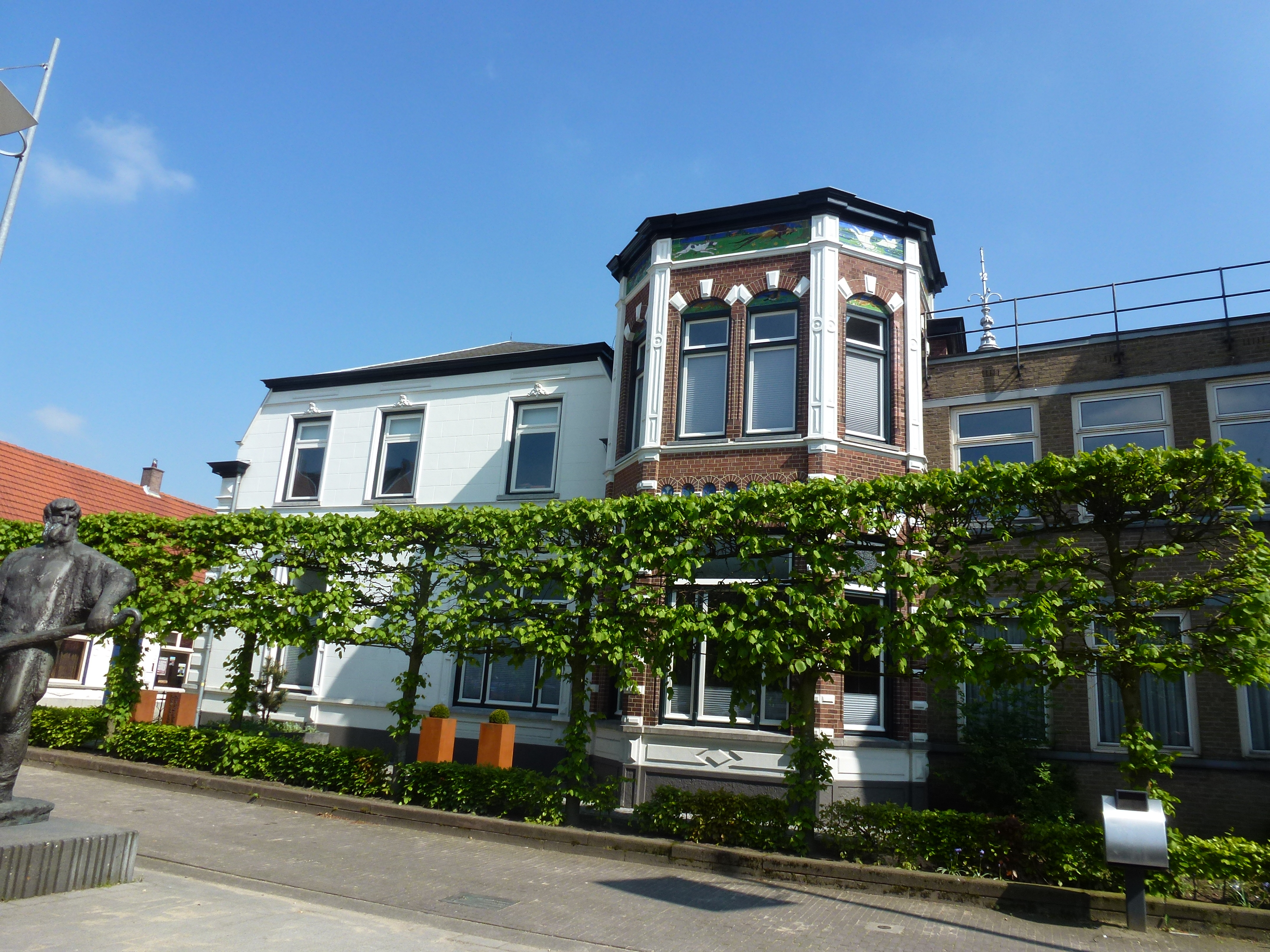
Julianastraat, Asten
