= Lee Guerette =

American politician

Member of New Hampshire House of Representatives for Hillsborough 33
- In office 2014–2016

Personal details
- Born: July 28, 1949 Nashua, New Hampshire
- Died: December 27, 2025 (aged 76) Nashua, New Hampshire
- Party: Democratic
- Education: Boston University

C. Lee Guerette (July 28, 1949 – December 27, 2025) was an American politician. She was a member of the New Hampshire House of Representatives and represented Hillsborough 33rd district from 2014 to 2016.
