= June Frazer =

American politician

Member of New Hampshire House of Representatives for Merrimack 13
- In office 2010–2016

Personal details
- Born: January 14, 1936
- Died: September 25, 2024 (aged 88)
- Party: Democratic
- Education: Stetson University; University of North Carolina at Chapel Hill

June M. Frazer (January 14, 1936 – September 25, 2024) was an American politician. She was a member of the New Hampshire House of Representatives and represented Merrimack 13th district from 2010 to 2016.
