= George Hurt =

American politician

Member of New Hampshire House of Representatives for Belknap 2
- In office 2014–2016

Personal details
- Party: Republican

George F. Hurt is an American politician. He was a member of the New Hampshire House of Representatives and represented Belknap 2nd district from 2014 to 2016.
