= Shawn Sweeney (New Hampshire politician) =

American politician

Member of New Hampshire House of Representatives for Hillsborough 23
- In office 2012 – May 18, 2016

Personal details
- Party: Republican
- Education: University of New Hampshire School of Law

Shawn P. Sweeney is an American politician. He represented Hillsborough County in the New Hampshire House of Representatives until 2016. He is an attorney.
