= Nick Zaricki =

American politician

Member of New Hampshire House of Representatives for Hillsborough 6
- In office 2014–2018

Personal details
- Party: Republican
- Education: University of New Hampshire; Northeastern University School of Law

Nicholas M. Zaricki is an American politician. He was a member of the New Hampshire House of Representatives and represented Hillsborough 6th district.

Zaricki graduated from the University of New Hampshire and Northeastern University School of Law in Boston. Zaricki endorsed the Rand Paul 2016 presidential campaign.
