= Naida Kaen =

American politician

Member of New Hampshire House of Representatives for Strafford 5
- In office 1994–2016

Personal details
- Born: May 12, 1946 (age 80)
- Party: Democratic
- Education: University of Michigan; University of New Hampshire

Naida Kaen (born May 12, 1946) is an American politician. She was a member of the New Hampshire House of Representatives and represented Strafford 5th district from 1994 to 2016.
