= Catherine Cheney =

American politician

Member of New Hampshire House of Representatives for Strafford 17
- In office 2014–2016

Personal details
- Party: Republican
- Education: University of Hartford; Keene State College
- Website: Official website

Catherine Cheney is an American politician. She was a member of the New Hampshire House of Representatives and represented Strafford 17th district from 2014 to 2016. She was previously a city councilor in Dover, New Hampshire and a Strafford County commissioner.
