= Geoffrey Hirsch =

American politician

Member of New Hampshire House of Representatives for Merrimack 6
- In office 2012–2016

Personal details
- Party: Democratic
- Education: University of Connecticut

Geoffrey Hirsch is an American politician. He represented Merrimack County on New Hampshire House of Representatives from 2012 to 2016.
