= Robert Introne =

American politician

Member of New Hampshire House of Representatives for Rockingham 5
- In office 2000–2016

Personal details
- Born: April 27, 1942 Weymouth, Massachusetts
- Died: October 11, 2021 (aged 79) Phoenix, Arizona
- Party: Republican
- Education: Pennsylvania State University; Colorado State University

Robert E. Introne Jr. (April 27, 1942 – October 11, 2021) was an American politician. He represented Rockingham County in the New Hampshire House of Representatives from 2000 to 2016.
