= Debbie DiFranco =

American politician

Member of New Hampshire House of Representatives for Rockingham 27
- In office 2014–2016

Personal details
- Died: July 10, 2016
- Party: Democratic
- Education: University of Massachusetts Amherst; University of North Florida

Debbie DiFranco (died July 10, 2016) was an American politician. She was a member of the New Hampshire House of Representatives and represented Rockingham 27th district from 2014 to 2016. DiFranco grew up in Paterson, New Jersey. DiFranco moved to the Seacoast Region of New Hampshire in 2011. She died in July 2016 from cancer.
