= Edmond Gionet =

American politician (1931–2019)

Member of New Hampshire House of Representatives for Grafton 5
- In office 2002–2016

Personal details
- Born: April 18, 1931 Lincoln, New Hampshire
- Died: July 29, 2019 (aged 88) Lincoln, New Hampshire
- Party: Republican

Edmond D. Gionet (April 18, 1931 – July 29, 2019) was an American politician. He was a member of the New Hampshire House of Representatives and represented Grafton 5th district from 2002 to 2016. Gionet was of Acadian descent. He served in the United States Armed Forces until 1954. In the New Hampshire State Legislature, he was known for his support for casinos.
