= Phil Straight =

American politician

Member of New Hampshire House of Representatives for Hillsborough 21
- In office 2012–2016

Personal details
- Born: January 5, 1946 Emerson, Iowa
- Died: October 25, 2022 (aged 76)
- Party: Republican

Phillip "Phil" N. Straight (January 5, 1946 – October 25, 2022) was an American politician. He represented Hillsborough County in the New Hampshire House of Representatives until 2016.
