= Andrew deTreville =

American politician

Member of the New Hampshire House of Representatives from the Merrimack 18th district
- In office December 2016 – February 2, 2017
- Preceded by: Paula Bradley

Personal details
- Born: Andrew N. deTreville
- Party: Democratic

Andrew N. deTreville is an American politician. A member of the Democratic Party, he served in the New Hampshire House of Representatives from 2016 to 2017.
