= Nikki McCarter =

American politician

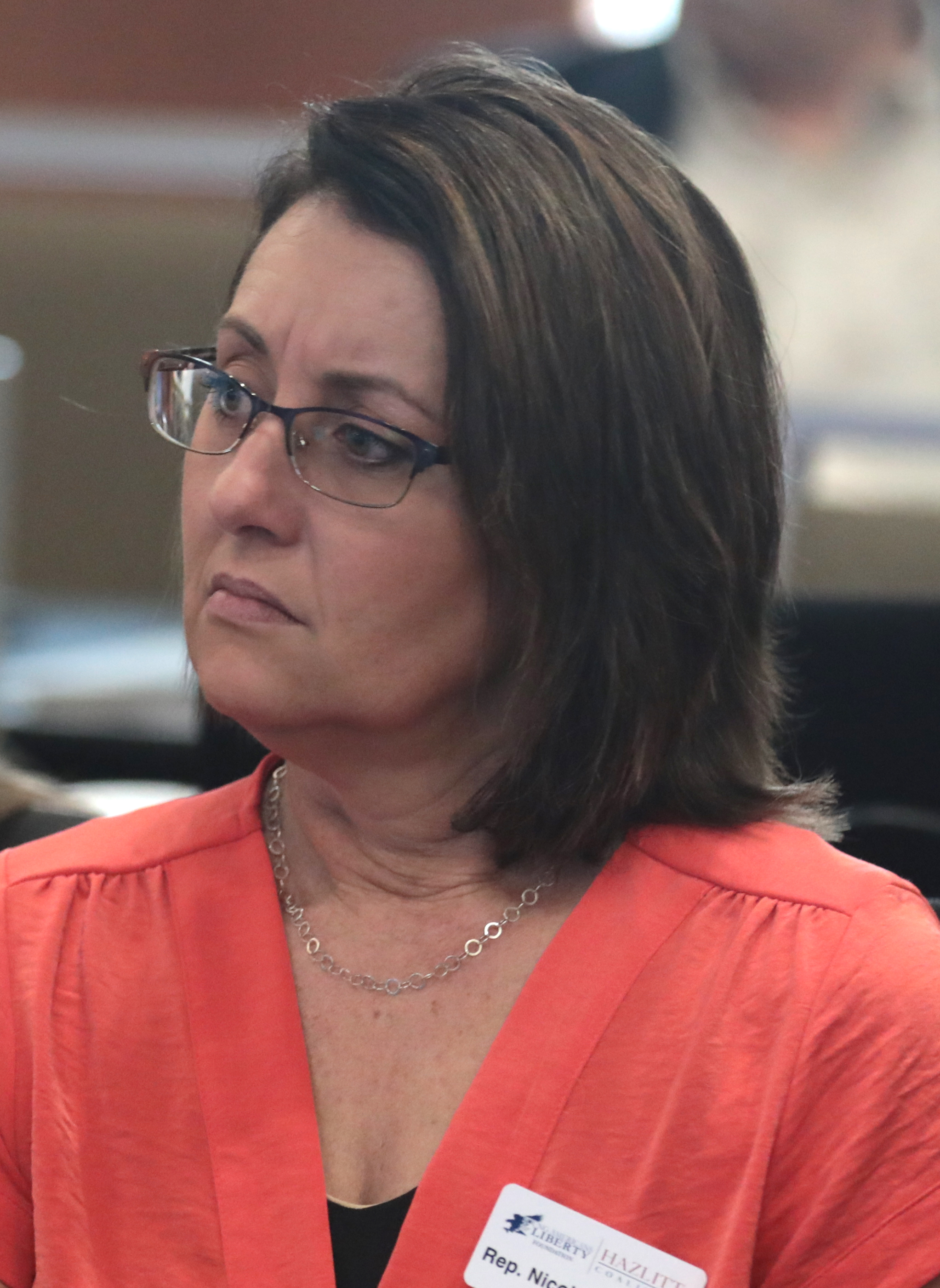

Member of the New Hampshire House of Representatives from the Belknap 8th district
- Incumbent
- Assumed office December 7, 2022
- Succeeded by: Lisa Freeman (elect)

Personal details
- Party: Republican

Nikki McCarter is an American politician. She serves as a Republican member for the Belknap 8th district of the New Hampshire House of Representatives.
