= Susan DeLemus =

American politician

Member of New Hampshire House of Representatives for Strafford 1
- Incumbent
- Assumed office December 4, 2024
- Preceded by: Mona Perreault

Personal details
- Party: Republican

Susan (Sue) DeLemus is an American politician. She is a member of the New Hampshire House of Representatives.

She is a pro-life activist after regretting an abortion she had in the 1980s. Her husband Jerry DeLemus was sentenced to 87 months in prison in 2017 after he was convicted of organizing armed patrols as part of rancher Cliven Bundy’s armed standoff with U.S. agents in Nevada in 2014.
