= Audrey Stevens =

American politician

Member of New Hampshire House of Representatives for Strafford 7
- In office 2012–2016

Personal details
- Party: Democratic

Audrey M. Stevens is an American politician. She was a member of the New Hampshire House of Representatives and represented Strafford 7th district from 2012 to 2016.
