= Heffron (surname) =

Heffron is a surname. Notable people with the surname include:

- Bob Heffron (1890–1978), Australian politician
- Brian Heffron (born 1973), wrestler and actor
- Edward Heffron (1923–2013), paratrooper
- Frank Heffron (1936–2023), American politician
- John Heffron, comic
- Mark Heffron, boxer
- Patrick Richard Heffron (1860–1927), bishop
- Richard T. Heffron (1930–2007), director
- Dennis (Denis) Heffron (1950-2020) United States Marine in Vietnam War
- Sean J. Heffron (1976-2023) Hip Hop Artist
