= Paula Bradley (American politician) =

American politician

Member of New Hampshire House of Representatives for Merrimack 18
- In office 2014–2016
- Succeeded by: Andrew deTreville

Personal details
- Born: October 11, 1924 New Haven, Connecticut
- Died: August 13, 2021 (aged 96) Concord, New Hampshire
- Party: Democratic
- Education: Hartford Seminary; Hiram College; Middlebury College

Paula Elliott Bradley (October 11, 1924 – August 13, 2021) was an American politician. She was a member of the New Hampshire House of Representatives and represented Merrimack 18th district from 2014 to 2016.
