= Adam Schroadter =

American politician

Member of New Hampshire House of Representatives for Rockingham 17
- In office 2010–2016

Personal details
- Born: Adam Robert Schroadter
- Party: Republican
- Education: University of Utah

Adam Robert Schroadter is an American politician. He represented Rockingham 17th district in the New Hampshire House of Representatives from 2010 to 2016.
