= Janice Gardner =

American politician

Member of New Hampshire House of Representatives for Strafford 15
- In office 2012–2016

Personal details
- Born: July 28, 1938 Berlin, New Hampshire
- Died: September 5, 2017 (aged 79) Dover, New Hampshire
- Party: Democratic
- Education: University of Southern Maine; University of New Hampshire

Janice Gardner (July 28, 1938 – September 5, 2017) was an American politician. She was a member of the New Hampshire House of Representatives and represented the Strafford 15th district from 2012 to 2016. She was involved in animal welfare legislation.
