= Deanna Rollo =

American politician

Member of New Hampshire House of Representatives for Strafford 18
- In office 2012–2016

Member of New Hampshire House of Representatives for Strafford 2
- In office 2006–2010

Member of New Hampshire House of Representatives for Strafford 2
- In office 2002–2004

Personal details
- Party: Democratic
- Education: Portsmouth High School

Deanna S. Rollo is an American politician. She was a member of the New Hampshire House of Representatives until 2016. She is a long-time resident of Rollinsford, New Hampshire. She is a county commissioner in Strafford County.
