= Anne Priestley =

American politician

Member of New Hampshire House of Representatives for Rockingham 8
- In office 2012–2016

Member of New Hampshire House of Representatives for Rockingham 4
- In office 1998–2010

Personal details
- Born: Anne Kiesling; August 22, 1932
- Died: April 18, 2020 (aged 87) Salem, Massachusetts
- Party: Republican

Anne Kiesling Priestley (August 22, 1932 – April 18, 2020) was an American politician. She was a member of the New Hampshire House of Representatives and represented Rockingham County from 1998 to 2010, and from 2014 to 2016.
