= Michele Peckham =

American politician

Member of New Hampshire House of Representatives for Rockingham 22
- In office 2010–2016

Personal details
- Party: Republican
- Education: California Western School of Law; Simmons College

Michele Peckham is an American politician. She was a member of the New Hampshire House of Representatives and represented Rockingham 22nd district from 2010 to 2016.
