= Eric Johnson (New Hampshire politician) =

American politician

Member of New Hampshire House of Representatives for Grafton 7
- In office 2014–2016

Personal details
- Party: Republican

Eric Johnson is an American politician. He was a member of the New Hampshire House of Representatives and represented Grafton 7th district from 2014 to 2016.
