= Donald McClarren =

American politician

Member of New Hampshire House of Representatives for Hillsborough 29
- In office 2014–2016

Member of New Hampshire House of Representatives for Hillsborough 21
- In office 2010–2012

Personal details
- Born: February 24, 1938 Galion, Ohio, U.S.
- Died: December 7, 2021 (aged 83) Nashua, New Hampshire, U.S.
- Party: Republican
- Education: University of Oklahoma; Ohio State University

Donald B. McClarren (February 24, 1938 – December 7, 2021) was an American politician. He was a member of the New Hampshire House of Representatives and represented Hillsborough County from 2010 to 2012, and 2014 to 2016. He was United States Army veteran.
