= Larry Phillips (New Hampshire politician) =

American politician

Member of New Hampshire House of Representatives for Cheshire 16
- In office 2014–2016

Member of New Hampshire House of Representatives for Cheshire 5
- In office 2012–2014

Personal details
- Party: Democratic
- Education: Ball State University

Larry Phillips is an American politician. He represented Cheshire County on New Hampshire House of Representatives until 2016.
