= Mona Perreault =

American politician

Member of New Hampshire House of Representatives for Strafford 24
- In office December 5, 2018 – December 1, 2020
- Preceded by: Brandon Phinney
- Succeeded by: Susan DeLemus

Personal details
- Party: Republican

Mona Perreault is an American politician. She was a member of the New Hampshire House of Representatives and represented Strafford's 15th district.

== Political career ==
Perreault was elected 2018 New Hampshire House of Representatives election, unseating the Republican-turned Libertarian incumbent Brandon Phinney.
