= Barbara French =

American politician (1926–2022)

Member of New Hampshire House of Representatives for Merrimack 6
- In office 2012–2016

Member of New Hampshire House of Representatives for Merrimack 5
- In office 1996–2010

Member of New Hampshire House of Representatives
- In office 1992–1994

Personal details
- Born: July 1, 1926 Norwood, Massachusetts
- Died: April 20, 2022 (aged 95) Henniker, New Hampshire
- Party: Democratic
- Education: Mount Saint Mary College
- Alma mater: Cornell University

Barbara Conner French (July 1, 1926 – April 20, 2022) was an American politician. She was a member of the New Hampshire House of Representatives and represented Merrimack County until 2016. In the New Hampshire State Legislature, she sponsored bills related to healthcare, the environment, children and families.
