= Jason Parent =

American politician

Member of New Hampshire House of Representatives for Merrimack 26
- In office 2014–2016

Personal details
- Party: Republican
- Education: Saint Anselm College

Jason R. Parent is an American politician. He was represented Merrimack County in the New Hampshire House of Representatives from 2014 to 2016.
