= Bill Goulette =

American politician

Member of New Hampshire House of Representatives for Hillsborough 23
- In office 2014–2016

Personal details
- Party: Republican

William (Bill) Goulette is an American politician. He was a member of the New Hampshire House of Representatives and represented Hillsborough 23rd district from 2014 to 2016.
