= Rebecca Brown (politician) =

American politician

Member of New Hampshire House of Representatives for Grafton 2
- In office 2012–2016

Personal details
- Party: Democratic

Rebecca A. Brown is an American politician. She was a member of the New Hampshire House of Representatives and represented Grafton 2nd district from 2012 to 2016.
