= Warren Groen =

American politician

Member of New Hampshire House of Representatives for Strafford 10
- In office 2008–2016

Personal details
- Party: Republican
- Education: Toccoa Falls College

Warren Groen is an American politician. He represented Strafford County in the New Hampshire House of Representatives from 2008 to 2016.
