= Leon Rideout (American politician) =

American politician

Member of New Hampshire House of Representatives for Coös 7
- In office 2012–2016

Personal details
- Born: January 15, 1963 (age 63)
- Party: Republican

Leon Rideout (born January 15, 1963) is an American politician. He represented Coös County on New Hampshire House of Representatives from 2012 to 2016. Rideout served in the Iraq War. In 2016, a lawsuit was filed involving a ballot selfie after the state of New Hampshire appealed against a ruling last year which struck down the state’s law explicitly banning voters from taking and posting photos with or of their ballots.
