= Alan Cohen (politician) =

American politician

Member of New Hampshire House of Representatives for Hillsborough 30
- In office 2014–2016

Personal details
- Party: Democratic

Alan Cohen is an American politician. He was a member of the New Hampshire House of Representatives and represented Hillsborough 30th district from 2014 to 2016.
