= Beverly Ann Ferrante =

American politician

Member of New Hampshire House of Representatives for Rockingham 6
- In office 2008–2016

Personal details
- Party: Republican
- Education: Hesser College
- Alma mater: Boston University

Beverly Ann Ferrante is an American politician. She was a member of the New Hampshire House of Representatives and represented Rockingham 6th district from 2008 to 2016. She served as a councillor in the city of Derry, New Hampshire.
