= Len DiSesa =

American politician

Member of New Hampshire House of Representatives for Strafford 16
- In office 2014–2016

Personal details
- Party: Democratic
- Education: Granite State College; University of New Hampshire

Len DiSesa is an American politician. He represented Strafford County on New Hampshire House of Representatives from 2014 to 2016.
