= Donald Wright (New Hampshire politician) =

American politician

Member of New Hampshire House of Representatives for Carroll 8
- In office 2012–2016

Personal details
- Party: Republican

Donald "Ted" Wright is an American politician. He was a member of the New Hampshire House of Representatives and represented Carroll 8th district from 2012 to 2016. His floterial district contained Tuftonboro, Moultonborough, Brookfield, Effingham, Ossipee, Sandwich and Wakefield. Wright is a land surveyor.
