= Brian Seaworth =

American politician

Member of the New Hampshire House of Representatives from the Merrimack 7th district
- In office 2010–2012

Member of the New Hampshire House of Representatives from the Merrimack 20th district
- In office 2014 – December 7, 2022

Member of the New Hampshire House of Representatives from the Merrimack 12th district
- Incumbent
- Assumed office December 7, 2022
- Succeeded by: Kenneth Nivison (elect)

Personal details
- Party: Republican

Brian Seaworth is an American politician. He serves as a Republican member for the Merrimack 12th district of the New Hampshire House of Representatives.
