= Frederick Rice (American politician) =

American politician

Member of New Hampshire House of Representatives for Rockingham 21
- In office 2010–2016

Personal details
- Born: August 8, 1938 (age 88)
- Party: Republican
- Education: US Military Academy West Point

Frederick Colton Rice (born August 8, 1938) is an American politician. He represented Rockingham County in the New Hampshire House of Representatives from 2010 to 2016.
