= Carol Bush (New Hampshire politician) =

American politician

Member of the New Hampshire House of Representatives from the Rockingham 31st district
- In office 2014–2016

Personal details
- Party: Republican

Carol Bush is an American politician. She served as a Republican member for the Rockingham 31st district of the New Hampshire House of Representatives.
