= James Coffey =

American politician (1939–2024)

Member of the New Hampshire House of Representatives from the Hillsborough 3rd district
- In office 2010–2012

Member of the New Hampshire House of Representatives from the Hillsborough 25th district
- In office 2012–2016

Personal details
- Born: James Edward Coffey Jr. November 17, 1939 Plainfield, New Jersey, U.S.
- Died: December 18, 2024 (aged 85) Peterborough, New Hampshire, U.S.
- Party: Republican
- Education: Keene State College

James Edward Coffey Jr. (November 17, 1939 – December 18, 2024) was an American politician. A member of the Republican Party, he served in the New Hampshire House of Representatives from 2010 to 2016.

== Life and career ==
Coffey was born in Plainfield, New Jersey, the son of James Coffey Sr. and Emma Gehret. He attended White Plains High School, graduating in 1957. After graduating, he served with the 101st Airborne Division in the United States Army, which after his discharge, he attended Keene State College, earning his BS degree in history in 1991.

Coffey served in the New Hampshire House of Representatives from 2010 to 2016.

== Death ==
Coffey died in Peterborough, New Hampshire on December 18, 2024, at the age of 85.
