= Verschuere =

Verschuere or Verschuère is a surname. Notable people with the surname include:

- Karel Verschuere (1924–1980), Belgian comics artist
- Mathieu Verschuère (born 1972), French footballer
- Pol Verschuere (born 1955), Belgian cyclist
