= Pam Brown (New Hampshire politician) =

American politician

Member of New Hampshire House of Representatives for Rockingham 14
- Incumbent
- Assumed office December 4, 2024
- Succeeded by: Paul Paone (elect)

Personal details
- Party: Republican
- Education: University of Rhode Island
- Website: pam4liberty.com

Pam Brown is an American politician. She is a member of the New Hampshire House of Representatives.
