= Chris Brown (New Hampshire politician) =

American politician

Member of the New Hampshire House of Representatives from the Grafton 12th district
- In office 2014–2016

Personal details
- Party: Democratic

Chris Brown is an American politician. A member of the Democratic Party, he served in the New Hampshire House of Representatives from 2014 to 2016.
