= Verschuur =

Verschuur is a Dutch toponymic surname. The name is a contraction of van der schuur, meaning "from the barn". Some variant forms are Verschueren, Verschuren and Verschuuren. Notable people with the surname include:

- Gerrit Verschuur (born 1937), American astronomer
- Mike Verschuur (born 1987), Dutch racing driver
- Paulus Verschuur (1606–1667), Dutch mayor of Rotterdam portrayed by Frans Hals
- Timotheus Josephus Verschuur (1886–1945), Dutch politician
- Wouterus Verschuur (1812–1874), Dutch painter
