= Helen Deloge =

American politician

Member of New Hampshire House of Representatives for Merrimack 16
- In office 2014–2016

Member of New Hampshire House of Representatives for Merrimack 12
- In office 2010–2012

Personal details
- Party: Democratic
- Education: Fitchburg State College
- Alma mater: Boston University

Helen Deloge is an American politician. She was a member of the New Hampshire House of Representatives until 2016.
