= Ken Peterson (New Hampshire politician) =

American politician

Member of New Hampshire House of Representatives for Hillsborough 7
- In office 2014–2016

Personal details
- Party: Republican
- Education: Pennsylvania State University; National Defense University

Ken Peterson is an American politician. He represented Hillsborough County in the New Hampshire House of Representatives until 2016.
