= Jan Verschuren =

Dutch organist

Jan Verschuren (born 1962 in Asten, Netherlands) is a Dutch organist.

== Biography ==
Verschuren studied to become an engineer at the Eindhoven University of Technology and at the same time he practiced the organ with Hub. Houët in Eindhoven, the Netherlands. He continued practicing the organ under the instruction of Reitze Smits at the Lemmensinstituut in Leuven, Belgium and completed it with a Premier Prix/first prize. Further more Verschuren continued under the instruction of Reitze Smits for the degree of Master of Music at the Utrechts Conservatorium, the Netherlands.

Additionally he took advanced interpretation courses with Jan-Willem Jansen at the Conservatoire of Toulouse and with Michel Bouvard at the Conservatoire of Paris.

Verschuren was appointed organist in Mill and Boxmeer, the Netherlands. In 1998 he has been appointed as university organist of the University Leiden, the Netherlands. In 2001, Verschuren succeeded Folkert Grondsma as titular-organist of the Hartebrug Church in Leiden. Moreover in 2006 Jan Verschuren has been appointed as university-organist of the Eindhoven University of Technology in Eindhoven.

Organ-recitals took him to many organs in the Netherlands, Austria, Belgium, Germany, France, Hungary, Italy, the Czech Republic and Poland. Moreover, Verschuren has made CD-recordings and performed on the Dutch radio.

At the end of 2002, as university organist, Verschuren was invited to perform the world premiere of Le loup en pierre by Clarence Barlow, an organ piece for two organs, in the Pieterskerk, Leiden.

== Awards ==
In April 2002, Verschuren was awarded the medaille d’argent/silver medal of the Société Académique des Arts-Sciences-Lettres de Paris in appreciation of propagating French organ music.
