= Alethea Lincoln Froburg =

American politician

Member of New Hampshire House of Representatives for Coos 3
- In office 2014–2016

Personal details
- Party: Democratic

Alethea Lincoln Froburg is an American politician. She was a member of the New Hampshire House of Representatives and represented Coos 3rd district from 2014 to 2016. Her husband Arthur A. Froburg (1939–2011) was a competitive cyclist.
