= Elaine Andrews-Ahearn =

American politician

Member of New Hampshire House of Representatives for Rockingham 37
- In office 2012–2014
- Succeeded by: Andrew Christie Jr.

Personal details
- Party: Democratic

Elaine Andrews-Ahearn is an American politician. She was a member of the New Hampshire House of Representatives and represented Rockingham 37th district from 2012 to 2014. In 2014, she was unseated by Andrew Christie Jr. a Republican.
