= Jim Parison =

American politician

Member of New Hampshire House of Representatives for Hillsborough 25
- In office 2010–2016

Personal details
- Born: June 29, 1955 (age 71)
- Party: Republican
- Education: University of New Hampshire

James A. "Jim" Parison (born June 29, 1955) is an American politician. He represented Hillsborough County on New Hampshire House of Representatives from 2010 to 2016.
