= Delogenes =

Scientific classification
- Kingdom: Animalia
- Phylum: Arthropoda
- Class: Insecta
- Order: Lepidoptera
- Family: Pyralidae
- Subfamily: Phycitinae
- Genus: Delogenes; Meyrick, 1918
- Species: D. limodoxa

Binomial name
- Delogenes limodoxa Meyrick, 1918

Genus of moths

Delogenes is a monotypic snout moth genus. Its only species, Delogenes limodoxa, is found in New Zealand. Both the genus and species were described by Edward Meyrick in 1918.

The wingspan is about 24 mm. The forewings are elongate triangular and very narrow at the base. They are fuscous, finely and suffusedly irrorated (sprinkled) with white. The lines are dark brown sprinkled with blackish. The hindwings are light grey.
