= Guy Comtois =

American politician (1961–2025)

Member of New Hampshire House of Representatives for Belknap 7
- In office 2010–2016
- Succeeded by: Barbara Comtois

Personal details
- Born: Guy Richard Comtois; August 26, 1961 Lowell, Massachusetts
- Died: February 25, 2025 (aged 63) Pelham, New Hampshire
- Party: Republican
- Spouse: Barbara Comtois
- Education: Pelham High School

Guy Richard Comtois (August 26, 1961 – February 25, 2025) was an American politician. He represented Belknap County in the New Hampshire House of Representatives from 2010 to 2016. Comtois was born in Lowell, Massachusetts.
