= Josh Moore (politician) =

American politician (born 1989)

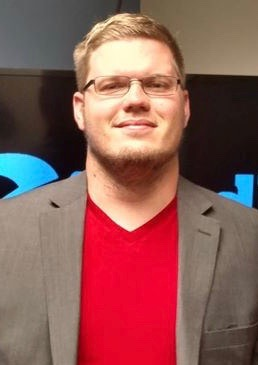
Moore in 2016

Josh Moore (born June 4, 1989) is an American former Republican politician from Merrimack, New Hampshire, serving in the New Hampshire House of Representatives from January 2015 to December 2018. He was born in Gainesville, Florida. As a state representative he represented the Hillsborough County 21st district.

== Controversy ==
In 2015, Moore sponsored a bill that would make it a misdemeanor for women to expose their nipples in the state. It is currently legal in New Hampshire for both genders to be topless in public. The proposed bill makes it a punishable crime for a woman to show her nipple, and it classifies such an act as "lewdness" and "indecent exposure." State Rep. Amanda Bouldin (D) wrote an open Facebook message to Moore, saying that he should scrap the bill or at least exempt new mothers who are breastfeeding. (The bill does have such an exemption.) In his response Moore wrote: "If it's a woman's natural inclination to pull her nipple out in public and you support that," Moore wrote, "than [sic] you should have no problem with a mans [sic] inclantion [sic] to stare at it and grab it. After all... It's ALL relative and natural, right?"

In August 2019, Josh Moore came under controversy again after hosting an event, with his organization, the Patriot Initiative, at the Nashua, New Hampshire library called, "Addressing the LGBT Agenda." In response to this event, which many have labelled as homophobic, many people in Nashua, including Mayor Jim Donchess, organized a counter-protest to the event. In response to these events, website hosting provider for the Patriot Initiative, Eleven2, suspended the Initiative's website for hate speech.
