= David Borden (politician) =

American politician

Member of the New Hampshire House of Representatives Rockingham 18th (2006–2010) Rockingham 24th (2012–2016)
- In office 2006–2010
- In office 2012–2016

Personal details
- Born: Hanover, New Hampshire, U.S.
- Party: Democratic
- Spouse: Nancy Borden
- Education: University of Colorado

David A. Borden is a Democratic former member of the New Hampshire House of Representatives who represented the Rockingham 18th district from 2006 to 2010 and the Rockingham 24th district from 2012 to 2016.

David Borden was born in New Hampshire and raised on a farm in Vermont. He attended undergraduate and graduate studies at the University of Colorado and Columbia University after serving as an infantry medic in the US Army's 10th Mountain Division.

Following graduate studies, he worked as a training officer for the Peace Corps and as a community development specialist until he and his family formed Victoria International Corporation (VIC). VIC has supervised the training for 80 hotel openings in 30 countries and has helped improve customer service in over 400 other institutions including the Harvard teaching hospitals, Dartmouth–Hitchcock Medical Center and various transportation companies. In conjunction with Singapore Airlines, VIC also designed the training courses for Singapore Service Quality Centre which has trained several hundred thousand service workers in Asia.

Borden has served on the boards of the New Hampshire Rivers Council, River Network, and Southeast Land Trust of New Hampshire and currently serves on the board of Sustainable Harvest International.

Elected to the New Hampshire State Legislature in 2006, he served as clerk on the Science, Technology and Energy Committee and as a member of the state's Energy Efficiency and Sustainable Energy Board, where he chaired a committee on reduction of energy at the municipal level. He also co-chaired an effort to improve the legislative rule-making process. Additionally, he was appointed to the New Hampshire Storm Water Commission and the Agriculture and Energy Committee of the National Conference of State legislators by House Speaker Terie Norelli.

He served as chair of the New Hampshire State Biodiesel Commission until it was eliminated as part of his effort to create a leaner state government. David is working as a volunteer in an effort to improve customer service and reduce bureaucracy in the legislative and executive branches of the New Hampshire state government.

In his hometown of New Castle, where he lives with his Nancy, he serves on several municipal committees.
