= Bill Baber =

American politician

Member of the New Hampshire House of Representatives from the Strafford 14th district
- In office 2012–2016
- Preceded by: District re-established
- Succeeded by: Hamilton R. Krans Jr.

Personal details
- Born: William Baber
- Party: Democratic
- Education: Southern Illinois University; Boston University

William Baber is an American politician. A member of the Democratic Party, he served in the New Hampshire House of Representatives from 2012 to 2016.
