= Frank Heffron =

American politician

Member of New Hampshire House of Representatives for Rockingham 18
- In office 2012–2016

Personal details
- Born: October 16, 1936 Middletown, New York
- Died: November 15, 2023 (aged 87) Exeter, New Hampshire
- Party: Democratic
- Education: Middlebury College
- Alma mater: Columbia Law School

Frank H. Heffron (October 16, 1936 – November 15, 2023) was an American politician. He represented Rockingham County on New Hampshire House of Representatives from 2012 to 2016. He served as a Captain in the United States Army and worked for the NAACP as an attorney.
