= Barbara Comtois =

American politician

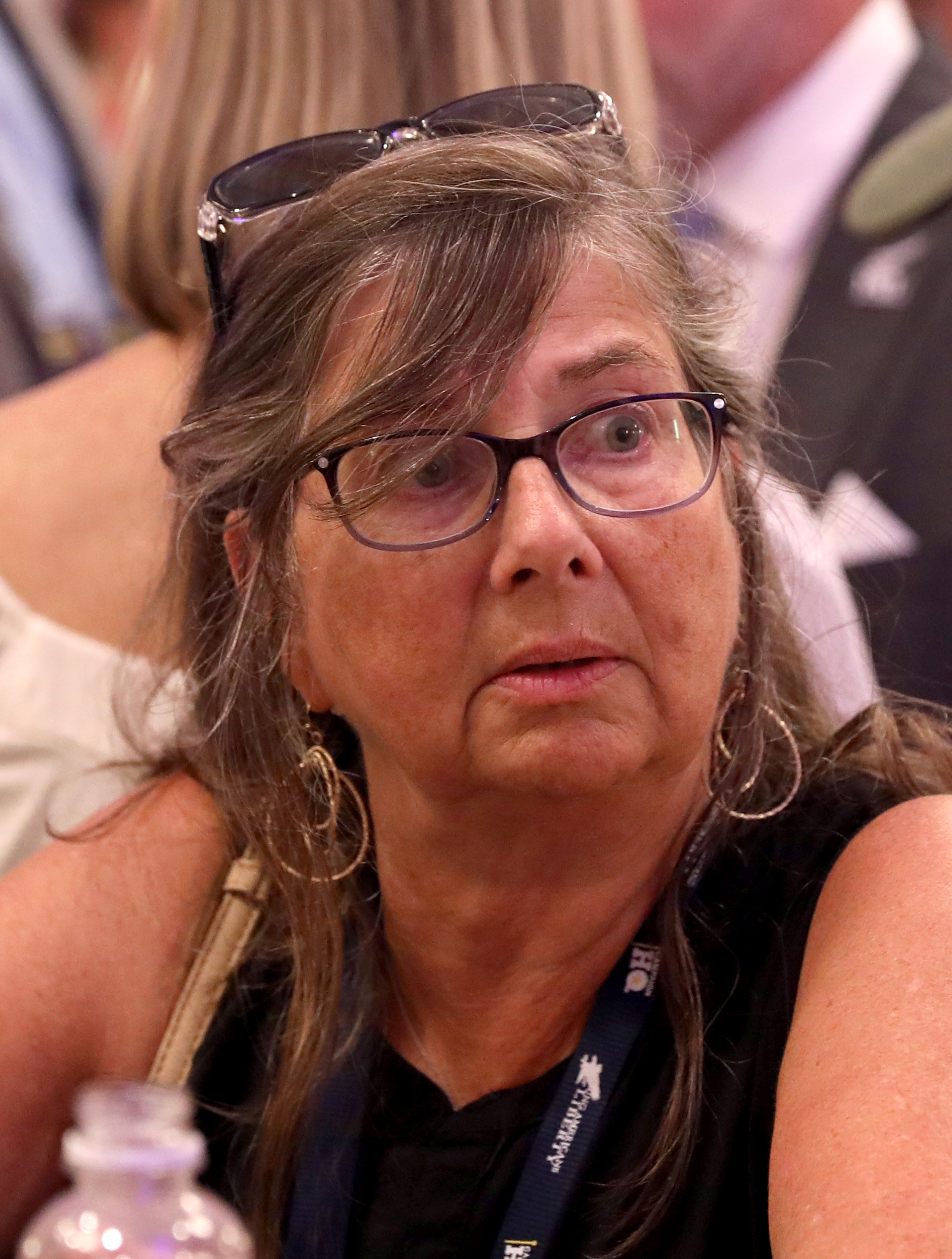
- Comtois in 2023

Member of the New Hampshire House of Representatives from the Belknap 7th district
- Incumbent
- Assumed office December 7, 2016
- Preceded by: Guy Comtois

Personal details
- Party: Republican
- Spouse: Guy Comtois (died. 2025)

Barbara Comtois is an American politician. She serves as a Republican member for the Belknap 7th district of the New Hampshire House of Representatives.
