= Daniel Hansberry =

American politician

Member of New Hampshire House of Representatives for Hillsborough 35
- In office 2012–2016

Personal details
- Party: Democratic
- Education: Keene State College; Rivier College

Daniel C. Hansberry is an American politician. He was a member of the New Hampshire House of Representatives and represented Hillsborough 35th district from 2012 to 2016.
