= James Verschueren =

American politician

Member of New Hampshire House of Representatives for Strafford 13
- In office 2012–2016

Personal details
- Party: Democratic
- Education: Tufts University

James Verschueren is an American politician. He represented Strafford County in the New Hampshire House of Representatives from 2012 to 2016. He graduated from Tufts University.
