= Christopher R. Adams =

American politician

Member of New Hampshire House of Representatives for Hillsborough 26
- In office 2014–2016

Personal details
- Party: Republican
- Education: Southern Connecticut State University

Christopher R. Adams is an American politician. He was a member of the New Hampshire House of Representatives and represented Hillsborough 26th district from 2014 to 2016.
