= Andrew Bouldin =

American politician

Member of the New Hampshire House of Representatives from the Hillsborough 12th district
- In office December 5, 2018 – August 10, 2022

Personal details
- Party: Democratic
- Education: Oyster River High School; New Hampshire Community Technical College

Andrew Bouldin was a New Hampshire politician who served in the New Hampshire House of Representatives.

== Education ==
Bouldin graduated from Oyster River High School and New Hampshire Community Technical College.

== Professional career ==
On November 6, 2018, Bouldin was elected to the New Hampshire House of Representatives where he represented the Hillsborough 12 district. Bouldin assumed office on December 5, 2018. Bouldin is a Democrat. Bouldin endorsed Bernie Sanders in the 2020 Democratic Party presidential primaries.

In 2022, Andrew Bouldin resigned his seat in the State House, after already appearing on the ballot in the General Election. According to an article in the NH Journal, it was disclosed that Andrew Bouldin, was the subject of a 2023 investigation by Manchester Police for allegedly grooming an underage female. The NH Journal reported that according to a City of Manchester Police report, "The girl told investigators Bouldin gave her alcohol, showed her pornography, asked her about her sexual preferences, and asked her if she masturbated. During one conversation, Bouldin reportedly told the girl he wanted to get a sex change to experience 'being a female,' " however, he was not charged when police concluded much of his inappropriate behavior fell outside the statute of limitations or occurred outside New Hampshire, as he was discovered to have never asked the girl to engage in any sexual activity with him, and there are no witnesses to him serving her alcohol or talking to her about sex, according to the report.

== Personal life ==
Bouldin resides in Manchester, New Hampshire.
