= Theodoros Rokas =

American politician

Theodore Rokas

Member of the New Hampshire House of Representatives from the Hillsborough 12th district
- In office 2008–2016

Personal details
- Party: Democratic

Theodore Rokas is an American politician. A member of the Democratic Party, he served in the New Hampshire House of Representatives from 2008 to 2016.
