= Amanda Bouldin =

American politician (born 1984)

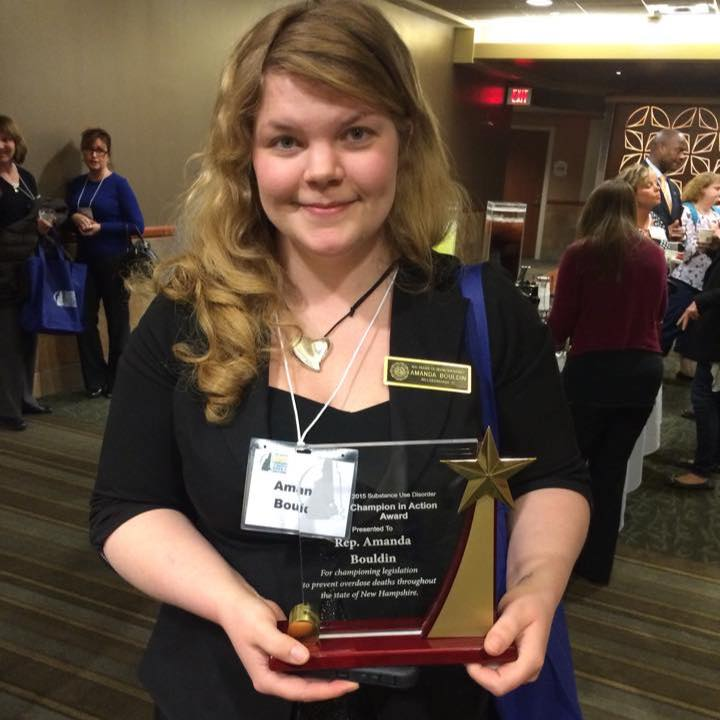
- Amanda Bouldin in 2015

Member of the New Hampshire House of Representatives from the Hillsborough 25th district
- In office December 2014 – December 2024
- Preceded by: Tim O’Flaherty

Personal details
- Party: Democratic
- Spouse: Andrew Bouldin 2016-2024

Amanda Bouldin (born December 27, 1984) is an American politician from Manchester, New Hampshire who served in the New Hampshire House of Representatives from January 2015 until December 2024. Bouldin, a Democrat, represented Hillsborough County's 25th district.

== Career ==
=== Politics ===
When she was first elected to the New Hampshire House of Representatives in 2014, Bouldin was affiliated with the libertarian Free State Project. According to Bouldin, she left the movement in 2016, later denouncing it publicly as a "cult" in 2025.

As a freshman representative, Bouldin introduced two bills addressing heroin use in New Hampshire. HB 270 provided legal protection against arrest and prosecution for individuals calling for medical assistance for someone with an opiate-related medical problem. HB 271 relaxed restrictions on prescribing naloxone, granting authorized health care professionals the power to write a prescription for anyone at risk of an opiate overdose or for a person who knows someone at risk of an opiate overdose.

In December 2015, Bouldin commented on Facebook that a proposed change in New Hampshire's public nudity law that would have allowed men to expose their nipples in public while prohibiting women from exposing their breasts while not breastfeeding was sexist. The comment drew crude comments from two Republican representatives, Josh Moore and Al Baldasaro.

In 2023, Bouldin assumed the role of New Hampshire Organizing and Recruitment Associate at Run for Something.

Amanda Boudin did not file for re-election for Hillsborough District 25 in the 2024 NH Democratic Primary Election.

== Personal life ==
Amanda Bouldin was married to Andrew Bouldin (née Gregoire). Gregoire took on Bouldin's last name when they were married. In an article in the New Hampshire Union Leader, Gregoire stated that his reasons for taking on his wife's last name were due to his progressive values. In 2018, with Amanda being a two term incumbent, the Bouldin's both ran for, and won the two open State House seats in Manchester's 5th Ward (Hillsborough 12).

As of 2024, she is no longer married, and Andrew has since gone by Andrew Kennedy.
