= Laura Jones (politician) =

American politician

Member of New Hampshire House of Representatives for Strafford 24
- In office 2010–2016

Personal details
- Party: Republican
- Education: California State University, Long Beach

Laura Jones is an American politician. She was a member of the New Hampshire House of Representatives and represented Strafford 24th district from 2010 to 2016.
