= Ralph Boehm =

American politician

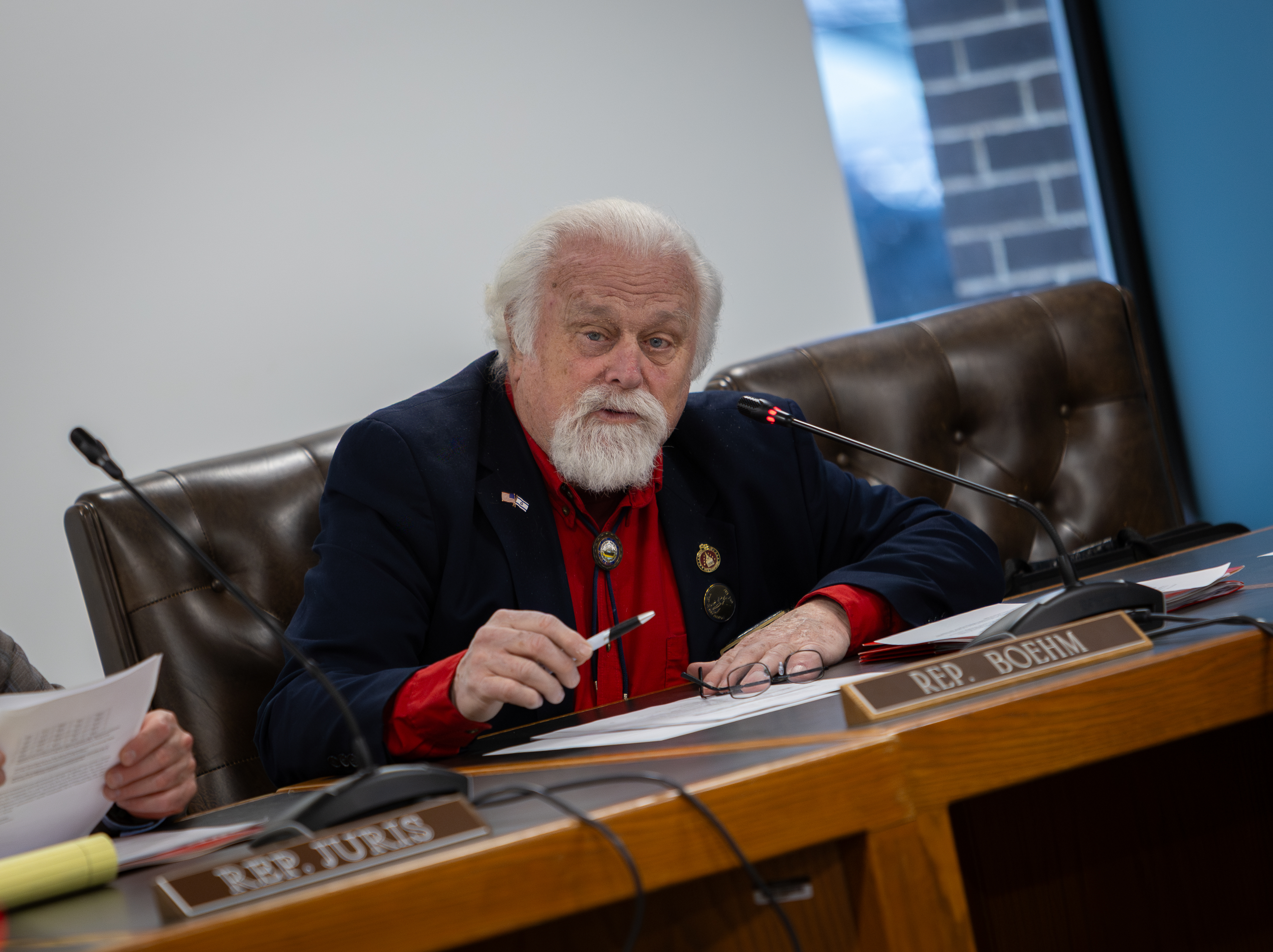
- Boehm in 2026

Member of the New Hampshire House of Representatives from the Hillsborough 27th district
- In office 2004–2006
- In office 2008–2012

Member of the New Hampshire House of Representatives from the Hillsborough 20th district
- In office 2012–2016
- In office 2018 – December 7, 2022

Member of the New Hampshire House of Representatives from the Hillsborough 14th district
- Incumbent
- Assumed office December 7, 2022

Personal details
- Party: Republican

Ralph Boehm is an American politician. He serves as a Republican member for the Hillsborough 14th district of the New Hampshire House of Representatives.

In 2022, Boehm collapsed during a speech being given by New Hampshire Governor Chris Sununu in front of the New Hampshire Legislature.
