= Jeffrey Oligny =

American politician

Member of New Hampshire House of Representatives for Rockingham 34th
- In office 2010–2016

Personal details
- Party: Republican

Jeffrey Oligny is an American politician. He was a member of the New Hampshire House of Representatives from 2010 to 2016.

Oligny endorsed the Donald Trump 2024 presidential campaign in the 2024 United States presidential election.
