= Shem Kellogg =

American politician

Member of the New Hampshire House of Representatives from the Rockingham 14th district
- In office November 2014 – June 21, 2016
- Preceded by: Jack Hayes
- Succeeded by: Peter Torosian

Personal details
- Born: Shem Vernon Kellogg; February 28, 1982 Northampton, Massachusetts, U.S.
- Died: June 21, 2016 (aged 34) Plaistow, New Hampshire, U.S.
- Party: Republican
- Education: Commonwealth College; University of Massachusetts School of Engineering

Shem Vernon Kellogg (January 28, 1982 – June 21, 2016) was an American politician. A member of the Republican Party, he served in the New Hampshire House of Representatives from 2014 to 2016.

== Life and career ==
Kellogg was born in Northampton, Massachusetts, the son of Larry and Kathleen Kellogg. He attended Amherst High School, graduating in 2000. After graduating, he attended Commonwealth College, earning his BS degree in 2002. He also attended the University of Massachusetts School of Engineering, earning his degree in 2004, which after earning his degrees, he worked as a civil engineer.

Kellogg served in the New Hampshire House of Representatives from 2014 to 2016.

== Death ==
Kellogg died on June 21, 2016, of cancer at his home in Plaistow, New Hampshire, at the age of 34.
