= Catalist =

- Formation: 2006
- Founder: Harold M. Ickes and Laura Quinn
- Founded at: United States
- Type: For-profit corporation
- Location: Washington, D.C.
- Methods: Microtargeting
- Website: catalist.us

Catalist is a for-profit corporation based in Washington, D.C., that operates a voter database and works for progressive causes.

== History ==
Catalist was founded as Data Warehouse, LLC.

The founding team of Catalist included Harold M. Ickes, Laura Quinn, and Vijay Ravindran.

During the 2008 U.S. presidential campaign, Catalist served as the principal repository of Democratic data, working with over 90 liberal groups including the Service Employees International Union, the Democratic National Committee, and the 2008 Barack Obama presidential campaign.

Catalist has engaged in data mining on behalf of clients such as Rock the Vote and EMILY's List. Catalist receives funding from the Democracy Alliance.

In 2015, Catalist received $725,000 from the National Education Association, a major teachers union.

In August 2016, Catalist analyzed records from 10 battleground states through June and found a major influx of new voters, majority-white, were responsible for the record-breaking turnout in the Republican primaries.

The company as of 2018 claims that it has data on 240 million unique individuals in the United States, to be used by "progressive" organizations. Laura Quinn remained chief executive officer.

After the 2020 election, Catalist published an analysis of turnout and votes among various demographic groups that contributed to the Biden / Harris ticket's victory.

In June 2021, 30 workers for Catalist announced that a super majority of workers had signed union authorization cards to be represented by the Communication Workers of America through CODE-CWA, and that Catalist had voluntarily recognized the workers' union. Workers said they did not organize in response to any perceived mistreatment, but rather their belief in the benefits of organizing, to "have a seat at the table" for workplace decisions, and to be in a union as part of their work with labor organizations.

== See also ==
- Blue State Digital
- Civis Analytics
- Data dredging
- Dan Wagner (data scientist)
- The Groundwork
- Harper Reed
- Left-wing politics
- Michael Slaby
- ORCA (computer system)
- Project Houdini
- Project Narwhal
- Predictive analytics
