= ORCA (computer system) =

Software used by US Republican Party in 2012 election campaign

ORCA was a mobile-optimized web application used as a component of the "get out the vote" (GOTV) efforts for Mitt Romney's 2012 presidential campaign. It was intended to enable volunteers in polling stations around the country to report which voters had turned out, so that "missing" Republican voters and underperforming precincts could be targeted for last-minute efforts to get voters to the polls. According to Romney himself, it would provide an "unprecedented advantage" to the campaign to "ensure that every last supporter makes it to the polls."

The system had major technical problems during Election Day that prevented many volunteers from using it. It crashed periodically and at one point was intentionally taken down when a surge of traffic from campaign volunteers was misinterpreted as a denial of service attack. Frustrated volunteers reported being unable to access ORCA and criticised a lack of prior briefing, misleading instructions and patchy on-the-day support. A Romney aide commented that "Orca is lying on the beach with a harpoon in it." The system's failings have been attributed by technology writers to a combination of factors including not doing prior quality assurance or beta testing, inadequate documentation and poor design.

The Romney campaign subsequently defended ORCA as a success, though campaign officials admitted that the system "had its challenges". Conservative activists and writers blamed ORCA for depressing Republican turnout on election day. While political scientists have rebutted these claims, suggesting that it probably did not have a decisive effect on the outcome, it may have negatively affected turnout figures. ORCA has been compared unfavorably with a "get out the vote" and data effort from President Obama, including Project Narwhal, seen as more robust.

== Intended purpose ==
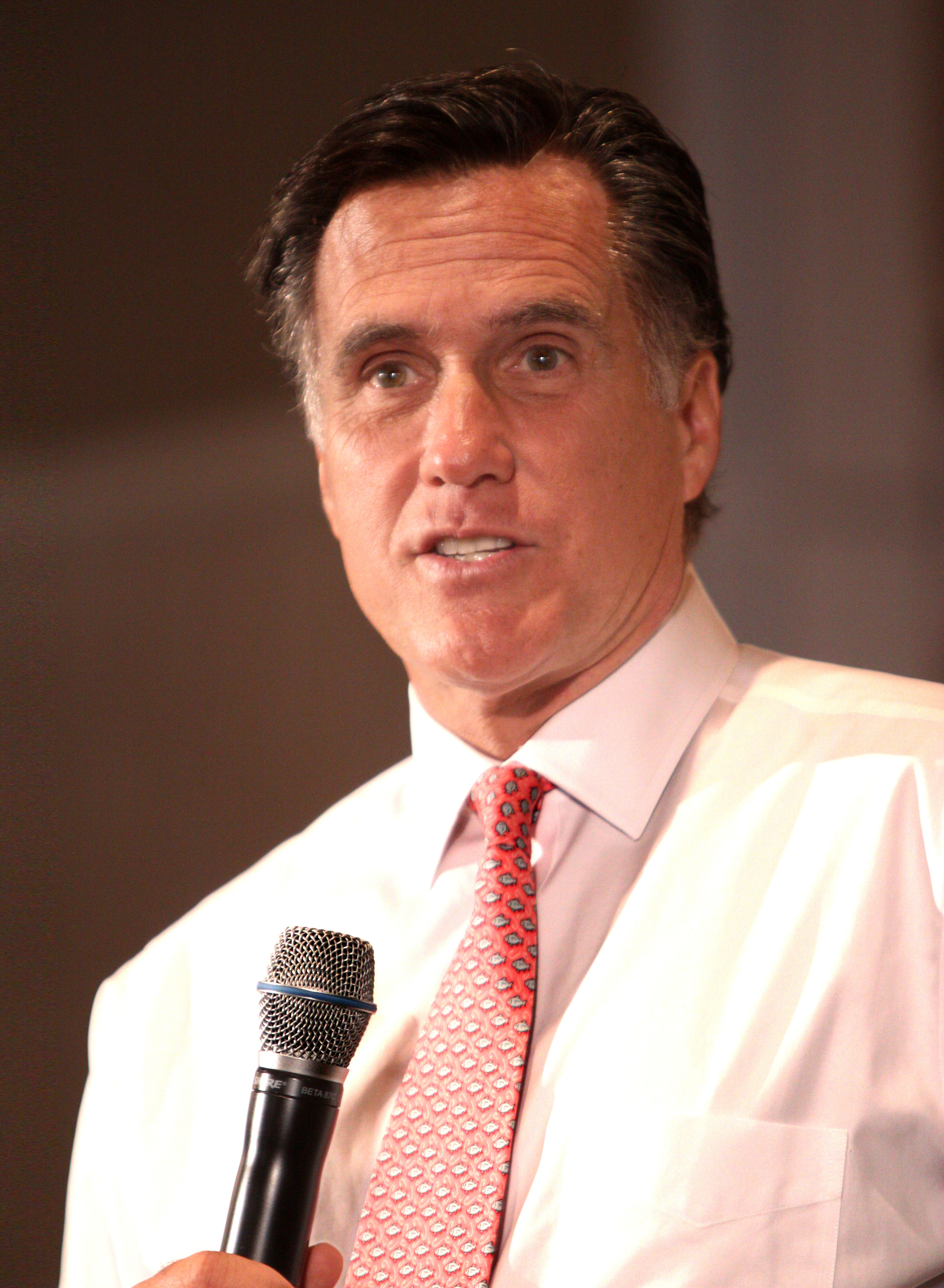
Mitt Romney on ORCA: "With state-of-the-art technology, and an extremely dedicated group of volunteers, our campaign will have an unprecedented advantage on Election Day."

Annotated illustration of the ORCA web application running on an iPhone

In the 2008 US presidential election, the Obama campaign utilized a system called Houdini to enable volunteers to report voting data to a national hotline. While this system encountered problems, the 2012 Romney campaign's ORCA system aimed to go further by enabling volunteers to report such data to campaign headquarters in real time via their smartphones. It was intended to be rolled out to around 37,000 volunteers at polling places in swing states.

Gail Gitcho, the Romney campaign's communications director, told PBS on November 5 that with the deployment of ORCA on election day, the campaign would be able to tell who had voted in which precincts. She described the system's key function as not being to predict the outcome, but to identify low turnouts in target precincts so that the campaign could take action by contacting missing voters and urging them to go to the polls. Gitcho commented: "The Obama campaign likes to brag about their ground operation, but it's nothing compared to this." The name ORCA was chosen to reference the Obama GOTV system, called Project Narwhal; in nature, the orca or killer whale is the only known non-human predator of narwhals.

In a training call for Republican volunteers on October 31, they were told: "There's nothing that the Obama data team, there's nothing that the Obama campaign, there's nothing that President Obama himself can do to even come close to what we are putting together here." According to reports, "The governor [Romney] loves seeing data, he loves seeing numbers and he's a very strategic person; he's a very smart man. So he actually loves being inside these war rooms, seeing the data come in and seeing exactly what's going on out there, so we can all put our heads together and say, 'Okay, we need to move resources here. We need to shift resources from here.'" The campaign's spokeswoman Andrea Saul told the Huffington Post that ORCA would provide Romney with "an enormous advantage ... By knowing the current results of a state, we can continue to adjust and micro target our get-out-the-vote efforts to ensure a Romney victory."

According to the campaign, ORCA would identify how between 18 and 23 million people had voted on election day, providing "the most accurate ballot projections ever" and ensuring "hyper-accuracy of our supporter targeting as we work to turn them out to the polls." In a pre-election video, Romney told volunteers: "As part of this task force, you'll be the key link in providing critical, real-time information to me and to the staff so that we can ensure that every last supporter makes it to the polls. With state-of-the-art technology, and an extremely dedicated group of volunteers, our campaign will have an unprecedented advantage on Election Day."

The Obama campaign declined to comment on ORCA but Scott Goodstein, the external online director for the 2008 Obama campaign, questioned whether it would actually make much difference to potential voters who were sitting out the election. He commented, "In a national campaign, what additional things are the headquarters really going to do to move resources? Will an additional auto-call last minute really make a difference in a market like Northeast Ohio, which has been saturated for three months full of auto-calls?" Some pro-Democrat bloggers expressed concerns that the system would facilitate voter suppression but the ORCA training material emphasized that Romney volunteers should under no circumstances talk to or confront voters.

== Development ==
The system was initially reported to have been developed by an application consulting firm and Microsoft, but later reports attributed its development to "an internal 'skunkworks'" comprising "a makeshift team of IT people and volunteers", rather than an outside consultancy, while a number of small consulting companies helped with the implementation of ORCA during election day. According to campaign insiders, it was kept secret among "a close circle in Boston" and state officials were not informed of how it would operate until only a few days before the election. Volunteer users of ORCA in Boston were given no hands-on training until the day of the election itself, when the system was turned on at 6 am.

ORCA was conceived by Rich Beeson, the campaign's political director, and Dan Centinello, Romney's director of voter contact. Centinello served as the political manager of the Orca project.

ORCA spending represented only a small portion of the campaign's overall investment in information technology.

== Features and functionality ==
ORCA was designed to work on a variety of devices, including iPhones and iPads, Android phones and tablets and BlackBerry phones.

The system was designed to show the names and addresses of every eligible voter in a particular precinct. When the voter had gone through the polling station, a logged-in volunteer would simply slide a bar on their phone screen to note that fact. If there were any problems in the polling station, such as erroneous voting lists, illegal activities or issues with the voting machines, they could press an on-screen yellow button to send an alert to the campaign's lawyers. A Twitter-style instant messenger system would also enable volunteers and the campaign to share information in real time. Those without smartphones were also catered for; the Romney campaign would provide a list of voters to enable volunteers to check off individual names and phone the information into the campaign's headquarters. The data they gathered would be monitored by 800 volunteers at campaign headquarters on the floor of TD Garden in Boston via a Web-based application; it would be used to coordinate contacts throughout election day to pro-Romney voters who had not shown up at the polls. As a fallback, a voice response system would also be established, to allow mobile phone users to call in information if the online system was not working. The voice response system was brought in the night before the election, setup on the floor of TD Garden, and went live on election day.

ORCA consisted of 11 back-end database servers and a single web server and application server providing the front end. The servers were said to have all been hosted in Boston.

== Usage ==
Throughout election day, volunteers experienced frequent and widespread problems using ORCA, which crashed periodically. As volunteers tried to log in, the surge of traffic caused the system to collapse altogether for about an hour and a half, leading to scenes of panic among Romney staffers at the TD Garden. The Romney campaign's digital director, Zac Moffatt, conceded: "The Garden definitely kind of buckled under the strain. The system wasn't ready for the amount of information incoming." The traffic surge was so great that at one point Comcast, the campaign's Internet Service Provider, shut off its network connection in the belief that it was coming under a denial of service attack. Reporter Erin McPike tweeted that some suspected that the system had been hacked and that Republican sources had confirmed to her that something had gone wrong. One Romney aide commented that "ORCA is lying on the beach with a harpoon in it."

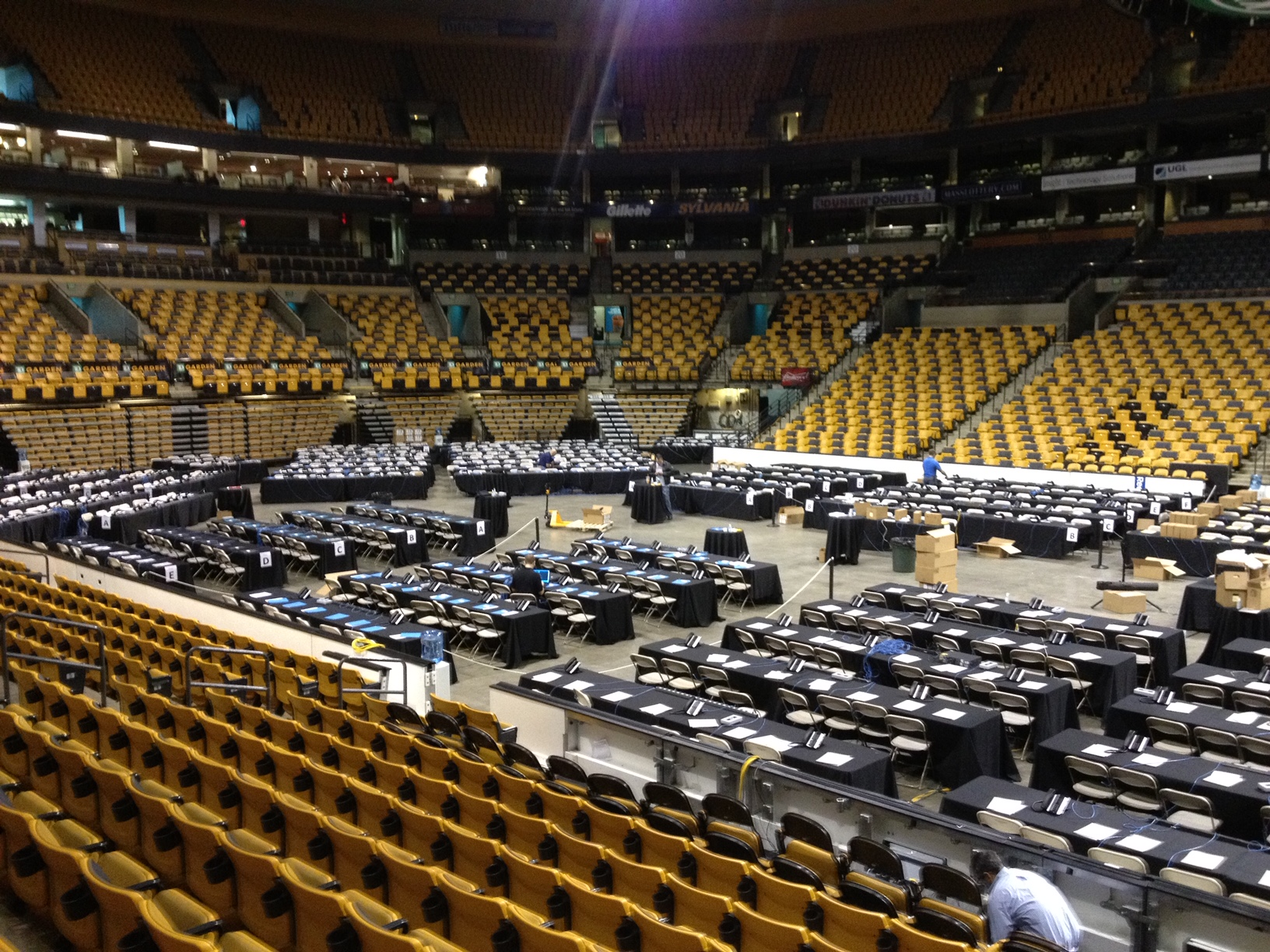
The floor of TD Garden in Boston, before the Romney campaign volunteers tried to make ORCA work on election day

John Ekdahl Jr., a Romney volunteer and web developer in Jacksonville, Florida, wrote a widely discussed account of his experiences with ORCA. The Romney campaign had sent him a 60-page document listing voters and instructions the day before the election, which he struggled to print, but when he reached his local polling station on election day he was told that he needed a certificate to be allowed to work there. The certification was not mentioned in his documentation and his attempts to reach campaign headquarters got nowhere, causing him to give up by 2 pm. Calling ORCA "an unmitigated disaster," Ekdahl said that he was "hearing almost universal condemnation of the thing. It seemed like the basic coordination between ground ops and overall team was lacking." Ekdahl also called the training manuals vague and uninformative; ORCA was regularly described as an "app", leading to volunteers looking unsuccessfully for it on the iOS App Store and Google Play. In fact, it was a web application, a mobile-enabled website that did not require additional software to use. The training materials were also riddled with errors such as duplicate checklist items and erroneous responses to frequently asked questions. ORCA exclusively used an HTTP Secure (HTTPS) connection but its designers had apparently forgotten to redirect those attempting to use the equivalent HTTP address to the HTTPS address. Anyone who incorrectly typed in an address beginning with "www" was unable to reach the system, causing many volunteers to assume that it was down.

Other volunteers reported being unable to get through to technical support and found themselves receiving either a busy signal or a "try again later" message. One volunteer wrote on a Romney campaign message board: "I have called the ORCA helpline. It was supposed to be live at 5 a.m. ... still getting a recording. Com [sic] on Boston we can't help Mitt if you won't help us.!!!!!" Many volunteers could not get their security PINs to work. According to a campaign official in Colorado, "we were called by hundreds (or more) volunteers who couldn't use the app or the backup phone system. The usernames and passwords were wrong, but the reset password tool didn't work, and we couldn't change phone PINs. We were told the problems were limited and asked to project confidence, have people use pencil and paper, and try to submit again later. Then at 6 p.m. they admitted they had issued the wrong PINs to every volunteer in Colorado, and reissued new PINS (which also didn't work)." In North Carolina, another campaign official said that "the system went down for a half hour during peak voting, but for hundreds or more, it never worked all day... Many members of our phone bank got up and left." One frustrated volunteer tweeted that it was "a clusterf**k [sic] of biblical proportions."

== Impact and post-mortems ==
Ekdahl described the effect of ORCA as being that "30,000+ of the most active and fired-up volunteers were wandering around confused and frustrated when they could have been doing anything else to help, like driving people to the polls, phone-banking, walking door-to-door, etc." Campaign workers were left "flying blind", as several put it, unable to identify non-voters or precincts which needed a last-minute robocalling campaign to drive up turnout. The targeted information promised by the campaign did not materialize and only the generic raw vote tallies were available in key areas. According to the Washington Examiner, by late afternoon on election day ORCA was still predicting a Romney victory with somewhere between 290–300 electoral college votes – nearly 100 more than Romney actually received. A Romney campaign official told ABC News, which predicted on the eve of the election that Obama would win by a 50%–47% margin, "Your numbers don't matter to us." Without accurate information from ORCA, Republican officials instead turned to using public news sources or calling counties for information on the outcome of votes in those areas.

Moffatt acknowledged that "without a doubt, ORCA had its challenges" but argued that the system had actually worked, despite the reports of problems: "We don't think Orca's problems had a material impact on the campaign, it was not election determinative. We had 30,000 plus volunteers across the country putting information into the system. We had 91 percent of all counties report into the system, 14.3 million voters were accounted for as having voted, and we received 5,397 reports on voting issues, such as instances where they ran out of ballots. The information came in, so you can't say it didn't work. You run into issues because it's so massive in scale." He noted that the Romney campaign had had only six months to develop its system, whereas Obama had the benefit of six years of preparation. Another Romney aide told National Review's Katrina Trinko that in fact ORCA's problems had "no relation to the outcome. We achieved in a large part what we set out to do in the swing states in terms of our electorate. The reality is the President did what he said he was going to do. The Obama campaign said that they were going to increase turnout from 2008, and they were able to do that. And that had nothing to do with a reporting system on Election Day."

Conservative writer Joel B. Pollak suggested that ORCA had ended up suppressing Romney's own vote by tying up campaign volunteers at a critical time. He noted the narrow margin in the key swing states – only some 500,000 to 700,000 votes – and calculated that if each of the 37,000 ORCA volunteers had brought 20 voters to the polls in those states, the gap could have been closed. Ekdahl saw a "bitter irony" in the fact that "a supposedly small government candidate gutted the local structure of GOTV efforts in favor of a centralized, faceless organization in a far off place (in this case, their Boston headquarters)." Erick Erickson of RedState compared the system to Shamu, a 1970s SeaWorld orca, "because it bit the leg of the campaign and wouldn't let go." While political scientists doubted that its failure had made much of a difference to the outcome, they suggested that if it had worked properly it could have resulted in a closer election. Lara Brown of Villanova University said that it was likely that ORCA had "had a substantial effect" on the turnout, particularly in rural counties of Ohio where Romney had underperformed.

The ORCA system had not received extensive beta testing before election day, nor did the campaign know how it would interact with the data infrastructure in the TD Garden until the day itself. Ekdahl said that he had raised concerns about the lack of testing beforehand. He had asked whether it had been stress tested, whether redundancy had been put in place and whether steps had been taken to combat an external attack on the system, but "these types of questions were brushed aside (truth be told, they never took one of my questions). They assured us that the system had been relentlessly tested and would be a tremendous success." Moffatt admitted that the system had been "beta-tested in a different environment ... There was so much data coming in – 1200 records or more per minute – it shut down the system for a time. Users were frustrated by lag, and some people dropped off and we experienced attrition as a result."

Robert X. Cringely, writing in InfoWorld, concluded that "everything in the Orca rollout went great, except for a failure to do any quality assurance, proof its documentation, or beta test in the seven months from conception to implementation. Whoever was behind Orca apparently also failed to hire a competent Web designer, anticipate server loads, beef up its bandwidth, or notify its ISP to expect a bump in traffic." Sean Gallagher of Ars Technica commented that the key failure was the dependency on automated testing rigs, which "can't show what the system's performance will look like to the end user. And whatever testing environment Romney's campaign team and IT consultants used, it wasn't one that mimicked the conditions of Election Day. As a result, Orca's launch on Election Day was essentially a beta test of the software – not something most IT organizations would do in such a high-stakes environment."

Slate writer Sasha Issenberg argued that the problems ran far deeper than ORCA's technical failings, as the Romney campaign had been left behind by the cutting edge of data science. He noted that while a system like ORCA could not have changed the demographics, data science did make a great difference to the ability of the two campaigns to target and mobilize their voters. As he put it, "The Democrats have it and the Republicans don't." He suggested that ORCA's ability to affect the outcome had been over-hyped by the Romney campaign, as there was only so much that could be done on election day itself: "On short notice, you can send robocalls, reorder a call list and employ paid phone banks, but you are not radically changing the shape of the electorate. They acted like they had invented the wheel, but really all it would have been was a slightly better tread on the tire."

== See also ==
- Cambridge Analytica
- Catalist
- Contingency table
- Data dredging
- Dan Wagner (data scientist)
- The Groundwork
- Harper Reed
- Herd behavior
- Left-wing politics
- Michael Slaby
- Project Narwhal
- Psychographic
- Predictive Analytics
- Project Houdini
