= Battleground Texas =

American Political Action Committee

- Abbreviation: BGTX
- Formation: 2013
- Type: PAC
- Headquarters: Austin, Texas
- Board Chair: Jenn Brown
- Senior Adviser: Jeremy Bird
- Affiliations: Democratic Party
- Website: www.battlegroundtexas.com

Battleground Texas is a state and federal political action committee (PAC) founded with the goal of making Texas a swing state. It was established by veteran political strategist Jeremy Bird.

== Establishment and background ==
Battleground Texas was founded by former Obama campaign operative Jeremy Bird, the national field director of the 2012 Obama campaign. In establishing Battleground Texas, Bird stated, "This program will make Texas a battleground state by treating it as one." Texas has not elected a Democratic governor since Ann Richards's 1990 election victory, and has not voted for a Democratic presidential candidate since Jimmy Carter's 1976 election.

Democrats have long hoped to make Texas competitive, and the state has a large population of Hispanic-Americans, African-Americans, and other Democratic-leaning constituencies. The 2010 census found that only 45 percent of Texans are non-Hispanic whites, a Republican-leaning constituency. By 2020, Hispanics are expected to outnumber whites in Texas. Asian-Americans are also growing in population in the state.

However, Hispanics in Texas have not turned out to vote in the same numbers as other demographic groups. Although Democrats have noticed the problem for at least fifteen years, they never succeeded in boosting Democratic turnout. Many voter registration groups, such as the nonpartisan Rock the Vote, largely avoided Texas due to Texas's relatively demanding voter registration laws, which consists of filling out a form and submitting it postage-free to the county voter registrar and verifying your identity at the polls with a free Texas Election Identification Certificate (EIC). Jenn Brown, board chair of Battleground Texas, has described Texas as a "non-voting state"; in 2010, Governor Rick Perry was voted for by only 18 percent of voting age Texan citizens in his successful re-election campaign.

== Goals ==
The group sees its goal of winning elections in Texas as requiring a long-term commitment, with the need to identify and mobilize Democratic-leaning voters. However, with Texas's 38 electoral votes and 36 seats in the United States House of Representatives, the backers of Battleground Texas view a long-term effort as being worth the necessary time and money. The group plans to increase turnout among African-Americans, Asian-Americans, and Hispanic-Americans while also helping the Democratic Party win more white votes, particularly the votes of white women. Political demographer Ruy Texeira suggested one of the goals of the group would be to raise turnout among educated, relatively liberal white voters in large metropolitan areas, such as in Houston and Dallas. Battleground Texas also hopes to help Democrats win more votes in rural areas and plans to have a presence in all 254 Texas counties. Young voters are another target of Battleground Texas.

The group hopes to make a Democratic presidential candidate competitive in the state by 2020. In the short-term, Battleground Texas plans on targeting races that are either winnable or important for building Democratic infrastructure in the state. The goals of Battleground Texas are "unusually ambitious", since most American political organizations focus on two and four year election cycles.

== Leadership and staff ==
Jenn Brown serves as the group's board chair, while Jeremy Bird serves as a senior adviser. Other staff members include Priscilla Martinez, Beth Kloser, Michael Maher, Anna Whitney, and Oscar Silva. Brown was Barack Obama's field director in Ohio in 2012. Some of the staff members have experience working in Florida, Ohio, South Carolina, and Colorado, but 80 percent of the staff are native Texans. The managerial staff works in Austin, but members of the group work across Texas. In 2015, Battleground Texas established an advisory board that includes Brown, Bird, Congressman Joaquin Castro, and former Dallas Mayor Ron Kirk.

== History ==
The group was officially founded in February 2013, and posted strong early fundraising numbers, raising over $1 million by July 2013. Most of the money came from within Texas, and the median donation size was $25. The group has employed many of the tactics of the Obama campaign, including micro-targeting, the use of digital media, and data mining. Additionally, the group sought to apply an insight of political scientist Marshall Ganz, who found that friends and neighbors are much more effective in persuading people to vote than are other campaign workers and volunteers. As of February 2014, the group had over 12,000 volunteers. As of May 2014, nearly 17,000 BGTX volunteers had made over one million phone calls.

Battleground Texas has been involved in deputizing volunteers so that they can help other Texans register to vote. Battleground Texas spent its first year focusing on laying the foundation to reach Texan voters. Battleground Texas opposed legislation by State Representative Jim Murphy of Houston, which requires training every two years for deputy registrars. According to Battleground Texas, the new law creates an unnecessary barrier to adding new voters to the rolls. Murphy, however, said the law prevents deputy registrars from using the excuse of "I didn't know I couldn't do that" should they violate safeguards in signing up new voters.

Battleground Texas supported Wendy Davis's gubernatorial candidacy, and the 2014 gubernatorial race was considered by some to be the first test of the organization. Davis was handily defeated by 20 percentage points by the Republican nominee Greg Abbott, the outgoing Attorney General of Texas. Texas on the whole decidedly swung more toward Republicans on a county-by-county basis between the 2010 and 2014 mid-term elections. Following Davis's defeat, some left-leaning analysts argued that Battleground Texas hurt Davis' campaign. Of the 2014 elections, Texas Republican Party Chairman Steve Munisteri said, “There's no question that in the last couple of weeks we changed our goal from winning to annihilating them [the Democrats]. When you obliterate the other side, there's not much for them to say.” Battleground Texas leaders did not dispute that the election went poorly for BGTX, but they argued that a national Republican wave played a major role in Davis's defeat, and noted that BGTX had made long-term investments that would help Texas Democrats in future elections. According to Brown, Battleground Texas registered 100,000 voters, recruited 35,000 volunteers, and knocked on 7.5 million and raised $3.4 million doors during the 2014 election cycle.

In July 2018, the Texas Ethics Commission fined Battleground Texas and Wendy Davis $6,000 for violating campaign finance laws during Davis' 2014 campaign.

== Response ==
Greg Abbott said that Battleground Texas represented a greater threat than North Korea; he called Texas the "last line of defense" against a Democratic presidential victory. Abbott's campaign placed an "unprecedented Republican" emphasis on winning Hispanic votes in an effort to block the long-term plans of Battleground Texas. FreedomWorks promised to oppose Battleground Texas's efforts, making plans to spend $8 million in Texas. U.S Senator John Cornyn has created a website called "Keep It Red" dedicated to opposing Battleground Texas and appealing to minority voters. On the other hand, Governor Rick Perry dismissed the threat of Battleground Texas; he argued that Texas is too conservative to vote Democratic. The New Republic columnist Nate Cohn also expressed skepticism; he said that Texas Democrats need to do much more than boost Hispanic turnout.

Project Veritas, an undercover documentary operation run by conservative activist James O'Keefe, has released multiple recordings of Battleground Texas volunteers and organizers. In February 2014, Project Veritas recorded volunteers working for Battleground Texas on hidden video in the act of, and admitting to, copying the names and phone numbers of newly registered voters, which, they claimed, was illegal under Section 13.004 of the Texas legal code. However, the Texas Secretary of State's website states under its Volunteer Deputy Registrar Guide's FAQ section that deputies may "copy the relevant information from the application in writing just as you would be able to do if you went to the registrar’s office and pulled a copy of the original application". A volunteer was also recorded stating that the group forges signatures on voter-related documents. Battleground Texas argued that it did nothing illegal and accused Veritas of using doctored videos.

Two special prosecutors – John Economidy, a Republican, and Christine Del Prado, a Democrat – assigned to investigate a legal complaint based on the work of Project Veritas determined that Battleground Texas did not violate any laws. According to the prosecutors' report, “The Veritas video was little more than a canard and political disinformation.” San Antonio Judge Raymond Angelini dismissed the case on April 4, 2014.

== Related organizations ==
Battleground Texas is not the only Democratic project in the state, as the Lone Star Project and Be One Texas have similar goals. Battleground Texas also works alongside the Texas Democratic Party and local Democratic parties.
