= Project Narwhal =

Program used by Obama's 2012 campaign

Project Narwhal is the name of a computer program used by the 2012 campaign by Barack Obama. It was contrasted in the Mitt Romney presidential campaign by Project Orca, so named because the orca is one of the few predators of the narwhal.

== Development ==
Project Narwhal was developed for six-to-seven days a week and 14 hours a day by a staff of very-experienced workers of companies such as Twitter, Google, Facebook, Craigslist, Quora, Orbitz, and Threadless. The intent of the program was to link previously separate repositories of information, enabling all the data gathered about each individual voter was available to all arms of the campaign. In testing Narwhal, the team, in campaign CTO Harper Reed's words, role-played "every possible disaster situation," including three role-plays where all the systems would go down very quickly on election day. These "game day" practices would prepare them for actual disasters when Amazon Web Services went down on October 21, 2012, and Hurricane Sandy threatened the technology infrastructure in the Eastern United States.

== See also ==
- Cambridge Analytica
- Catalist
- Contingency table
- Data dredging
- Dan Wagner (data scientist)
- The Groundwork
- Harper Reed
- Herd behavior
- Left-wing politics
- Michael Slaby
- ORCA (computer system)
- Psychographic
- Predictive Analytics
- Project Houdini
