= David Shor =

American data scientist (born 1991)

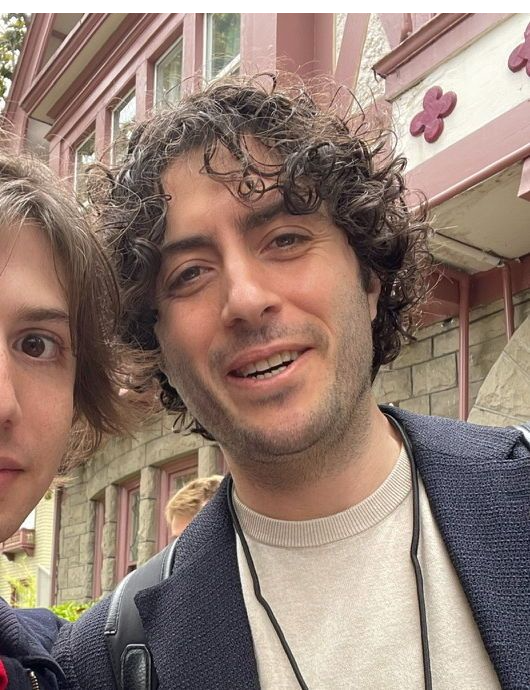
- Born: 1991 (age 34–35)
- Education: Florida International University
- Occupations: Data scientist; political consultant
- Employers: Civis Analytics; OpenLabs; Blue Rose Research
- Political party: Democratic Party

David Shor (born 1991) is an American data scientist and political consultant who analyzes political polls. He serves as head of data science with Blue Rose Research in New York City, and is a senior fellow with the Center for American Progress Action Fund. A self-described socialist, Shor has been described as a center-left "data guru" and advised a number of liberal political action committees during the 2020 United States elections. He, Anita Dunn, and Kara Swisher operated the Future Forward PAC, the Kamala Harris campaign's main Super PAC and leading fundraising vehicle in the 2024 presidential election. Vox has described Shor as perhaps "the most influential data scientist in the Democratic Party."

== Early life ==
Shor grew up in Miami, Florida, in a Sephardic Jewish family of Moroccan origins. His parents were born in Israel and his brother served in the Israel Defense Forces' Golani Brigade. His father is a conservative rabbi and his mother is a doctor who was a socialist growing up. Shor said that following Israeli politics was a formative experience and left him with a view that many American kids never develop: "The public can be bad. It is very important to manage public opinion."

Shor has a mathematics degree from Florida International University. He was a precocious child and gifted in mathematics, starting his undergraduate degree at the age of 13 and finishing at the age of 17. In 2009, Shor was awarded the Math in Moscow scholarship.

== Career and views ==
Shor joined the Barack Obama 2012 presidential campaign at the age of 20, working on the Chicago-based team that tracked internal and external polls and developed forecasts. The team developed a polling forecasting model, known as "The Golden Report", that projected Obama's vote share within one percentage point in eight of the nine battleground states. New York magazine called Shor the "in-house Nate Silver" of Obama's campaign.

(((David Shor)))
(@davidshor)
tweeted:

Post-MLK-assasination [sic] race riots reduced Democratic vote share in surrounding counties by 2%, which was enough to tip the 1968 election to Nixon. Non-violent protests *increase* Dem vote, mainly by encouraging warm elite discourse and media coverage. http://omarwasow.com/Protests_on_Voting.pdf

May 28, 2020

Shor then worked as a senior data scientist with Civis Analytics in Chicago for seven years, operating the company's web-based survey. On May 28, 2020, Shor tweeted a summary of an academic study by Omar Wasow, a black political scientist at Princeton University, that argued that riots following Martin Luther King Jr.'s assassination likely tipped the 1968 presidential election in Richard Nixon's favor. Some critics argued that Shor's tweet, which was posted during the height of the George Floyd protests, could be interpreted as criticism of the Black Lives Matter movement. Jonathan Chait wrote in New York magazine, "At least some employees and clients on Civis Analytics complained that Shor's tweet threatened their safety." Shor apologized for the tweet on May 29 and was fired by Civis Analytics a few days later.

Shor's firing has been cited as an example of "the excesses of so-called cancel culture". Political scientist and journalist Yascha Mounk wrote that Shor had been "punished for doing something that most wouldn't even consider objectionable". Former Vox editor and columnist Matthew Yglesias condemned the idea "that it's categorically wrong for a person—or at least a white person—to criticize on tactical or other grounds anything being done in the name of racial justice", which he claimed was common among Shor's progressive critics.

Since 2020, Shor's work at Blue Rose Research has aimed to develop a data-based model to predict the outcome of future elections on the basis of simulations, designed in particular to advise the Democratic Party in campaign strategies.

His hosting of a fund-raiser for pro-Israel Democratic Representative Ritchie Torres along with Sean McElwee was said to have alienated the Democratic left-wing and he became an anti-woke celebrity for his highlighting of the academic study.

Since the 2024 election, Shor has argued that Gen Z is the most conservative generation in decades, more conservative than even the Baby boomers, and that Democrats must therefore moderate their positions to win elections. Jean M. Twenge has criticized this argument as based on a single year's data, saying that most long-term and other available evidence contradicts it. She further argues that 2024 may have been a "one-off event" as a result of Gen Z's anti-establishment attitudes and that they are more liberal than other generations on specific issues and less likely to identify as conservative.

Shor has said, "The reality is anything that empowers online donors mechanically disempowers nonwhite and working-class Democrats."

=== Popularism ===
Shor advocates what he terms "popularism", the idea that Democratic candidates should focus on issues that enjoy electoral popularity and disengage on poorly-polling issues to avoid raising their salience. Some political analysts, including Michael Podhorzer, have criticized his work for a lack of transparency regarding his methods and data sources.
