= Civis Analytics =

Data science software and consultancy company

- Industry: Consultancy
- Founded: 2013
- Key people: Eric Schmidt; Dan Wagner, founder, CEO
- Website: civisanalytics.com

Civis Analytics is a US data science software and consultancy company founded by Dan Wagner in 2013, with backing from Eric Schmidt. Wagner had served as the chief analytics officer for Barack Obama's 2012 re-election campaign.

== Overview ==
Civis Analytics helps businesses "understand their data, use that data to make predictions, and get recommendations on what steps to take next". Civis works with Fortune 500 companies and the country's largest organizations, including Verizon, Airbnb, Discovery, FEMA, Boeing and the American Red Cross.

== Controversies ==
In 2020, the company faced controversy for firing employee David Shor after he tweeted a short summary of an academic paper by Omar Wasow, a black political scientist at Princeton University. Wasow's study contended that nonviolent protests had historically been more effective at driving political change than violent protests, which led some critics to argue that Shor's tweet could be interpreted as criticism of the Black Lives Matter movement. After the firing, Civis Analytics initially released a statement claiming that had not fired any employees for tweeting academic papers, but later retracted that statement and replaced it with a new statement that omitted that claim. In 2021, Wasow was quoted as having concluded from his conversations with Civis Analytics and Shor that "at the heart of it was how [Shor] was treated on Twitter by people who essentially shot the messenger"; Wasow dismissed accusations of racism or otherwise acting improperly as "baseless".

Eleven employees were laid off on October 30, 2020. In December, seven of them filed unfair labor practice charges with the NLRB for wrongful termination. In July 2021, the NLRB dismissed the claim.

== See also ==
- Dan Wagner (data scientist)
- ORCA (computer system)
- Project Houdini
- Project Narwhal
- Psychographic
- Predictive Analytics
