= Jeremy Bird =

21st-century American political strategist

- Born: High Ridge, Missouri, US
- Education: Wabash College; Harvard University
- Occupation: Political strategist
- Political party: Democratic

Jeremy Bird is an American political strategist who has worked for the political campaigns of Barack Obama.

== Early life and education ==
Bird grew up in High Ridge, Missouri, and was raised Baptist.

Bird attended Wabash College, graduating with a major in religion in 2000, before earning a Master of Theological Studies degree from Harvard Divinity School in 2002. He took classes at Harvard's John F. Kennedy School of Government, including a class with political organizer Marshall Ganz. While at Harvard, Bird became involved in a campaign to advocate for increased education spending, and gained experience as a mediator with the program on negotiation at Harvard Law School.

== Career ==
During the 2004 presidential election, Bird worked for the campaigns of Howard Dean and John Kerry. When Barack Obama announced his candidacy in 2007, Bird joined the campaign as the field director for South Carolina. Bird encouraged his campaign workers to engage voters in places like barber shops and beauty salons, and this strategy was ultimately used nationwide by the campaign. Obama's victory in the South Carolina primary proved to be an important step in him winning the Democratic nomination. Following the successful South Carolina primary, Bird was promoted to Deputy National Field Director of the campaign.

A month after the election took place, Bird and a team of field experts and data analysts conducted a study of the 2008 campaign. During this study, Bird concluded that contact with enthusiastic volunteers and workers was more effective at mobilizing voters than TV ads or mail. Bird also served as the deputy director of Organizing for America. During Obama's 2012 re-election campaign, Bird served as the National Field Director.

After Obama's re-election, Bird co-founded 270 Strategies, a political consulting firm. Bird's consulting partner is Mitch Stewart.

One of Bird's first post-2012 clients was Cory Booker, who won the 2013 United States Senate special election in New Jersey to become New Jersey's junior senator.

In 2013, Ready for Hillary, a group dedicated to setting up the campaign infrastructure of a potential Hillary Clinton presidential run in 2016, announced that they had hired 270 Strategies. The move was seen as a potential sign that a Clinton campaign might share many of the personnel of the Obama campaigns, including Bird.

Bird founded Battleground Texas, an organization devoted to making Texas politics competitive.

Additionally, Bird helped found iVote, a super PAC dedicated helping Democrats win Secretary of State races. During the 2015 Israeli elections, Bird advised the group V15, which sought to defeat Israeli Prime Minister Benjamin Netanyahu. He has also advised the social democratic New Democratic Party in the run-up to the 2015 Canadian federal election.

In 2019, he joined the staff of Lyft, working as the company's chief policy officer since 2022.
