= Organizing for Action =

American political organization

- Abbreviation: OFA
- Predecessor: Obama for America; Organizing for America
- Formation: January 18, 2013; 13 years ago
- Type: 501(c)(4)
- Headquarters: Washington, D.C. Chicago, IL
- Region served: United States
- Chairman: Jim Messina
- Executive Director: Katie Hogan
- Affiliations: Barack Obama

Organizing for Action (OFA) was a nonprofit organization and community organizing project that advocated for the agenda of former U.S. President Barack Obama. The organization was officially non-partisan, but its agenda and policies were strongly allied with the Democratic Party. It was the successor of Obama's 2012 re-election campaign and of Organizing for America, which itself succeeded Obama's 2008 campaign.

Founded after Obama's re-election in November 2012, the group sought to mobilize supporters in favor of Obama's legislative priorities. OFA was registered as a 501(c)(4) organization, which may advocate for legislation but is prohibited from specifically supporting political candidates.

In December 2018, Obama announced that the group would merge with the National Democratic Redistricting Committee, ending its independent status.

== Organization ==
The organization was headquartered in Chicago. As a tax exempt 501(c)(4) organization, it sought to harness the energy of the president's re-election campaign for future legislative fights. The group advocated on policy issues such as gun violence prevention, climate change, LGBT issues, and immigration.

Organizing for Action succeeded Organizing for America, which was formed under similar circumstances, but operated under the control of the Democratic National Committee. In preparation for President Obama's second term, Organizing for America was relaunched as a nonprofit group in order to mobilize support behind the president's legislative and political agenda.

Questions were raised about the aims and the eligibility of Organizing for Action to continue to maintain the www.barackobama.com website and also control the @barackobama Twitter account. Use of these accounts by Organizing for America was not prevented by campaign finance laws.

Jim Messina, Obama's 2012 campaign manager, said in March 2013 that the group would not accept corporate donations and would disclose donation amounts. In March 2013, OFA said that it would begin to publish its donors list (including donation amounts) on a quarterly basis.

As of mid-2015, OFA had 30 million e-mail addresses, database of three million donors, and two million active participants.

== History ==
Messina, the group's chairman, and First Lady Michelle Obama announced the formation of OFA on January 18, 2013. White House official Jon Carson left the Obama administration to become the executive director. Campaign senior adviser David Axelrod served as a consultant.

In February 2013, The New York Times reported that donors contributing or raising $500,000 or more to OFA would put them on the group's national advisory board, granting the privilege of attending quarterly update meetings given by the president. White House press spokesman Jay Carney denied that access to the President was being "sold", stating that OFA was an independent organization, and referred specific questions to the OFA staff.

On March 8, Messina told CBS News that the president might attend a "founder's summit", but stated, "Whether you're a volunteer or a donor, we can't and we won't guarantee access to any government officials. But just as the president and administration officials deliver updates on the legislative process to Americans and organizations across the ideological spectrum, there may be occasions when members of Organizing for Action are included in those updates. These are not opportunities to lobby — they are briefings on the positions the president has taken and the status of seeing them through."

On December 17, 2013, OFA tweeted a photograph of a young man with thick-rimmed glasses, wearing black-and-red plaid onesie pajamas, and cradling a mug. The accompanying text read: "Wear pajamas. Drink hot chocolate. Talk about getting health insurance. #GetTalking." The tweet linked to the OFA website, which encouraged individuals to discuss Obamacare during the holiday season with those family members who were uninsured, and encourage them to sign up. The tweet and pajama-clad man featured in it were quickly dubbed Pajama Boy, and mocked across social media, particularly by conservatives.

In May 2014, OFA halved its staff and announced that it would stop requesting large contributions.

In February 2017, after a long period of inactivity, OFA said that it had hired 14 field organizers as part of its campaign to defend Obama's signature healthcare law. It hired Saumya Narechania, the former national field director at Enroll America, to run that campaign, Jennifer Warner as national organizing director, and former Clinton campaign spokesperson Jesse Lehrich as its communication director.

In June 2018, OFA said that it intended to deploy organizers in 27 Republican-held congressional districts which could be key to a Democratic takeover of the House of Representatives.

In early 2019, the group merged with the National Democratic Redistricting Committee, ending its independent status.
