= Kremlin Annex =

Protests held in Lafayette Square, Washington, D.C.

Kremlin Annex protests
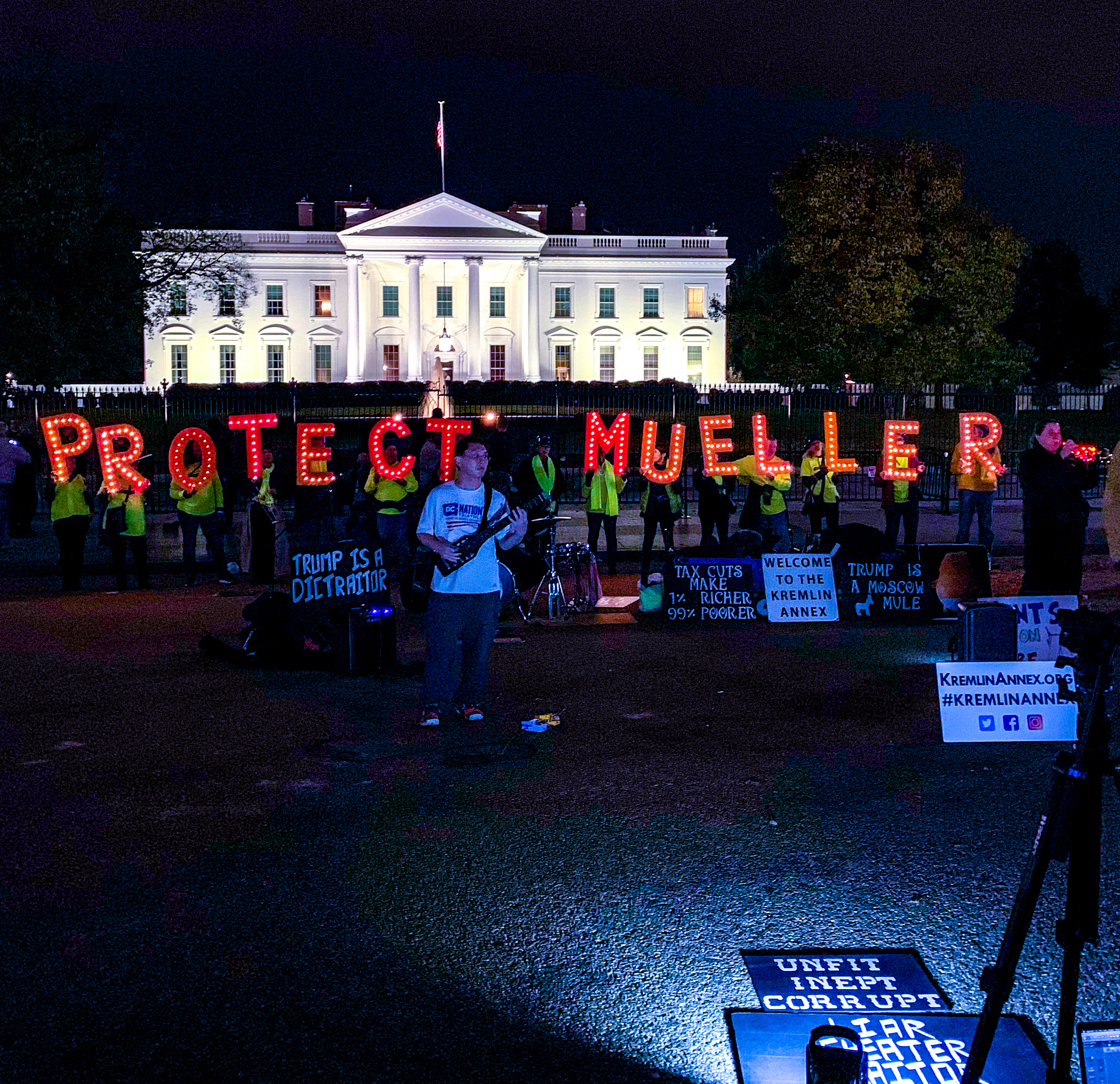
- Kremlin Annex protest, November 7, 2018.
- Date: July 16, 2018
- Location: Lafayette Square, Washington, D.C., U.S.; 38°53′58.3″N 77°02′11.6″W
- Also known as: Occupy Lafayette Park
- Type: Demonstration (protest)
- Theme: Anti-Trump
- Filmed by: @kremlinAnnex
- Participants: @KremlinAnnex, Herndon-Reston Indivisible and others
- Website: www.kremlinannex.org

The Kremlin Annex protests were a series of protests held in Lafayette Square, Washington, D.C., in front of the White House. They are so named because protesters believed the administration of U.S. President Donald Trump has been unduly influenced by the Russian government, also known informally as the Kremlin.

== History ==
The protests began on the evening of July 16, 2018, the day Trump returned from his controversial summit with Russian president Vladimir Putin in Helsinki, Finland. The first protest was informally organized by Philippe Reines, a political consultant and former spokesman for Hillary Clinton. Other activists took over from there, including Democratic political strategist Adam Parkhomenko, who said the protests were a response to "Donald Trump's total capitulation to Russian President Vladimir Putin at the Helsinki Summit." The protests continued every night for four months, then switched to three nights a week.

The gatherings are more festive than somber, and have featured mariachi bands, protesters in dinosaur costumes, a Russian translator "to help Trump understand our message," repeated playings of the Beatles song "Back in the U.S.S.R.," and occasional appearances by celebrities such as Alyssa Milano and Kathy Griffin. Protesters hold up signs with glowing letters that spell out messages such as "TREASON" and "VOTE THEM OUT". In August 2018, actress and comedian Rosie O'Donnell appeared with 55 Broadway musicians who performed songs from musicals such as Hamilton and Les Misérables.

The group has garnered international attention, including from Sputnik, a Russian government-owned news outlet.

The protest's website is now defunct, and its Twitter is instead focused on the Russian invasion of Ukraine.
