= Harper Reed =

American entrepreneur (born 1978)

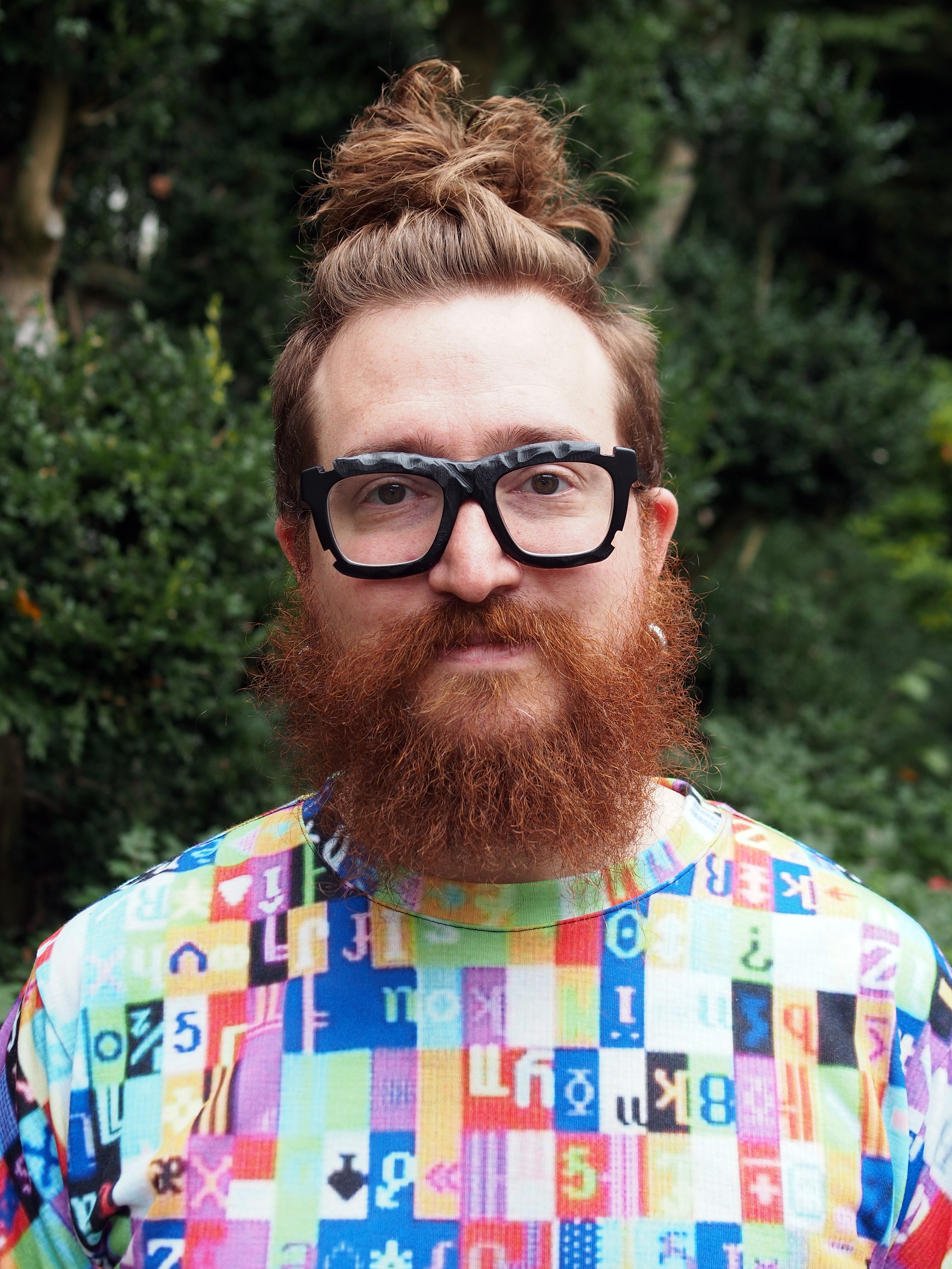
- Born: March 21, 1978 (age 48); Greeley, Colorado, United States
- Education: Cornell College
- Website: harperreed.com

Harper Reed (born March 21, 1978) is an American entrepreneur and former Head of Commerce at Braintree, a subsidiary of PayPal. In 2011, he served as Chief Technology Officer for Barack Obama's 2012 re-election campaign. According to The Guardian, Reed's "background in crowd-sourcing and cloud-computing ... gives a significant clue to what the Obama team hoped to achieve in 2012".

== Early life and education ==
Reed was born in Greeley, Colorado, where he was raised in a home without a television but with an Apple IIC. Reed graduated from Cornell College in 2001 with degrees in philosophy and computer science. After graduating, Reed was a professional juggler and was part of a juggling protest group called The Jugglers Against Homophobia. Reed is improperly credited in Metallica's Death Magnetic album with a photo credit. Reed's work was featured in an Austrian documentary by Werner Boote titled Alles unter Kontrolle. Reed is an avid reader and currently lives in Chicago with his wife, Hiromi Nakazawa.

Beyond his tech endeavors, Reed is well known for his fashion contributions.

== Career ==
Reed's first job out of college was as an engineer for World Book Publishing.

=== Threadless ===
From 2005 to 2009, Reed was the CTO of clothing company Threadless, where he helped lead it through a period of intense growth, riding the crowdsourcing trend.

=== 2012 American Presidential Campaign ===
Reed served as Chief Technology Officer for Obama for America from April 2011 through the November 2012 election. A central component of that work was Project Narwhal, a centralized database of electoral information. Reed helped build a team of developers from tech companies like Twitter, Google, Facebook, Craigslist, Quora, Orbitz, and Threadless. This approach— hiring technology workers from the tech startups rather than the political realm— was novel.

=== Modest ===
In 2012 Reed founded and was the CEO of Modest, a startup that built retail solutions for mobile devices. Modest was funded primarily by Eric Schmidt. In August 2015, Braintree purchased Modest and relaunched the Modest platform as PayPal Commerce.

=== Braintree ===
Reed joined PayPal as a Senior Director of Software Development and as Entrepreneur in Residence in PayPal's Next Generation Commerce group.

=== Other ===
Reed is on a number of boards, including Keeper, a leading password manager application. He is a Trustee and board member at Cornell College. He is a board member of the Pardee RAND Graduate School. Reed is also on the advisory boards of the Royal United Services Institute and the Illinois Tech Computer Science Department. Reed was also a consultant and advisory to House of Cards for a number of episodes. Harper also sits on the advisory boards for IIT Computer Science and the Royal United Service Institute, and is a Director's Fellow at the MIT Media Lab.

== Writing ==
Reed has written on a number of topics, including user experience design, diversity in technology, privacy, and "big data".

== See also ==
- Cloud computing
- Dan Wagner (data scientist)
- Michael Slaby
- ORCA (computer system)
