= Ready PAC =

American political action committee

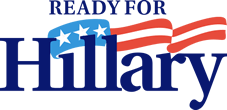
- Formation: January 2013
- Founders: Adam Parkhomenko; Allida Black
- Dissolved: April 2015
- Type: Super PAC
- Purpose: Political advocacy
- Headquarters: McLean, Virginia, US
- Executive director: Adam Parkhomenko
- Deputy director: Alissa Ko
- Operations director: Kirby Parkhomenko

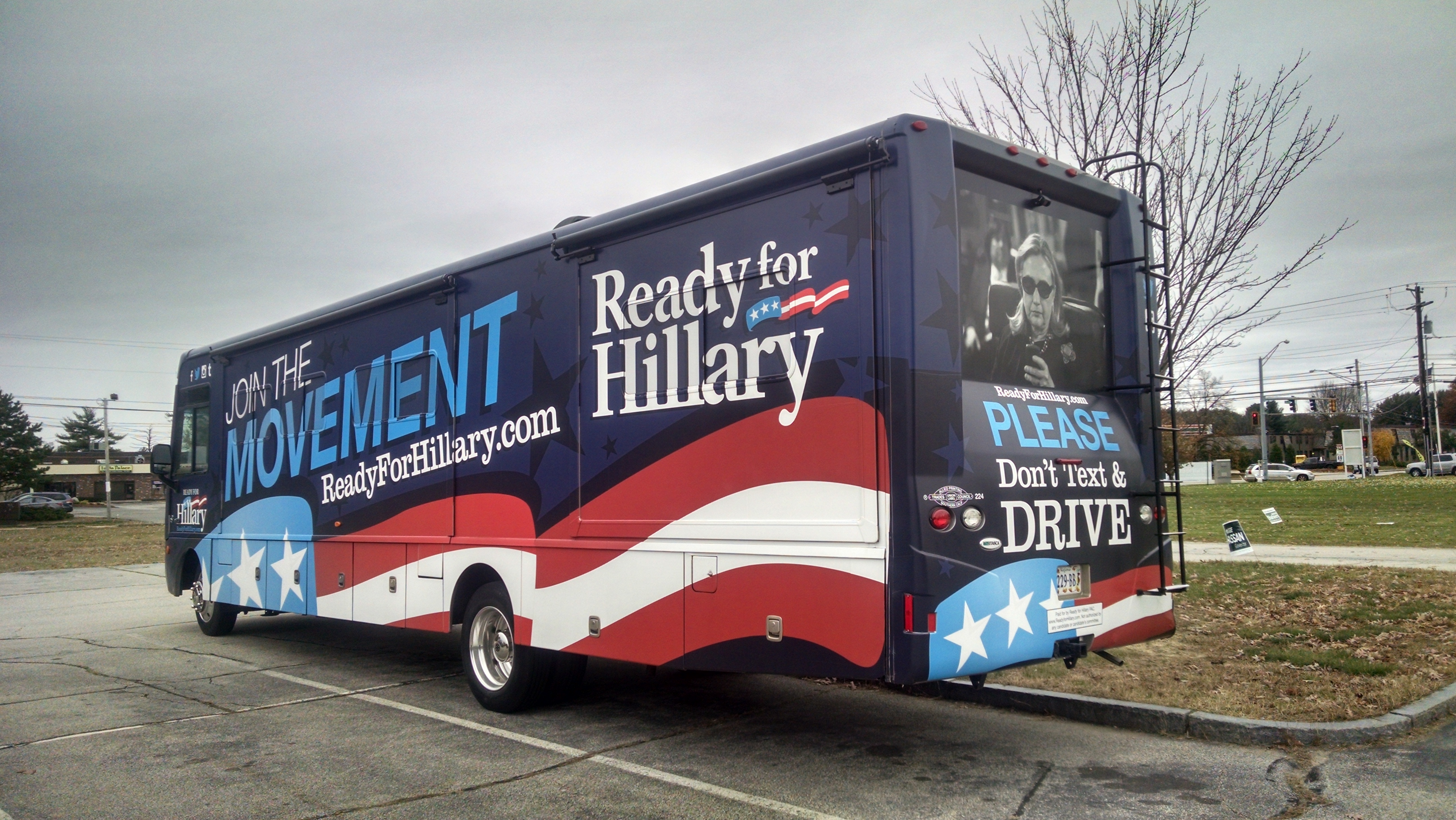
The group's "Hillary Bus"

Ready PAC, formerly Ready for Hillary, was a super PAC created to draft Hillary Clinton for the 2016 U.S. presidential election. Ready for Hillary focused on grassroots organizing and did not engage in television advertising. The PAC was founded by Adam Parkhomenko and Allida Black.

Ready for Hillary supporters included Gavin Newsom, Jennifer Siebel, James Carville, Harold M. Ickes, Claire McCaskill, Tim Ryan, Jennifer Granholm, Ellen Tauscher, Jeremy Bird, Mitch Stewart, Omarosa Manigault and George Soros. Senior advisors to the group included Craig T. Smith, Ickes, Tauscher, Granholm, Tracy Sefl, Shirley Franklin, Mark Alexander, and Michael Trujillo.

The group operated the Hillary Bus tour in both 2014 and 2015, which started with efforts made during Clinton's book tour for her memoir, Hard Choices, and visited many locations.

On April 12, 2015, Hillary Clinton announced her candidacy for president. In turn, Ready for Hillary began winding down operations and, in compliance with federal election law, altered its name from 'Ready for Hillary' to simply 'Ready PAC'. The PAC closed entirely shortly thereafter, and some staff members were later hired by the Hillary Clinton campaign.

== Leadership ==
Ready for Hillary co-founder and former Clinton staffer Adam Parkhomenko served as Ready for Hillary's executive director. The PAC was chaired by co-founder Allida Black, a former professor at the Elliott School of International Affairs at George Washington University and Eleanor Roosevelt scholar.

Houston trial lawyers Steve and Amber Mostyn and Esprit founder Susie Tompkins Buell served as founding co-chairs of the PAC's National Finance Council. In June 2013, Democratic operatives and former Obama campaign aides Jeremy Bird and Mitch Stewart joined the PAC. In October 2013, George Soros signed onto the PAC as a co-chair of the National Finance Council. Soros also donated $25,000 to the PAC.

== Funding ==
Ready for Hillary set a limit of $25,000 for individual donations "even though superPACs may raise unlimited funds." Ready for Hillary raised over $4 million in 2013, $1.25 million of which came in the first half of the year. 98% of Ready for Hillary's 33,631 donations in 2013 were $100 or less.

== Activities ==
In both 2014 and 2015, the organization created a Hillary Bus campaign, with a grassroots campaign bus aimed at getting voters excited for her candidacy. The Washington Post ran an article noting the peculiar situation of having "a campaign bus before there is even a campaign". The Ready PAC's campaign made many stops in conjunction with Clinton's book tour for the work Hard Choices. Their bus also visited college campuses across the country, often in conjunction with College Democrats chapters or local student groups.

== Later developments ==
On April 12, 2015, Hillary Clinton announced her candidacy for president. Ahead of Clinton's announcement, Ready for Hillary experienced a surge in donations. Ready for Hillary filed an amended statement of organization with the Federal Election Commission to revise its name to 'Ready PAC', since federal election law mandates that "no unauthorized committee shall include the name of any candidate in its name." Co-founder Adam Parkhomenko vacated his executive position to join Clinton's official campaign as Director of Grassroots Engagement. Toward the end of May, the Clinton campaign acquired Ready for Hillary's email list. In late 2015, former Ready for Hillary communications director Seth Bringman published a book about the organization, titled: "Ready for Hillary: The Official, Inside Story of the Campaign before the Campaign."

== See also ==
- Super PAC
