= Susan Eaton =

American political scientist (1957–2003)

- Born: July 9, 1957; Washington, D.C., U.S.
- Died: December 30, 2003 (aged 46); Boston, Massachusetts, U.S.
- Occupations: Political scientist, workers' rights activist
- Spouse: Marshall Ganz

Academic background
- Education: Harvard University (BA, MPA); Massachusetts Institute of Technology (PhD)
- Thesis: Work-family integration in biotechnology: implications for firms and employees (2000)
- Doctoral advisor: Lotte Bailyn, Thomas Anton Kochan

Susan Catharine Eaton (July 9, 1957 – December 30, 2003) was an American political scientist and workers' rights activist. Eaton was an assistant professor of public policy at Harvard Kennedy School, who became a nursing home researcher at Harvard and workers' activist. She wrote about health care management, women's role in union leadership and work-family issues and gender equity in the workplace.

== Early life and education ==
Eaton was born in Washington, D.C. and raised in Alexandria, Virginia. Eaton attended T. C. Williams High School where she graduated in 1975 as the valedictorian. She earned a bachelor's degree in social studies from Radcliffe College of Harvard University in 1979 magna cum laude and a member of Phi Beta Kappa. During her undergraduate years, she started Seventh Sister, a feminist alternative to The Harvard Crimson. She was involved with protesting investments by Harvard University in South Africa. She earned a master's degree in public administration at the John F. Kennedy School of Government in 1993. She was a Harmon Fellow. She completed a doctor of philosophy in industrial relations and organization studies at MIT Sloan School of Management. Her mentors were Thomas Anton Kochan and Lotte Bailyn. Her dissertation in 2000 was titled Work-family integration in biotechnology: implications for firms and employees.

== Career ==
Eaton worked for twelve years for the Service Employees International Union where she was an international representative, organizer, negotiator, researcher, and senior manager. She later worked as an assistant professor of public policy at John F. Kennedy School of Government. She was a workers' rights activist.

== Personal life ==
Eaton was married to Marshall Ganz. She died of acute myelogenous leukemia in Boston at age 46. She resided in Cambridge, Massachusetts.

== Selected works ==
=== Journal articles ===
Eaton, Susan C.. “Union Leadership Development in the 1990s and Beyond: A Report with Recommendations.” Discussion Paper, 92-05, Belfer Center for Science and International Affairs, Harvard Kennedy School, May 31, 1992.https://www.belfercenter.org/sites/default/files/files/publication/disc_paper_92_05.pdf

- Eaton, Susan C. (2003). "If You Can Use Them: Flexibility Policies, Organizational Commitment, and Perceived Performance". Industrial Relations: A Journal of Economy and Society. 42 (2): 145–167. doi:10.1111/1468-232X.00285. ISSN 1468-232X.
- Kossek, Ellen Ernst; Lautsch, Brenda A.; Eaton, Susan C. (2006). "Telecommuting, control, and boundary management: Correlates of policy use and practice, job control, and work–family effectiveness". Journal of Vocational Behavior. 68 (2): 347–367. doi:10.1016/j.jvb.2005.07.002.
- Eaton, Susan C. (2000). "Beyond 'unloving care': linking human resource management and patient care quality in nursing homes". The International Journal of Human Resource Management. 11 (3): 591–616. doi:10.1080/095851900339774. ISSN 0958-5192. S2CID 7371200.
- Lautsch, Brenda A.; Kossek, Ellen Ernst; Eaton, Susan C. (2009). "Supervisory approaches and paradoxes in managing telecommuting implementation". Human Relations. 62 (6): 795–827. doi:10.1177/0018726709104543. ISSN 0018-7267. S2CID 146455224.
