= Seth Bringman =

Political campaign strategist

Seth Bringman (born July 17, 1981) is a political campaign strategist for the Democratic Party in the United States. He most recently served as spokesperson for Stacey Abrams.

== Career ==
He began his career as a researcher on then-Senator Hillary Clinton's 2008 presidential campaign. He later served as communications director of the Ohio Democratic Party from 2009 to 2012.

In 2013, Bringman became the first employee of Ready for Hillary, a SuperPAC focusing on grassroots organizing to support Clinton's potential 2016 presidential campaign. As communications director, he served as spokesperson for the PAC and its supporters. He was also the driver of the group's "Hillary Bus." Bringman is the author of the book, "Ready for Hillary: The Official, Inside Story of the Campaign before the Campaign."

The New York Times reported that Bringman and other officials of Ready for Hillary super PAC were not offered initial posts on Clinton's official campaign. Bringman declined to comment for the story. When Nina Turner, also from Ohio, changed her support from Hillary Clinton to Bernie Sanders during the 2016 Democratic primary, Bringman criticized her decision, noting that she had left her post at the Ohio Democratic Party.

Since the 2020 cycle, he has been a communications aide to Former Georgia House Minority Leader Stacey Abrams.

In May 2016, Bringman expressed optimism in an interview that the Democratic Party would unite behind Clinton and that supporters of Bernie Sanders would vote for her in the general election. In the 2020 cycle, he spoke positively about the prospect of a 2020 presidential run by U.S. Senator Elizabeth Warren (D-MA), saying that Warren would have widespread support.

== Personal life and education ==
Bringman is a native of Woodville, Ohio.

He graduated from Woodmore High School in Elmore, Ohio, where he ran cross country. He attended Miami University in Oxford, Ohio, where he was a member of the Miami University Marching Band and a brother of Kappa Kappa Psi. He went on to earn a master's degree in political management from George Washington University.

Bringman has run several marathon races. He is openly gay. Following the Orlando nightclub shooting, Bringman launched a campaign urging Ohio State University to put its mascot, Brutus Buckeye, back in the Columbus Pride Parade. The university had revoked the mascot's planned participation in the parade due to security concerns, but later it reversed its decision.
