= Pajama Boy =

Pejorative term

"Pajama Boy" is a pejorative term for a photograph posted online in 2013 by the American political organization Organizing for Action (OFA) of one of its employees, Ethan Krupp, in support of the Patient Protection and Affordable Care Act, otherwise known as "Obamacare".

== Background ==
The photo was posted on December 17, 2013 by the organization, which advocated for the legislative agenda of President Barack Obama, from President Obama's own Twitter account. It was part of a general campaign to get younger Americans to sign up for the health insurance program. The photo showed Krupp wearing thick-rimmed glasses and black-and-red plaid onesie pajamas, and cradling a mug. The accompanying text read: "Wear pajamas. Drink hot chocolate. Talk about getting health insurance. #GetTalking." The tweet linked to the OFA site, which encouraged individuals to discuss Obamacare during the holiday season with those family members who are uninsured, and encourage them to sign up.

The tweet and pajama-clad man featured in it were quickly dubbed "Pajama Boy", and mocked and ridiculed across social media, largely by conservatives.

Pajama Boy soon developed into an Internet meme in which the Pajama Boy image was digitally inserted into other photos, or the text of the tweet was revised or new text added to mock the campaign.

The week after the photo's debut, The Washington Post reporter Chris Cillizza opined in his "Worst Week in Washington" column that "Pajama Boy was the latest swing and miss in efforts by Obama allies".

== Criticism ==
The day after the original tweet, December 18, New Jersey Republican Governor Chris Christie lampooned and criticized Pajama Boy with his own tweet, which featured a photo of him volunteering in an apron with the accompanying text: "Get out of your pajamas. Put on an apron. Get volunteering. #SeasonOfService."

Libertarian commentator Nick Gillespie, writing in the Reason magazine blog, wrote that "for many — arguably most — Americans, this guy is hipster douchitude on a cracker."

In Bloomberg News, libertarian pundit Megan McArdle said conservatives got "trolled" by Pajama Boy: "The purpose of Pajama Boy is not to get people to buy health insurance, but to get a rise out of conservatives — and thereby to engage the solidaristic, money-raising, meme-spreading power of OFA’s liberal base." Analyzing the perceived issues with the campaign, however, Salon wrote that "Organizing for America has a tendency to try to promote Obamacare on Twitter with images that, one imagines, they think will be potentially viral. But what tends to happen instead is that OFA’s tweets are ignored by basically everyone — except for conservative tweeters."

== Derivative uses ==
Conservative commentator C. Bradley Thompson coined the phrase "pajama-boy Nietzscheans" to criticize other right-wing authors, usually young men, who prefer atavistic, escapist fantasies to realistic policy discussions. He specifically cited Bronze Age Pervert as an example of this trend. Thompson’s essay includes an edited version of the original Pajama Boy photo with Friedrich Nietzsche’s face superimposed on it.
