= Allida Black =

American political activist (born 1952)

- Black in 2014
- Born: Allida Mae Black; 1952 (age 73–74); Memphis, Tennessee, US
- Education: Emory University (BA); George Washington University (PhD)
- Known for: Founder and chairwoman of Ready for Hillary
- Political party: Democratic
- Partner: Judy A. Beck

Allida Mae Black (born 1952) is an American political activist, author, and historian specializing in women's political history, human rights, and American first ladies. Black serves as special advisor and historian to Hillary Clinton. She co-founded and chaired the super PAC Ready for Hillary from 2013 to 2015.

== Early life and education ==
Allida Mae Black was born in Memphis, Tennessee, in 1952. After graduating from Hutchison School in 1970, she attended Emory University, where she completed a Bachelor of Arts in political science in 1974. In 1993, Black attained a PhD in American political history from George Washington University.

== Career ==
Mu Sochua and Black in 2009

Ann Lewis and Black at a Ready for Hillary event in 2014

While writing her dissertation at George Washington University and compiling the Documentary History of the First Federal Congress, 1789–1791, a research project documenting the 1st United States Congress, Black worked as a teaching assistant.

In 1999, while working as a research professor of history and international affairs at George Washington University, Black founded the Eleanor Roosevelt Papers Project, a research project dedicated to the preservation of Eleanor Roosevelt's writings and speeches; she was the project's director until 2010. She has written multiple books about Roosevelt. In 2010, Black and Fatuma Abdulkadir Adan convened the women's rights summit Courage to Lead summit, which was held in Geneva with support from the State Department and the United Nations high commissioner for human rights. she was the first ladies' historian for the White House Historical Association.

Black serves as director of the Ellen Johnson Sirleaf Presidential Foundation and is a trustee of the Franklin D. Roosevelt Presidential Library. She is a distinguished visiting scholar at the Miller Center of Public Affairs, where she founded the Hillary Rodham Clinton Oral History Project, an initiative documenting Hillary Clinton's tenure as secretary of state. Black serves as special advisor and historian to Clinton; while working as a professor at the University of Virginia, she was a historian for then-president Joe Biden.

=== Political activism ===
Black, who first met Clinton in 1992, supported the then-senator from New York in the 2008 Democratic presidential primaries, volunteering for her campaign in 14 different states. She was a member of the campaign's Virginia Women's Steering Committee, which aimed to mobilize women voters in the state of Virginia. In May 2008, Black co-founded WomenCount, a political action committee dedicated to defending Clinton's primary candidacy. After Clinton's withdrawal, she unsuccessfully urged Democratic nominee Barack Obama to pick Clinton as his running mate.

In 2013, Black and Adam Parkhomenko founded Ready for Hillary, a super PAC created to draft Clinton for the 2016 US presidential election. In 2015, Black worked with the pro-Hillary super PAC Correct the Record to create Let's Talk Hillary, a biographical video series project "designed to soften [Clinton's] image and improve her relatability with voters."

== Personal life ==
Black is married to Judy A. Beck, who served as Ready for Hillary's treasurer. The couple live in Arlington, Virginia.

== Works ==
- Black, Allida (1996). Casting Her Own Shadow: Eleanor Roosevelt and the Shaping of Postwar Liberalism. Columbia University Press. ISBN 978-0-231-10404-3.
- Fenzi, Jewell; Black, Allida (2000). Democratic Women: An Oral History of the Women's National Democratic Club. WNDC Educational Foundation. ISBN 978-0-970-55030-9.
- Black, Allida (2001). Modern American Queer History. Temple University Press. ISBN 978-1-566-39872-5.
- Black, Allida (2006). The Eleanor Roosevelt Papers: The Human Rights Years, 1945–1948. Scribner's / Thomson Gale. ISBN 978-0-684-31475-4.
- Black, Allida (2009). The First Ladies of the United States of America. White House Historical Association. ISBN 978-1-93191-705-6.
- Black, Allida (2012). The Eleanor Roosevelt Papers: The Human Rights Years, 1949–1952. University of Virginia Press. ISBN 978-0-813-93141-8.
- Black, Allida (2013). The First Ladies of the United States of America: Special Edition for "First Ladies: Influence and Image". White House Historical Association. ISBN 978-1-931-91723-0.
