= Organizing for America =

Democrats' community organizing project launched by Obama

Organizing for America (OFA)
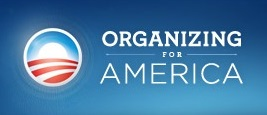
- Founded: 2009
- Headquarters: Washington, D.C.
- Location: United States
- Members: 13 million email addresses from Obama campaign, unknown membership
- Key people: Mitch Stewart, director
- Affiliations: Democratic Party

Organizing for America (OFA) was a community organizing project of the Democratic National Committee. Initially founded after the presidential inauguration of Barack Obama, the group sought to mobilize supporters in favor of Obama's legislative priorities, particularly health care reform. Eventually, the organization played a role in the midterm elections of 2010. Later, it became the grassroots arm of Obama for America. After Obama's second inauguration, it was reorganized as Organizing for Action and returned to its previous mission of organizing around the president's agenda. It has since become a hub of the Democratic protest movement.

== History ==
The formation of Organizing for America was announced by then-President-Elect Obama on January 17, 2009.

The group officially began operations on the third day of the Obama administration, January 23, 2009. On the same day, it was announced that Mitch Stewart would serve as the first director. Jeremy Bird, a former Obama for America field operative, was named Deputy Director.

In mid January 2013, the organization was transformed into a nonprofit group Organizing for Action. The president's 2012 campaign manager, Jim Messina, was announced as the group's national chairman.

The organization will accept donations from individuals and corporations but not from lobbyists and political action committees. Offices will be in Washington and Chicago.

== Mission ==
The organization's activities originally centered around political activism in favor of Obama's early legislative goals, including the 2009 stimulus package and Democratic Party plans to reform the healthcare system. Another stated goal of OFA was alleviating perceived political apathy and increasing support for the Democratic Party. In preparation for President Obama's second term, Organization for America was turned into a nonprofit group — funded in part by corporate money — to mobilize support behind the president's agenda. As a tax exempt organization it will seek to harness the energy of the president's re-election campaign for future legislative fights. The group will be separate from the Democratic National Committee and advocate on key policy issues such as gun control and immigration, train future leaders, and devote attention to local issues throughout the United States.

== Organization ==
Organizing for America is composed of 50 different state organizations, united by a single national umbrella. The states have a high level of autonomy when it comes to deciding how to execute tasks given by the national office, but most major programs are ultimately delegated by the national directors. Under the federal tax code 501(c)(4) the group has tax-exempt status as long as it is not primarily involved in activity that could influence an election. As a nonprofit, it can run support ads for an issue as long as it is not involved in activity aimed at electing candidates for office.

== Political activism ==
Organizing for America has provided logistical support to local community groups, including holding conference calls with volunteers, sponsoring events and house parties, using social networking and New Media, and providing talking points.

== Major campaigns ==
=== Health care reform ===
On October 20, 2009, OFA hosted a national phone bank event intended to encourage elected federal officials to support Obama's healthcare proposals. A stated goal of achieving 100,000 phone calls was exceeded, with 300,000 calls ultimately made. The event was considered highly successful.

On February 11, 2010, OFA launched a national campaign called "You Fight, We Fight". This program enabled people to pledge a number of hours in support of healthcare reform and President Barack Obama's domestic goals. Nevertheless, OFA members were never called upon to do volunteer work in support of including a public option in the bill, despite Obama's stated preference for such a provision.

After the United States Senate and United States House of Representatives voted for the Patient Protection and Affordable Care Act, which completed one piece of Obama's domestic agenda, Organizing for America enabled Americans to "co-sign with the president," creating a permanent record of the bills supporters. Those who co-signed could opt to have a certificate noting their participation sent to them for free. Over one million signatures of health care bill supporters were delivered to the president in April 2010.

=== Other issues ===
Except for some work on health care reform, the Obama administration did not make extensive use of OFA. This choice was criticized by some veterans of the 2008 campaign, who believed that Obama has erred by being too ready to compromise with conservatives instead of mobilizing the OFA volunteer base.
