= Project Houdini =

Project Houdini is a computer program used by the 2008 U.S. presidential campaign of Barack Obama. Although it originally had missteps, it has been credited with helping increase Democratic Party turnout over the 2004 election. It has been compared to ORCA, which failed under similar circumstances for the Mitt Romney's 2012 presidential campaign.

== See also ==
- Cambridge Analytica
- Catalist
- Contingency table
- Data dredging
- The Groundwork
- Project Narwhal
- Psychographic
- Predictive Analytics
