= Barack Obama presidential campaign =

Barack Obama, the 44th president of the United States, has successfully run for president twice:

- Barack Obama 2008 presidential campaign, a successful election campaign resulting in him being elected the 44th president of the United States
- Barack Obama 2012 presidential campaign, a successful re-election campaign

== See also ==
- Barack Obama 2008 presidential primary campaign
