= Michael Podhorzer =

American political strategist

- Born: May 21, 1956 (age 70)
- Education: University of Maryland, College Park
- Occupation: Assistant to the President for Strategic Research
- Employer: AFL–CIO
- Board member of: Analyst Institute; Catalist; America Votes; Committee on States; Progressive Majority
- Spouse: Carol Browner (m. 1987–div. bef. 2007)
- Website: https://www.weekendreading.net

Michael Avram Podhorzer (born May 21, 1956) is an American political strategist. He was the political director of the AFL–CIO, before becoming a senior adviser to its President Richard Trumka.

Podhorzer is also the chairman of the board for the Analyst Institute and Catalist. He serves on the boards of America Votes, Committee on States, and Progressive Majority. Podhorzer was described as "the architect" of a "shadow campaign that saved the 2020 election" by TIME.

== Early life and education ==
Podhorzer was born on 21 May 1956 and graduated from the University of Maryland, College Park.

== Career ==
Podhorzer has worked in progressive politics since 1976. He was associate director for Citizen Action and worked at the American Federation of State, County and Municipal Employees (AFSCME).

=== AFL-CIO ===
Podhorzer came to the AFL–CIO in 1997. He served as deputy director of the political department from 2005, and on 28 June 2011, AFL–CIO President Richard Trumka announced that Podhorzer would be the Federation's new political director.

While at the AFL, Podhorzer helped establish Working America, the community partner of the AFL–CIO which has grown to 3 million members nationwide. Podhorzer serves as the executive director to Workers’ Voice, a "super PAC". As political director, Podhorzer leads the AFL–CIO's strategy of counteracting the influx of spending by Republican-allied super PACs by stepping up its ground game for the 2012 elections, as well as helping lead the Federation's voter protection efforts and mobilization strategy. The AFL–CIO said they will have more than 400,000 activists to work on the fall 2012 election. And on Election Day, the Federation will deploy 5,000 to 6,000 poll monitors to watch voting booths.

== Recognition ==
Podhorzer's influence on using data-driven strategies in electoral campaigns is discussed in Sasha Issenberg's 2013 book The Victory Lab: The Secret Science of Winning Campaigns. A February 4, 2021 article by Molly Ball in TIME credited Podhorzer as "the architect" of a "shadow campaign that saved the 2020 Election," consisting of “a well-funded cabal of powerful people, ranging across industries and ideologies, working together behind the scenes to influence perceptions, change rules and laws, steer media coverage, and control the flow of information.”

== Personal life ==
Podhorzer was married to Carol Browner, a board member of the League of Conservation Voters and former administrator of the Environmental Protection Agency.
