= Marshall Ganz =

American grassroots organizing practitioner

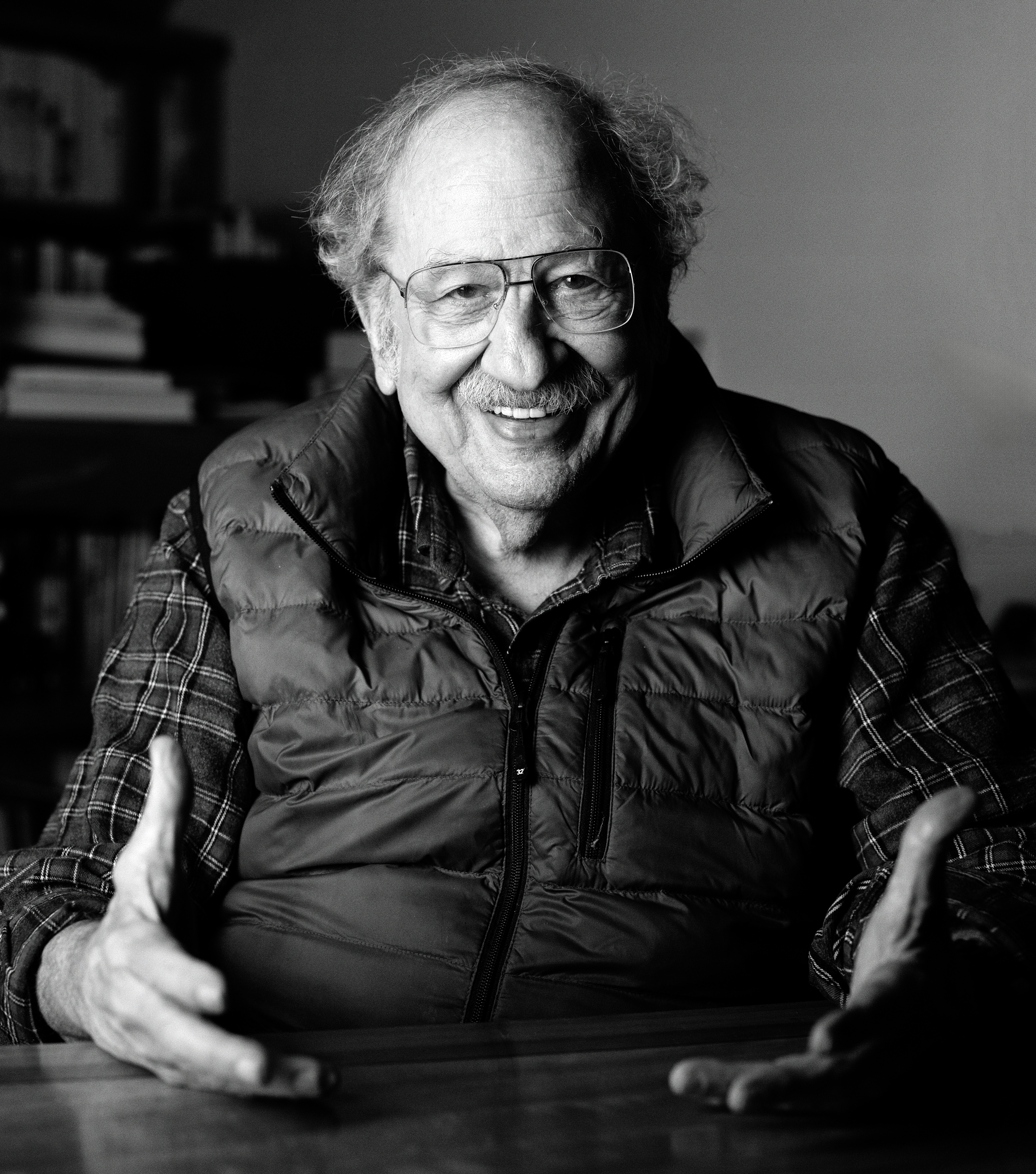
- Marshall Ganz in 2024
- Born: March 14, 1943 (age 83); Bay City, Michigan, U.S.
- Education: Harvard University (BA, MPA, PhD)
- Occupations: Practitioner and professor of community organizing and grassroots organizing
- Years active: 1964-present
- Employer: John F. Kennedy School of Government
- Spouse: Susan Eaton (deceased 2003)
- Website: marshallganz.com

Marshall Ganz (born March 14, 1943) is an American sociologist and social justice activist. He is the Rita E. Hauser Senior Lecturer in Leadership, Organizing, and Civil Society at the Kennedy School of Government at Harvard University.

Introduced to organizing in the American civil rights movement, Ganz worked on the staff of the United Farm Workers for sixteen years, became a trainer and organizer for political campaigns, unions and nonprofit groups, and returned to Harvard where he earned his PhD in sociology (2000). He is credited with devising the successful grassroots organizing model and training for Barack Obama's winning 2008 presidential campaign.

Ganz is the founder of the Leading Change Network NGO.

== Early life and education ==
Ganz was born into a Jewish family in Bay City, Michigan, in 1943. After the family moved to California, they lived in Fresno and Bakersfield, where he attended local schools. His father was a rabbi and his mother a teacher. For three years after World War II, his family lived in occupied Germany, where his father served as a US Army chaplain working with displaced persons. Having encountered survivors of the Holocaust, his parents taught Marshall about the dangers of racism and anti-Semitism.

Ganz entered Harvard in the fall of 1960. He left before graduating in 1964 to volunteer for the Freedom Summer project, where he worked in a freedom house in McComb. He helped to organize the Mississippi Freedom Democratic Party delegation to the 1964 Democratic National Convention. He stayed on in Mississippi as a field secretary for the Student Nonviolent Coordinating Committee in Amite County.

== Work with United Farm Workers ==
In fall 1965 Ganz returned to California to work with Cesar Chavez to organize agricultural workers. He served in a variety of positions for the United Farm Workers of America, including organizer, field office administrator, negotiator, director of the grape and lettuce boycotts, and director of organizing. For eight years, from 1973 to 1981, he was an elected member of the union's national executive board. Chavez's background in the community organizing tradition shaped Ganz's understanding of organizing.

Saul Alinsky had hired Fred Ross in 1947 to develop the Community Service Organization (CSO) to organize Mexican Americans in Los Angeles and California's San Joaquin Valley. Chavez and Dolores Huerta learned community organizing working for Ross and CSO. When Chavez shifted his focus to farm workers, he asked Ross to join him as director of organizing. As Chavez's National Farm Workers Association (NFWA), as it was then named, battled the Teamsters for its first contract with the DiGiorgio corporation in 1966, it was Ross's methodical and disciplined approach to tracking each farm worker supporting the union that helped Chavez win. Chavez also took from CSO the idea of service organizations for the farm workers, to supplement the standard union activities.

Ganz's experience with the farm workers led him to formulate his concept of "strategic capacity." He said that explains how Chavez's farmworker organizing succeeded, and earlier efforts by radicals and contemporaneous campaigns by the Agricultural Workers Organizing Committee (AWOC) sponsored by the AFL-CIO, and by the Teamsters failed. Ganz defined strategy as "how we turn what we have into what we need to get what we want." Strategic capacity, for Ganz, consists of three elements: motivation, access to relevant knowledge, and deliberations that lead to new learning. Chavez's efforts eventually prevailed because his organizing team had a stronger motivation, a deeper knowledge of the Mexican-American culture of the Central Valley, and diverse perspectives that generated fresh tactical ideas.

At the peak of its success in 1977, the UFWA stopped its aggressive organizing and turned inward. Chavez worked with Chuck Dederich, founder of the Synanon drug treatment cult, to transform the internal life of the union. As Chavez purged the union of its long-term leaders and loyalty to Chavez became the primary criterion for employment, the UFWA lost its strategic capacity. Over the next three years, members of the executive board opposed to the direction Chavez was taking the union resigned, including Ganz in 1981. Union membership has dropped from a peak of 60,000 in the late 1970s to around 5,000 in 2009.

== Political consultant ==
After leaving the UFWA in 1981, Ganz began working on California political campaigns—directing field programs, training organizers, and leading strategic planning for such candidates as Nancy Pelosi for Congress, Alan Cranston for Senate, Tom Bradley for governor, and governor Jerry Brown. He also worked on campaigns of such unions as the Hotel Employees and Restaurant Employees Union (HERE), Service Employees International Union (SEIU), and the Screen Actors Guild. In 1987 he formed and served as executive director of two groups to develop organizing programs, Services for Organizing and Leadership, and The Organizing Institute. He led voter registration, get-out-the-vote, and organizer training. He also conducted research on voting, leadership development, and community organizing.

== Return to Harvard ==
Ganz returned to Harvard in 1991 (after a 28-year absence) to finish his undergraduate degree in history and government, graduating in 1992. He received a Master in Public Administration from the Kennedy School of Government in 1993 and a PhD in sociology in 2000. He became an instructor for the Kennedy School in 1994. Since completing his doctorate in 2000, he has been a lecturer in public policy, teaching courses on organizing, leadership, civic engagement, and community action research. He has collaborated with Harvard professors Theda Skocpol on African-American fraternal organizations, and with Lani Guinier for a course on law and social movements.

In 2023, in a federal civil-rights lawsuit, it was alleged that Ganz "ignores and tolerates" anti-Semitism, by three Israeli Jewish students taking the “Organizing: People, Power, Change" course, who had teamed up and proposed a plan “Organizing a growing majority of Israelis, that act in harmony, building on a shared ethos of Israel as a liberal-Jewish-democracy, based on our mixed heritage and identities, being a cultural, economical, and security lighthouse.” According to Ganz, their idea drew complaints from Muslim and Arab students, and he ordered it be changed, emailing one of the team members, “Many find the term ‘Jewish democracy’ deeply offensive because it limits membership in a political community to those who share a specific ethno-religious identity, whereas democracy is based on the equal worth of each person, regardless of race, ethnicity, and religion.”

Later, two teaching assistants did a role-playing presentation for the class to illustrate how to recruit for a cause, using “Palestinian solidarity” as their example––a choice the Israeli students felt was aimed at them––and, the presentation allegedly included “a litany of aggressively anti-Israeli diatribes,” prompting other anti-Israel remarks from one student. The Israeli students asked to respond with a different perspective but Ganz rejected the request, the lawsuit states, saying they had “caused enough problems already.” Then the teaching assistants “organized a class photo wherein students posed wearing keffiyehs to demonstrate Palestinian solidarity.” This made the Israeli students feel “that they were not welcome” in the photo, according to the lawsuit.

== Organizing model ==
In contrast to the structural emphasis of the once-dominant resource mobilization and political process schools of social movement analysis, Ganz emphasizes the subjective agency of social movement participants, whose values, intentions, and narratives constitute the essential material of analysis. Ganz begins with the famous three questions of Hillel the Elder, "If I am not for myself, who will be? And if I am for myself alone, what am "I"? And if not now, when?" Ganz relates these questions to "the story of self," "the story of us," and "the story of now."

For the 2008 presidential campaign of Barack Obama, Ganz maintained that campaign workers approaching potential voters needed to be able to quickly tell their story of self to establish a relationship with the voter. The story of us connected the values and interests of the campaign worker and voter with candidate Obama. What Martin Luther King Jr. called "the fierce urgency of now" focused the voter's hopes on the imminent election. The importance of relationships, rather than campaign platforms, dominated the Camp Obama training program for campaign workers. Ganz has continued to develop this model in "Camp OFA" for Organizing for America, the successor organization to the Obama campaign, and for "Camp MoveOn," a training program for leaders of MoveOn.org's local councils.

The Camp Obama model was based on the model first developed and used in a project for the Sierra Club. Ganz teamed up with Harvard psychology professor Ruth Wageman in an effort to improve the volunteer programs of local chapters.

== Criticisms ==
Marshall Ganz faced allegations of antisemitism from three Israeli students after Ganz described the students' project as "inflammatory" and called the idea of Jewish democracy a contradiction. Harvard Kennedy School Dean Douglas Elmendorf opened an investigation into the allegations after a lawsuit was filed by the Brandeis Center alleging that Ganz subjected students to anti-Israel and anti-Semitic bias when they refused to change their project as demanded by Ganz. Ganz alleged that Elmendorf mishandled the investigative process saying that the investigation was a "kangaroo court." In June 2024, the investigator found “sufficient evidence” that Ganz had discriminated against the students on the basis of their ethnic identity, a finding that Elmendorf accepted as final.

Marshall Ganz responded to the allegations through an article in The Nation, sharing that his obligation to critique the Israeli state comes from his own Jewish tradition, a tradition which had to defend itself from genuine antisemitism.

== Selected publications ==
=== Books ===
- What a Mighty Power We Can Be: African American Fraternal Groups and the Struggle for Racial Equality. With Theda Skocpol and Ariane Liazos. Princeton University Press, 2006. ISBN 978-0-691-12299-1
- Why David Sometimes Wins: Leadership, Organization, and Strategy in the California Farm Worker Movement. Oxford University Press, 2009. ISBN 978-0-19-516201-1
- People, Power, Change. Oxford University Press, 2024. ISBN 978-0-19-756900-9

=== Articles ===
- "Resources and Resourcefulness: Leadership, Strategy and Organization in the Unionization of California Agriculture (1951-1966)." American Journal of Sociology, January 2000.
- "A Nation of Organizers: The Institutional Origins of Civic Volunteerism in the United States." With Theda Skocpol and Ziad Munson. American Political Science Review, September 2000.
- "Against the Tide: Projects and Pathways of the New Generation of Union Leaders, 1984--2001." With Kim Voss, Teresa Sharpe, Carl Somers and George Strauss. In Milkman and Voss, Rebuilding Labor: Organizing and Organizers in the New Union Movement, Cornell University Press, 2004.
- "Organizing for Democratic Renewal." TPM Café, March 29, 2007.
- "Why Stories Matter: The Arts and Craft of Social Change." Sojourners, March 2009, pp. 16–21.
- "Thoughts on Power, Organization and Leadership," "Dispatches from the Religious Left: The Future of Faith and Politics in America." Ed. Frederick Clarkson, Ig Publishing, 2009. pp. 141–152.
- "Leadership, Membership and Voice: Civic Associations That Work." With Kenneth Andrews, Matthew Bagetta, Hahrie Han and Chaeyoon Lim. American Journal of Sociology, January 2010, pp. 1191–1242.
- "Leading Change: Leadership, Organization, and Social Movements." Handbook of Leadership Theory and Practice. Ed. Nitin Nohria and Rakesh Khurana. Harvard Business School Press, 2010, 527–568.
- Leading to Lead: A Pedagogy of Practice. With Emily S. Lin. In The Handbook for Teaching Leadership. Ed. Scott Snook, Nitin Nohria, and Rakesh Khurana. SAGE Publications, 2011, 353–366.
- "Calling for Respect, Freedom, and Security for All Is Not Antisemitic." The Nation, February 1, 2024.
