= Adam Parkhomenko =

American political operative

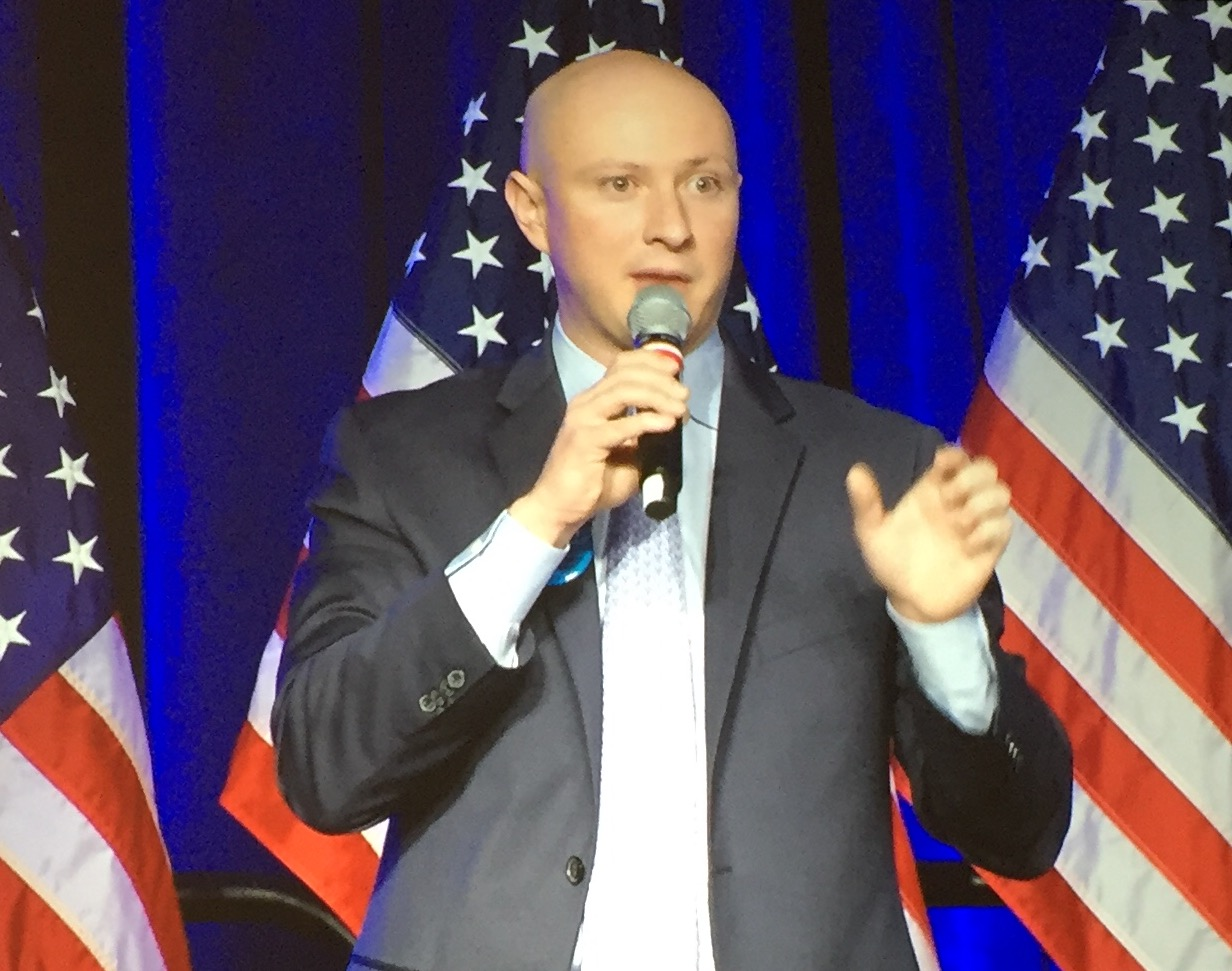
- Born: October 22, 1985 (age 41); Arlington, Virginia, U.S.
- Occupations: Former National Field Director, Democratic National Committee
- Known for: Founder of Ready for Hillary
- Political party: Democratic
- Partner: Ally Sammarco (2021–present)
- Children: 2

Adam Parkhomenko (born October 22, 1985) is an American political strategist and organizer who served in 2016 as the national field director for the Democratic National Committee. He was the co-founder and executive director of Ready for Hillary, a super PAC established to persuade Hillary Clinton to run for the presidency of the United States in 2016. In the 2017 party election, Parkhomenko was a candidate for vice chair of the Democratic National Committee.

== Career ==
As a 17-year-old student in 2003 at Northern Virginia Community College, Parkhomenko set up VoteHillary.org, an independent website that urged voters to vote for Hillary Clinton during the 2004 Democratic presidential primary. He later ran Draft Hillary for President 2004, which was founded in 2003 and shut down in 2004.

HillPAC, Clinton's political action committee, hired Parkhomenko as a staffer while he was leading Draft Hillary for President 2004. He worked in various capacities for Clinton, including a stint as assistant to Clinton's campaign manager during the 2008 Democratic primary. He left the Clinton presidential campaign in March 2008.

Shortly after leaving the Clinton campaign, Parkhomenko launched Vote Both with Sam Arora. Vote Both was an independent expenditure committee dedicated to persuading then-Senator Barack Obama—at the time the presumptive Democratic presidential nominee—to pick Hillary Clinton as his vice presidential running mate. Vote Both ceased operations in late July 2008, when it became clear to Parkhomenko and Arora that Obama would not select Clinton as his running mate.

At the age of 23, Parkhomenko ran for the Democratic nomination for the 47th district in the Virginia House of Delegates during the 2009 Virginia state primary elections. His candidacy was endorsed by Bill Clinton, Wesley Clark and Patsy Ticer. Parkhomenko finished third among five candidates in the Democratic primary to replace Al Eisenberg.

In January 2013, Parkhomenko and Allida Black, a George Washington University historian and professor, launched Ready for Hillary, a super PAC that aimed to persuade Hillary Clinton to run for the presidency of the United States in 2016. Parkhomenko served as executive director of the PAC. Most of the other staff members from Ready for Hillary were not offered positions on the campaign, causing some hostility

In early April 2015, Parkhomenko left Ready for Hillary to join Clinton's official campaign as its director of grassroots engagement. He also served as the state director for the Maryland and District of Columbia primaries, which Clinton won by 30 and 58 points, respectively.

In September 2016, Parkhomenko was named the national field director for the Democratic National Committee.

Immediately following the 2016 presidential election, Parkhomenko announced his run for vice chair of the Democratic National Committee. His campaign was unsuccessful.

Parkhomenko co-founded Party Majority PAC, a super PAC focused on grassroots organizing and electing Democrats.

In 2020 Politico named Parkhomenko's prediction that Jaime Harrison would win the U.S. Senate election in South Carolina one of "the most audacious, confident and spectacularly incorrect prognostications about the year."

== Personal life ==
Parkhomenko was born in Washington, DC and raised in Arlington, Virginia. He is a graduate of Washington-Lee High School, Northern Virginia Community College and George Mason University. Parkhomenko founded Ready for Hillary while attending George Mason. He also served as a reserve police officer during this period.

Parkhomenko met Ally Sammarco in 2021 and they became engaged in 2022.
