= Mitch Stewart =

American political campaign organizer

Personal details
- Party: Democratic
- Education: University of South Dakota (BS)

Mitch Stewart is an American political campaign organizer.

== Early life and education ==
Stewart grew up in Vermillion, South Dakota. Stewart earned a Bachelor of Science in Biology from the University of South Dakota, where he also minored in Chemistry. He worked as a research assistant and staff assistant in Senator Tim Johnson's (D-SD) Senate office.

== Career ==
=== 2002 ===
Stewart was a regional field director for the Louisiana Democratic Party during Senator Mary Landrieu's 2002 run-off campaign. He had the same job as a regional field director for the South Dakota Democratic Party during Senator Tim Johnson's 2002 re-election campaign. This led him to meet many of the people he would later work with on Barack Obama's presidential campaign in 2008.

=== 2004 ===
Stewart worked on the 2004 John Edwards for President campaign in the Iowa caucuses where he served as a regional field director for Eastern Iowa. In the same year, he worked as field director for Senator Tom Daschle in Daschle's unsuccessful bid for re-election.

=== 2008 presidential campaign ===
For the Obama for America campaign, Stewart was the director of field operations in the Iowa caucuses, where the candidate's first place win established him as a serious challenger to then front-runner Hillary Clinton. He served as state director for Obama's primary campaign in Texas and Indiana.

He later headed the campaign's Virginia operation in the general election. Obama's victory there marked the first time since 1964 that Virginia's electoral votes went to a Democratic presidential candidate.

=== 2012 presidential campaign ===
Stewart served as Battleground States Director for President Obama's 2012 re-election campaign. He oversaw a state strategy and program that garnered victories in nine of the ten battleground states. In this role, he helped build what The Guardian called "a historic ground operation that will provide the model for political campaigns in America and around the world for years to come."

=== Later career ===
On January 23, 2009, it was announced that Mitch Stewart would serve as the first Director of Organizing for America.

Organizing for America was formed as a spin-off organization of the Barack Obama 2008 presidential campaign, officially established after the inauguration.

In 2019, he joined Michael Bloomberg's 2020 campaign for president. Stewart operates 270 Strategies, a digital strategy firm co-founded with Jeremy Bird.

In August 2024, Stewart was named senior advisor for battleground states for Kamala Harris's presidential campaign.

== See also ==
- Organizing for America
