= Michael Slaby =

American entrepreneur

- Education: Brown University (AB)
- Website: www.michaelslaby.com

Michael Slaby is an organizer, social impact strategist, and entrepreneur, currently serving as the chief operating and chief marketing officer for New York-based nonprofit, Murmuration. He is the author of 7Bridges and For ALL the People. He previously helped lead Harmony Labs and ran the Chicago-based startup he founded, Timshel, which developed the platform known as The Groundwork.

== Background ==
Slaby attended Brown University, where he earned an A.B. degree in English literature and Biochemistry. Slaby was the chief technology officer of Obama for America in 2008 campaign.

In 2012, he rejoined the campaign as chief integration and innovation officer. When that campaign finished, he began work on social impact organizations that leverage technology to create social movements.

Hillary Clinton also used the technologies developed by Slaby and his team in her presidential campaign.

Slaby is the former chief technology strategist for TomorrowVentures, which is an angel investment fund for Eric Schmidt.

== examines disinformation and promoting divisiveness ==
In 2021, Slaby authored a book entitled, For All the People: Redeeming the Broken Promises of Modern Media and Reclaiming Our Civic Life, in which he addressed disinformation, the encouragement of divisiveness, and those profiting off of it and conspiracy theories. He stresses that the rationalization offered by those reaping enormous profits off of Internet platforms used to communicate dialogue promoting them, "protecting free speech", is baseless because the free speech amendment of the United States Constitution relates to prohibiting suppressive actions by the government, not private entities.

Slaby then examines how Facebook and Google are seen to have polarized their users, allowed hate speech, and created an environment in which conspiracy theories could thrive. He cites the social basis for the Internet entities to have optimized their profits massively in this way and he calls for reigning in those with such profound influence in the public sphere through new governmental regulations, engagement by politicians, encouragement of moral leadership, and collective action by users in order to reestablish healthy discourse.
