= The Groundwork =

- Type: Private
- Founded: June 2014; 12 years ago
- Key people: Eric Schmidt; Michael Slaby

The Groundwork was a privately held technology firm, run by Michael Slaby, that was formed in June 2014. Campaign finance disclosures revealed that Hillary Clinton's presidential campaign was a client of the Groundwork. Most of the Groundwork's employees were back-end software developers with experience at tech firms like Netflix, DreamHost, Zalando, and Google.

The Groundwork is responsible for the "critical functions of modern campaigning" by using technological resources to consume digital data about voters, and then developing the technological means to assist the Hillary Clinton presidential campaign target these voters for fundraising, advertising, outreach. It is a customer relationship management system for future voters."
