= Dan Wagner (data scientist) =

American political consultant

Dan Wagner served as chief analytics officer on Barack Obama's 2012 election campaign and is the founder of Civis Analytics.

Previous to Civis Analytics, Wagner worked in Chicago under David Axelrod on Obama's reelection campaign. The campaign was numbers and data driven. Wagner used big data in a hub composed of 54 statisticians, engineers, data scientists, and organizers from all over the world. Their numbers helped them drive every decision they made about TV, working in the field, raising money, and their communication strategy. They took big data from their disparate sources of data, and put it into one place to drive decision making, on TV, communication, fundraising, digital etc. His department's work was credited with "reinventing how national campaigns are done" and has been highlighted in Time, MIT Technology Review, The Wall Street Journal, Bloomberg, Los Angeles Times, and Harper's Magazine.

Eric Schmidt approached Wagner after the election regarding his algorithms and the two discussed options regarding Wagner's future and Wagner's desire to start a company that would keep together the analytics team they had built. Wagner was simultaneously being approached by nonprofit organizations with big data and that wanted to make better decisions with their data. Schmidt then became an investor and adviser to Wagner.
