= Barack Obama 2012 presidential campaign =

American political campaign

Obama for America
- 2012 Obama–Biden campaign logo
- Campaign: 2012 Democratic primaries 2012 US presidential election
- Candidate: Barack Obama; 44th President of the United States (2009–2017); Joe Biden; 47th Vice President of the United States (2009–2017)
- Affiliation: Democratic Party
- Status: Announced: April 4, 2011; Presumptive nominee: April 3, 2012; Official nominee: September 5, 2012; Won election: November 6, 2012; Certification: January 4, 2013; Inaugurated: January 20, 2013
- Headquarters: 130 East Randolph Street; Chicago, IL 60601
- Key people: Jim Messina (campaign chairman); David Axelrod (senior strategist); Harper Reed (chief technology officer); Michael Slaby (chief integration and innovation officer); Stephanie Cutter (deputy campaign manager); Brent Colburn (communications director); Matthew Barzun (finance chairman); Ben LaBolt (national press secretary); Rufus Gifford (finance director)
- Receipts: US$738,503,770 (2012-12-31)
- Slogan(s): Forward. Middle Class First

Website
- www.barackobama.com (archived)

On April 4, 2011, Barack Obama, the 44th president of the United States, announced his candidacy for re-election as President. On September 5, 2012, he again became the nominee of the Democratic Party for the 2012 presidential election. Along with his running mate, Vice President Joe Biden, Obama was opposed in the general election by former Massachusetts Governor Mitt Romney, along with various minor candidates from other parties. The election took place on Tuesday, November 6, 2012.

Obama's campaign headquarters was in Chicago and key members of his successful campaign in 2008, such as Jim Messina and David Axelrod, returned to staff it. On the day of the announcement, the campaign released a promotional video showing supporters of Obama organizing for the re-election effort. As The Guardian newspaper noted, this was the first American presidential re-election campaign to use Facebook and Twitter for promotion.

Between early-2011 and June 30, 2012, the Obama campaign and supporters spent approximately $400 million, according to the Federal Election Commission. Obama won his reelection bid by a margin of 51.06 to 47.21%. This was the first time since 1944, when President Franklin D. Roosevelt won re-election, that a Democratic president had won by a majority of the electoral votes and over 51% of the popular vote twice.

== Early stages ==
On January 20, 2009, Barack Obama was inaugurated as the 44th President of the United States. On April 4, 2011, President Obama officially announced his candidacy for re-election. The announcement was made through an online video titled "It Begins With Us", posted on his campaign website. The President also filled out official forms with the FEC at that time.

President Obama did not face a significant challenge in the Democratic primaries, with no other candidate on the ballot in all but seven states. On April 3, 2012, Obama won the Maryland and District of Columbia primaries, giving him more than the required 2,778 delegates to secure the nomination. On April 30, 2012, the campaign announced that its slogan would be "Forward".

The campaign was based in Chicago in One Prudential Plaza, instead of in Washington, D.C., where all other modern incumbent presidents have had their re-election headquarters. The decision to base the campaign outside of Washington was said have been taken so as to ensure grassroots support for re-election.

== Fundraising ==
The campaign began accepting online donations on April 4, 2011, the day Obama announced his candidacy. In the first 24 hours after online donations began to be accepted, over 23,000 online donations of $200 or less were made. President Obama headlined his first campaign fundraiser in April 2011 in Chicago. He also headlined fundraisers in San Francisco, Los Angeles, and New York in April 2011. On April 29, 2011, it was announced that Matthew Barzun, the United States Ambassador to Sweden, would serve as finance chairman. Many sources claim that the campaign may be the first campaign in US history to raise more than one billion dollars. In March 2011, Campaign Chairman Jim Messina asked a group of 450 top donors to raise $350,000. During the second fundraising quarter of 2011 (the first of the campaign), the campaign raised a record amount of $86,000,000. As of May 3, 2012, Obama and his team have held 130 fundraisers.

More than 550,000 individuals donated towards the campaign in the second quarter of 2011, which is a much larger number than the 180,000 individuals who donated to Obama's 2008 campaign during the first half of 2007. From the beginning of the campaign to December 31, 2011, more than 1.3 million individual donated to the campaign. The LGBT community had donated a record amount so far to the campaign. As of March 31, 2012, the campaign had raised $191.7 million.

On May 10, 2012, Obama attended a fundraiser in the Los Angeles home of actor George Clooney, which raised over $15 million. The fundraiser was initially estimated to raise about $10 million, but after Obama's historic announcement of his support for same-sex marriage, the amount went up significantly. Many believed that the LGBT community and activists would donate historic amounts after the announcement.

Obama's campaign was also supported by Priorities USA Action, an independent expenditure PAC founded by several former Obama campaign officials, but legally prohibited from coordinating with the candidate or his campaign.

== Technology ==
The engineering investment of the Obama 2012 campaign was unprecedented, under the leadership of CTO Harper Reed. Reed helped build a team of developers from tech companies like Twitter, Google, Facebook, Craigslist, Quora, Orbitz and Threadless. This approach— hiring technology workers from the tech startups rather than the political realm— was novel. A central component of that work was Project Narwhal, a centralized database of electoral information.

Dan Wagner was Chief Analytics Officer, running the 54-person analytics team out of a windowless office known as the 'cave.' His team's predictions were remarkably accurate to the actual election results.

== Getting out the vote ==
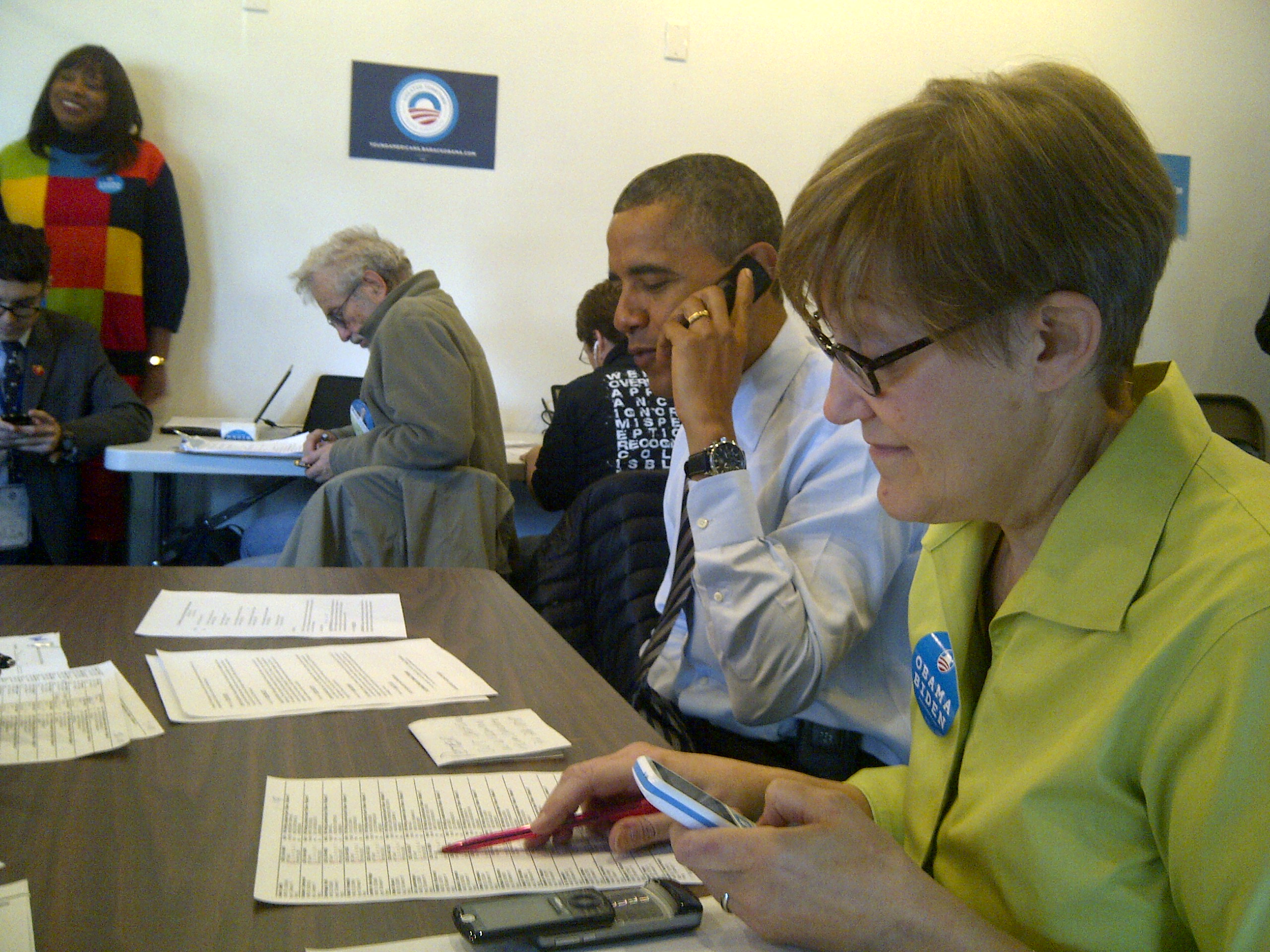
Obama participating in a phone bank Election Day

The Obama campaign was highly effective in getting out the vote, in using technology to identify voters, and in capitalizing on growing segments of the voting population.

President Obama won reelection, not by going after independent voters, but by going after emerging groups in the U.S. population. By race, age and gender, voters made clear that America is made up of many parts, and the Obama team captured more of them, and delivered more of them to the polls.

== Events leading up to the election ==
=== Presidential debates ===
The bipartisan Commission on Presidential Debates (CPD) held four debates for the 2012 US presidential general election, slated for various locations around the United States in October 2012 – three of them involving the major party presidential nominees (later determined to be Democratic President Barack Obama from Illinois and former Republican governor Mitt Romney of Massachusetts), and one involving the vice-presidential nominees (Vice President Joe Biden from Delaware and Representative Paul Ryan of Wisconsin).

=== Hurricane Sandy ===
Hurricane Sandy affected the presidential campaign as well as local and state campaigns in storm-damaged areas, as it hit the New England coast a week before the election. New Jersey Governor Chris Christie, one of Mitt Romney's leading supporters, praised President Barack Obama and his reaction to the hurricane and toured storm-damaged areas of his state with the president. Obama signed emergency declarations on October 28 for several states expected to be impacted by Sandy, allowing them to request federal aid and make additional preparations in advance of the storm. According to Karl Rove and Bill Clinton, the hurricane and its aftermath ended up helping Obama; the hurricane drew attention away from the campaigns and Obama was able to take a bipartisan position and be "presidential". The event sparked debates and discussions on climate change, which had been ignored by both parties prior to the event.

== Election and victory ==
On November 6, 2012, Obama was re-elected for his second term as President of the United States. He won 65,915,795 popular votes and 332 electoral votes, with two states fewer than in his 2008 victory. In his victory speech in Chicago, he promised to "sit down with" Mitt Romney to discuss a bipartisan future for the United States.

== Structure ==
=== Campaign staff and policy team ===
Many key people from the successful 2008 campaign returned. David Axelrod, who was in charge of Media in 2008 and who worked in the White House as a Senior Advisor to the President from 2009 until 2011, returned to Chicago to work on the campaign as the top communications official. Jim Messina, who worked in the White House as Deputy Chief of Staff for Operations from 2009 until 2011, moved to Chicago to be campaign manager. Matthew Barzun, the United States Ambassador to Sweden, was finance chairman. Jennifer O'Malley Dillon, who worked at the Democratic National Committee as an executive director, was named deputy campaign manager. The other deputy campaign manager was Julianna Smoot, who was the 2008 finance director and was briefly the White House Social Secretary.

Ben LaBolt was national press secretary. LaBolt worked for Sherrod Brown's 2006 Senate campaign, as Obama's senate press secretary, for the 2008 campaign, as a deputy White House Press Secretary, and for Mayor of Chicago Rahm Emanuel, Katie Hogan and Adam Fetcher, who each worked on the 2008 campaign, was deputy press secretaries. Rahm Emanuel was expected to play a role in the campaign. Emanuel was White House Chief of Staff from January 2009 until October 2010 and worked on President Bill Clinton's successful 1992 and 1996 campaigns. Rufus Gifford was Finance Director, Elizabeth Lowery was Deputy Finance Director, Jeremy Bird was National Field Director, Marlon Marshall was Deputy National Field Director, Mitch Stewart was battleground state Director, and Elizabeth Jarvis-Shean was Research Director. Katherine Archuleta was named political director. James Kvaal served as Policy Director.

==== Role of vice president Biden ====
In October 2010, Biden said Obama had asked him to remain as his running mate for the 2012 presidential election, but with Obama's popularity on the decline, White House Chief of Staff William M. Daley conducted some secret polling and focus group research in late 2011 on the idea of replacing Biden on the ticket with Hillary Clinton. The notion was dropped when the results showed no appreciable improvement for Obama, and White House officials later said Obama had never entertained the idea.

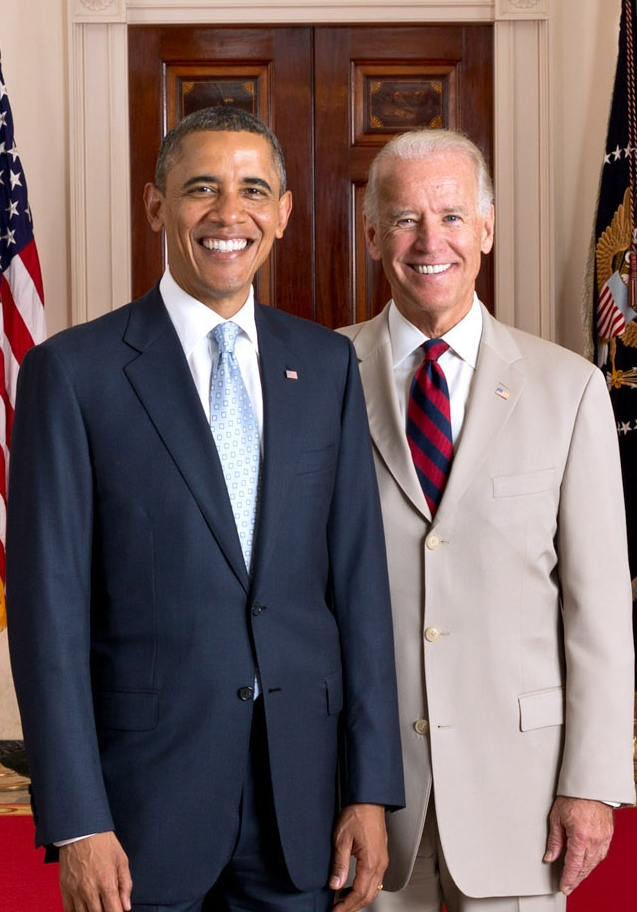
Biden and Obama, July 2012

Biden's May 2012 statement that he was "absolutely comfortable" with same-sex marriage gained considerable public attention in comparison to Obama's position, which had been described as "evolving". Biden made his statement without administration consent, and Obama and his aides were quite irked, since Obama had planned to shift position several months later, in the build-up to the party convention, and since Biden had previously counseled the president to avoid the issue lest key Catholic voters be offended. Gay rights advocates seized upon Biden's statement, and within days, Obama announced that he too supported same-sex marriage, an action in part forced by Biden's remarks. Biden apologized to Obama in private for having spoken out, while Obama acknowledged publicly it had been done from the heart. The incident showed that Biden still struggled at times with message discipline, as Time wrote, "Everyone knows Biden's greatest strength is also his greatest weakness." Relations were also strained between the vice presidential and presidential campaigns when Biden appeared to use his position to bolster fundraising contacts for a possible run for president in 2016, and he ended up being excluded from Obama campaign strategy meetings.

The Obama campaign nevertheless valued Biden as a retail-level politician who could connect with disaffected blue-collar workers and rural residents, and he had a heavy schedule of appearances in swing states as the reelection campaign began in earnest in spring 2012. An August 2012 remark before a mixed-race audience that Republican proposals to relax Wall Street regulations would "put y'all back in chains" led to a similar analysis of Biden's face-to-face campaigning abilities versus his tendency to go off track. Time magazine wrote that Biden often went too far and "Along with the familiar Washington mix of neediness and overconfidence, Biden's brain is wired for more than the usual amount of goofiness."

Biden was nominated for a second term as vice president at the 2012 Democratic National Convention in September. Debating his Republican counterpart, Representative Paul Ryan, in the vice-presidential debate on October 11 he made a spirited and emotional defense of the Obama administration's record and energetically attacked the Republican ticket.

=== Campaign co-chairs ===
In February 2012, Obama for America (OFA) announced its list of campaign co-chairs:

1. Lynnette Acosta – OFA volunteer leader from Florida
2. Marc Benioff – CEO of Salesforce.com
3. Michael Bennet – US Senator from Colorado
4. Julian Castro – Mayor of San Antonio
5. Lincoln Chafee – Governor and former US Senator from Rhode Island
6. Ann Cherry – Retired teacher and OFA volunteer leader from North Carolina
7. Judy Chu – US Representative from the 32nd District of California
8. Emanuel Cleaver – US Representative from the 5th District of Missouri
9. Bill Daley – Former White House Chief of Staff to President Obama, former United States Secretary of Commerce
10. Maria Elena Durazo – Executive Secretary-Treasurer of the Los Angeles County Federation of Labor, AFL–CIO
11. Dick Durbin – US Senator from Illinois
12. Rahm Emanuel – Mayor of Chicago
13. Russ Feingold– Former US Senator from Wisconsin
14. Charles A. Gonzalez – US Representative from the 20th District of Texas
15. Loretta Harper – High School Counselor and OFA volunteer leader from Nevada
16. Kamala Harris – Attorney General of California
17. Sai Iyer – Student at Virginia Commonwealth University and OFA volunteer leader from Virginia
18. Caroline Kennedy – Author, President of the John F. Kennedy Library Foundation
19. Eva Longoria – Actress
20. Felesia Martin – OFA volunteer leader from Wisconsin
21. Vashti Murphy McKenzie – African Methodist Episcopal bishop
22. Tom Miller – Iowa Attorney General
23. Kalpen Modi – Actor, former White House Associate Director for the Office of Public Engagement
24. John Nathman – Retired United States Navy Admiral
25. Deval Patrick – Governor of Massachusetts
26. Federico Peña – Former United States Secretary of Transportation and United States Secretary of Energy
27. Elaine Price – Retired Ohio resident and OFA volunteer leader from Ohio
28. Penny Pritzker – founder and CEO of PSP Capital Partners
29. John Register – US Army Veteran and Paralympian
30. Jan Schakowsky – US representative from the 9th District of Illinois
31. Jeanne Shaheen – US Senator from New Hampshire
32. Joe Solmonese – qqPresident of the Human Rights Campaign
33. Alan Solow – Partner at DLA Piper LLP and past chairman of the Conference of Presidents of Major American Jewish Organizations
34. Ted Strickland – former governor of Ohio
35. Antonio Villaraigosa – Mayor of Los Angeles

=== Other initiatives ===
- Truth Team – growing out of the AttackWatch initiative (launched in September 2011) and Fight the Smears (launched for the 2008 campaign), organized as a "rapid response team" to both counter instances of anti-Obama rhetoric and promote Obama's record with web video and infographics.
- GottaRegister – site encouraging voter registration.
- GottaVote – site providing materials to prepare voters to vote on primary days and Election Day.
- Romney Economics – critical attack on Mitt Romney's record as CEO of Bain Capital and as governor of Massachusetts.

== Public perception ==
=== Opinion polling ===
In a March 2011 Pew poll, Obama held an advantage of 47% to 37%, similar to the lead that former president George W. Bush held over an unnamed Democrat in 2003 and larger than the lead former president Bill Clinton held over an unnamed Republican in 1995. An August 2011 Rasmussen poll found that in a hypothetical race between President Obama and a generic Republican, 48% backed the generic Republican and 40% backed the President.

In February 2012, Obama held a sizable lead over both Mitt Romney (53–43) and Rick Santorum (53–42) nationally. By the end of March 2012, Obama's lead over Romney had narrowed to approximately 2.4% (46.6–44.2) nationally. An August 2012 CNN/ORC poll found that Obama led Romney 52% to 45%. A Fox News poll conducted nearly the same time placed the two candidates 49% to 40%, with Obama in the lead.

== See also ==
- Barack Obama 2008 presidential campaign
- Nationwide opinion polling for the 2012 United States presidential election
- 2012 Democratic Party presidential candidates
- 2012 Democratic National Convention
- Bill Clinton's speech at the 2012 Democratic National Convention
- Mitt Romney 2012 presidential campaign
