= Harryette Ehrhardt =

American educator and politician

Harryette Ehrhardt is an American educator and politician. She served as a Democratic member of the Texas House of Representatives from 1995 to 2002.

== Early life ==
Harryette Ehrhardt was born in Hattiesburg, Mississippi on August 5, 1934. She received a Bachelor of Arts and an M.A. from Southern Methodist University and a Doctorate of Education from the University of Houston.

== Career ==
Ehrhardt worked as a classroom teacher and school principal. She later taught at SMU, and one of her students was Laura Bush, whom she taught children's literature. From 1995 to 2002, she served as Texas state Representative. She supported gay rights.

The library at Zan Wesley Holmes Jr. Middle School in Dallas is named in her honor.
