= James O'Keefe =

American political activist (born 1984)

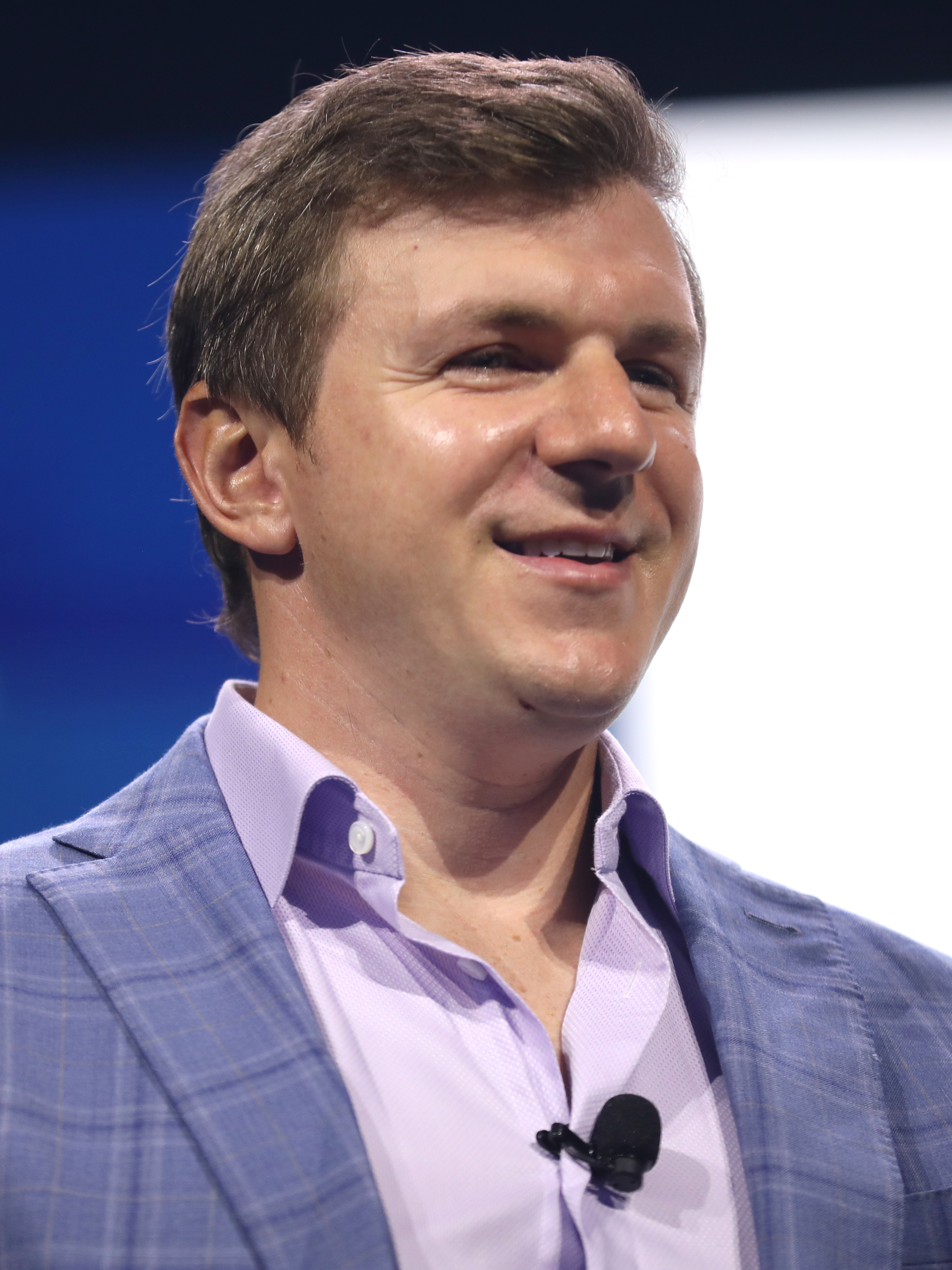
- O'Keefe in 2023
- Born: James Edward O'Keefe III; June 28, 1984 (age 42); Bergen County, New Jersey, U.S.
- Education: Rutgers University (BA)
- Occupations: Conservative filmmaker and activist
- Years active: 2006–present
- Organization(s): Project Veritas; Project Veritas Action; O'Keefe Media Group
- Known for: Activism
- Notable work: ACORN 2009 undercover videos controversy, Project Veritas videos

James Edward O'Keefe III (born June 28, 1984) is an American political activist who founded Project Veritas, a far-right (Note: Far-right...: Tumber, Howard; Waisbord, Silvio (March 24, 2021). The Routledge Companion to Media Disinformation and Populism. London, England: Routledge. ISBN 978-1-000-34678-7 – via Google Books. "False information can make movements defend the accuracy of their own claims and materials because of doubt sowed by countermovements and governments (Tufekci 2017). For instance, Project Veritas, an alt-right group, has a track record of attacking movements through misleading editing of videos and through fabricated 'sting' operations (Benkler et al. 2018)."; Coleman, Aidan J.; Janes, Katharine M. (July 26, 2021). "Caught on Tape: Establishing the Right of Third-Party Bystanders to Secretly Record the Police". Virginia Law Review. 107. Charlottesville, Virginia: University of Virginia School of Law: 168. "Project Veritas, a far-right non-profit organization whose methods have sparked controversy, brought a separate challenge to Section 99 that, on appeal, was consolidated with K. Eric Martin and Rene Perez's suit against the Suffolk County District Attorney."; Karbal, Ian W. (December 14, 2020). "The best journalism of 2020: Covering Trump". Columbia Journalism Review. Archived from the original on December 17, 2020. "Throughout his presidency, Trump has boosted far-right outlets with a loose relationship to truth, like Breitbart and One America News, into household names. Another such outlet, Project Veritas, apparently directed an employee to plant a false story in the Washington Post about a sexual encounter with Senate candidate Roy Moore. [...] However, careful reporting by Post journalists exposed the sting and revealed the deceitful tactics of far-right actors who brand themselves as journalists."; Covucci, David (January 14, 2020). "James O'Keefe claims Bernie Sanders will throw Trump fans in gulags". The Daily Dot. "O'Keefe is the head of Project Veritas, a far-right outlet that uses misleading edits and various forms of entrapment to try and catch Democrats, liberals, and media members in "shocking" statements."; Wilson, Jason (July 27, 2018). "What is 'shadow banning', and why did Trump tweet about it?". The Guardian. Archived from the original on November 9, 2020.; Seidman, Andrew; Terruso, Julia (January 5, 2021). "Congress is about to formalize Biden's win. Busloads of Pa. Trump supporters are heading to D.C. to protest". The Philadelphia Inquirer. Archived from the original on January 28, 2021. "...refers to posts on far-right websites like Project Veritas."; Reimann, Nicholas (November 10, 2020). "Texas Lt. Gov. Dan Patrick Offering Up To $1 Million For Evidence Of Voter Fraud". Forbes. Archived from the original on February 1, 2021. "The far-right conspiracy theory-driven group Project Veritas is offering rewards of $25,000 for tips relating to election fraud in Pennsylvania."; Olalde, Mark (December 4, 2020). "Climate Point: Climate change disrupts life from the Hopi Reservation to Louisiana". USA Today. Archived from the original on December 8, 2020. "the Mercer family, who are ardent supporters of President Donald Trump, have given vast sums of money to conservative causes and partly funded the far-right Project Veritas, which tries to secretly record and smear journalists, nonprofits and other targets."; Miao, Hannah (December 4, 2020). "New Jersey Gov. Phil Murphy slams New York Young Republican Club for hosting large, maskless gala in Jersey City amid Covid surge". CNBC. Archived from the original on December 8, 2020. "Featured attendees at the gala included keynote speaker James O'Keefe, founder of far-right group Project Veritas"; "US House race to watch: Lois Frankel vs Laura Loomer". Al Jazeera. October 31, 2020. "She previously worked undercover for Project Veritas, a far-right organization known for targeting leftists and anti-fascists."; Mathers, Matt (December 7, 2020). "AOC embroiled in fresh Twitter row with Marco Rubio over PPP loans". The Independent. "Project Veritas is a far-right activist group, which says it uses undercover techniques to reveal so-called liberal bias and corruption."; Foster, Ally (November 12, 2020). "Trump supporters plan massive protests". News.com.au. "His claims were publicized by Project Veritas, a far-right activist group"; Adler-Bell, Sam (May 23, 2018). "Prosecutors Withheld Evidence That Could Exonerate J20 Inauguration Protesters, Judge Rules". The Intercept. "The video of the planning meeting was provided to investigators by Project Veritas, a controversial far-right media group known for "sting" operations against its political opponents and the publication of selectively edited videos."; Min, Janice (March 22, 2021). "Pinterest and the Subtle Poison of Sexism and Racism in Silicon Valley". Time. "Later, Ozoma's cell-phone number and internal company emails appeared on extremist platforms including 4chan and 8chan following leaks by a white male colleague, a software developer, to Project Veritas, the far-right activist group founded by James O'Keefe. She received threats of rape and death."; Choi, Joseph (April 14, 2021). "Matt Gaetz makes six-figure ad buy targeting CNN amid sex trafficking allegations". The Hill. "The ad includes footage by the far-right activist group Project Veritas that shows a man identified as a CNN employee talking about news coverage of Gaetz, Politico reported. Project Veritas is known for publishing undercover sting footage that has been deceptively edited to reflect badly on organizations and people it disagrees with.") activist group that has used deceptively edited videos and information gathering techniques to attack mainstream media organizations and progressive groups. Both O'Keefe and Project Veritas have produced secretly recorded undercover audio and video encounters in academic, governmental, and social service organizations, purporting to show abusive or illegal behavior by representatives of those organizations; the recordings are often selectively edited to misrepresent the context of the conversations and the subjects' responses. (Note: Deceptive edits...: Tumber, Howard; Waisbord, Silvio (March 24, 2021). The Routledge Companion to Media Disinformation and Populism. Routledge. ISBN 978-1-000-34678-7. Archived from the original on April 4, 2021 – via Google Books. "False information can make movements defend the accuracy of their own claims and materials because of doubt sowed by countermovements and governments (Tufekci 2017). For instance, Project Veritas, an alt-right group, has a track record of attacking movements through misleading editing of videos and through fabricated 'sting' operations (Benkler et al. 2018)."; Karbal, Ian W. (December 14, 2020). "The best journalism of 2020: Covering Trump". Columbia Journalism Review. Archived from the original on December 17, 2020. "Throughout his presidency, Trump has boosted far-right outlets with a loose relationship to truth, like Breitbart and One America News, into household names. Another such outlet, Project Veritas, apparently directed an employee to plant a false story in the Washington Post about a sexual encounter with Senate candidate Roy Moore. [...] However, careful reporting by Post journalists exposed the sting and revealed the deceitful tactics of far-right actors who brand themselves as journalists."; Choi, Joseph (April 14, 2021). "Matt Gaetz makes six-figure ad buy targeting CNN amid sex trafficking allegations". The Hill. Archived from the original on April 18, 2021. "The ad includes footage by the far-right activist group Project Veritas that shows a man identified as a CNN employee talking about news coverage of Gaetz, Politico reported. Project Veritas is known for publishing undercover sting footage that has been deceptively edited to reflect badly on organizations and people it disagrees with."; Seidman, Andrew; Terruso, Julia (January 5, 2021). "Congress is about to formalize Biden's win. Busloads of Pa. Trump supporters are heading to D.C. to protest". The Philadelphia Inquirer. Archived from the original on January 28, 2021. "...refers to posts on far-right websites like Project Veritas."; Reimann, Nicholas (November 10, 2020). "Texas Lt. Gov. Dan Patrick Offering Up To $1 Million For Evidence Of Voter Fraud". Forbes. Archived from the original on February 1, 2021. "The far-right conspiracy theory-driven group Project Veritas is offering rewards of $25,000 for tips relating to election fraud in Pennsylvania."; Olalde, Mark (December 4, 2020). "Climate Point: Climate change disrupts life from the Hopi Reservation to Louisiana". USA Today. Archived from the original on December 8, 2020. "the Mercer family, who are ardent supporters of President Donald Trump, have given vast sums of money to conservative causes and partly funded the far-right Project Veritas, which tries to secretly record and smear journalists, nonprofits and other targets."; Goss, Brian Michael (March 12, 2018). "Veritable Flak Mill". Journalism Studies. 19 (4). Abingdon, England: Routledge: 548–563. doi:10.1080/1461670X.2017.1375388. ISSN 1461-670X. S2CID 149185981.; Elliott, Philip (June 1, 2017). "James O'Keefe's Targets Sue Undercover Filmmaker for $1 Million". Time. New York City: Time, Inc. Archived from the original on August 3, 2019.; "Trump suggests U.S. should sue Facebook and Google". Los Angeles Times. Los Angeles, California. June 26, 2019. Archived from the original on June 29, 2019.; Poniewozik, James (March 13, 2011). "The Twisty, Bent Truth of the NPR-Sting Video". Time. New York City: Time, Inc. Archived from the original on June 14, 2019.; Friedersdorf, Conor (March 8, 2013). "Andrew Breitbart and James O'Keefe Ruined Him, and Now He Gets $100,000". The Atlantic. Washington, D.C.: Emerson Collective. Archived from the original on August 30, 2019.; Bennett, W. Lance; Livingston, Steven (October 2020). "The Coordinated Attack on Authoritative Institutions". The Disinformation Age. Cambridge University Press. pp. 261–294. doi:10.1017/9781108914628.011. ISBN 978-1-108-91462-8. "In this case, Project Veritas was made to look foolish, just as it had in 2012 when it attempted a videotape sting operation against the voter registration group ACORN. In that instance, a judge even ordered James O'Keefe, Project Veritas's provocateur-in-chief, to pay $100,000 in damages to two ACORN employees. But rather than damaging O'Keefe and his organization, the ACORN scandal enamored him with the libertarian far-right."; Damann, Taylor (January 8, 2019). "Project Veritas and the Changing Face of Fake News". Gateway Journalism Review. 47 (351). Southern Illinois University Carbondale. ISSN 2158-7345. Archived from the original on April 26, 2021. "Project Veritas seems to only consider influencing political outcomes, though. O'Keefe's open pride in affecting the employment of several individuals in leadership for various liberal media outlets, his hand in influencing political elections, or even influencing public opinion on abortion are striking. Conducting guerrilla journalism that seeks to expose only liberals and Democrats is inherently ideological."; Perry, Tony (March 8, 2013). "Conservative activist James O'Keefe 'regrets any pain' to ACORN worker". Los Angeles Times. Los Angeles, California. Archived from the original on November 5, 2020.; Fund, John (September 21, 2009). "Acorn Who?". The Wall Street Journal. New York City: Dow Jones & Company. ISSN 0099-9660. Archived from the original on July 8, 2017.; Kroeger, Brooke (August 31, 2012). "Watchdog". Undercover Reporting: The Truth About Deception. Northwestern University Press. pp. 249–254. ISBN 978-0-8101-2619-0. JSTOR j.ctt22727sf.17. Archived from the original on December 6, 2020.) O'Keefe served as chairman until he was fired from the organization in February 2023.

O'Keefe first gained national attention for his selectively edited video recordings of workers at Association of Community Organizations for Reform Now (ACORN) offices in 2009, his arrest and misdemeanor guilty plea in 2010 for entering the federal office of then-U.S. senator Mary Landrieu (D-LA) under false pretenses, and the release of misleading videos of conversations with two high-ranking, now former, NPR executives in 2011.

When his videos – heavily edited to portray ACORN workers seemingly aiding a couple in criminal planning – were publicized, the U.S. Congress voted to freeze funds for the non-profit. The national controversy resulted in the non-profit also losing most of its private funding before investigations of the videos concluded no illegal activity occurred. In March 2010, ACORN was close to bankruptcy and had to close or rename most of its offices. Shortly thereafter, the California State Attorney General's Office and the US Government Accountability Office (GAO) released their related investigative reports. The Attorney General's Office found that O'Keefe had misrepresented the actions of ACORN workers in California and that the workers had not broken any laws. A preliminary probe by the GAO found that ACORN had managed its federal funds appropriately. One of the fired ACORN workers sued O'Keefe for invasion of privacy; O'Keefe issued an apology and agreed to pay $100,000 in a settlement.

O'Keefe has gained support from right-wing and conservative media and interest groups, as well as from the far right. In 2009, Andrew Breitbart commissioned him for the option to publish new videos exclusively on BigGovernment.

The Project Veritas board removed O'Keefe from leadership positions in February 2023 for what it said was financial malfeasance with donor money. On March 15, 2023, O'Keefe launched a new organization called O'Keefe Media Group. Project Veritas subsequently sued O'Keefe and two others, alleging that they had created the competing O'Keefe Media Group while still employees, approaching PV's donors and using company funds for this purpose. O'Keefe was also alleged to have improperly spent company funds on himself.

== Early life and education ==
James Edward O'Keefe III was born in Bergen County, New Jersey, the elder of two children of James, a materials engineer, and Deborah O'Keefe, a physical therapist. He has a younger sister.

O'Keefe grew up in Westwood, New Jersey. His home was politically "conservative but not rigidly so," according to his father. He graduated from Westwood Regional High School, where he showed an early interest in the arts, theater and journalism. He attained Eagle Scout, the highest rank in the Boy Scouts of America. O'Keefe started at Rutgers University in 2002 and majored in philosophy. Beginning in his sophomore year, he wrote a bi-weekly opinion column for The Daily Targum, the university's student paper. He left the Targum and founded the Rutgers Centurion, a conservative student paper supported by a $500 "Balance in the Media" grant from The Leadership Institute.

For his first video, he and other Centurion writers met with Rutgers dining staff to demand the banning of the cereal Lucky Charms from dining halls because of its offense to Irish Americans. O'Keefe said the leprechaun mascot presented a stereotype. He intended to have officials lose either way: to appear insensitive to an ethnic group, or to look silly by agreeing to ban Lucky Charms. They expected to be thrown out of school, but the Rutgers official was courteous, took notes, and said their concerns would be considered. Rutgers staff say the cereal was never taken off the menu.

== Career ==
After graduating from Rutgers, O'Keefe worked for a year at the Leadership Institute (LI) in Arlington, Virginia, under media specialist Ben Wetmore, whom O'Keefe calls his mentor. The institute sent him to colleges to train students to start conservative independent newspapers, but, after a year LI officials asked him to leave. According to LI president and founder Morton Blackwell, O'Keefe was "very effective and very enthusiastic" but after a year he was asked to leave because officials felt his activist work threatened the group's nonprofit status by trying to influence legislation.

O'Keefe has produced and distributed secretly recorded and misleadingly edited videos and audio files made during staged encounters with targeted entities or individuals. His work takes the form of undercover stings targeted at liberal groups and politicians. He sought to "embarrass" and "damage" his targets, such as Landrieu and ACORN.

He has sought to maximize publicity by releasing secretly recorded videos over several days or months, often in relation to funding authorizations or significant political actions related to the subject organization. Many videos received widespread media coverage sparking significant reactions, most notably videos of ACORN that resulted in the Congress quickly freezing funds, two executive agencies canceling contracts, and several ACORN workers being fired, and videos of National Public Radio (NPR) executives that led to the resignation of CEO Vivian Schiller, shortly before Congressional funding hearings involving NPR.

In January 2010, O'Keefe began a column on Breitbart's website, BigGovernment. Andrew Breitbart stated in an interview that he paid O'Keefe a salary for his "life rights" to gain release of O'Keefe's videos first on his website. In 2010, O'Keefe formed a new organization, Project Veritas, whose stated mission is "to investigate and expose corruption, dishonesty, self-dealing, waste, fraud, and other misconduct in both public and private institutions in order to achieve a more ethical and transparent society."

Much of the funding for Project Veritas comes from anonymous donations through Donors Trust, a conservative, American nonprofit donor-advised fund, which according to its promotional materials, says that it will "keep your charitable giving private, especially gifts funding sensitive or controversial issues." Prominent donors include the Trump Foundation, which, in May 2015, donated $10,000.

O'Keefe is a conservative activist with mainstream conservative pro-market and anti-government views, although he has described himself as a "progressive radical", because he wants to change things, "not conserve them". He considers himself a muckraker. O'Keefe has expressed admiration for the philosophy of G. K. Chesterton and for a free press.

== Major activities ==
=== Planned Parenthood recordings (2008) ===
In 2006, O'Keefe met Lila Rose, the founder of an anti-abortion group on the University of California, Los Angeles (UCLA) campus. They secretly recorded encounters in Planned Parenthood clinics in Los Angeles and Santa Monica, in which Rose posed as a 15-year-old girl impregnated by a 23-year-old male. Rose and O'Keefe made two videos incorporating heavily edited versions of the recordings and released them on YouTube. the video omitted the portions of the full conversation in which a Planned Parenthood employee asked Rose to consult her mother about the pregnancy and another employee told Rose, "We have to follow the laws". Rose took down the videos after Planned Parenthood sent her a cease and desist letter in May 2007 asserting that the videos violated California's voice recording laws, which required consent from all recorded parties.

In 2007, O'Keefe phoned several Planned Parenthood clinics and secretly recorded the conversations. He posed as a donor, asking if his donations would be applied to needs of minority women, accompanied by race-related remarks such as "there's way too many black people in Ohio". The recordings portrayed Planned Parenthood clinic workers in six states agreeing to accept his donation under his conditions. After the release of the recordings, African-American leaders called for withdrawal of public financing of the organization. The Idaho clinic responded with an apology for "the manner in which this offensive call was handled". Planned Parenthood issued an official statement emphasizing that "97 percent of its services are focused on providing contraceptives, breast and cervical cancer screenings and sexually transmitted disease testing and treatment — not abortions".

=== ACORN videos (2009) ===
In September 2009, O'Keefe and his associate, Hannah Giles, published edited hidden camera recordings in which Giles posed as a prostitute and O'Keefe as her boyfriend, a law student, in an attempt to elicit damaging responses from employees of the Association of Community Organizations for Reform Now (ACORN), an advocacy organization for people of low and moderate income.

Washington Post correspondents Darryl Fears and Carol D. Leonnig reported that O'Keefe "said he targeted ACORN for the same reasons that the political right does: its massive voter registration drives" and that "[p]oliticians are getting elected single-handedly due to this organization." According to The Washington Post, ACORN registered people mostly from the Latino and African American groups.

The videos were recorded during the summer of 2009 and appeared to show low-level ACORN employees in six cities providing advice to Giles and O'Keefe on how to avoid detection by authorities of tax evasion, human smuggling and child prostitution. He framed the undercover recordings with a preface of him dressed in a "pimp" outfit, which he also wore in TV media interviews. This gave viewers, including the media, the impression that he had dressed that way when speaking to ACORN workers. However, he actually entered the ACORN offices in conservative street clothes (the sleeve of his dress shirt is visible on camera). ACORN employees at two of the six offices visited by O'Keefe and Giles reported his activities to the police after he left. O'Keefe selectively edited and manipulated his recordings of ACORN employees, and distorted the chronology of events. Several journalists and media outlets have expressed regret for not properly scrutinizing and vetting his work.

==== Reception and lawsuit ====
After the videos were released through the fall of 2009, the U.S. Congress quickly voted to freeze federal funding to ACORN. The Census Bureau and the IRS terminated their contract relationships with ACORN. By December 2009, an external investigation of ACORN was published which cleared the organization of any illegality, while noting that its poor management practices contributed to unprofessional actions by some low-level employees. In March 2010, ACORN announced it would dissolve due to loss of funding from government and especially private sources.

On March 1, 2010, Brooklyn District Attorney Charles J. Hynes found there was no criminal wrongdoing by the ACORN staff in New York.

The California Attorney General's Office granted O'Keefe and Giles limited immunity from prosecution in exchange for providing the full, unedited videotapes related to ACORN offices in California. On the basis of the edited videotape which O'Keefe released, Vera appeared to be a willing participant in helping with O'Keefe's plan to smuggle young women into the United States illegally. However, authorities confirmed that Vera immediately contacted them about O'Keefe and that he had also encouraged O'Keefe to share as much information as possible about his scheme and gather further evidence of O'Keefe's purported illegal activities, which could then be used by prosecutors to bring charges against O'Keefe for attempted human trafficking. Due to O'Keefe's release of the dubiously edited video, intentionally designed to "prove" that ACORN employees were ready and willing to engage in illicit activities, Vera lost his job and was falsely accused of being engaged in human trafficking. O'Keefe said that he "regrets any pain" caused by his actions, though O'Keefe's lawyer dismissed any claimed injury incurred by Vera and stated that the payment was a "nuisance settlement".

O'Keefe moved for summary judgment in his favor, arguing that the plaintiff had no reasonable expectation that the conversation would be private. In August 2012, the federal judge hearing the case denied O'Keefe's motion for summary judgment. The judge ruled that O'Keefe had "misled plaintiff to believe that the conversation would remain confidential by posing as a client seeking services from ACORN and asking whether their conversation was confidential." On March 5, 2013, O'Keefe agreed to pay $100,000 to former California ACORN employee Juan Carlos Vera for breaking state law prohibiting surreptitious recording, and acknowledged in the settlement that at the time he published his video he was unaware that Vera had notified the police about the incident. The settlement contained the following apology: "O'Keefe regrets any pain suffered by Mr. Vera or his family."

On June 14, 2010, the U.S. Government Accountability Office (GAO) published its report finding no evidence that ACORN, or any of its related organizations, had mishandled any of the $40 million in federal money which they had received in recent years.

=== Senator Mary Landrieu (2010) ===
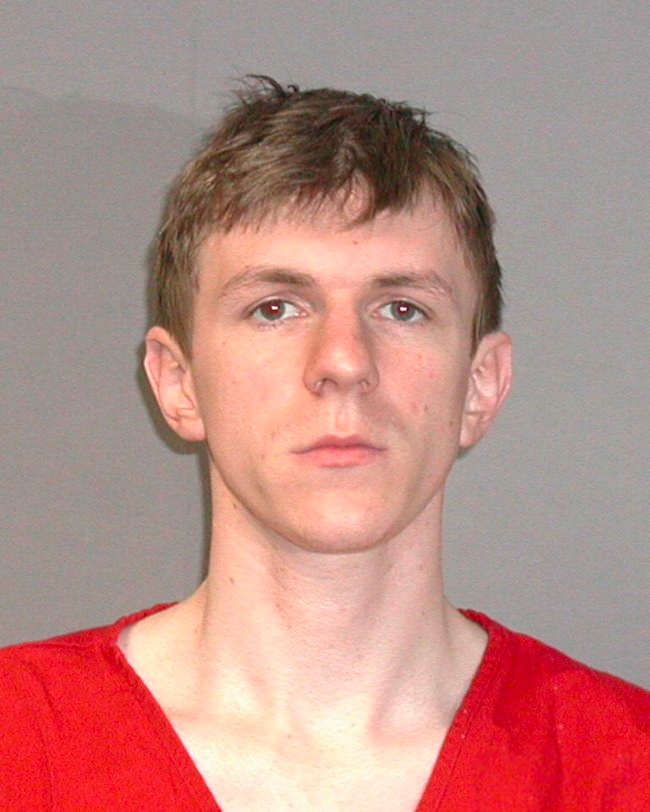
U.S. Marshal Service mugshot of O'Keefe, following his 2010 arrest for entering a federal building under false pretenses

O'Keefe and colleagues were arrested in the Hale Boggs Federal Complex in New Orleans in January 2010 and charged with entering federal property under false pretenses with the intent of committing a felony, at the office of United States Senator Mary Landrieu, a Democrat. His three fellow activists, who were dressed as telephone repairmen when apprehended, included Robert Flanagan, the son of William Flanagan, acting U.S. Attorney of the Eastern District of Louisiana. The four men were charged with malicious intent to damage the phone system. O'Keefe stated that he had entered Landrieu's office to investigate complaints that she was ignoring phone calls from constituents during the debate over President Barack Obama's health care bill.

The charges in the case were reduced from a felony to a single misdemeanor count of entering a federal building under false pretenses. O'Keefe and the others pleaded guilty on May 26. O'Keefe was sentenced to three years' probation, 100 hours of community service and a $1,500 fine. The three other men received lesser sentences. Another consequence is that O'Keefe is barred from soliciting donations from Florida residents, because of state law applicable to people found guilty of fraud.

In August 2013, O'Keefe revisited the incident by releasing a video entitled: "a confrontation with former U.S. Attorney Jim Letten on the campus of Tulane University". Letten is a former Republican U.S. Attorney who recused himself from the Landrieu incident because he knew the father of one of the men involved. The video shows Letten accusing O'Keefe of "terrorizing" Letten's wife at their home, of harassing him, and trespassing on the Tulane campus. He called O'Keefe a "coward" and a "spud", and referred to O'Keefe and his companions as "hobbits" and "scum".

=== NPR video (2011) ===
On March 8, 2011, shortly before the US Congress was to vote on funding for National Public Radio (NPR), O'Keefe released a heavily edited video of a discussion with Ronald Schiller, NPR's senior vice president for fundraising, and associate Betsy Liley. Raw content was secretly recorded by O'Keefe's partners Ken Larrey and Shaughn Adeleye.

NPR responded by stating that Schiller's remarks were presented out of sequence and that he said that he would speak personally, and not for NPR. Schiller said some highly placed Republicans believed the Republican Party had been hijacked by a radical group (the Tea Party) that they characterized as "Islamophobic" and "seriously racist, racist people", and while Schiller did not disagree, according to NPR, O'Keefe's editing made it appear those were Schiller's opinions. Schiller then says that unlike establishment Republicans, the growing Tea Party movement in the party "is fanatically involved in people's personal lives and very fundamental Christian — I wouldn't even call it Christian. It's this weird evangelical kind of move. [sic]"

Later in the edited video, Schiller seems to say he believes NPR "would be better off in the long run without federal funding", explaining that removal of federal funding would allow NPR more independence and remove the widely held misconception that NPR is significantly funded by the public. But on the raw tape, Schiller also said that withdrawing federal funding would cause local stations to go under and that NPR is doing "everything we can" to keep it.

In a statement released before analysis of the longer raw video, NPR said, "Schiller's comments are in direct conflict with NPR's official position ... The fraudulent organization represented in this video repeatedly pressed us to accept a $5 million check with no strings attached, which we repeatedly refused to accept." After reviewing the unedited video, Scott Baker, editor-in-chief of TheBlaze, said the NPR executives "seem to be fairly balanced people."

Journalists Ben Smith, James Poniewozik, and David Weigel have expressed regret for giving O'Keefe's NPR videos wider circulation without scrutinizing them for themselves.

==== Reception ====
Comparison of the raw video with the released one revealed editing that was characterized as "selective" and "deceptive" by Michael Gerson, opinion writer for The Washington Post, who wrote, "O'Keefe did not merely leave a false impression; he manufactured an elaborate, alluring lie." Time magazine wrote that the video "transposed remarks from a different part of the meeting", was "manipulative" and "a partisan hit-job."

The raw video shows Schiller told the two men "that donors cannot expect to influence news coverage." On the longer tape, he says, "There is such a big firewall between funding and reporting: Reporters will not be swayed in any way, shape or form." Broadcast journalist Al Tompkins, who now teaches at the Poynter Institute, noted that Ron Schiller was a fundraiser, not an official affecting the newsroom. He commented on the raw tape: "The message that he said most often—I counted six times: He told these two people that he had never met before that you cannot buy coverage", Tompkins said. "He says it over and over and over again."

On March 17, Martha T. Moore of USA Today reported: "According to The Blaze analysis, Ron Schiller's most inflammatory remarks, that Tea Party members are 'seriously racist', were made as he was recounting the views of Republicans he has spoken with—although he does not appear to disagree. It also shows Schiller appearing to laugh about the potential spread of Islamic Sharia law, when the longer version shows he laughed in reaction to something completely different."

Two days later, O'Keefe released a video in which Betsy Liley, senior director of institutional giving at NPR, appeared to have checked with senior management and said MEAC was cleared to make donations anonymously and NPR could help shield donations from government audits, but added that, in order to proceed, additional background information would be required, including an IRS Form 990. Liley advised the caller that NPR executives would investigate them before accepting any large donation, examining tax records and checking out other organizations that have received donations from them. Liley raises the possibility of NPR's turning down substantial gifts and stresses the "firewall" between the revenue-generating part of NPR and its news operation. NPR put Liley on administrative leave. In emails released following the publication of the Liley video, NPR confirmed that the official had consulted appropriately with top management and notified the purported donors of problems with their desired method of donation.

The video, which was released directly before a congressional vote on funding, caused immediate reaction from NPR critics in Congress. Ronald Schiller, who had already submitted his resignation in January so that he could join the Aspen Institute, moved up his resignation after the video release when NPR put him on administrative leave. NPR CEO Vivian Schiller (no relation to Ronald Schiller), who had not been implicated in the Project Veritas video, quickly resigned. Vivian Schiller's resignation, mutually decided with the NPR board, was in part an attempt to show Congressional funders that NPR could hold itself accountable.

=== U.S. presidential elections (2016) ===
A month before the launch of Donald Trump's presidential campaign, the Trump Foundation donated $10,000 to O'Keefe's Project Veritas. O'Keefe attended, as a guest of the Trump campaign, the final presidential debate, and was later available in the spin room following the Las Vegas event.

On November 8, 2016 (Election Day), O'Keefe spent some time following vans that were allegedly "bussing people around to polls in Philadelphia".

On January 9, 2017, Project Veritas operative Allison Maass was filmed attempting to bribe members of Americans Take Action into inciting a riot at Trump's inauguration. On January 16, 2017, Project Veritas uploaded a video showing DC Antifascist Coalition members of Disrupt J20 plotting to use "stink bombs" at the DeploraBall. After the video's release, Disrupt J20 denied the statements, saying that the members deliberately gave false information to Veritas. The video led to the arrest of one man allegedly involved in the plan, as well as two associates. All three individuals pleaded guilty.

==== Americans United for Change videos ====
On October 18, 2016, O'Keefe released a series of videos on Project Veritas' YouTube channel titled "Rigging the Election" that apparently showed former national field director Scott Foval of Americans United for Change discussing ensuring that they have people at the front of the rope lines at rallies in order to ask questions, a common practice known as "bird dogging". The accuracy of the videos has been questioned for possibly omitting context, and the unedited raw footage has not been made available. The Republican Attorney General of Wisconsin, Brad Schimel, investigated the claims made in the video twice, both times finding no evidence that Foval broke any voting laws.

Scott Foval was fired by Americans United for Change after the first video was released. Foval later said he had been set up. Robert Creamer, a DNC consultant and husband of U.S. Representative Jan Schakowsky, D-IL, said, "We regret the unprofessional and careless hypothetical conversations that were captured on hidden cameras of a regional contractor for our firm, and he is no longer working with us," he said. "While none of the schemes described in the conversations ever took place, these conversations do not at all reflect the values of Democracy Partners." Shortly afterwards, Creamer, who was also featured in the video, said he would end his consulting arrangement with the DNC to avoid becoming a "distraction".

Following the publication of his videos, O'Keefe filed a complaint with the Federal Election Commission (FEC) against the presidential campaign of Hillary Clinton and the DNC, alleging "a criminal conspiracy" involving the Clinton campaign, the DNC and three left-leaning super PACs. On June 1, 2017, Creamer's firm, Democracy Partners, filed a $1 million lawsuit against Project Veritas, claiming Project Veritas had lied to gain access to the firm and violating anti-wiretapping laws.

In response to a third video, in which O'Keefe stated that Clinton was behind an illegal public relations gimmick to punish Trump for not releasing his tax returns, the Clinton campaign denied any wrongdoing. Independent campaign finance experts posited the video doesn't support O'Keefe's claims. Clinton said she was aware of the activists dressed as Donald Duck, who were following Trump while asking about his tax returns, and said she was amused.

On October 26, 2016, O'Keefe posted a fourth video on his Project Veritas Action YouTube channel. The video alleged that liberal groups supporting Hillary Clinton were illegally taking foreign money. The targeted group, Americans United for Change foundation, is a 501(c)4 organization and is allowed to legally accept foreign contributions. However, AUC returned the money shortly after the video was released. The group's chief stated, "We returned the money because the last thing we want to be associated with is a character like O'Keefe who has been convicted and successfully sued for his illegal tactics and fraudulent activities."

In 2019, a federal judge dismissed a slander lawsuit involving the Foval videos, ruling that the videos taken of Scott Foval over several months showed that there was not a preconceived story line and that the videos were protected by the First Amendment.

Democracy Partners is a political consulting firm run by Robert Creamer. It and related plaintiffs sued O'Keefe, Project Veritas, and Project Veritas employee Allison Maass over how the footage was obtained. They alleged fraud and violations of federal and D.C. wiretapping law. In 2022 a jury in the United States District Court for the District of Columbia awarded $120,000 in damages on the fraud claim and the parties agreed to another $10,000 in wiretapping damages. In August 2026 the United States Court of Appeals for the District of Columbia Circuit reversed. The court said no reasonable jury could find that Maass owed Democracy Partners a fiduciary duty. It also said the damages award could not stand because Creamer's businesses lost contracts from the published video, not from Maass's undercover access.

== Other activities ==
=== Abbie Boudreau (2010) ===
In August 2010, O'Keefe planned a staged encounter with CNN correspondent Abbie Boudreau, who was working on a documentary on the young conservative movement. He set up an appointment at his office in Maryland to discuss a video shoot. Izzy Santa, executive director of Project Veritas, warned Boudreau that O'Keefe was planning to "punk" her on the boat by trying to seduce her—which he would film on hidden cameras. Boudreau did not board the boat and soon left the area.

CNN later published a 13-page plan written by O'Keefe mentor Ben Wetmore. It listed props for the boat scheme, including pornography, sexual aids, condoms, a blindfold and "fuzzy" handcuffs. When questioned by CNN, O'Keefe denied he was going to follow the Wetmore plan, as he found parts of it inappropriate. Boudreau commented "that does not appear to be true, according to a series of emails we obtained from Izzy Santa, who says the e-mails reveal James' true intentions."

Following the Boudreau incident, Project Veritas paid Izzy Santa a five-figure settlement after she threatened to sue, which included a non-disclosure agreement. Funding decreased from conservative political organizations following this CNN incident.

=== New Jersey Teachers' Union video (2010) ===
Starting October 25, 2010, O'Keefe posted a series of videos on the Internet entitled Teachers Unions Gone Wild. At the time, the New Jersey Education Association (NJEA) was in negotiations with Chris Christie, the New Jersey governor, over teacher pay benefits and tenure. O'Keefe obtained one video from recordings made by "citizen journalists", whom he recruited to attend the NJEA's leadership conference. They secretly recorded meetings and conversations with teacher participants. It featured teachers discussing the difficulty of firing a tenured teacher.

A second video featured a staged phone conversation by O'Keefe with Lawrence E. Everett, assistant superintendent of the Passaic, New Jersey city schools, in which Everett refused to commit to firing a teacher based upon the purported claim by a parent that the teacher had used the "n-word" with his child. The third video (October 26, 2010) featured audio of a voice, identified as NJEA Associate Director Wayne Dibofsky, who alleged voter fraud during the 1997 Jersey City mayoral election. The voice of Robert Byrne, Jersey City municipal clerk, was recorded on the same video; he noted that the election was monitored by lawyers for both candidates.

New Jersey's Republican Governor Chris Christie stated at the time that nothing on the videos surprised him. NJEA spokesman Steve Wollmer said the union and its attorneys were discussing their options regarding possible legal action, although no action was ever taken. Wollmer called the videos "a calculated attack on this organization and its members", and described O'Keefe as "flat-out sleazy".

=== Medicaid videos (2011) ===
In the summer of 2011, O'Keefe released videos of his colleagues' staged encounters purportedly showing Medicaid fraud in offices in six states, including Maine, North Carolina, Ohio, South Carolina, and Virginia. Following his previous strategy, he sent the releases to conservative outlets over a period of weeks. In July 2011, two conservative groups released a secretly recorded video of an encounter in Maine's Department of Health and Human Services.

In the video, an actor attempted to apply for benefits while hinting that he was a drug smuggler. Americans for Prosperity and O'Keefe said he had similar recorded videos from offices in Ohio, Virginia and South Carolina, and believed that there was a systemic problem. In Maine, Governor Paul LePage concluded upon further examination of the videos that there was no fraud or intent to commit fraud.

A similar O'Keefe video posted on the Project Veritas web site purported to show workers at the Ohio Department of Job and Family Services assisting actors posing as drug dealers in applying for benefits. His fourth Medicaid video, apparently filmed in Richmond, Virginia, was released in July 2011. The New York Times reported: "[As 'Sean Murphy'], dressed in the same regalia he wore on the New Jersey shoot, [O'Keefe] presented himself to a Medicaid worker in Charleston, South Carolina, as an Irish drug importer and Irish Republican Army member who wanted coverage for 25 wounded comrades who entered the U.S. illegally. The kindly worker spent time photocopying applications and dealing with this improbable applicant." She explained to him that only U.S. citizens are eligible for Medicaid and informed him she was not making any promises that the 25 purported IRA members would qualify. She said he had to abide by the law and told him that she didn't want to know details, because federal law protects patient privacy: "Like I said, someone would have to come here and subpoena our information in order for us to divulge any information, because like I said there's something called the Health Insurance Accountability and Affordability Act—or portability—and anyway it went into effect several years ago, and that's what we follow. It is federal law, and they do threaten high fines—which they don't pay me as much per year as they threaten to fine me—so it is definitely not in my own best interest to divulge anything to anyone because I cannot afford it, I do not want to go to jail."

==== Reception ====
The videos received less media attention than earlier O'Keefe efforts. Generally, the state officials and representatives acknowledged potential problems but also took a measured tone in response, to allow time to fully investigate and evaluate the incidents. After viewing the video, Governor LePage thanked the individual who took the video and noted: "The video in its entirety does not show a person willfully helping someone de-fraud the welfare system. It does show a need for further job knowledge and continuous and improved staff training." He also stated that "we would be six months further along in fixing the problem" if he had received the video when it was filmed. LePage directed his agency director to work on correcting the problem.

Ohio media initially reported that "a Franklin County Jobs and Family Service worker was placed on administrative leave and at least one other person was out of work" as a result of the video's release. Ben Johnson of the Ohio Department of Job and Family Services noted that benefits were never granted in the case, and that the made-up story would have been caught if the application process had proceeded. He said his office would use the video to strengthen staff training. Mike DeWine, Attorney General of Ohio, described the Ohio video as "outrageous" and intended to instruct his state's Medicaid fraud unit to look into the incident. The director of the Ohio Department of Job and Family Services, Michael Colbert, notified county leaders of a mandatory retraining, "to ensure they can identify people trying to defraud the government". Upon investigation by state officials, the Medicaid worker who coached O'Keefe's operative seeking Medicaid for his father and claimed to own a yacht as well as a helipad, on how to hide their (also claimed) ownership of an $800,000 automobile had been placed on paid administrative leave. A spokesman for Virginia governor Bob McDonnell said that he had asked state police to review the video and take whatever actions are appropriate.

In Charleston, South Carolina, the director of that state's Department of Health and Human Services, Anthony Kreck, said the video filmed in his state "raises concerns about how well trained and supported our staff are to handle outrageous situations." He also expressed concern for the safety of the state employee with the figure ["Sean Murphy"] in the video "who could be interpreted as intimidating" and questioned why security wasn't called.

=== New Hampshire primary video (2012) ===
In January 2012, O'Keefe released a video of associates obtaining a number of ballots for the New Hampshire Primary by using the names of recently deceased voters. He stated that the video showed "the integrity of the elections process is severely comprised [sic]." His team culled names from published obituaries, which were checked against public voter roll information. O'Keefe said his team broke no laws, as they did not pretend to be the deceased persons when they asked for the ballots, and they did not cast votes after receiving ballots. One of his associates' attempts was caught by a voting supervisor at the polling station who recognized that the name he gave was of a deceased individual; the associate in question left before police arrived.

==== Reception ====
Sarah Parnass of ABC News reported that the video "either exposes why voting laws are too lax or comes close to itself being voter fraud (or both)". One media account referred to it as a stunt. New Hampshire Governor John Lynch said, "I think it is outrageous that we have out-of-staters coming into New Hampshire, coming into our polling places and misrepresenting themselves to the election officials, and I hope that they should be prosecuted to the fullest extent of the law, if in fact they're found guilty of some criminal act." The New Hampshire Attorney General and the US Attorney's Office announced investigations into the video.

New Hampshire Associate Attorney General Richard Head said he would investigate the possible weaknesses in the voting system, but noted the state did not have a history of known fraud related to person[s] seeking ballot[s] in the name of a dead person or persons. Head announced he would investigate the possibility that the filmmakers committed crimes while producing the videos.

Hamline University law professor David Schultz said, "If they [O'Keefe's group] were intentionally going in and trying to fraudulently obtain a ballot, they violated the law", referring to Title 42, which prohibits procuring ballots fraudulently. The New Hampshire Attorney General's office later dropped its investigation of O'Keefe for potential voter fraud in 2013.

=== Patrick Moran (2012) ===
On October 24, 2012, a video was released showing Patrick Moran, son of then-U.S. Congressman Jim Moran (D-VA), and a field director with his father's campaign, discussing a plan to cast fraudulent ballots, which was proposed to him by someone who posed as a fervent supporter of the campaign. The person he was speaking with was a conservative activist with O'Keefe's Project Veritas, and was secretly recording the conversation. Patrick Moran resigned from the campaign, saying he did not want to be a distraction during the election, stating:

[A]t no point have I, or will I ever endorse any sort of illegal or unethical behavior. At no point did I take this person seriously. He struck me as being unstable and joking, and for only that reason did I humor him. In hindsight, I should have immediately walked away, making it clear that there is no place in the electoral process for even the suggestion of illegal behavior, joking or not.

The Arlington County, Virginia Police Department was made aware of the video and opened a criminal investigation into "every component" of the matter.

On January 31, 2013, Arlington County announced that the investigation, by its police department in collaboration with the Offices of the Virginia Attorney General and the Arlington County Commonwealth's Attorney, had concluded and that no charges would be brought. The County stated: "Patrick Moran and the Jim Moran for Congress campaign provided full cooperation throughout the investigation. Despite repeated attempts to involve the party responsible for producing the video, they failed to provide any assistance."

=== US–Mexico border-crossing (2014) ===
In August 2014, O'Keefe dressed up as Osama bin Laden (who had died 3 years previously) and crossed the US–Mexico border in Texas in both directions to "show that our elected officials were lying to the American people" about border security. The incident was cited by U.S. Senator John McCain in Congressional hearings.

=== Colorado mail-in ballots (2014) ===
In October 2014 in Colorado, O'Keefe and collaborators from Project Veritas in disguise, approached numerous Democratic campaigns and political organizations in Colorado to mishandle or fraudulently cast mail-in ballots. A 2013 state law had mandated that all voters receive mail-in ballots. A number of targeted individuals resisted the bait, some of them having identified the imposters. Staffers from progressive organization New Era Colorado began photographing O'Keefe's group and later claimed to have contacted police. PV video shows a few individuals agreeing with the illegal activities and offering suggestions. No evidence of illegal activity was shown.

=== Attempted sting of Open Society Foundations (2016) ===
On March 16, 2016, O'Keefe attempted to call Open Society Foundations under the assumed name of "Victor Kesh", describing himself as attached to "a, uh, foundation" [sic] seeking to "get involved with you and aid what you do in fighting for, um, European values." [sic] O'Keefe forgot to hang up after recording the voicemail, and several more minutes of audio were recorded, revealing that he was attached to Discover the Networks and planning a series of attempts to create embarrassing videos or other recordings of targeted groups.

=== CNN undercover videos (2017) ===
On June 26, 2017, O'Keefe released a video on the YouTube channel of Project Veritas that showed John Bonifield, a producer of health and medical stories for CNN, saying CNN's coverage of the Russia investigation was "Because it's ratings" and that the coverage was "mostly bullshit". The video identified Bonifield as a supervising producer for CNN but not specifically for CNN Health. CNN said it was standing by "our medical producer John Bonifield. Diversity of personal opinion is what makes CNN strong". During a White House press briefing, deputy White House press secretary Sarah Huckabee Sanders said of the video "whether it's accurate or not, I don't know, but I would encourage everybody ... across the country to take a look at it".

On June 28, 2017, O'Keefe released the second part of the series of undercover videos, by then dubbed "American Pravda". In the video, CNN anchor Van Jones said, "The Russia thing is just a big nothingburger." When asked about the video in an email, CNN responded "lol". During that same day, the videos were posted on Donald Trump's Instagram account. Jones said that O'Keefe had deceptively edited the video to take his remarks out of context and was attempting to "pull off a hoax." Jones added that he believed that there probably was collusion between the Trump campaign and the Russian government.

On June 30, 2017, O'Keefe released the third part of the undercover videos. Part 3 of the series showed CNN associate producer Jimmy Carr saying that Trump is "fucking crazy" and that "on the inside, we all recognize he is a clown, that he is hilariously unqualified for this, he's really bad at this, and that he does not have America's best interests". Carr also said "This is a man who's not actually a Republican, he just adopted that because that was the party he thought he could win in. He doesn't believe anything that these people believe." Additionally, he said American voters are "stupid as shit." He also made comments about Counselor to the President Kellyanne Conway, calling her an "awful woman" and stating that she "looks like she got hit with a shovel". In a fourth video published by Project Veritas on July 5, Carr criticized CNN co-anchor Chris Cuomo.

=== Failed attempt to sting The Washington Post (2017) ===
Starting in July 2017, Project Veritas operative Jaime Phillips attempted to infiltrate The Washington Post and other media outlets by joining networking groups related to journalism and left-leaning politics. She and a male companion attended events related to the Post, and their conversations with journalists were sometimes covertly recorded.

In November 2017, The Washington Post reported that several women accused Republican Alabama U.S. Senate candidate Roy Moore of pursuing them while they were teenagers and he was in his 30s. Later that same month, Jaime Phillips approached The Washington Post and falsely claimed that Moore had impregnated her as a teenager and that she had an abortion. In conducting its usual fact-checking, the Post discovered multiple red flags in her story. They found a GoFundMe page in her name that said, "I've accepted a job to work in the conservative media movement to combat the lies and deceipt [sic] of the liberal MSM." After a Post reporter confronted her with the inconsistencies during a video-recorded interview, Phillips denied that she was working with an organization that targets journalists, and said that she no longer wanted to do the story. She was seen outside Project Veritas' office in Mamaroneck, New York, with her car remaining at the office's parking lot for more than an hour. O'Keefe declined to comment about the woman's apparent connection to Project Veritas. Instead of running a story about Phillips' supposed pregnancy, the Post published an article about the attempted sting operation. The Post decided to disclose Phillips' original discussions made off the record, saying they were not obligated to keep them confidential because she had deceived them.

Hours after the Post published this story, O'Keefe released a video which he claimed exposed the newspaper's liberal bias. The video includes undercover footage of conversations with two Post employees, national security reporter Dan Lamothe and product director Joey Marburger. These employees explained to undercover Project Veritas operatives the difference between the news reporting of The Washington Post (which calls out the Trump administration's missteps while giving "him credit where there's credit" due) and the Post's opinion editorials; O'Keefe said that this exposed the Washington Post's "hidden agenda."

Rod Dreher of The American Conservative praised the Washington Post and called on conservative donors to stop giving money to O'Keefe's outfit. Dan McLaughlin of the conservative National Review said that O'Keefe's sting was an "own goal" and that O'Keefe was doing a disservice to the conservative movement; Jim Geraghty of the National Review made a similar assessment. Byron York of The Washington Examiner said that O'Keefe's "idiocy" was "beyond boneheaded," and that "O'Keefe really ought to hang it up." Ben Shapiro, the conservative editor in chief of The Daily Wire, said that the botched sting was "horrible, both morally and effectively." Conor Friedersdorf of The Atlantic wrote, "If James O'Keefe respected the right-wing populists who make up the audience of Project Veritas ... he would tell them the truth about all of the organizations that he targets. Instead, Project Veritas operates in bad faith, an attribute it demonstrated again this week in the aftermath of its bungled attempt to trick The Washington Post." Noah Rothman of the conservative magazine Commentary chastised O'Keefe for being exploitative of his audience: "No longer are institutions like Veritas dedicated to combating ignorance in their audience. They're actively courting it."

Jonathan Chait of New York magazine said that O'Keefe, having set out prove that the Post was fake news, ended up disproving it. O'Keefe's plot collapsed because it was premised on a ludicrously false worldview, wrote Chait. "The Washington Post does not, in fact, publish unverified accusations just because they're against Republicans." O'Keefe's attempts to prove rampant voter fraud have failed "because voter fraud is not rampant."

=== New Jersey Education Association videos (2018) ===
On May 2, 2018, Project Veritas posted on YouTube a video allegedly showing a union administrator from the New Jersey Education Association, a teachers union, discussing a teacher alleged to have struck a student. The following day, O'Keefe released a second video allegedly showing another union administrator speaking to students about a different alleged incident of a teacher pushing and injuring a student. In the video, the administrator allegedly boasted of her effort to retain a pension for a teacher who allegedly had sex with a student. Both teachers were suspended pending an investigation, and resigned from their union roles after the release of the videos. During a New Jersey Senate meeting on May 31, the New Jersey Education Association announced that a law firm would investigate the incidents.

=== Defamation against postmaster (2020) ===
In 2024 O'Keefe and Project Veritas settled a lawsuit against them for defamation, brought by the postmaster of Erie, Pennsylvania.

O'Keefe and Project Veritas had alleged improprieties in Post Office handling of mail-in ballots during the November 2020 election. Subsequent investigation by the Postal Service Inspector General found no evidence to support the claim.

Project Veritas continued to promote the claims of fraud after they had been discredited. The postmaster sued Project Veritas and O'Keefe for defamation in 2021. In the 2024 settlement, O'Keefe admitted in a statement that he was "aware of no evidence or other allegation that election fraud occurred in the Erie Post Office during the 2020 Presidential Election."

=== Twitter suspension (2021) ===
On April 15, 2021, O'Keefe was suspended from Twitter for "operating fake accounts". On April 19, he filed a lawsuit against Twitter in state court in Westchester County, New York, claiming that Twitter's reason for suspending him is "false and defamatory".

=== FBI search warrants and allegedly stolen Biden diary (2021) ===
On November 6, 2021, the Federal Bureau of Investigation (FBI) executed an early morning court-ordered search of O'Keefe's apartment in Mamaroneck, New York two days after searching the homes of two of O'Keefe's associates in connection with the alleged theft of a diary belonging to President Biden's daughter, Ashley Biden, in 2020. Excerpts from the diary were posted two weeks before the 2020 US presidential election, which includes Ashley Biden stating that President Biden had inappropriate showers with her when she was a child.

In a statement, the Committee to Protect Journalists expressed concern that lacking "a clear link between members of Project Veritas and allegations of criminal activities" the FBI raids and seizure of evidence were a "dangerous precedent that could allow law enforcement to search and confiscate reporters' unpublished source material in vague attempts to identify whistleblowers."

=== Football team executive (2024) ===
A vice-president of the Washington Commanders football team was fired after O'Keefe Media Group released recordings of disparaging remarks about the owner of the team, football players, and fans. O'Keefe said the team employee was recorded by a woman he met on a dating app during two dates. But the person he went out with was actually an undercover reporter for O'Keefe Media.

=== Joseph Schnitt secret recording about the Epstein files (2025) ===
On September 4, 2025, O'Keefe posted a secret recording with DOJ acting Deputy Chief of Special Operations Joseph Schnitt. In the recording, Schnitt acknowledges the existence of the Epstein files, saying there are "thousands and thousands of pages of files" and that "They'll redact every Republican or conservative person in those files, leave all the liberal, Democratic people in those files". Schnitt stated that Ghislaine Maxwell was "transferred to a minimum-security prison too recently, which is against [Federal Bureau of Prisons] policy because she's a convicted sex offender" and that "They're offering her something to keep her mouth shut". He also described Pam Bondi as "a yes person" and that she "wants whatever Trump wants".

In response to the recording, Schnitt stated that he had no idea he was being recorded, and said he met the undercover O'Keefe reporter on Hinge (dating app). He said his comments were based on what he "learned in the media" and not from the DOJ. In response, the DOJ fired Schnitt, while also asserting his statements were false, saying that "Joseph Schnitt had no role in the Department's internal review of Epstein materials" and posted an iPhone screenshot of an email Schnitt sent to his superiors describing the recordings as happening over two dates in August 2025.

=== Recording federal employees during second Trump administration ===
In 2025 O'Keefe ran deceptive stings recording federal employees and contractors discussing their political opinions in social settings. Posing as politically liberal, an O'Keefe collaborator would meet the targeted employee on a date. The conversation would be secretly recorded, edited, combined with deceptive commentary, and posted to social media in a series titled "dating the deep state." Some of the targeted people lost their jobs, and a number them filed lawsuits with allegations including defamation and violation of employee First Amendment rights.

=== Minnesota primary identity theft charges ===
After attempting to vote in the 2026 Minnesota primary, O'Keefe, along with influencer Cam Higby, were each charged with felony identity theft and unlawful voting. O'Keefe and Higby had allegedly used the names of multiple deceased and one living Minnesotan at four polling locations as part of a campaign to uncover lax voting regulations. Though they never received a ballot, in Minnesota it is illegal to misrepresent one's identity while applying for a ballot.

== Reception ==
Project Veritas uses methods not employed by reputable journalists, including misrepresenting its operatives' identities. O'Keefe refers to himself as a "guerrilla journalist". Such methods have stirred debate about what it means to be a journalist and what constitutes good journalistic practice, especially with respect to undercover work.

Tim Kenneally and Daniel Frankel reporting for TheWrap in 2011 noted that some of O'Keefe's supporters referred to him as the right wing's answer to a long line of left-leaning "hybrid troublemakers who get put on the cover of Rolling Stone, like Paul Krassner and Abbie Hoffman". In that same 2011 report, Marty Kaplan, director of the Norman Lear Center at the University of Southern California's Annenberg School for Communication and Journalism, was quoted as saying:

What [O'Keefe] does isn't journalism. It's agitpop [sic], politi-punking, entrapment-entertainment. There is no responsible definition of journalism that includes what he does or how he does it. His success at luring his prey into harming themselves is a measure of how fallible and foolish anyone, including good people, can sometimes be.

In reporting on allegations that O'Keefe had attempted in 2010 to tamper with United States Senator Mary Landrieu's office phone system, Jim Rutenberg and Campbell Robertson of the New York Times posited that O'Keefe practiced a kind of "gonzo journalism" and his tactic is to "caricature the political and social values of his enemies by carrying them to outlandish extremes."

In a March 2011 interview with O'Keefe, NPR journalist Bob Garfield asked, referring to the ACORN videos, "If your journalistic technique is the lie, why should we believe anything you have to say?" O'Keefe responded that his techniques should be characterized as a form of guerrilla theater rather than "lying" – "you're posing as something you're not, in order to capture candid conversations from your subject. But I wouldn't characterize it as, as lying."

In July 2011, Dean Mills, the dean of the Missouri School of Journalism, compared O'Keefe to Michael Moore and said, "Some ethicists say it is never right for a journalist to deceive for any reason, but there are wrongs in the world that will never be exposed without some kind of subterfuge." The Atlantic journalist Conor Friedersdorf responded that O'Keefe's "mortal sin" wasn't that he misled his subjects, but that he misled his audience by presenting his videos to the public in "less than honest ways that go far beyond normal 'selectivity.'"

On February 11, 2021, the Twitter account for Project Veritas was "permanently suspended for repeated violations of Twitter's private information policy." At the same time, O'Keefe's account was "temporarily locked" for violating the policy pending the deletion of a tweet. On April 15, Twitter permanently suspended O'Keefe's personal account for violating the Twitter's policy against "platform manipulation and spam", which disallows the use of fake accounts to "artificially amplify or disrupt conversations". O'Keefe denied that he used fake Twitter accounts and said that he would sue Twitter in response.

In December 2011 O'Keefe was listed in Forbes 30 Under 30, a list of "rising stars in the media industry." The publication regretted the pick in 2023, placing O'Keefe on its Hall of Shame, featuring ten picks it wished it could take back.

== Works ==
- O'Keefe, James (2013). Breakthrough: Our Guerrilla War to Expose Fraud and Save Democracy. New York: Threshold Editions. p. 352. ISBN 978-1-4767-0619-1. OCLC 893099977.
- O'Keefe, James (2018). American Pravda: My Fight for Truth in the Era of Fake News. New York: St. Martin's Press. p. 320. ISBN 978-1-250-15464-4.
- O'Keefe, James (2022). American Muckraker: Rethinking Journalism for the 21st Century. New York: Post Hill. p. 288. ISBN 978-1637580905.
