= Project Veritas =

American far-right activist group

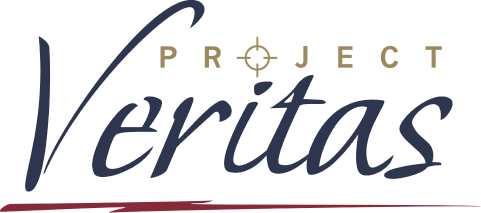
- Formation: June 2010; 16 years ago
- Founder: James O'Keefe
- Type: NGO
- Legal status: Project Veritas: 501(c)(3); Project Veritas Action: 501(c)(4)
- Location: 1214 Boston Post Road No. 148 Mamaroneck, New York 10543
- Methods: Undercover operations; Hidden cameras; Entrapment; Video manipulation
- Funding: Donors Trust
- Website: www.projectveritas.com

Project Veritas is an American far-right (Note: Far-right: Tumber, Howard; Waisbord, Silvio (2021). The Routledge Companion to Media Disinformation and Populism. Routledge. ISBN 978-1-000-34678-7 – via Google Books. "False information can make movements defend the accuracy of their own claims and materials because of doubt sowed by countermovements and governments (Tufekci 2017). For instance, Project Veritas, an alt-right group, has a track record of attacking movements through misleading editing of videos and through fabricated 'sting' operations (Benkler et al. 2018)."; Coleman, Aidan J.; Janes, Katharine M. (July 26, 2021). "Caught on Tape: Establishing the Right of Third-Party Bystanders to Secretly Record the Police". Virginia Law Review. 107. University of Virginia School of Law: 168. "Project Veritas, a far-right non-profit organization whose methods have sparked controversy, brought a separate challenge to Section 99 that, on appeal, was consolidated with K. Eric Martin and Rene Perez's suit against the Suffolk County District Attorney."; Gais, Hannah; Hayden, Edison (December 11, 2022). "White Nationalists, Other Republicans Brace for 'Total War'". Southern Poverty Law Center. "Multiple figures associated with Project Veritas, the hard-right propaganda group that engages in sting operations, attended the NYYRC gala." "Tyrmand, who is known for his ties to the global radical right, took the stage and lauded the ultranationalist European leaders in attendance."; Karbal, Ian W. (December 14, 2020). "The best journalism of 2020: Covering Trump". Columbia Journalism Review. Archived from the original on December 17, 2020. "Throughout his presidency, Trump has boosted far-right outlets with a loose relationship to truth, like Breitbart and One America News, into household names. Another such outlet, Project Veritas, apparently directed an employee to plant a false story in the Washington Post about a sexual encounter with Senate candidate Roy Moore. [...] However, careful reporting by Post journalists exposed the sting and revealed the deceitful tactics of far-right actors who brand themselves as journalists."; Covucci, David (January 14, 2020). "James O'Keefe claims Bernie Sanders will throw Trump fans in gulags". The Daily Dot. "O'Keefe is the head of Project Veritas, a far-right outlet that uses misleading edits and various forms of entrapment to try and catch Democrats, liberals, and media members in 'shocking' statements."; Wilson, Jason (July 27, 2018). "What is 'shadow banning', and why did Trump tweet about it?". The Guardian. Archived from the original on November 9, 2020.; Seidman, Andrew; Terruso, Julia (January 5, 2021). "Congress is about to formalize Biden's win. Busloads of Pa. Trump supporters are heading to D.C. to protest". The Philadelphia Inquirer. Archived from the original on January 28, 2021. "...refers to posts on far-right websites like Project Veritas."; Reimann, Nicholas (November 10, 2020). "Texas Lt. Gov. Dan Patrick Offering Up To $1 Million For Evidence Of Voter Fraud". Forbes. Archived from the original on February 1, 2021. "The far-right conspiracy theory-driven group Project Veritas is offering rewards of $25,000 for tips relating to election fraud in Pennsylvania."; Olalde, Mark (December 4, 2020). "Climate Point: Climate change disrupts life from the Hopi Reservation to Louisiana". USA Today. Archived from the original on December 8, 2020. "the Mercer family, who are ardent supporters of President Donald Trump, have given vast sums of money to conservative causes and partly funded the far-right Project Veritas, which tries to secretly record and smear journalists, nonprofits and other targets."; Miao, Hannah (December 4, 2020). "New Jersey Gov. Phil Murphy slams New York Young Republican Club for hosting large, maskless gala in Jersey City amid Covid surge". CNBC. Archived from the original on December 8, 2020. "Featured attendees at the gala included keynote speaker James O'Keefe, founder of far-right group Project Veritas"; "US House race to watch: Lois Frankel vs Laura Loomer". Al Jazeera. October 31, 2020. "She previously worked undercover for Project Veritas, a far-right organisation known for targeting leftists and anti-fascists."; Mathers, Matt (December 7, 2020). "AOC embroiled in fresh Twitter row with Marco Rubio over PPP loans". The Independent. "Project Veritas is a far-right activist group, which says it uses undercover techniques to reveal so-called liberal bias and corruption."; Foster, Ally (November 12, 2020). "Trump supporters plan massive protests". News.com.au. "His claims were publicised by Project Veritas, a far-right activist group"; Adler-Bell, Sam (May 23, 2018). "Prosecutors Withheld Evidence That Could Exonerate J20 Inauguration Protesters, Judge Rules". The Intercept. "The video of the planning meeting was provided to investigators by Project Veritas, a controversial far-right media group known for 'sting' operations against its political opponents and the publication of selectively edited videos."; Min, Janice (March 22, 2021). "Pinterest and the Subtle Poison of Sexism and Racism in Silicon Valley". Time. "Later, Ozoma's cell-phone number and internal company emails appeared on extremist platforms including 4chan and 8chan following leaks by a white male colleague, a software developer, to Project Veritas, the far-right activist group founded by James O'Keefe. She received threats of rape and death."; Choi, Joseph (April 14, 2021). "Matt Gaetz makes six-figure ad buy targeting CNN amid sex trafficking allegations". The Hill. "The ad includes footage by the far-right activist group Project Veritas that shows a man identified as a CNN employee talking about news coverage of Gaetz, Politico reported. Project Veritas is known for publishing undercover sting footage that has been deceptively edited to reflect badly on organizations and people it disagrees with.") activist group founded by James O'Keefe in 2010. The group produced deceptively edited videos (Note: Deceptive: Goss, Brian Michael (March 12, 2018). "Veritable Flak Mill". Journalism Studies. 19 (4): 548–563. doi:10.1080/1461670X.2017.1375388. ISSN 1461-670X. S2CID 149185981. "To wit, Schiller's apparently bemused response to sharia law supposedly on the march was spliced-in from an unrelated moment of the discourse – a blatant deception through editing."; Tumber, Howard; Waisbord, Silvio (2021). The Routledge Companion to Media Disinformation and Populism. Routledge. ISBN 978-1-000-34678-7 – via Google Books. "False information can make movements defend the accuracy of their own claims and materials because of doubt sowed by countermovements and governments (Tufekci 2017). For instance, Project Veritas, an alt-right group, has a track record of attacking movements through misleading editing of videos and through fabricated 'sting' operations (Benkler et al. 2018)."; Kroeger, Brooke (2012). "Watchdog". Undercover Reporting: The Truth About Deception. Northwestern University Press. pp. 249–254. ISBN 978-0-8101-2619-0. JSTOR j.ctt22727sf.17. Archived from the original on December 6, 2020.; Czarnecki, Sean (January 19, 2018). "A guide to the 7 types of fake news from Storyful's new editor". PRWeek. Archived from the original on February 1, 2021.; Choi, Joseph (April 14, 2021). "Matt Gaetz makes six-figure ad buy targeting CNN amid sex trafficking allegations". The Hill. "The ad includes footage by the far-right activist group Project Veritas that shows a man identified as a CNN employee talking about news coverage of Gaetz, Politico reported. Project Veritas is known for publishing undercover sting footage that has been deceptively edited to reflect badly on organizations and people it disagrees with."; Pilkington, Ed (November 29, 2017). "Project Veritas: how fake news prize went to rightwing group beloved by Trump". The Guardian. Archived from the original on August 11, 2019.; Karbal, Ian W. (November 3, 2020). "How careful local reporting undermined Trump's claims of voter fraud". Columbia Journalism Review. Archived from the original on November 21, 2020.; Sebenius, Alyza; Brody, Ben (June 26, 2019). "Trump suggests U.S. should sue Facebook and Google". Bloomberg News. Archived from the original on September 12, 2020.; Newton, Casey; Brandom, Russell (June 27, 2019). "Project Veritas' YouTube sting was deeply misleading – and successful". The Verge. Archived from the original on June 28, 2019.; LaCapria, Kim (October 18, 2016). "Project Veritas' Election 2016 'Rigging' Videos". Snopes.; Poniewozik, James (March 13, 2011). "The Twisty, Bent Truth of the NPR-Sting Video". Time. Archived from the original on June 14, 2019.; "Video: Dem Activist Brags About Disrupting Trump Rallies". CBS Miami. October 19, 2020. Archived from the original on November 7, 2020.; Ellefson, Lindsey (December 2, 2020). "Project Veritas Issues Correction for Misidentifying CNN Employee in Call". TheWrap. Archived from the original on January 25, 2021.) of its undercover operations, which use secret recordings in an effort to discredit mainstream media organizations and progressive groups. Project Veritas also used entrapment to generate bad publicity for its targets, and propagated disinformation (Note: Disinformation: Goss, Brian Michael (March 12, 2018). "Veritable Flak Mill". Journalism Studies. 19 (4): 548–563. doi:10.1080/1461670X.2017.1375388. ISSN 1461-670X. S2CID 149185981.; Tumber, Howard; Waisbord, Silvio (2021). The Routledge Companion to Media Disinformation and Populism. Routledge. ISBN 978-1-000-34678-7 – via Google Books. "False information can make movements defend the accuracy of their own claims and materials because of doubt sowed by countermovements and governments (Tufekci 2017). For instance, Project Veritas, an alt-right group, has a track record of attacking movements through misleading editing of videos and through fabricated 'sting' operations (Benkler et al. 2018)."; Benkler, Yochai; Faris, Rob; Roberts, Hal (2018). "What Can Men Do Against Such Reckless Hate?". Network Propaganda: Manipulation, Disinformation and Radicalization in American Politics. Oxford University Press. p. 358. doi:10.1093/oso/9780190923624.001.0001. ISBN 978-0-19-092362-4. OCLC 1045162158. "In November 2017, for example, the right-wing disinformation outfit Project Veritas tried to trip up The Washington Post, offering the Post a fake informant who told the Post that Roy Moore had impregnated her when she was a teenager."; Kroeger, Brooke (2012). "Watchdog". Undercover Reporting: The Truth About Deception. Northwestern University Press. pp. 249–254. ISBN 978-0-8101-2619-0. JSTOR j.ctt22727sf.17. Archived from the original on December 6, 2020.; Czarnecki, Sean (January 19, 2018). "A guide to the 7 types of fake news from Storyful's new editor". PRWeek. Archived from the original on February 1, 2021.; Hellinger, Daniel C. (2019). "Globalization, Populism, Conspiracism". Conspiracies and Conspiracy Theories in the Age of Trump. Palgrave Macmillan. pp. 141–184. doi:10.1007/978-3-319-98158-1_5. ISBN 978-3-319-98157-4. S2CID 158077533.; Cagé, Julia (February 11, 2021). "From Philanthropy to Democracy: Rethinking Governance and Funding of High-Quality News in the Digital Age". In Bernholz, Lucy; Landemore, Hélène; Reich, Rob (eds.). Digital Technology and Democratic Theory. University of Chicago Press. doi:10.7208/chicago/9780226748603.003.0010. ISBN 978-0-226-74843-6 – via Google Books. "An additional example of the growing spread of fake news financed by billionaires is Project Veritas, an organization run by James O'Keefe that specializes in operations against the media (e.g., recently against The Washington Post and The New York Times). According to The Washington Post, relying on documents fielded [sic] with the International [sic] Revenue Service, Project Veritas received $1.7 million in 2017 from charity associated with the Koch brothers. Furthermore, other contributors to Project Veritas in recent years include Gravitas Maximus LLC, an organization controlled by the Mercer family." (Note: This phrase as it stands contains typos even though it is an exact quote from the book. It should be "relying on documents filed with the Internal Revenue Service".); Garcia-Camargo, Isabella; Stamos, Alex; Cryst, Elena; Bak-Coleman, Joe; Starbird, Kate; Schafer, Joey (September 29, 2020). "Project Veritas #BallotHarvesting Amplification". Election Integrity Partnership. Archived from the original on January 29, 2021.; Astor, Maggie (September 29, 2020). "Project Veritas Video Was a 'Coordinated Disinformation Campaign', Researchers Say". The New York Times. "[Project Veritas is] a great example of what a coordinated disinformation campaign looks like"; Arnold, Amanda (January 7, 2021). "5 People Are Dead Following Violent Siege at U.S. Capitol". The Cut. Archived from the original on January 27, 2021.; Palmer, Scott (November 6, 2019). "ABC News anchor says Jeffrey Epstein exposé killed by Royal palace's threats". Newshub. Archived from the original on November 24, 2020.; Wolfman-Arent, Avi (May 31, 2018). "N.J. lawmakers question teachers union on undercover videos". WHYY.) and conspiracy theories in its videos and operations.

Project Veritas's targets included Planned Parenthood, the Association of Community Organizations for Reform Now (ACORN), NPR, CNN, and The Washington Post. In 2009, Project Veritas associates published misleading videos that depicted ACORN employees providing advice on concealing illegal activity, causing ACORN to shut down after losing funding; the attorney general of California cleared ACORN of wrongdoing in 2010, and the associates paid a total of $150,000 in settlements to an ACORN employee who sued for defamation. NPR CEO Vivian Schiller resigned in 2013 after Project Veritas released a deceptively edited video portraying another NPR executive making controversial comments about the Tea Party movement and NPR's federal funding. Project Veritas unsuccessfully attempted to mislead The Washington Post into publishing false information about the Roy Moore sexual misconduct allegations in 2017; the Post won a Pulitzer Prize after uncovering the operation. In 2022, a jury awarded $120,000 against Project Veritas for fraudulent misrepresentation of the nonprofit Democracy Partners.

As a non-governmental organization, Project Veritas was financed by conservative fund Donors Trust (which provided over $6.6 million from 2011 to 2019) and other supporters, including the Donald J. Trump Foundation. In 2020, The New York Times published an exposé detailing Project Veritas's use of spies recruited by Erik Prince to infiltrate "Democratic congressional campaigns, labor organizations and other groups considered hostile to the Trump agenda". The Times piece notes O'Keefe's and Prince's close links to the Trump administration, and details contributions such as a $1 million transfer of funds from an undisclosed source to support their work. The findings were based in part on discovery documents in a case brought by the American Federation of Teachers, Michigan, which had been infiltrated by Project Veritas.

The organization's board fired O'Keefe in February 2023 for what it said was financial malfeasance with donor money. In September 2023, Project Veritas suspended all operations after laying off most of its employees. In December of the same year, Hannah Giles, who succeeded O'Keefe as CEO of the organization, resigned.

== History ==
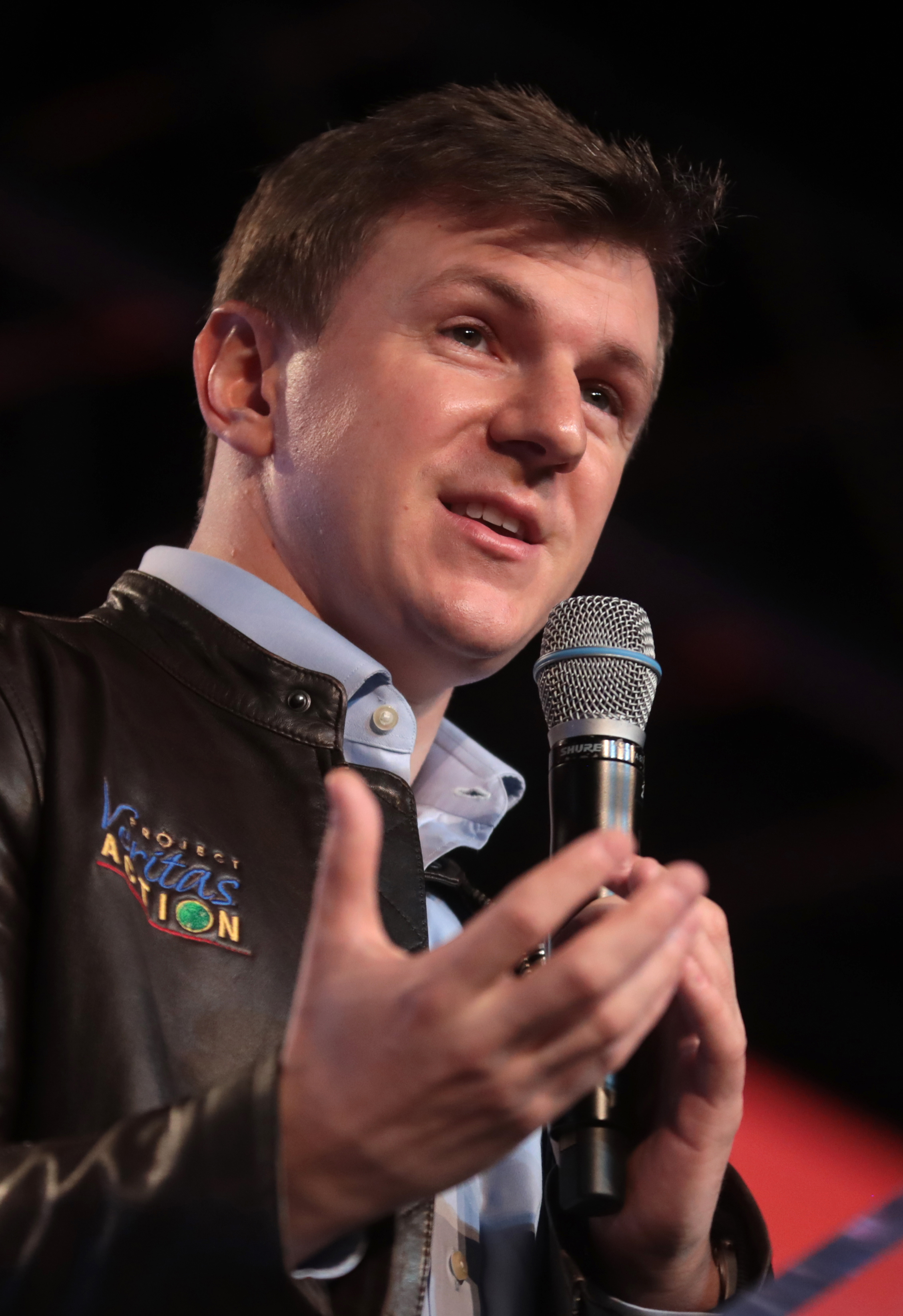
Project Veritas founder James O'Keefe

Project Veritas was founded in June 2010 by James O'Keefe, who served as chairman until he separated from the organization in February 2023 amid controversy over his handling of finances and his management style.

During the 2016 United States presidential election, the organization falsely claimed to have shown that Hillary Clinton's presidential campaign accepted illegal donations from foreign sources. Two Project Veritas members were sued for defamation by an employee of Association of Community Organizations for Reform Now (ACORN) who was wrongfully depicted as a "willing participant in an underage sex-trafficking scheme". The suit resulted in two settlements: O'Keefe issued a statement of regret and paid the ACORN employee $100,000 in 2013; the other Project Veritas member paid the employee an additional $50,000 in 2012.

In 2017, Project Veritas was caught in a failed attempt to trick The Washington Post into posting a fabricated story about the sexual misconduct allegations against Republican Senate candidate Roy Moore. Rather than uncritically publish a story that accused Moore of impregnating a teenager, the Post critically examined the story, checked the source, assessed her credibility, and found that her claims had no merit, and that instead Project Veritas was trying to dupe The Washington Post.

O'Keefe has been barred from fundraising for Project Veritas in Florida, Maine, Mississippi, Utah, and Wisconsin, partly because of his federal criminal record for entering a federal building under fraudulent pretenses and partly because Project Veritas has repeatedly failed to properly disclose his criminal convictions in applications for nonprofit status. Similar disclosure issues for the group's registration also exist in New Mexico, New York, and North Carolina.

On February 11, 2021, Project Veritas's Twitter account was "permanently suspended for repeated violations of Twitter's private information policy." At the same time, O'Keefe's personal account was temporarily locked for violating the policy pending the deletion of a tweet. Twitter permanently suspended O'Keefe's personal account on April 15 for violating its policy on "platform manipulation and spam", which prohibits the use of fake accounts to "artificially amplify or disrupt conversations". O'Keefe denied that he used fake accounts on Twitter and said he intended to sue Twitter in response. In November 2022, following the acquisition of Twitter by Elon Musk, Project Veritas's account was restored along with a number of other high-profile far-right accounts.

In September 2021, Project Veritas's headquarters in Marmaroneck, New York, was destroyed by Hurricane Ida. Later that month, the organization announced that it had been scammed out of $165,000 in what appeared to be a business email compromise attack. Attackers monitoring O'Keefe's email communications with his attorneys succeeded in interjecting an email from a similar-looking account into a conversation about an invoice payment, and the organization transferred funds to an account operated by the scammers.

O'Keefe was removed from his leadership position at Project Veritas on February 20, 2023, amid allegations of financial malfeasance and poor management of staff. The board charged that O'Keefe had used funds for a variety of personal expenses, including $14,000 for a charter flight related to fixing his boat and $150,000 for "black cars". The staff concerns were communicated to the board in a memo calling O'Keefe a "power-drunk tyrant". According to an unreleased internal audit, O'Keefe also directed Project Veritas employees to book a $12,000 helicopter flight from New York to Southwest Harbor, spent $208,980 on black car travel and $2,500 on DJ equipment and was abusive towards Project Veritas employees. O'Keefe also allegedly spent donor money on a romantic relationship with Alexandra Rose, a California real estate agent and star of the Netflix reality series Selling the OC.

Project Veritas subsequently sued O'Keefe and two others, alleging that they had created a competing organization, O'Keefe Media Group, while still employees, approaching PV's donors and using company funds for this purpose. O'Keefe was also alleged to have improperly spent company funds on himself.

In 2023, after six employees sued Project Veritas for underpayment, it settled for $270,000. At the same time, Project Veritas settled a former employee's sexual harassment suit alleging a "highly sexualized" workplace with "rampant" drug use.

In September 2023, Project Veritas suspended all operations after laying off most of its employees.

Hannah Giles, who had been appointed CEO to replace O'Keefe in June 2023, resigned in December that same year. Upon resigning, she wrote, "I stepped into an unsalvageable mess – one wrought with strong evidence of past illegality and past financial improprieties." She added, "Once such evidence was discovered, I brought the information to the appropriate law enforcement agencies."

== Methods ==
Project Veritas uses deceptive techniques, including recording people without their knowledge and misrepresenting their employees' identities and purposes. It hires former U.S. and British military and intelligence agents to train its employees, who are often called "agents" or "operatives" in internal documents. Internal memos show that Project Veritas clears these activities with its legal team to stay within the boundaries of the law, which The New York Times says is a sign of its interest in "using tactics that test the boundaries of legality and are outside of mainstream reporting techniques". Rolling Stone called Project Veritas's reporting practices "dubious", with their reporters actively manipulating their targets.

== Deceptive video recordings ==
Project Veritas was founded in June 2010, but O'Keefe produced two series of deceptive videos before founding it:

=== Planned Parenthood recordings (2006–2008) ===
In 2006, O'Keefe met Lila Rose, the founder of an anti-abortion group on the University of California, Los Angeles (UCLA) campus. They secretly recorded encounters in Planned Parenthood clinics in Los Angeles and Santa Monica, in which Rose posed as a 15-year-old girl impregnated by a 23-year-old man. Rose and O'Keefe made two videos incorporating heavily edited versions of the recordings and released them on YouTube. The video omitted the parts of the conversation in which a Planned Parenthood employee asked Rose to consult her mother about the pregnancy and another employee told her, "We have to follow the laws." Rose took down those videos after Planned Parenthood sent her a cease and desist letter in May 2007 asserting that the videos violated California's voice recording laws, which require consent from all recorded parties, but they continued to make more clandestine videos.

=== ACORN videos (2009) ===
The organization produced deceptively edited videos targeting the Association of Community Organizations for Reform Now (ACORN), a 40-year-old advocacy organization for low- and moderate-income people.

In September 2009, O'Keefe and his associate Hannah Giles published edited hidden-camera recordings in which Giles posed as a prostitute and O'Keefe as her boyfriend, a law student, in an attempt to elicit damaging responses from ACORN employees. ACORN mostly registered people from Latino and African American communities.

The videos were recorded during the summer of 2009 and appeared to show low-level ACORN employees in six cities advising Giles and O'Keefe on how to avoid detection by authorities of tax evasion, human smuggling and child prostitution. He framed the undercover recordings with a preface of him dressed in a "pimp" outfit, which he also wore in TV media interviews. This gave viewers, including the media, the impression that he had dressed that way when speaking to ACORN workers, but he actually entered the ACORN offices in conservative street clothes (the sleeve of his dress shirt is visible on camera). Furthermore, the ACORN employees involved reported his activities to the San Diego Police Department after he left. O'Keefe selectively edited and manipulated his recordings of ACORN employees and distorted the chronologies. Several journalists and media outlets expressed regret for failing to properly scrutinize and vet his work.

==== Reception and lawsuit ====
After the videos were released, Congress voted to freeze federal funding to ACORN. The Census Bureau and the Internal Revenue Service (IRS) terminated their contract relationships with ACORN. By December 2009, an external investigation of ACORN was published that cleared it of any illegality, while commenting that its poor management practices contributed to unprofessional actions by some low-level employees. In March 2010, ACORN announced it would dissolve due to loss of funding from government and especially private sources. On March 1, 2010, Brooklyn District Attorney Charles J. Hynes found that there was no criminal wrongdoing by the ACORN staff in New York.

The California Attorney General's Office granted O'Keefe and Giles limited immunity from prosecution in exchange for providing the full, unedited videotapes related to ACORN offices in California. On the basis of the edited video that O'Keefe released, ACORN employee Juan Carlos Vera appeared to be a willing participant in O'Keefe's plan to illegally smuggle young women into the U.S., but authorities confirmed that Vera immediately contacted them about O'Keefe and that he had also encouraged O'Keefe to share as much information as possible about his scheme and gather further evidence of O'Keefe's purported illegal activities, which could be used by prosecutors to bring charges against O'Keefe for attempted human trafficking. Due to O'Keefe's release of the dubiously edited video, intentionally designed to "prove" that ACORN employees were ready and willing to engage in illicit activities, Vera lost his job and was falsely portrayed as engaged in human trafficking.

O'Keefe moved for summary judgment in his favor, arguing that the plaintiff had no reasonable expectation that the conversation would be private. In August 2012, the federal judge hearing the case denied O'Keefe's motion. The judge ruled that O'Keefe had "misled plaintiff to believe that the conversation would remain confidential by posing as a client seeking services from ACORN and asking whether their conversation was confidential." On March 5, 2013, O'Keefe agreed to pay Vera $100,000 and acknowledged in the settlement that at the time he published his video he was unaware that Vera had notified the police about the incident. As part of the settlement, O'Keefe apologized for his actions, expressing regret for "any pain suffered by Mr. Vera or his family." Giles paid Vera $50,000 in a separate 2012 settlement.

On June 14, 2010, the Government Accountability Office (GAO) published its report finding no evidence that ACORN or any of its related organizations had mishandled any of the $40 million in federal money they had received in recent years.

=== New Jersey Teachers' Union video (2010) ===
Starting on October 25, 2010, O'Keefe posted a series of videos on the Internet titled Teachers Unions Gone Wild. At the time, the New Jersey Education Association (NJEA) was in negotiations with New Jersey Governor Chris Christie over teacher pay benefits and tenure. O'Keefe obtained a video from recordings made by "citizen journalists" he recruited to attend the NJEA's leadership conference. They secretly recorded meetings and conversations with teacher participants. It featured teachers discussing the difficulty of firing a tenured teacher.

A second video featured a staged phone conversation by O'Keefe with Lawrence E. Everett, assistant superintendent of the Passaic, New Jersey city schools, in which Everett refused to commit to firing a teacher based on a parent's purported claim that the teacher had used the "n-word" with his child. A third video (October 26, 2010) featured audio of a voice, identified as NJEA Associate Director Wayne Dibofsky, who alleged voter fraud during the 1997 Jersey City mayoral election. The voice of Robert Byrne, Jersey City municipal clerk, was recorded on the same video; he noted that lawyers for both candidates monitored the election.

Christie said at the time that nothing on the videos surprised him. NJEA spokesman Steve Wollmer said the union and its attorneys were discussing their options for legal action, but none was ever taken. Wollmer called the videos "a calculated attack on this organization and its members" and called O'Keefe "flat-out sleazy".

=== Medicaid videos (2011) ===
In the summer of 2011, O'Keefe released videos in which an actor working for Project Veritas attempted to apply for benefits while hinting that he was a drug smuggler; the actor failed to obtain benefits. In Maine, Governor Paul LePage concluded upon further examination of the videos that there was no fraud or intent to commit fraud.

The videos received less media attention than earlier O'Keefe efforts. Generally, the state officials and representatives acknowledged potential problems but also took a measured tone in response, to allow time to fully investigate and evaluate the incidents. After viewing the video, LePage thanked the person who took the video and noted: "The video in its entirety does not show a person willfully helping someone defraud the welfare system. It does show a need for further job knowledge and continuous and improved staff training." He also said that "we would be six months further along in fixing the problem" if he had received the video when it was filmed. LePage directed his agency director to work on correcting the problem.

Ben Johnson of the Ohio Department of Job and Family Services noted that benefits were never granted in the case, and that the made-up story would have been caught if the application process had proceeded. He said his office would use the video to strengthen staff training. Ohio Attorney General Mike DeWine called the Ohio video "outrageous" and intended to instruct his state's Medicaid fraud unit to look into the incident. The director of the Ohio Department of Job and Family Services, Michael Colbert, notified county leaders of a mandatory retraining "to ensure they can identify people trying to defraud the government". A spokesman for Virginia Governor Bob McDonnell said he had asked state police to review the video and take appropriate action.

In Charleston, South Carolina, the director of that state's Department of Health and Human Services, Anthony Kreck, said the video filmed in his state "raises concerns about how well trained and supported our staff are to handle outrageous situations". He also expressed concern for the safety of the state employee with the figure ["Sean Murphy"] in the video "who could be interpreted as intimidating" and questioned why security wasn't called.

=== NPR video (2011) ===
On March 8, 2011, shortly before Congress was to vote on funding for National Public Radio (NPR), O'Keefe released a heavily edited video of a discussion with Ronald Schiller, NPR's senior vice president for fundraising, and associate Betsy Liley. The content was secretly recorded by O'Keefe's partners, Simon Templar (a pseudonym) and Shaughn Adeleye, who pretended to be Muslims named Ibrahim Kasaam and Amir Malik.

In the video, the NPR executives were shown meeting with Kasaam and Malik, who styled themselves as representatives of a self-described Muslim charity called the "Muslim Education Action Center" that wished to donate money to NPR. NPR responded that Schiller's remarks were presented out of sequence and that he said that he would speak personally, and not for NPR. Schiller said some highly placed Republicans believed the Republican Party had been hijacked by a radical group (the Tea Party) that they characterized as "Islamophobic" and "seriously racist, racist people", and while Schiller did not disagree, according to NPR, O'Keefe's editing made it appear those were Schiller's opinions. Schiller then says that unlike establishment Republicans, the growing Tea Party movement in the party "is fanatically involved in people's personal lives and very fundamental Christian – I wouldn't even call it Christian. It's this weird evangelical kind of move [sic]."

Later in the edited video, Schiller seems to say he believes NPR "would be better off in the long run without federal funding", explaining that removal of federal funding would give NPR more independence and remove the widely held misconception that it is significantly funded by the public. But on the raw tape, Schiller also said that withdrawing federal funding would cause local stations to go under and that NPR is doing "everything we can" to keep it.

In a statement released before analysis of the longer raw video, NPR said, "The fraudulent organization represented in this video repeatedly pressed us to accept a $5 million check, with no strings attached, which we repeatedly refused to accept. We are appalled by the comments made by Ron Schiller in the video, which are contrary to what NPR stands for."

Journalists Ben Smith, James Poniewozik, and Dave Weigel have expressed regret for giving O'Keefe's NPR videos wider circulation without scrutinizing them further.

==== Reception ====
Comparison of the raw video with the released one revealed editing characterized as "selective" and "deceptive" by Michael Gerson, opinion writer in The Washington Post, who wrote, "O'Keefe did not merely leave a false impression; he manufactured an elaborate, alluring lie." Time magazine wrote that the video "transposed remarks from a different part of the meeting", was "manipulative" and "a partisan hit-job".

The raw video shows Schiller told the two men "that donors cannot expect to influence news coverage". On the longer tape, he says, "There is such a big firewall between funding and reporting: Reporters will not be swayed in any way, shape or form." The broadcast journalist Al Tompkins, who now teaches at the Poynter Institute, noted that Ron Schiller was a fundraiser, not an official affecting the newsroom. He commented on the raw tape: "The message that he said most often – I counted six times: He told these two people that he had never met before that you cannot buy coverage", Tompkins said. "He says it over and over and over again.

On March 17, Martha T. Moore of USA Today reported: "According to The Blaze analysis, Ron Schiller's most inflammatory remarks, that Tea Party members are 'seriously racist', were made as he was recounting the views of Republicans he has spoken with – although he does not appear to disagree. It also shows Schiller appearing to laugh about the potential spread of Islamic sharia law, when the longer version shows he laughed in reaction to something completely different."

Two days later, O'Keefe released a video in which Betsy Liley, senior director of institutional giving at NPR, appeared to have checked with senior management and said MEAC was cleared to make donations anonymously and NPR could help shield donations from government audits, but added that, in order to proceed, additional background information would be required, including an IRS Form 990. Liley advised the caller that NPR executives would investigate them before accepting any large donation, examining tax records and checking out other organizations that have received donations from them. Liley raises the possibility of NPR's turning down substantial gifts and stresses the "firewall" between the revenue-generating part of NPR and its news operation. NPR put Liley on administrative leave. In emails released following the publication of the Liley video, NPR confirmed that the official had consulted appropriately with top management and notified the purported donors of problems with their desired method of donation.

The video, which was released directly before a congressional vote on funding, caused immediate reaction from NPR critics in Congress. Schiller, who had already submitted his resignation in January so that he could join the Aspen Institute, moved up his resignation after the video release when NPR put him on administrative leave. NPR CEO Vivian Schiller (no relation to Ronald Schiller), who had not been implicated in the Project Veritas video, quickly resigned. Vivian Schiller's resignation, mutually decided with the NPR board, was in part an attempt to show Congressional funders that NPR could hold itself accountable.

=== New Hampshire primary video (2012) ===
In January 2012, O'Keefe released a video of associates obtaining a number of ballots for the New Hampshire primary by using the names of recently deceased voters. He said the video showed that "the integrity of the elections process is severely comprised [sic]." His team culled names from published obituaries, which were checked against public voter roll information. O'Keefe said his team broke no laws, as they did not pretend to be the deceased persons when they asked for the ballots and did not cast votes after receiving ballots. One of his associates' attempts was caught by a voting supervisor at the polling station who recognized that the name he gave was of a deceased person; the associate in question left before police arrived.

==== Reception ====
Sarah Parnass of ABC News reported that the video "either exposes why voting laws are too lax or comes close to itself being voter fraud (or both)". One media account called it a stunt. New Hampshire Governor John Lynch said, "I think it is outrageous that we have out-of-staters coming into New Hampshire, coming into our polling places and misrepresenting themselves to the election officials, and I hope that they should be prosecuted to the fullest extent of the law, if in fact they're found guilty of some criminal act." The New Hampshire Attorney General and the US Attorney's Office announced investigations into the video.

New Hampshire Associate Attorney General Richard Head said he would investigate possible weaknesses in the voting system, but noted the state did not have a history of known fraud related to people seeking ballots in the names of dead people. Head announced he would investigate the possibility that the filmmakers committed crimes while producing the videos.

Hamline University law professor David Schultz said, "If they [O'Keefe's group] were intentionally going in and trying to fraudulently obtain a ballot, they violated the law", referring to Title 42, which prohibits procuring ballots fraudulently. The New Hampshire Attorney General's office dropped its investigation of O'Keefe for voter fraud in 2013.

=== Patrick Moran (2012) ===
On October 24, 2012, a video was released showing Patrick Moran, son of then-U.S. Representative Jim Moran, and a field director with his father's campaign, discussing a plan to cast fraudulent ballots, which was proposed to him by someone who posed as a fervent supporter of the campaign. The person he was speaking with was a conservative activist with Project Veritas, and was secretly recording the conversation. Patrick Moran resigned from the campaign, saying he did not want to be a distraction during the election, adding:

[A]t no point have I, or will I ever endorse any sort of illegal or unethical behavior. At no point did I take this person seriously. He struck me as being unstable and joking, and for only that reason did I humor him. In hindsight, I should have immediately walked away, making it clear that there is no place in the electoral process for even the suggestion of illegal behavior, joking or not.

The Arlington County Police Department was made aware of the video and opened a criminal investigation into "every component" of the matter.

On January 31, 2013, Arlington County announced that the investigation by its police department in collaboration with the Offices of the Virginia Attorney General and the Arlington County Commonwealth's Attorney had concluded and that no charges would be brought. The County stated: "Patrick Moran and the Jim Moran for Congress campaign provided full cooperation throughout the investigation. Despite repeated attempts to involve the party responsible for producing the video, they failed to provide any assistance."

=== Battleground Texas (2014) ===
In 2014, Project Veritas released a video purporting to show illegalities in voter registration activities conducted by Battleground Texas. A complaint against Battleground Texas was filed with the Secretary of State office, where the case was ultimately referred to two special prosecutors. The special prosecutors' report concluded there was "no applicable criminal offense for the alleged act and insufficient evidence to suggest potential offenses". The report also described the video as "little more than a canard and political disinformation". The case was dismissed.

=== Documentary filmmaker Josh Fox (2014) ===
In 2014, at the Cannes Film Festival, Project Veritas released a deceptive video purporting to show that Josh Fox and other environmentalist documentary filmmakers could be influenced by foreign money. Fox is known for Gasland, a film that exposed problems with the use of fracking for U.S. gas and oil production. Pretending to represent Middle Eastern petroleum interests, Project Veritas operatives promised anonymous funding if Fox produced a documentary to their liking. Their professed interest was that opposing fracking would preserve U.S. reliance on Middle Eastern oil. Fox released his own recording of the phone call, which showed the Project Veritas video was a misrepresentation. Fox had repeatedly told the fake investors that he was not interested.

=== Americans United for Change videos (2016) ===
On October 18, 2016, O'Keefe released a series of videos on Project Veritas's YouTube channel titled "Rigging the Election" apparently showing former national field director Scott Foval of Americans United for Change saying they should ensure they had people at the front of the rope lines at rallies in order to ask questions, a common practice known as "bird dogging". The videos' accuracy was questioned for possibly omitting context, and the unedited raw footage has not been made available. The GOP-appointed Attorney General of Wisconsin, Brad Schimel, investigated the claims made in the video twice, both times finding no evidence that Foval broke any voting laws.

DNC Chair Donna Brazile said, "We do not believe, or have any evidence to suggest, that the activities articulated in the video actually occurred." Americans United for Change fired Foval after the first video was released. Foval later said he had been set up. Robert Creamer, a DNC consultant and husband of U.S. Representative Jan Schakowsky, said, "We regret the unprofessional and careless hypothetical conversations that were captured on hidden cameras of a regional contractor for our firm, and he is no longer working with us. While none of the schemes described in the conversations ever took place, these conversations do not at all reflect the values of Democracy Partners." Shortly afterward, Creamer, who was also featured in the video, said he would end his consulting arrangement with the DNC to avoid becoming a distraction.

After his videos were published, O'Keefe filed a complaint with the Federal Election Commission (FEC) against Hillary Clinton's presidential campaign and the DNC, alleging "a criminal conspiracy" involving the campaign, the DNC and three left-leaning super PACs. On June 1, 2017, Creamer's firm, Democracy Partners, filed a $1 million lawsuit against Project Veritas, claiming it had lied to gain access to the firm and violated anti-wiretapping laws. In September 2022, a jury found that Project Veritas had violated wiretapping laws and misrepresented itself to Democracy Partners, which the jury awarded $120,000. Project Veritas said it would appeal the decision.

In response to a third video, in which O'Keefe said that Clinton was behind an illegal public relations gimmick to punish Trump for not releasing his tax returns, the Clinton campaign denied any wrongdoing. Independent campaign finance experts said the video did not support O'Keefe's claims. Clinton said she was aware of the activists dressed as Donald Duck, who were following Trump while asking about his tax returns, and said she was amused.

On October 26, 2016, O'Keefe posted a fourth video on his Project Veritas Action YouTube channel. The video alleged that liberal groups supporting Hillary were illegally taking foreign money. The targeted group, Americans United for Change foundation, is a 501(c)4 organization and is allowed to accept foreign contributions, but it returned the money shortly after the video was released. The group's chief said, "We returned the money because the last thing we want to be associated with is a character like O'Keefe who has been convicted and successfully sued for his illegal tactics and fraudulent activities."

On January 9, 2017, Project Veritas operative Allison Maass was filmed attempting to bribe members of Americans Take Action into inciting a riot at Trump's inauguration. On January 16, 2017, Project Veritas uploaded a video showing DC Antifascist Coalition members of Disrupt J20 plotting to use "stink bombs" at the DeploraBall. After the video's release, Disrupt J20 denied that, saying that the members deliberately gave false information to Veritas. The video led to the arrest of one man allegedly involved in the plan, as well as two associates. All three pleaded guilty.

=== New York City elections official video (2016) ===
In October 2016, Project Veritas released a video taken at a United Federation of Teachers holiday party on December 16, 2015. It was secretly recorded by a Project Veritas associate posing as a political consultant. In the video, the Democratic representative from Manhattan on the New York City Board of Elections, Commissioner Alan Schulkin, agreed with several of the Veritas operatives' statements criticizing Mayor Bill de Blasio's municipal ID program. Schulkin said, "The law says you can't ask for anything. Which they really should be able to do. I believe they should be able to do it. They should ask for your ID. I think there is a lot of voter fraud"; "People don't realize – certain neighborhoods in particular, they bus people around to vote"; and "They put them in a bus and go poll site to poll site."

Shortly after the video's release, de Blasio called Schulkin's behavior "entirely inappropriate" and said that Schulkin should resign. In a follow-up interview with the New York Post, Schulkin said, "I should have said 'potential fraud' instead of 'fraud'". Of the Project Veritas operative who secretly recorded him, Schulkin said, "She was like a nuisance. I was just trying to placate her", noting that in his haste to get away from her, he "was agreeing with her when I shouldn't have been." Schulkin was not reappointed after his term expired on December 31, 2016.

=== CNN undercover videos (2017) ===
On June 26, 2017, O'Keefe released a hidden-camera video on Project Veritas's YouTube channel that showed John Bonifield, a producer of health and medical stories for CNN, saying that CNN's coverage of the Russian investigation was for "ratings" and that the coverage was "mostly bullshit". Bonifield had no involvement in CNN's political reporting; the video falsely implied that Bonifeld held a senior decision-making role at CNN. When asked who Bonifield was speaking to or the video's source, Project Veritas declined to comment. According to a CNN investigation, Veritas's operative gained access to Bonifield by falsely presenting themself as seeking a mentor for a career in journalism. In a statement, CNN said: "CNN stands by our medical producer John Bonifield. Diversity of personal opinion is what makes CNN strong, we welcome it and embrace it." During a White House press briefing, deputy White House press secretary Sarah Huckabee Sanders encouraged people to watch the video "whether it's accurate or not".

On June 28, 2017, O'Keefe released the second part of the series of undercover videos, by then dubbed "American Pravda". In the video, CNN anchor Van Jones said, "The Russia thing is just a big nothingburger." When asked about the video in an email, CNN responded, "lol". The same day, the videos were posted on Donald Trump's Instagram account. Jones said that O'Keefe had deceptively edited the video to take his remarks out of context and was attempting to "pull off a hoax", adding that he believed that there probably was collusion between the Trump campaign and the Russian government.

On June 30, 2017, O'Keefe released the third part of the undercover videos. Part 3 of the series showed CNN associate producer Jimmy Carr saying that Trump is "fucking crazy" and that "on the inside, we all recognize he is a clown, that he is hilariously unqualified for this, he's really bad at this, and that he does not have America's best interests". Carr also said: "This is a man who's not actually a Republican; he just adopted that because that was the party he thought he could win in. He doesn't believe anything that these people believe." He also called American voters "stupid as shit" and called Counselor to the President Kellyanne Conway an "awful woman" who "looks like she got hit with a shovel". In a fourth video Project Veritas published on July 5, Carr criticized CNN co-anchor Chris Cuomo.

=== New Jersey Education Association videos (2018) ===
On May 2, 2018, Project Veritas posted on YouTube two videos in which a Project Veritas employee, posing as the sister of a non-existent teacher, falsely stated that their fictional brother had pushed a student and expressed concern for their future; the union administrators they were speaking to reassured them. In the second video, the administrator referenced a teacher who had been accused of fourth-degree criminal sexual contact with a 16-year-old student, stating that they had successfully defended them; in reality, the teacher had pled guilty. The union attempted to force the administrator in question to resign, but an arbitrator blocked this decision, ruling it "too harsh a penalty" for their statements.

=== Internal Google documents (2019) ===
In 2019, a former software engineer, Zachary Vorhies, released internal Google documents to Project Veritas regarding the 2016 presidential election. CNBC reviewed the documents and reported that "the documents do not appear to contain any outright allegation of vote manipulation or attempts to bias the election." Google declined to comment on the material.

CNBC reported that among other things, the documents appeared to include lists related to how Google determines whether news sources are credible or whether they contain hate speech, which Project Veritas purported to indicate bias in search rankings. In response to a tweet by Donald Trump, in which he claimed, without evidence, that Google manipulated 2.6 million votes favoring Hillary Clinton in the 2016 election, a Google spokesperson reiterated a previous statement that Google has "never re-ranked or altered search results to manipulate political sentiment."

=== ABC not broadcasting Jeffrey Epstein accuser (2019) ===
In 2019, Project Veritas accused ABC News of suppressing a 2015 interview with a key accuser of the alleged sex trafficker Jeffrey Epstein. Project Veritas obtained a recording of ABC news anchor Amy Robach in an unguarded moment lamenting that her interview had never been broadcast. Robach and an ABC official say the story lacked sufficient corroboration at that time.

=== Minnesota videos (2020) ===
In September 2020, Project Veritas and O'Keefe had repeatedly promoted the release of material supposedly showing evidence of voter fraud, with September 28 being the promoted release date. On September 27, Mike Lindell, honorary chairman of President Trump's re-election campaign in Minnesota, abruptly announced that the release date was changed to that very day, within hours of The New York Times publishing information on its investigation of the tax returns of Donald Trump. Researchers at Stanford University and the University of Washington concluded that the change in timing was likely connected to the Times story.

O'Keefe began releasing the material on Twitter on September 27, in video form. Within seven minutes, Donald Trump Jr., the son of the president, separately uploaded the video to Twitter, instead of re-sharing the video from O'Keefe's account. Two minutes later, an account for Trump's re-election campaign re-shared the video, while Trump himself soon began responding. Additionally, Trump Jr. uploaded the video to Facebook earlier than O'Keefe. These events present "questions of coordination" on whether the Trump campaign "had access to the video before the general public", stated the researchers from the two universities. In addition, several well-known right-wing Twitter accounts both promoted the release of the material, and immediately shared the Twitter video upon release, leading to researchers concluding that this was "a great example of what a coordinated disinformation campaign looks like".

Project Veritas alleged that the material they released showed that Minnesota's Representative Ilhan Omar was connected to a cash-for-ballot harvesting scheme. Fact-checking website Snopes wrote that the videos "lack evidence to support this accusation", and that they included "clips of conversations that raise questions about the original context and intent of the words spoken." Snopes requested that Project Veritas release its raw, unedited footage, but Project Veritas refused. Snopes also could not verify the accuracy of the Somali to English translations done by Project Veritas. USA Today offered a similar assessment in their fact-check, stating that the Project Veritas material provides "no actual proof of fraud or any relationship between individuals in the video and Omar or her campaign". The New York Times wrote that the Project Veritas used only unidentified sources, and provided "no verifiable evidence that Representative Ilhan Omar's campaign had collected ballots illegally", writing that the story "was probably part of a coordinated disinformation effort".

The main material featured by Project Veritas were two videos uploaded to YouTube. The videos feature only one person who was both identified and interviewed on-camera: Omar Jamal. He describes himself as "part of the Ramsey County Sheriff's Office". The Office stated that Omar Jamal was part of the community support group, instead of being involved in policing activities. Omar Jamal was not speaking on behalf of the Office when he alleged voter fraud, stated the Office. Omar Jamal also mentions his leadership of the Somali Watchdog Group. Its website was created in August 2020, which mentions no other members of the organization other than Omar Jamal. The Daily Dot describes Omar Jamal as "uncredentialed" and "questionable", noting that he claimed to have studied at Tufts University Graduate School of International Affairs, but the school denied it. The Daily Dot also states that Omar Jamal is not the United Nations Permanent Representative to the Federal Republic of Somalia, as he has claimed. Shortly after the release of the videos, Jamal started soliciting for public donations on GoFundMe, asking for a total of $500,000 for legal defense funds and for "financial stability".

Project Veritas named the first YouTube video: Ilhan Omar connected Ballot Harvester in cash-for-ballots scheme: 'Car is full' of absentee ballots. This video featured Snapchat clips of Liban Osman, a man from Minneapolis. Liban Osman never mentions Ilhan Omar, but does refer to his brother, Jamal Osman, a Minneapolis City Councilman. In different Snapchat clips, Mohamed separately makes reference to the topics of money and ballots, although he never says he received money to collect ballots. Ballot harvesting is legal in Minnesota, and there was no limit on collecting absentee ballots in Minnesota from late July 2020 to early September 2020. FOX 9 received the full Snapchat clips from Liban Osman, who alleged that Project Veritas had edited and combined the videos to take them out of context. FOX 9 described the full clips as showing that Liban Osman was working for his brother, not Ilhan Omar. The full Snapchat clips also showed that when Liban Osman discussed money in politics, he was referring to his brother's competitors in Minneapolis' Ward 6 election, many of whom had little-funded campaigns. Liban Osman told FOX 9 that he rejected a $10,000 bribe by Omar Jamal to say that Liban Osman was offering to pay people to vote for Ilhan Omar.

The second YouTube video uploaded on this topic by Project Veritas was entitled Omar Connected Harvester SEEN Exchanging $200 for General Election Ballot. 'We don't care illegal.' However, Snopes states that it is "unclear what's going on. All one sees in the video is two unidentified men speaking Somali in an outdoor setting, discussing filling out a voter registration form. At one point, money allegedly changes hands." FOX 9 heard from two sources that the two men in the above incident are Omar Jamal and a relative of his, and that what Omar Jamal was doing was passing his relative $200 to transfer to the family of another relative, who was sick in Somalia.

As a result of the videos, the Minneapolis Police is "looking into the validity" of the allegations. Sahan Journal reported that Omar Jamal had later given an interview where he stated that he had not met any person who was paid to vote, which would contradict what he told Project Veritas.

=== Pennsylvania postal worker video (2020) ===
Project Veritas released a video where a Pennsylvania postal worker in Erie claimed, without evidence, that on November 5, the Erie postmaster told a postal supervisor "that they messed up yesterday", because "they had postmarked one of the ballots the fourth instead of the third, because they were supposed to put them for the third".

On November 10, officials of the Postal Service Office of Inspector General told members of Congress that the postal worker had recanted the claims to investigators. Shortly afterwards, multiple news reports reported that the postal worker, Richard Hopkins, told investigators from the U.S. Postal Service's Office of Inspector General that his allegations were not true and had signed an affidavit recanting his claims. Hopkins initially denied that he had recanted his allegations; however, he had no comment when the final Postmaster's General report and audio recordings from his interview confirmed that he had done so.

Also on November 11, Project Veritas released a two-hour audio recording purportedly of the conversation between Hopkins and the investigators. The Washington Post described it as "not clear" if Project Veritas had edited the audio recording before release. In the recording, Hopkins is heard saying that Project Veritas wrote his affidavit for him. Additionally, Hopkins recounted that when he was interacting with Project Veritas, he was in "so much shock [he] wasn't paying that much attention to what they were telling me". Hopkins says in the audio that he heard parts of a conversation, with the specific phrases he heard being "ballots on the 4th", "all for the 3rd", and "one postmarked on the 4th". Hopkins acknowledged in the audio that he had not heard the word "backdate".

The Postal Service inspector general investigated and released a report in March 2021 confirming that Hopkins had recanted the account and finding no evidence to support his original claim. Project Veritas continued to promote the postal worker's claims of fraud after they had been discredited.

The postmaster sued Hopkins, Project Veritas and O'Keefe for defamation in 2021. In February 2024, O'Keefe and Project Veritas settled the lawsuit, with O'Keefe admitting in a statement that he was "aware of no evidence or other allegation that election fraud occurred in the Erie Post Office during the 2020 Presidential Election." Hopkins, in a statement, said he had been wrong and apologized.

=== Texas campaign worker (2020) ===
On January 13, 2021, Raquel Rodriguez, a former campaign worker was arrested and charged with election tampering, after Project Veritas posted an edited video of the woman, in which she appears to be helping an elderly person fill out a mail-in ballot form and discussing assisting people at the polls. Rodriguez stated that she is the niece of the woman she is seen on video with, and has moved to have charges dismissed on the grounds that it is not unlawful to help relatives vote.

=== New Hampshire double-voter (2020) ===
Project Veritas released a hidden camera video alleging a voter in New Hampshire had voted twice (once under an assumed name) in 2016. The person had been investigated by the New Hampshire State Police and referred to the state Attorney General in 2020, but the investigation languished unresolved until Project Veritas pursued the matter with the Attorney General's office. The man pled guilty to a felony of voting twice and was sentenced to 90 days in jail, which was suspended. He also pled guilty and was fined for a civil violation of applying for and receiving a ballot using a false name. The voter had been appointed an Inspector of Elections, someone who assists in the polling place during an election, although the appointment was rescinded following Project Veritas' reporting.

=== PBS lawyer video (2021) ===
In January 2021, Project Veritas released a recording where a lawyer for PBS makes strongly partisan remarks on politics and the COVID-19 pandemic in what appear to be a barroom conversation. The lawyer resigned. PBS issued a statement which said, "This employee no longer works for PBS. As a mid-level staff attorney, he did not speak on behalf of our organization, nor did he make any editorial decisions... There is no place for hateful rhetoric at PBS, and this individual’s views in no way reflect our values or opinions... We strongly condemn violence and will continue to do what we have done for 50 years – use our national platform and local presence to strengthen communities and bring people together."

=== Pfizer video (2023) ===
In January 2023, Project Veritas released an undercover video of a man identified as a Pfizer executive named Jordon Trishton Walker, who was supposedly a "Director of Research and Development, Strategic Operations and mRNA Scientific Planning" at the company. Walker claimed that Pfizer was considering experiments that involved "mutating" the SARS-CoV-2 virus to prepare vaccines ahead of time in a manner similar to gain-of-function research. Walker also claimed that what Pfizer was allegedly doing was similar to what allegedly happened at the Wuhan Institute of Virology in the lab leak theory of COVID-19's origin, and appeared to reference debunked claims about the impact of the COVID-19 vaccine on female fertility, saying that he "hopes we don't find out that somehow this mRNA lingers in the body."

Pfizer denied the allegations in the video, stating that it had not done any "gain of function or directed evolution research" during its development of its COVID-19 vaccine. Multiple scientists told FactCheck.org that Walker appeared to be uninformed, and the experiments supposedly discussed at Pfizer made little sense for the company to conduct. In another video released by Project Veritas on January 26, Walker admitted to not being a scientist by background, and said in a confrontation with the group, "I was trying to impress a date. By lying. Why are you doing this to someone who's just working at a company to literally help the public?"

Footage from the Project Veritas undercover video was included in the 2023 anti-vaccine film Final Days.

=== EPA Greenhouse Gas Reduction Fund (2024) ===
In late 2024 a Project Veritas release alleged that the EPA had mismanaged 2022 Inflation Reduction Act funds appropriated for greenhouse gas reduction programs run by non-profit organizations. An EPA staffer, recorded unaware in a social setting in late 2024, explained how the EPA had been working to commit remaining funds quickly. The law specified the funds needed to be committed by September 30, 2024, which was considered a tight deadline. Referencing the Project Veritas release, the new administration's EPA administrator Lee Zeldin announced the agency would try to claw back some of the funds. A Justice Department investigation found no wrong-doing, a federal judge found that the EPA did not demonstrate misconduct had occurred, and the administration's lawyers acknowledged in internal memos that the claims were misguided.

== Notable incidents ==
=== Senator Mary Landrieu (2010) ===
O'Keefe and colleagues were arrested in the Hale Boggs Federal Complex in New Orleans in January 2010 and charged with entering federal property under false pretenses with the intent of committing a felony, at the office of United States Senator Mary Landrieu, a Democrat. His three fellow activists, who were dressed as telephone repairmen when apprehended, included Robert Flanagan, the son of William Flanagan, acting U.S. Attorney of the Eastern District of Louisiana. The four men were charged with malicious intent to damage the phone system. O'Keefe stated that he had entered Landrieu's office to investigate complaints that she was ignoring phone calls from constituents during the debate over President Barack Obama's health care bill.

The charges in the case were reduced from a felony to a single misdemeanor count of entering a federal building under false pretenses. O'Keefe and the others pleaded guilty on May 26. O'Keefe was sentenced to three years' probation, 100 hours of community service and a $1,500 fine. The other three men received lesser sentences.

In August 2013, O'Keefe revisited the incident by releasing a video entitled: "a confrontation with former U.S. Attorney Jim Letten on the campus of Tulane University". Letten is a former Republican U.S. Attorney who recused himself from the Landrieu incident because he knew the father of one of the men involved. The video shows Letten accusing O'Keefe of "terrorizing" Letten's wife at their home, of harassing him, and trespassing on the Tulane campus. He called O'Keefe a "coward" and a "spud", and referred to O'Keefe and his companions as "hobbits" and "scum".

=== Abbie Boudreau (2010) ===
In August 2010, O'Keefe planned a staged encounter with the CNN correspondent Abbie Boudreau, who was doing a documentary on the young conservative movement. He set up an appointment at his office in Maryland to discuss a video shoot. Izzy Santa, executive director of Project Veritas, approached Boudreau when she arrived at the site. Santa warned Boudreau that O'Keefe was planning to meet with her on board a nearby boat, where he would try to seduce Boudreau. This would be filmed on hidden cameras. Boudreau did not board the boat and soon left the area.

CNN later published a 13-page plan written by O'Keefe mentor Ben Wetmore. It listed props for the boat scheme, including pornography, sexual aids, condoms, a blindfold and "fuzzy" handcuffs. When questioned by CNN, O'Keefe denied he was going to follow the Wetmore plan, as he found parts of it inappropriate. Boudreau commented "that does not appear to be true, according to a series of emails we obtained from Izzy Santa, who says the e-mails reveal James' true intentions."

Following the Boudreau incident, Project Veritas paid Izzy Santa a five-figure settlement after she threatened to sue, which included a nondisclosure agreement.

=== Attempt to solicit Colorado voter fraud (2014) ===
In October 2014, O'Keefe and his two colleagues attempted to bait staffers for Congressman Jared Polis (D-CO) and then-U.S. Senator Mark Udall (D-CO), as well as independent expenditure organizations, into approving voter fraud, according to several staffers who interacted with O'Keefe and his colleagues. Staffers began photographing O'Keefe's crew and advising them that what they were advocating was illegal; one nonprofit said they contacted police.

The 2013 Colorado election modernization act had required that all registered voters receive mail-in ballots. PV released a video showing a few individuals appearing to be OK with illegal suggestions PV's people proffered, e.g. finding and voting discarded ballots. But no evidence of illegal activity was shown.

=== Attempted sting of Open Society Foundations (2016) ===
On March 16, 2016, O'Keefe attempted to call Open Society Foundations under the assumed name of Victor Kesh, describing himself as attached to "a foundation" seeking to "get involved with you and aid what you do in fighting for European values". O'Keefe forgot to hang up after recording the voicemail, and several more minutes of audio were recorded, revealing that he was attached to Discover the Networks and planning a series of attempts to create embarrassing videos or other recordings of targeted groups.

=== Failed attempt to sting The Washington Post (2017) ===
Beginning in July 2017, Project Veritas operative Jaime Phillips attempted to infiltrate The Washington Post and other media outlets by joining networking groups related to journalism and left-leaning politics. She and a male companion attended events related to the Post, and their conversations with journalists were sometimes covertly recorded.

In November 2017, The Washington Post reported that several women accused Republican Alabama U.S. Senate candidate Roy Moore of pursuing them while they were teenagers and he was in his 30s. Later that same month, Jaime Phillips approached The Washington Post and falsely claimed that Moore had impregnated her as a teenager and that she had an abortion. In conducting its usual fact-checking, the Post discovered multiple red flags in her story. They found a GoFundMe page in her name that said, "I've accepted a job to work in the conservative media movement to combat the lies and deceipt [sic] of the liberal MSM." After a Post reporter confronted her with the inconsistencies during a video-recorded interview, Phillips denied that she was working with an organization that targets journalists, and said that she no longer wanted to do the story. She was seen outside Project Veritas' office in Mamaroneck, New York, with her car remaining at the office's parking lot for more than an hour. O'Keefe declined to comment about the woman's apparent connection to Project Veritas. Instead of running a story about Phillips' supposed pregnancy, the Post published an article about the attempted sting operation. The Post decided to disclose Phillips' original discussions made off the record, saying that Phillips' lies voided any agreement to keep those disclosures confidential.

Hours after the Post published this story, O'Keefe released a video which he claimed exposed the newspaper's liberal bias. The video includes undercover footage of conversations with two Post employees, national security reporter Dan Lamothe and product director Joey Marburger. These employees explained to undercover Project Veritas operatives the difference between the news reporting of The Washington Post (which calls out the Trump administration's missteps while giving "him credit where there's credit" due) and the Post's opinion editorials; O'Keefe said that this exposed the Washington Post's "hidden agenda".

O'Keefe was criticized for his failed sting, and The Washington Post was praised. Rod Dreher of The American Conservative praised the Post and called on conservative donors to stop giving money to O'Keefe's outfit. Dan McLaughlin of the conservative National Review said that O'Keefe's sting was an "own goal" and that O'Keefe was doing a disservice to the conservative movement; Jim Geraghty of the National Review made a similar assessment. Byron York of The Washington Examiner said that O'Keefe's "idiocy" was "beyond boneheaded", and that "O'Keefe really ought to hang it up." Ben Shapiro, the conservative editor in chief of The Daily Wire, said that the botched sting was "horrible, both morally and effectively". Conor Friedersdorf of The Atlantic wrote, "If James O'Keefe respected the right-wing populists who make up the audience of Project Veritas ... he would tell them the truth about all of the organizations that he targets. Instead, Project Veritas operates in bad faith, an attribute it demonstrated again this week in the aftermath of its bungled attempt to trick The Washington Post." Noah Rothman of the conservative magazine Commentary chastised O'Keefe for being exploitative of his audience: "No longer are institutions like Veritas dedicated to combating ignorance in their audience. They're actively courting it."

Jonathan Chait of New York magazine said that O'Keefe, having set out to prove that the Post was fake news, ended up disproving it. O'Keefe's plot collapsed because it was premised on a ludicrously false worldview, wrote Chait. "The Washington Post does not, in fact, publish unverified accusations just because they're against Republicans." O'Keefe's attempts to prove rampant voter fraud have failed "because voter fraud is not rampant".

In 2018, The Washington Post was awarded the Pulitzer Prize for Investigative Reporting for its coverage of the allegations against Moore, including its exposé of the unsuccessful Project Veritas sting.

=== Attempted stings of perceived enemies of President Trump ===
The New York Times reported in May 2021 that multiple operatives from Project Veritas were involved in a scheme to discredit FBI employees and other officials who they viewed to be enemies of President Trump. Living out of a large shared home in Georgetown, women employed by Project Veritas went on dates with FBI employees in an attempt to secretly record them denigrating Trump. National Security Advisor H. R. McMaster was a primary target of this operation, though efforts against him ended in March 2018 when McMaster resigned his position.

=== Nurse Jodi O'Malley unproven claims on COVID-19 vaccines in a series of videos (2021) ===
Project Veritas released a series of videos, starting on September 20, 2021, and finishing on October 6, 2021, with millions of views on YouTube, showing nurse Jodi O'Malley, who works for the Indian Health Service in Arizona, speaking with a doctor identified as Maria Gonzales. Gonzales can be heard saying: "All this is bullshit. Now, [a patient] probably [has] myocarditis due to the vaccine. But now, they are not going to blame the vaccine, they are not reporting it. They want to shove it under the mat." Claims that the Vaccine Adverse Event Reporting System (VAERS) fails to register reports are misleading. VAERS, which currently contains over 720,000 reports, was designed for purposes of early warning and it may contain "incomplete, inaccurate, coincidental, or unverifiable" information. Despite minor challenges, data from VAERS still is helpful to health regulators such as the CDC and the FDA in their search for vaccine-related adverse effects.

=== FBI searches relating to theft of Ashley Biden diary ===
The New York Times reported in November 2021 that the FBI raided the homes of Project Veritas employees as part of a Justice Department investigation into the theft and publication of the diary of Ashley Biden, a daughter of President Joe Biden. The right-wing website National File published what it claimed to be the contents of the diary on October 26, 2020. The FBI also raided O'Keefe's apartment. O'Keefe confirmed that the FBI searched the homes of current and former employees. In a video statement, O'Keefe said Project Veritas chose not to publish the diary because it could not be authenticated. O'Keefe also said Project Veritas returned the diary to law enforcement and attempted to return it to one of Biden's lawyers, who had "refused to authenticate it".

On November 14, 2021, the American Civil Liberties Union published a statement in response to the raid:

Project Veritas has engaged in disgraceful deceptions, and reasonable observers might not consider their activities to be journalism at all. Nevertheless, the precedent set in this case could have serious consequences for press freedom. Unless the government had good reason to believe that Project Veritas employees were directly involved in the criminal theft of the diary, it should not have subjected them to invasive searches and seizures. We urge the court to appoint a special master to ensure that law enforcement officers review only those materials that were lawfully seized and that are directly relevant to a legitimate criminal investigation.

— Brian Hauss, senior staff attorney with the ACLU's Speech, Privacy, and Technology Project

The Committee to Protect Journalists, while clarifying that "we do not endorse some of the tactics Project Veritas employs", expressed concern that lacking "a clear link between members of Project Veritas and allegations of criminal activities" the FBI raids and seizure of evidence were a "dangerous precedent that could allow law enforcement to search and confiscate reporters' unpublished source material in vague attempts to identify whistleblowers".

In December 2021, a federal judge appointed Barbara Jones to serve as a special master to ensure prosecutors could not access materials protected by attorney-client privilege and that the group's First Amendment rights as a media organization were protected. Project Veritas issued a letter to the special master in March 2022, alleging that the Justice Department subverted First Amendment protections and secretly seized Veritas' internal emails. Veritas further alleged that the Justice Department issued gag orders to Microsoft, the host of the emails, barring them from revealing the seizures to Veritas.

In August 2022, Florida residents Aimee Harris and Robert Kurlander pleaded guilty in federal court to stealing the diary and other items belonging to Ashley Biden, and selling them to Project Veritas. The two agreed to cooperate with the Justice Department's investigation into how the diary was acquired by Project Veritas.

== Funding and organization ==
Much of the funding for Project Veritas comes from anonymous donations through Donors Trust, a conservative, American nonprofit donor-advised fund backed by the Koch brothers, which according to its promotional materials, says that it will "keep your charitable giving private, especially gifts funding sensitive or controversial issues". Donors Trust provided Project Veritas with gradually increasing cash infusions, including $25,000 in 2011, $922,500 in 2015, $1.7 million in 2016, and over $4 million in 2019.

Other prominent donors included the Donald J. Trump Foundation, which donated $20,000 in 2015, including a $10,000 transfer in May 2015, which was made a month before the launch of Donald Trump's presidential campaign. O'Keefe attended, as a guest of the Trump campaign, the final presidential debate, and was later available in the spin room following the Las Vegas event.

The group is a 501(c)(3) tax-exempt organization. The group's political branch is Project Veritas Action (also known as the Project Veritas Action Fund), a 501(c)(4) organization.

The Daily Dot reported that they found a pattern in which Project Veritas' supposed whistleblowers "almost all establish crowdfunding pages hyped by Project Veritas within days and hours of going public with their allegations." The Daily Dot provided seven examples in 2019 or 2020: Richard Hopkins, Zach McElroy, Eric Cochran, Cary Poarch, Greg Copolla, Ryan Hartwig, and Omar Jamal, who each raised between $20,000 to over $115,000 on GoFundMe, although in some instances, the money was not disbursed.

In January 2022, the British anti-disinformation organization Logically reported that Project Veritas relied on the Christian crowdfunding site GiveSendGo to raise money for its supposed whistleblowers.

== Journalism and Project Veritas ==
In the aftermath of the 2022 FBI raid on O'Keefe, Project Veritas said they did journalism and could invoke First Amendment rights that protect members of news media. According to Columbia Journalism Review "the Justice Manual, a departmental handbook, doesn't directly define who qualifies as news media, and thus receives those protections, instead favoring a case-by-case approach. To make its evaluation, the department employs a 'News Media Policy Consultation' form, which (as revealed by a Freedom of Information Act lawsuit filed by Timm and the Knight First Amendment Institute at Columbia University) lays out twelve factors for law enforcement agents to consider, including whether the individual possesses press credentials and whether they 'primarily [report] facts, as opposed to expressing opinion'. ... In the case of Veritas, according to filings, prosecutors determined that O'Keefe didn't meet its standards for news media."
