= The Centurion (magazine) =

Online magazine of Rutgers University

Rutgers Centurion
- Type: Monthly student magazine
- Format: Magazine
- Owner(s): The Centurion at Rutgers, Inc.
- Publisher: University Publishing Solutions LLC
- Editor-in-chief: Aviv Khavich '19
- Managing editor: Andrea Vacchiano '19
- Founded: 2004 (Restarted in 2017)
- Political alignment: Conservative/Right-wing
- Headquarters: New Brunswick, NJ 08901

The Centurion is a conservative online magazine focused on Rutgers University-New Brunswick campus life.

Its motto is "veritas vos liberabit," which is Latin for "the truth shall set you free." The magazine attempts to counterbalance that which its staff perceive as a predominant orthodoxy of social liberalism and political progressivism of the professors and staff at the university. They believe this is confirmed by documented faculty donations to political candidates in the 2004 presidential election.

The Centurion was founded in September 2004 by James O'Keefe, a junior philosophy major, after he left The Daily Targum. It was co-founded by fellow Rutgers college students Matthew Klimek, Joseph P. Nedick and Mason-Gross art student Justine Mertz.

== Overview ==
The Centurion has featured cover stories on Rutgers alumnus Paul Robeson, academic freedom, eminent domain in New Brunswick, New Jersey, the secret society Cap and Skull, the Jyllands-Posten Muhammad cartoons controversy and the Rutgers College Governing Association. Mostly, it focuses on campus fraud and due diligence issues, claiming in its mission statement to be a remedy to "excessive political correctness and corruption at Rutgers." But it has recently taken on national topics. On foreign policy issues, the journal often takes a neoconservative stance. Domestically, it echoes paleoconservative sentiments, often railing against abortion on demand, gun control and illegal immigration.

The magazine is known for its walk-in video reports. In one video the editors of The Centurion attempted to ban Lucky Charms from Brower Dining Hall on the grounds the breakfast cereal was "offensive" to Irish-Americans. This was explained by conservative columnist Greg Walker, who took part in the exercise A specifically an ironic reaction to the targeting of sandwich names at the privately owned Grease Trucks by the Rutgers LGBT community. School staff met with those whom complained about the "offensive" breakfast cereal as a matter of requirement to follow up on all complaints, no further action was taken on the matter.

The Centurion is a member of the Collegiate Network. Although officially recognized by Rutgers, The Centurion incorporated as a New Jersey 501(c)(3) for liability and financial reasons, and maintains a board of directors.

=== Revival of publication ===
The Centurion was restarted by student Aviv Khavich in 2017. Khavich was a former columnist for The Daily Targum. It maintained an online presence through October 2018 before ceasing activity.

== Controversy ==
The Centurion held counterprotests and has held an affirmative action bake sale four times. It prints specific names and pictures of "liberal" students in its issues from Facebook. In a matter subject to privacy implications, the paper has printed names of students who have "liberal" adornments on their dormitory doors. The magazine's inaugural headline was "Conservatives Launch Publication at Rutgers: Intolerant Diversity-Haters Promote Fanatical Agenda." Since then it has had such tongue-in-cheek headlines as "Mayor of New Orleans doesn't care about Black People" after Hurricane Katrina and "Abandon all Hope Ye Who Enter Here," over the campus gate; a spin-off of one of the cantons in the Divine Comedy and one of the covers for the National Review.

=== "Awards" ===
The magazine gives sarcastic "awards" to faculty and students for holding views which the staff of the Centurion consider "liberal". One such award, for "Liberal of the Month," was given to English department professor Richard Dienst. The editors printed a private letter from Professor Dienst to the Dean of Rutgers College requesting that "disciplinary action" be taken against O'Keefe and Mertz. This occurred after they confronted Professor Dienst with a video camera and asked him if he believed in the United States Constitution, since he supposedly told a dissenting Republican student "You have no first amendment rights." After the editors obtained the disciplinary letter, they printed it on page 18 of the October 2005 issue. In another instance the editors presented a certificate bearing the "Centurion Award" to a history professor with the most pro-Democrat posters adorning his office door.

In late July, former editor in chief and founder James O'Keefe along with board member David Maxham set out to have the American flag hung up in every classroom at Rutgers. After approaching several deans, including Co-Vice Chair Brian Rose, the boys were told such an act would be "problematic" and that hanging up the American flag would give argument to others who would intend to adorn classrooms with their own symbols. Unsatisfied with the response, the students created a video, which caught the attention of the Jersey Guys on 101.5 FM. The issue was discussed as Centurion members Daniel Francisco and David Maxham fielded questions live on air on July 31, 2006. The radio show hosts shared the views of the students and pledged to help the Centurion on the issue.

=== Controversial issues of the magazine ===
Rutgers Centurion coat of arms

The third issue of the magazine depicted well-known Rutgers alumnus Paul Robeson and criticized his sympathy and support for the former Soviet Union. Robeson, a Lenin Peace Prize winner, has the Paul Robeson Cultural Center in New Brunswick as well as the Paul Robeson Library on the Camden campus named in his honor (in 2010 the College Republicans chapter at the Camden campus unsuccessfully called for the library to be renamed).

The magazine often points out that economist Milton Friedman, Rutgers '32, a winner of the Nobel Prize in Economics, and very influential in Chicago school of economics, has no facility named after him.

The March 2006 issue featured the infamous Danish cartoon depicting Muhammad.

== Centurion Editors-in-Chief ==
- 2004-2006 James O'Keefe
- 2007-2008 Dan Bigos
- 2009 Kyle Barry
- 2010 Jordan Romvary
- 2017-2019 Aviv Khavich
