= The Daily Targum =

Rutgers University Daily student newspaper, in print since 1867

Coordinates: 40.496619°N 74.442496°W

- Type: Daily student newspaper
- Format: Tabloid
- Publisher: Targum Publishing Company
- Editor-in-chief: Kieran McCann
- Managing editor: Meghna Mallya
- News editor: Gianna Puglisi, Mia Fardin
- Founded: 1867
- Headquarters: 613 George St; New Brunswick, NJ 08901
- Country: United States
- Circulation: 5,000 (as of 2017)
- OCLC number: 16045609
- Website: www.dailytargum.com

The Daily Targum is the official student newspaper of Rutgers University. Founded in 1867, it is the second-oldest collegiate newspaper in the United States. The Daily Targum is student written and managed, and boasts a circulation of 5,000 in 2017. In its current form, it exists as a bi-fold tabloid-style paper featuring international, national, local, and university news, as well as editorials, columns, comics, classifieds, sports, and other amusements. In 1980, the paper achieved independence from the University, establishing a non-profit organization, the Targum Publishing Company, which now oversees all areas of the paper. The Daily Targum is published Monday through Thursday and on Sundays while classes are in session, in New Brunswick, New Jersey.

In 2006, publishing of The Newark Targum began (and ended), having served the Rutgers–Newark campus for four issues. CNBC personality Rebecca Quick served as the newspaper's editor-in-chief for a period, before joining The Wall Street Journal. AVN personality David Aaron Clark had previously served as the newspaper's editor-in-chief for a period.

== Targum timeline ==
1866: Then Rutgers President William H. Campbell lectures to Rutgers men on the original text of the Old Testament, including Aramaic language paraphrases of the Hebrew Scriptures, called Targums. The word "Targum" means interpretation in Aramaic and is used as a slang word when referring to crib sheets, among various Aramaic terms that become part of the campus vernacular. This is the inspiration for the name of the forthcoming periodical.

1867: The Targum first appears as a four-page publication, the forerunner of the Scarlet Letter Yearbook.

1869: On Jan. 29 the Targum begins publishing as a monthly newspaper and literary magazine. It includes campus news, poetry, humor and essays on literature, science, philosophy, religion and travel. This same year Rutgers hosts the first intercollegiate football game with Princeton University, which Rutgers wins (and The Targum dutifully reports), 6–4.

1880: The Targum begins printing once every three weeks.

1891: The Targum becomes a weekly publication.

1919: The format changes from an 8 1/2" by 11" format to an 11" by 17" tabloid size.

1927: The first annual spoof issue of the Targum, the Mugrat (Targum spelled backwards) is printed. The issue reports that a Rutgers professor has been held in the county jail, charged with cruelty to animals.

1954: The Targum is printed four times a week.

1956: The newspaper becomes a daily publication, printing five days a week.

1969: Letterpress printing off-campus abandoned in favor of photo-offset print shop run by students on campus.

1970: Targum staff threatens strike if editors appoint new editorial board without staff input. Staff election of editors established through Targum caucus. Tony Mauro elected editor-in-chief over prior editors' choice.

1978: The Targum staff strikes after demands for honoraria are not met.

1980: The Targum Publishing Company files its papers of incorporation on July 1, 1980, following a year of negotiations with the University and an arduously fought battle to pass the student vote for funding. Students now fund the Targum directly through a refundable fee on their term bills.

1983: Typewriters are discarded as the first computers enter the Targum's newsroom.

1996: The Targum goes online.

1998: In January of this year, the Targum begins using full color on the front and back pages on a daily basis.

2002: The productions staff leaves film behind as the newspaper begins fully electronic publication.

2004: The "Happy Hour" comic strip begins appearing in the paper on November 30, originally created by Jim Kohl.

2006: The first issue of The Newark Targum is launched on February 15, 2006. A total of four issues were published; then it folded.

2008: The first video is posted on the Daily Targum website. Source: Celebrating 25 Years of Independence, by Theresa Poulson. pgs. 6–7. May 2005. 2009: Regular videos and audio slideshows begin to be posted on the Targum website.

2011: The Daily Targum increases circulation to 18,000 papers Monday through Thursday, and 15,500 on Friday. The Targum website also switches to Town News CMS web hosting, launches a Tumblr account (in addition to its Facebook and Twitter pages), and gets set to launch a mobile app for iPhones and Androids.

2013: The Daily Targum began live streaming, beginning with the March 12 Strategic Planning Town Hall with University President Robert L. Barchi — the first on the New Brunswick campus.

2019: The Daily Targum was unsuccessful in its triennial referendum, failing to pass the vote across all eight voting units polled. The vote amassed less than 30% of the total eligible undergraduate student voting population. The Targum saw a reduction in funding of about 75% through student fees. The Targum responded by cutting its Friday print publication, decreasing its circulation to 5,000, and taking on a digital-first approach.

2020: The Daily Targum transitioned into a fully digital publication. They no longer publish newspapers and only publish their articles on their website and social media pages.

== Referendum ==
In order to secure student funding for the Daily Targum, the newspaper is required to hold a referendum every three years. Since 1980, the Daily Targum has sought to receive "yes" votes from 25% of the students at each University division in order to receive funding from all the students in that division. On May 13, 2019, the Daily Targum announced it had failed to receive the necessary votes for the referendum to pass and for the paper to continue to receive funding through student fees. 22 years prior, economist Milton Friedman, class of '32, stated in a full page Targum ad against funding sports at the expense of supporting student newspapers.

== The Newark Targum ==
The Newark Targum was a weekly student newspaper published by the Targum Publishing Company for the student population of the Newark campus of Rutgers University. It had a weekly circulation of 5,000 copies, printed each Wednesday during the academic year. It existed as a bi-fold tabloid-sized newspaper, similar to the Daily Targum (the daily newspaper at Rutgers University published since 1869 on the university's main campus in New Brunswick, New Jersey).

Content of The Newark Targum s generated largely by student editors and reporters based at the Rutgers–Newark campus and at Rutgers' main campus in New Brunswick. Some content was shared between The Newark Targum and the Daily Targum, especially with regards to issues relevant to the university community. The Newark Targum also printed content from The Associated Press, most notably on page 2 in the World Briefs column and occasionally in the sports section.

The first issue of The Newark Targum was printed on February 15, 2006. Mid-fall semester 2005 an e-mail was sent to business manager Brad Whitson asking for The Daily Targum to be delivered to the Rutgers–Newark campus. From that e-mail a discussion between Whitson and editor-in-chief Nick Sevilis ensued, first focused on the logistics of transporting the daily paper to Newark from New Brunswick, and ending with a discussion of the logistics of creating a second newspaper with Rutgers–Newark as its main focus. Though little stock was placed in such a grand plan by either person, planning moved ahead swiftly as little resistance was met in the form of financial constraints by the printing and delivery companies. Promising too was the positive reaction from Rutgers–Newark students and administration. With a tentative budget set, the four student executives went to the company's Board of Trustees, which approved a test run of four issues. The paper received approval to continue printing until the end of the Fall 2006 semester, when it was discontinued.

Newark Targum published four issues in 2006, with an average circulation of 5,000.

== See also ==
- Rutgers University
- Rutgers University student organizations
- Rutgers Centurion
