= Abbie Boudreau =

American journalist and TV personality

- Born: Abbie Marie Boudreau; April 14, 1978 (age 47); Kankakee, Illinois, U.S.
- Education: Northwestern University
- Occupation(s): ABC correspondent (present); CNN correspondent (2007–10)

Abbie Marie Boudreau (born April 14, 1978) is an American ABC television news correspondent. She joined ABC in November 2010. She was formerly with CNN. She has received seven regional Emmys for investigative reporting, writing and enterprise journalism. She also received regional Edward R. Murrow awards in both 2006 and 2007. Since joining ABC Abbie has received three national Emmy Awards, a national Edward R. Murrow award and a Gracie award for her ensemble work on Good Morning America.

== Early career ==
Abbie grew up in Bourbonnais, Illinois and attended Bradley Bourbonnais Community High School before attending Loyola University in Chicago earning her bachelor's and a master's degree in broadcast journalism from Northwestern University. Prior to joining CNN Boudreau worked at KWWL-TV in Waterloo, Iowa, WWMT-TV in Kalamazoo, MI, and KNXV-TV in Phoenix, AZ.

== CNN ==
At CNN, she was the host for many documentaries including Campus Rage and Joe Biden Revealed. She also co-hosted a one-hour special called Fall of the Fat Cats. In a four-month investigation, she revealed how, over two years, the Federal Emergency Management Agency (FEMA) had stored $85 million worth of new household supplies that were meant for Hurricane Katrina victims, but ended up giving them away to various government agencies, such as prisons. The investigation, "Hurricane Giveaway", prompted the return of many of those items to Louisiana, where victims still needed basic supplies. The series was nominated for a national Emmy award. The story was also a finalist in the Investigative Reporters and Editors (IRE) awards.

In 2010, she hosted Saturday and Sunday mornings on CNN. On October 6, 2008, she attempted to get Richard S. Fuld, Jr., CEO of Lehman Brothers, to answer questions about his $22 million in bonuses alone for 2007, on his way to testify in front of a committee hearing on Capitol Hill. The same day the stock market plunged 800 points.

She won a first place National Headliner Award for "Post Office Mansion", which revealed how the U.S. Postal Service was losing millions by buying the expensive homes of relocating employees. She also won the Livingston Award for Young Journalists for the documentary Killings At The Canal: The Army Tapes, which aired in November 2009. In 2011, the documentary won the gold medal for investigative reports in the New York Film Festival awards as well as the CINE Golden Eagle Award. One month after her investigation into the controversial 96-hour rule, which required NATO soldiers to release suspects or turn them over to Afghan authorities after 96 hours, the U.S. Department of Defense announced it was doing away with the rule and putting a new policy in place.

In late September 2010, CNN published details of James O'Keefe's attempt to embarrass CNN and Boudreau by enticing her onto a boat for a meeting about an upcoming interview. The plan was foiled when Izzy Santa, the executive director of O'Keefe's organization Project Veritas warned Boudreau. At ABC, she contributes entertainment and lifestyle reports to Good Morning America and Nightline as well as other ABC platforms.
