= European Journalism Training Association =

Formal network of authorized European journalism training centres

- Abbreviation: EJTA
- Formation: 1990
- Headquarters: Mechelen
- Website: ejta.eu

The European Journalism Training Association (EJTA) is a Belgian organization of European journalism training institutes, headquartered in Mechelen. As of 2026, The network has about 80 members from approximately 30 different European countries. The non-profit organisation was founded in Brussels in 1990.

Each year in October EJTA holds a general meeting and a seminar. In May, EJTA organizes the Teachers’ Training.
