= Journalism Studies =

Academic journal

- Discipline: Journalism
- Language: English
- Edited by: Folker Hanusch

Publication details
- History: 2000–present
- Publisher: Routledge on behalf of the European Journalism Training Association and the Journalism Studies Division of the International Communication Association
- Frequency: Bimonthly
- Impact factor: 3.741 (2020)

Standard abbreviations
- ISO 4: Journal. Stud.

Indexing
- ISSN: 1461-670X
- OCLC no.: 960789672

Links
- Journal homepage; Online access; Online archive

Journalism Studies is a bimonthly peer-reviewed academic journal covering communication studies as it pertains to journalism. It was established in 2000 by Bob Franklin (Cardiff University), who served as its editor-in-chief until stepping down in 2018. It is published by Routledge on behalf of the European Journalism Training Association, the European Communication Research and Education Association and the Journalism Studies Division of the International Communication Association. The current editor-in-chief is Folker Hanusch (University of Vienna). According to the Journal Citation Reports, the journal has a 2020 impact factor of 3.741.
