= Michael B. Colbert =

Michael B. Colbert is the director of the Ohio Department of Job and Family Services (ODJFS), a $20-plus billion agency with nearly 4,000 employees. ODJFS is the largest agency in the state and is responsible for supervising the state's public assistance, workforce development, unemployment compensation, child and adult protective services, adoption, child care, and child support programs. ODJFS also is the single state agency responsible for the administration of Ohio's Medicaid program. Colbert was the first minority appointment to the cabinet of Governor John Kasich.

Prior to joining Governor John R. Kasich's cabinet, Colbert served as the ODJFS chief fiscal officer for almost three years. In that role, he supervised the agency's adoption of the Ohio Administrative Knowledge system, Ohio's new financial system, and the County Finance Information System. Before joining ODJFS, Colbert was senior audit manager for the Ohio Auditor of State, where he worked for 15 years.

Colbert is a U.S. Army veteran and a graduate of Central State University in Wilberforce, Ohio, where he earned a bachelor's degree in finance and accounting. He is a member of the National Association of State Human Services Finance Officers, the Government Finance Officers Association and the Association of Government Accountants.

== Controversy ==
On August 1, 2012, four Members of Congress from Ohio sent Colbert a letter requesting that he take action to reduce his agency's "high percentage of improper denials of unemployment benefits" and "high underpayment rate for paid unemployment benefits claims".
