= Hale Boggs Federal Complex =

Building in the United States

- Interactive map of the Hale Boggs Federal Complex area

General information
- Location: 501-545 Magazine Street, New Orleans, United States
- Coordinates: 29°56′55″N 90°4′9″W
- Completed: 1976

Height
- Height: 62.18 meter

Technical details
- Floor count: 14

The Hale Boggs Federal Complex, also known as the Hale Boggs Federal Building-Courthouse, is a historic building in New Orleans, Louisiana. It was built in 1976. It was designed in the Modernist architectural style. It was named in honor of Democratic Congressman Hale Boggs who disappeared over Alaska in 1972.
