= List of United States Supreme Court cases, volume 49 =

Supreme Court of the United States
- Interactive map of Supreme Court of the United States
- 38°53′26″N 77°00′16″W
- Established: March 4, 1789; 236 years ago
- Location: Washington, D.C.
- Coordinates: 38°53′26″N 77°00′16″W
- Composition method: Presidential nomination with Senate confirmation
- Authorised by: Constitution of the United States, Art. III, § 1
- Judge term length: life tenure, subject to impeachment and removal
- Number of positions: 9 (by statute)
- Website: supremecourt.gov

This is a list of cases reported in volume 49 (8 How.) of United States Reports, decided by the Supreme Court of the United States in 1849 and 1850.

== Nominative reports ==
In 1874, the U.S. government created the United States Reports, and retroactively numbered older privately published case reports as part of the new series. As a result, cases appearing in volumes 1–90 of U.S. Reports have dual citation forms; one for the volume number of U.S. Reports, and one for the volume number of the reports named for the relevant reporter of decisions (these are called "nominative reports").

=== Benjamin Chew Howard ===
Starting with the 42nd volume of U.S. Reports, the Reporter of Decisions of the Supreme Court of the United States was Benjamin Chew Howard. Howard was Reporter of Decisions from 1843 to 1860, covering volumes 42 through 65 of United States Reports which correspond to volumes 1 through 24 of his Howard's Reports. As such, the dual form of citation to, for example, Reed v. Proprietors of Locks and Canals is 49 U.S. (8 How.) 274 (1850).

== Justices of the Supreme Court at the time of 49 U.S. (8 How.) ==
The Supreme Court is established by Article III, Section 1 of the Constitution of the United States, which says: "The judicial Power of the United States, shall be vested in one supreme Court . . .". The size of the Court is not specified; the Constitution leaves it to Congress to set the number of justices. Under the Judiciary Act of 1789 Congress originally fixed the number of justices at six (one chief justice and five associate justices). Since 1789 Congress has varied the size of the Court from six to seven, nine, ten, and back to nine justices (always including one chief justice).

When the cases in 49 U.S. (8 How.) were decided the Court comprised these nine members:

Portrait	Justice	Office	Home State	Succeeded	Date confirmed by the Senate (Vote)	Tenure on Supreme Court
	Roger B. Taney	Chief Justice	Maryland	John Marshall	March 15, 1836 (29–15)	March 28, 1836 – October 12, 1864 (Died)
	John McLean	Associate Justice	Ohio	Robert Trimble	March 7, 1829 (Acclamation)	January 11, 1830 – April 4, 1861 (Died)
	James Moore Wayne	Associate Justice	Georgia	William Johnson	January 9, 1835 (Acclamation)	January 14, 1835 – July 5, 1867 (Died)
	John Catron	Associate Justice	Tennessee	newly created seat	March 8, 1837 (28–15)	May 1, 1837 – May 30, 1865 (Died)
	John McKinley	Associate Justice	Alabama	newly created seat	September 25, 1837 (Acclamation)	January 9, 1838 – July 19, 1852 (Died)
	Peter Vivian Daniel	Associate Justice	Virginia	Philip P. Barbour	March 2, 1841 (25–5)	January 10, 1842 – May 31, 1860 (Died)
	Samuel Nelson	Associate Justice	New York	Smith Thompson	February 14, 1845 (Acclamation)	February 27, 1845 – November 28, 1872 (Retired)
	Levi Woodbury	Associate Justice	New Hampshire	Joseph Story	January 31, 1846 (Acclamation)	September 23, 1845 – September 4, 1851 (Died)
	Robert Cooper Grier	Associate Justice	Pennsylvania	Henry Baldwin	August 4, 1846 (Acclamation)	August 10, 1846 – January 31, 1870 (Retired)

== Notable case in 49 U.S. (8 How.) ==
=== Sheldon v. Sill ===
In Sheldon v. Sill, 49 U.S. (8 How.) 441 (1850), the Supreme Court held that the Congress may restrict the jurisdiction of the lower federal courts by limiting the subjects those courts may hear, even if those subjects fall within the federal judicial power defined by the United States Constitution.

== Citation style ==
Under the Judiciary Act of 1789 the federal court structure at the time comprised District Courts, which had general trial jurisdiction; Circuit Courts, which had mixed trial and appellate (from the US District Courts) jurisdiction; and the United States Supreme Court, which had appellate jurisdiction over the federal District and Circuit courts—and for certain issues over state courts. The Supreme Court also had limited original jurisdiction (i.e., in which cases could be filed directly with the Supreme Court without first having been heard by a lower federal or state court). There were one or more federal District Courts and/or Circuit Courts in each state, territory, or other geographical region.

Bluebook citation style is used for case names, citations, and jurisdictions.

- "C.C.D." = United States Circuit Court for the District of . . .
  - e.g.,"C.C.D.N.J." = United States Circuit Court for the District of New Jersey
- "D." = United States District Court for the District of . . .
  - e.g.,"D. Mass." = United States District Court for the District of Massachusetts
- "E." = Eastern; "M." = Middle; "N." = Northern; "S." = Southern; "W." = Western
  - e.g.,"C.C.S.D.N.Y." = United States Circuit Court for the Southern District of New York
  - e.g.,"M.D. Ala." = United States District Court for the Middle District of Alabama
- "Ct. Cl." = United States Court of Claims
- The abbreviation of a state's name alone indicates the highest appellate court in that state's judiciary at the time.
  - e.g.,"Pa." = Supreme Court of Pennsylvania
  - e.g.,"Me." = Supreme Judicial Court of Maine

== List of cases in 49 U.S. (8 How.) ==
Case Name	Page & year	Opinion of the Court	Concurring opinion(s)	Dissenting opinion(s)	Lower Court	Disposition
United States v. Carr	1 (1849)	Taney	none	none	Ct. App. Terr. Fla.	dismissed
Ladd v. Ladd	10 (1850)	Daniel	none	none	C.C.D.C.	affirmed
United States v. Staats	41 (1849)	Nelson	none	none	C.C.N.D.N.Y.	certification
Surgett v. Lapice	48 (1850)	Catron	none	none	C.C.D. La.	reversed
Nathan v. Louisiana	73 (1850)	McLean	none	none	La.	affirmed
United States v. Buchanan	83 (1850)	Woodbury	none	none	C.C.E.D. Pa.	reversed
Williams v. Benedict	107 (1850)	Grier	none	none	N.D. Miss.	reversed
United States v. Boisdore's Heirs	113 (1849)	Taney	none	none	S.D. Miss.	dismissal denied
Bennett v. Butterworth	124 (1850)	Taney	none	Daniel	D. Tex.	dismissal denied
Veazie v. Williams	134 (1850)	Woodbury	none	none	C.C.D. Me.	reversed
Phalen v. Virginia	163 (1850)	Grier	none	none	Va. Gen. Ct.	affirmed
McClanahan v. Davis	170 (1850)	Nelson	none	none	C.C.D.C.	affirmed
Taylor v. Taylor	183 (1850)	Daniel	Wayne	none	C.C.D. Ga.	reversed
Maxwell v. Kennedy	210 (1850)	Taney	none	none	C.C.S.D. Ala.	affirmed
Marsh v. Brooks	223 (1850)	Catron	none	none	Iowa	reversed
Wanzer v. Tupper	234 (1850)	Taney	none	none	C.C.S.D. Miss.	reversed
Clark v. Manufacturers' Ins. Co.	235 (1850)	Woodbury	none	none	C.C.D. Mass.	reversed
Lord v. Veazie	251 (1850)	Taney	none	none	C.C.D. Me.	dismissed
Peale v. Phipps	256 (1850)	McLean	none	none	not indicated	dismissal denied
Wilson v. Barnum	258 (1850)	Taney	none	none	C.C.E.D. Pa.	certification
Doe v. Watson	263 (1850)	McLean	none	none	C.C.E.D. Pa.	affirmed
Reed v. Proprietors of L. & C.	274 (1850)	Grier	none	none	C.C.D. Mass.	affirmed
Menard's Heirs v. Massey	293 (1850)	Catron	none	none	C.C.D. Mo.	affirmed
Bissell v. Penrose	317 (1850)	Nelson	none	McLean	C.C.D. Mo.	affirmed
Mills v. Stoddard	345 (1850)	McLean	none	none	C.C.D. Mo.	affirmed
Caldwell v. United States	366 (1850)	Wayne	none	none	C.C.E.D. Pa.	reversed
Gibson v. Stevens	384 (1850)	Taney	none	none	C.C.D. Ind.	reversed
West v. Smith	402 (1850)	Woodbury	none	none	C.C.D.C.	affirmed
Murrill v. Neill	414 (1850)	Daniel	none	none	C.C.D. Md.	affirmed
Grove v. Brien	429 (1850)	Nelson	none	none	C.C.D.C.	affirmed
Sheldon v. Sill	441 (1850)	Grier	none	none	C.C.D. Mich.	reversed
Le Roy v. Beard	451 (1850)	Woodbury	none	none	C.C.S.D.N.Y.	affirmed
Prentice v. Zane's Adm'r	470 (1850)	Grier	none	Wayne, Woodbury	W.D. Va.	affirmed
Mager v. Grima	490 (1850)	Taney	none	none	La.	affirmed
Williamson v. Berry	495 (1850)	Wayne	none	Nelson	C.C.S.D.N.Y.	certification
Williamson v. Irish P.C.	565 (1850)	Wayne	none	none	C.C.S.D.N.Y.	certification
Williamson v. Ball	566 (1850)	Wayne	none	none	C.C.S.D.N.Y.	certification
Mills v. St. Clair Cnty.	569 (1850)	Catron	none	none	Ill.	affirmed
Kennedy v. Bank of Ga.	586 (1850)	McLean	none	none	C.C.D. Ga.	affirmed

== See also ==
- Certificate of division
