= Sheldon v. Sill =

- Supreme Court of the United States

Decided February 21, 1850
- Full case name: Thomas C. Sheldon and Eleanor Sheldon, his wife, Appellants v. William E. Sill, Appellee
- Citations: 49 U.S. 441 (more) 8 How. 441; 12 L. Ed. 1147

Holding
- Consistent with Article III, Congress may limit the diversity jurisdiction of the lower federal courts to exclude assignee diversity

Court membership
- Chief Justice Roger B. Taney Associate Justices John McLean · James M. Wayne; John Catron · John McKinley; Peter V. Daniel · Samuel Nelson; Levi Woodbury · Robert C. Grier

Case opinion
- Majority: Grier, joined by unanimous

Sheldon v. Sill, 49 U.S. (8 How.) 441 (1850), is a ruling by the Supreme Court of the United States holding that Congress may restrict the jurisdiction of the lower federal courts by limiting the subjects those courts may hear, even if those subjects fall within the federal judicial power defined by the United States Constitution.

Article III of the Constitution vests "the Judicial Power of the United States...in one supreme Court, and in such inferior Courts as the Congress may from time to time ordain and establish," and extends the jurisdiction of said courts to:

all Cases, in Law and Equity, arising under this Constitution, the Laws of the United States, and Treaties made, or which shall be made, under their Authority; to all Cases affecting Ambassadors, other public Ministers and Consuls; to all Cases of admiralty and maritime Jurisdiction; to Controversies to which the United States shall be a Party; to Controversies between two or more States; between a State and Citizens of another State; between Citizens of different States; between Citizens of the same State claiming Lands under Grants of different States, and between a State, or the Citizens thereof, and foreign States, Citizens or Subjects.

Congress exercised its power to "ordain and establish" such inferior Courts, the circuit courts, in the Judiciary Act of 1789. However:

The eleventh section of the Judiciary Act, which defines the jurisdiction of the Circuit Courts, restrains them from taking 'cognizance of any suit to recover the contents of any promissory note or other chose in action, in favor of an assignee, unless a suit might have been prosecuted in such court to recover the contents, if no assignment had been made, except in cases of foreign bills of exchange' . . . It must be admitted, that if the Constitution had ordained and established the inferior courts, and distributed to them their respective powers, they could not be restricted or divested by Congress. But . . . it has made no such distribution . . . [Consequentially, ] Congress, having the power to establish the courts, must define their [the inferior courts'] respective jurisdictions.

In Sheldon, then, the Supreme Court ruled that:

Congress may withhold from any court of its creation jurisdiction of any of the enumerated controversies. Courts created by statute can have no jurisdiction but such as the statute confers. No one of them can assert a just claim to jurisdiction exclusively conferred on another, or withheld from all . . . The Constitution has defined the limits of the judicial power of the United States, but has not prescribed how much of it shall be exercised by the Circuit Court; consequently, the statute which does prescribe the limits of their jurisdiction, cannot be in conflict with the Constitution, unless it confers powers not enumerated therein.

== See also ==
- List of United States Supreme Court cases, volume 49
