= Supreme Court of the United States =

Highest court of jurisdiction in the U.S.

- Supreme Court Seal

- Judiciary flag
- Interactive map of Supreme Court of the United States
- 38°53′26″N 77°00′16″W
- Established: March 4, 1789; 237 years ago
- Location: United States Supreme Court Building, 1 First Street, Northeast D.C., U.S.
- Coordinates: 38°53′26″N 77°00′16″W
- Composition method: Presidential nomination with Senate confirmation
- Authorised by: U.S. Constitution
- Reporters: United States Reports; Lawyers' Edition; Supreme Court Reporter
- Judge term length: Life tenure
- Number of positions: 9, by statute
- Language: English
- Website: supremecourt.gov

Chief Justice of the United States
- Currently: John Roberts
- Since: September 29, 2005

The Supreme Court of the United States (SCOTUS) is the highest court in the federal judiciary of the United States. It has ultimate appellate jurisdiction over all U.S. federal court cases, and over state court cases that turn on questions of U.S. constitutional or federal law. It also has original jurisdiction over a narrow range of cases, specifically "all Cases affecting Ambassadors, other public Ministers and Consuls, and those in which a State shall be Party". In 1803, the court asserted the power of judicial review, the ability to invalidate a statute for violating a provision of the Constitution. It is also able to strike down presidential directives for violating either the Constitution or statutory law.

Under Article Three of the United States Constitution, the composition and procedures of the Supreme Court were originally established by the 1st Congress through the Judiciary Act of 1789. As currently constituted the court consists of nine justices—the chief justice of the United States and eight associate justices—who meet at the Supreme Court Building in Washington, D.C. Justices have lifetime tenure, meaning they remain on the court until they die, retire, resign, or are impeached and removed from office. When a vacancy occurs, the president, with the advice and consent of the Senate, appoints a new justice.

Each justice has a single vote in deciding the cases argued before the court. When in the majority, the chief justice decides who writes the opinion of the court; otherwise, the most senior justice in the majority assigns the task. A justice may write an opinion in concurrence with the court, or they may write a dissent, and these concurrences or dissents may also be joined by other justices. On average, the Supreme Court receives about 7,000 petitions for writs of certiorari each year, but only grants about 80.

== History ==
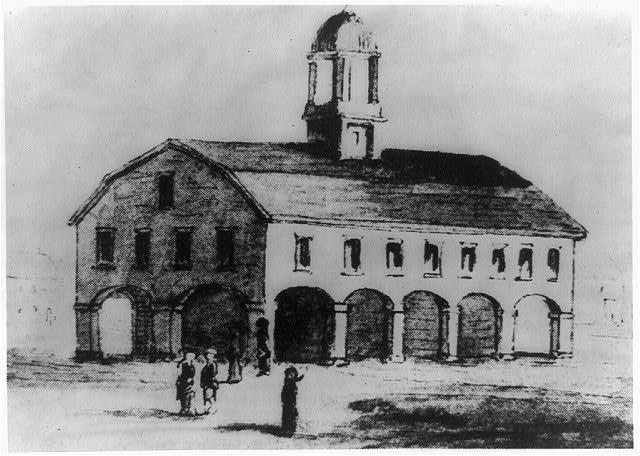
The Royal Exchange in New York City, the first meeting place of the Supreme Court

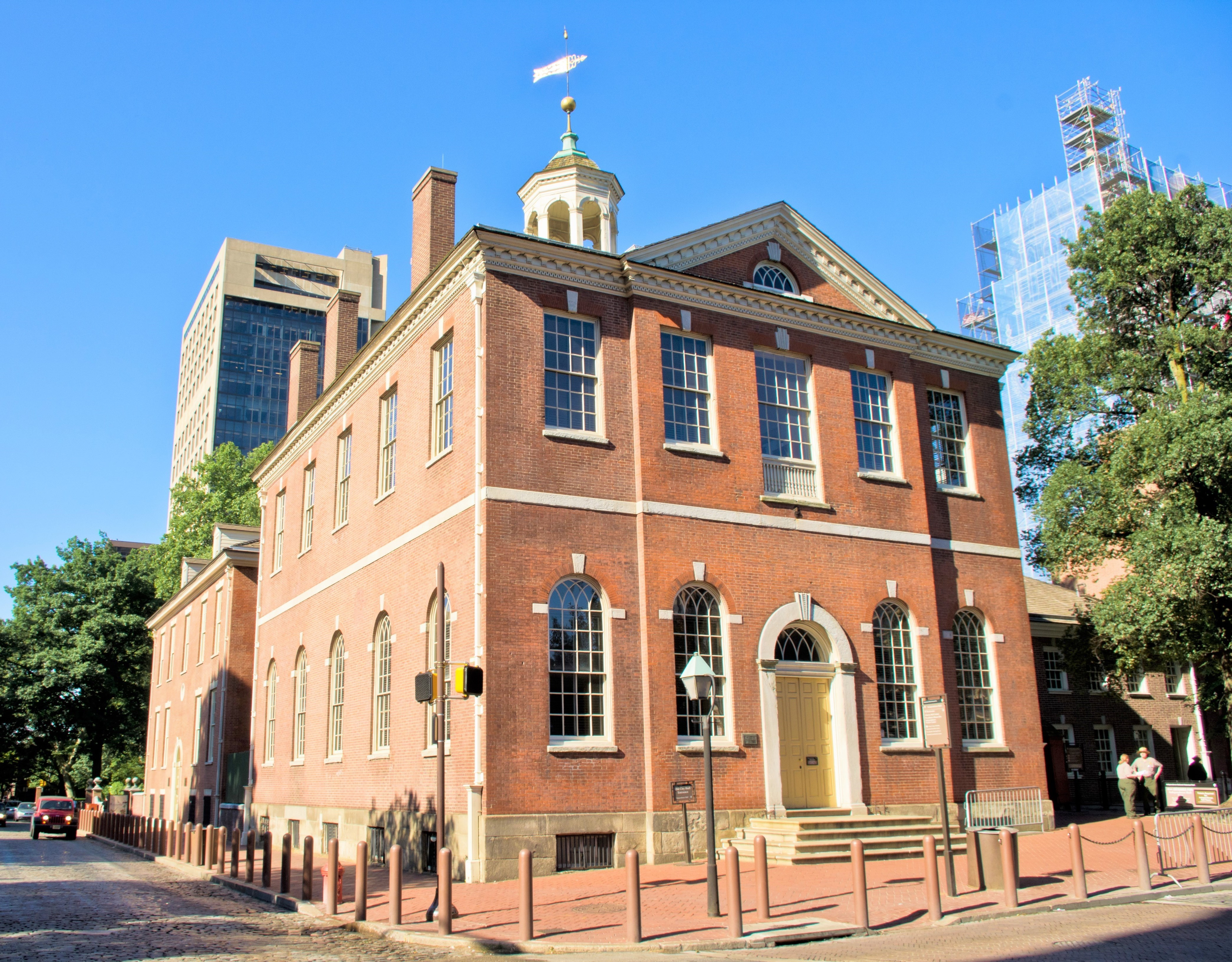
The court lacked its own building until 1935. For most of that time, it had chambers in the Capitol Building in Washington, D.C. Prior to that, between 1791 and 1801, the court met in City Hall (pictured) in Philadelphia.

In 1787, four years after the end of the American Revolutionary War, delegates to the 1787 Constitutional Convention convened in Philadelphia, where they debated the separation of powers between the legislative and executive departments and established parameters for a national judiciary as a third branch of the federal government. In the British tradition, judicial matters had been the responsibility of the royal (executive) authority. During the Constitutional Convention, delegates opposed to having a strong central government argued that national laws could be enforced by state courts. James Madison and others advocated for a national judicial authority chosen by the national legislature. It was proposed that the judiciary should have a role in checking executive branch power to veto or revise laws.

The framers ultimately compromised by sketching only a general outline of the judiciary in Article Three of the United States Constitution, vesting federal judicial power in "one supreme Court, and in such inferior Courts as the Congress may from time to time ordain and establish." They did not delineate the exact powers or prerogatives of the Supreme Court or determine how the judicial branch should be organized.

The 1st United States Congress provided the detailed organization of a federal judiciary through the Judiciary Act of 1789. They decided that the Supreme Court, as the country's highest judicial tribunal, would be based in the nation's capital and would be composed of a chief justice and five associate justices. The act also divided the country into judicial districts, which were in turn organized into circuits. Justices were required to hold circuit court twice a year in their assigned judicial district.

Immediately after signing the act into law, President George Washington nominated John Jay as the court's new chief justice, and John Rutledge, William Cushing, Robert H. Harrison, James Wilson and John Blair Jr. as its associate justices. All six were confirmed by the U.S. Senate on September 26, 1789. Harrison declined to serve, and Washington later nominated James Iredell to replace him.

The Supreme Court held its inaugural session from February 2 through February 10, 1790, at the Royal Exchange in New York City, then the U.S. capital. A second session was held there in August 1790. The earliest sessions of the court were devoted to organizational proceedings, as the first cases did not reach it until 1791. When the nation's capital was moved to Philadelphia in 1790, the Supreme Court moved to Philadelphia with it. After initially meeting in present-day Independence Hall, the court established its chambers at city hall. When the capital moved to Washington, D.C., the court was held in the U.S. Capitol Building (see, e.g. Old Supreme Court Chamber) until 1935 when it moved to its own building.

=== Early beginnings ===
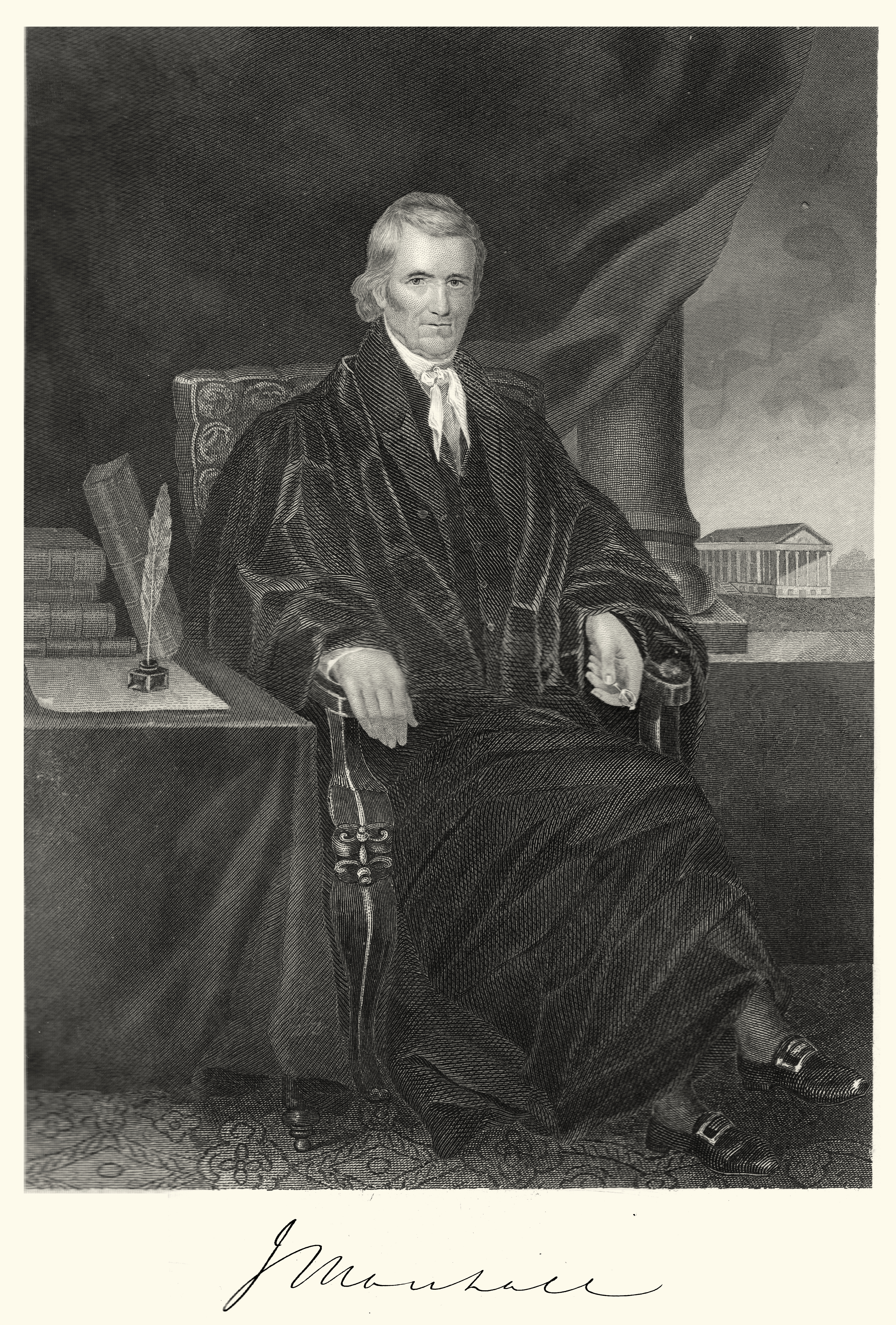
John Marshall, chief justice from 1801 to 1835

Under chief justices Jay, Rutledge, and Ellsworth (1789–1801), the court heard few cases; its first decision was West v. Barnes (1791), a case involving procedure. As the court initially had only six members, every decision that it made by a majority was also made by two-thirds (voting four to two). However, Congress has always allowed less than the court's full membership to make decisions, starting with a quorum of four justices in 1789. The court lacked a home of its own and had little prestige, a situation not helped by the era's highest-profile case, Chisholm v. Georgia (1793), which was reversed within two years by the adoption of the Eleventh Amendment.

The court's power and prestige grew substantially during the Marshall Court (1801–1835). Under Marshall, the court established the power of judicial review over acts of Congress, including specifying itself as the supreme expositor of the Constitution (Marbury v. Madison) and making several important constitutional rulings that gave shape and substance to the balance of power between the federal government and states, notably Martin v. Hunter's Lessee, McCulloch v. Maryland, and Gibbons v. Ogden.

The Marshall Court also ended the practice of each justice issuing his opinion seriatim, a remnant of British tradition, and instead issuing a single majority opinion. Also during Marshall's tenure, although beyond the court's control, the impeachment and acquittal of Justice Samuel Chase from 1804 to 1805 helped cement the principle of judicial independence.

=== From Taney to Taft ===
The Taney Court (1836–1864) made several important rulings, such as Sheldon v. Sill, which held that while Congress may not limit the subjects the Supreme Court may hear, it may limit the jurisdiction of the lower federal courts to prevent them from hearing cases dealing with certain subjects. Nevertheless, it is primarily remembered for its ruling in Dred Scott v. Sandford, which helped precipitate the American Civil War. In the Reconstruction era, the Chase, Waite, and Fuller Courts (1864–1910) interpreted the new Civil War amendments to the Constitution and developed the doctrine of substantive due process (Lochner v. New York; Adair v. United States). The size of the court was last changed in 1869, when it was set at nine.

Under the White and Taft Courts (1910–1930), the court held that the Fourteenth Amendment had incorporated some guarantees of the Bill of Rights against the states (Gitlow v. New York), grappled with the new antitrust statutes (Standard Oil Co. of New Jersey v. United States), upheld the constitutionality of military conscription (Selective Draft Law Cases), and brought the substantive due process doctrine to its first apogee (Adkins v. Children's Hospital).

=== New Deal era ===
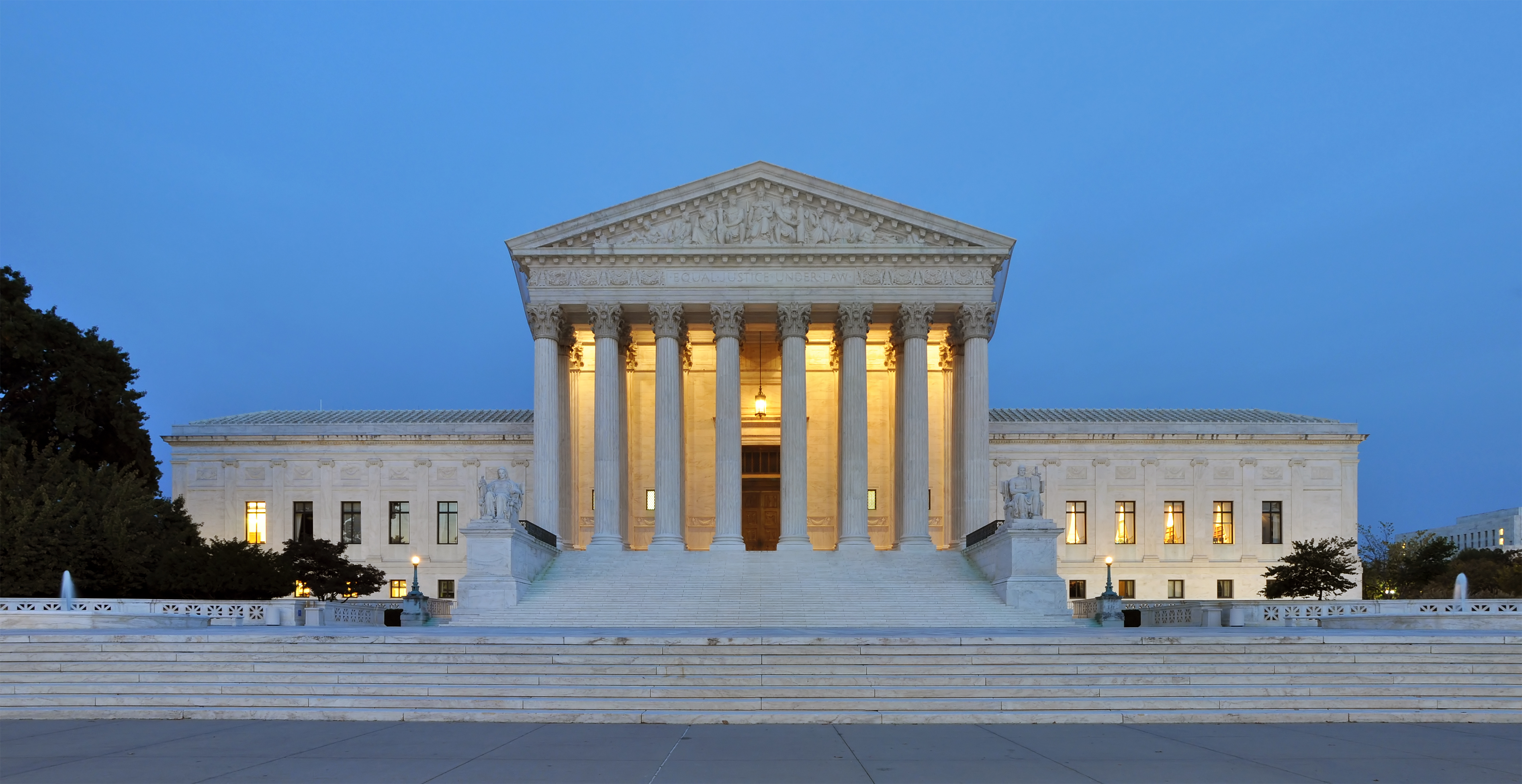
The U.S. Supreme Court Building in Washington, D.C., the home of the Supreme Court since 1935

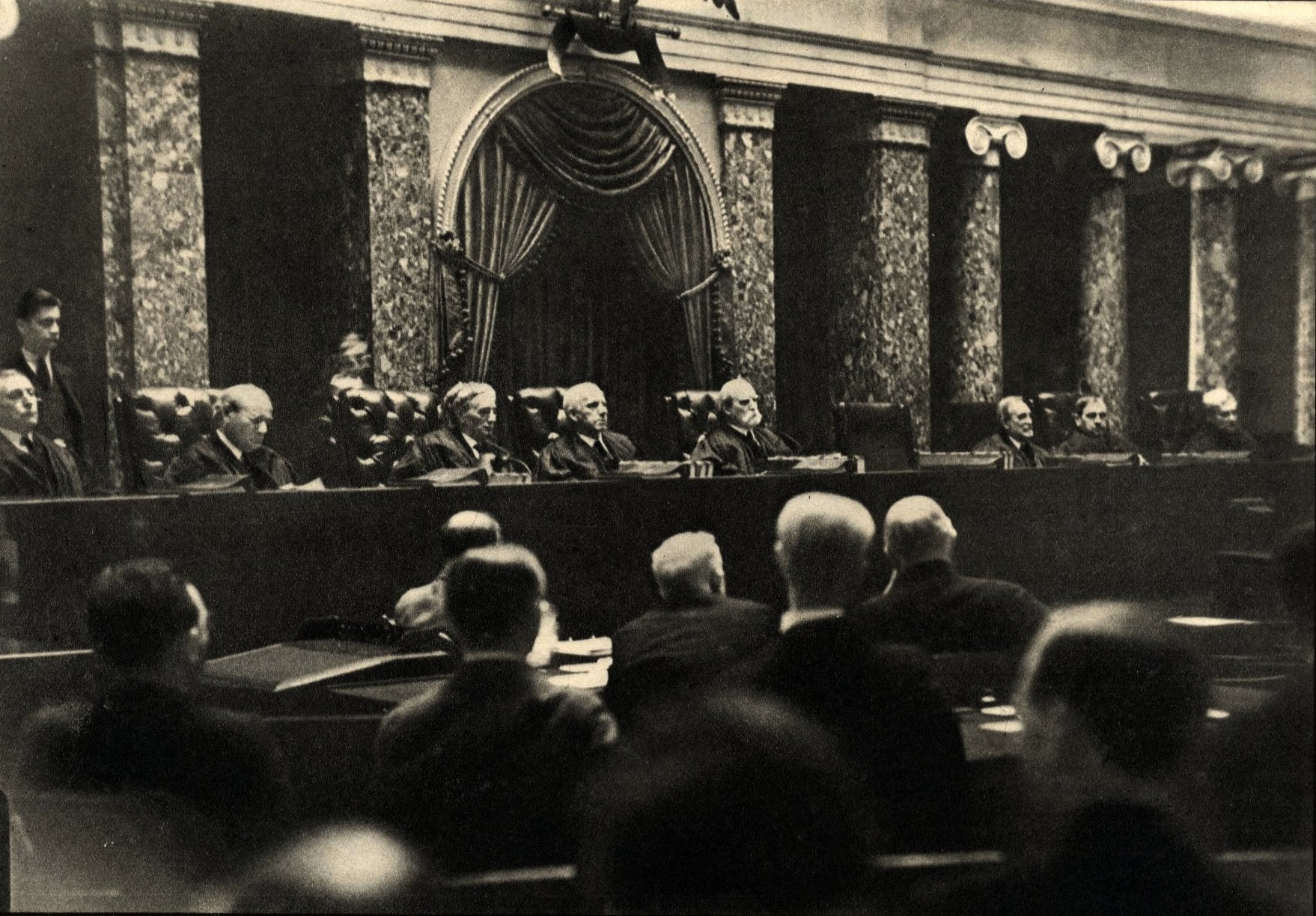
The Hughes Court in 1932, photographed by Erich Salomon. Members include Chief Justice Charles Evans Hughes (center), Louis Brandeis, Benjamin N. Cardozo, Harlan Stone, Owen Roberts, and the "Four Horsemen": Pierce Butler, James Clark McReynolds, George Sutherland, and Willis Van Devanter, who opposed New Deal policies.

During the Hughes, Stone, and Vinson courts (1930–1953), the court gained its own accommodation in 1935 and changed its interpretation of the Constitution, giving a broader reading to the powers of the federal government to facilitate President Franklin D. Roosevelt's New Deal (most prominently West Coast Hotel Co. v. Parrish, Wickard v. Filburn, United States v. Darby, and United States v. Butler). During World War II, the court continued to favor government power, upholding the internment of Japanese Americans (Korematsu v. United States) and the mandatory Pledge of Allegiance (Minersville School District v. Gobitis). Nevertheless, Gobitis was soon repudiated (West Virginia State Board of Education v. Barnette), and the Steel Seizure Case restricted the pro-government trend.

The Warren Court (1953–1969) dramatically expanded the force of Constitutional civil liberties. It held that segregation in public schools violates the Equal Protection Clause of the Fourteenth Amendment (Brown v. Board of Education, Bolling v. Sharpe, and Green v. County School Bd.) and that legislative districts must be roughly equal in population (Reynolds v. Sims). It recognized a general right to privacy (Griswold v. Connecticut), limited the role of religion in public school, most prominently Engel v. Vitale and Abington School District v. Schempp, incorporated most guarantees of the Bill of Rights against the states, prominently Mapp v. Ohio (the exclusionary rule) and Gideon v. Wainwright (right to appointed counsel), and required that criminal suspects be apprised of all these rights by police (Miranda v. Arizona). At the same time, the court limited defamation suits by public figures (New York Times Co. v. Sullivan) and supplied the government with an unbroken run of antitrust victories.

=== Burger, Rehnquist, and Roberts ===
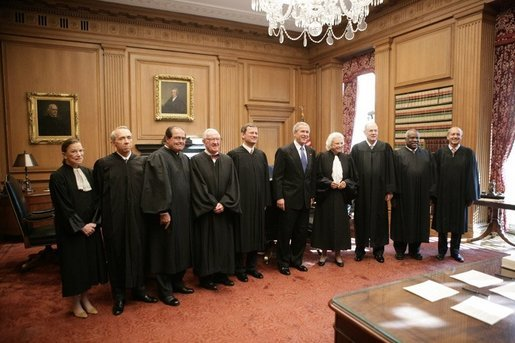
Supreme Court justices with President George W. Bush (center-right) in October 2005. Left to right are: Ruth Bader Ginsburg, David Souter, Antonin Scalia, John Paul Stevens, John Roberts, Sandra Day O'Connor, Anthony Kennedy, Clarence Thomas, and Stephen Breyer.

The Burger Court (1969–1986) saw a conservative shift. It also expanded Griswold's right to privacy to strike down abortion laws (Roe v. Wade) but divided deeply on affirmative action (Regents of the University of California v. Bakke) and campaign finance regulation (Buckley v. Valeo). It also wavered on the death penalty, ruling first that most applications were defective (Furman v. Georgia), but later that the death penalty itself was not unconstitutional (Gregg v. Georgia).

The Rehnquist Court (1986–2005) was known for its revival of judicial enforcement of federalism, emphasizing the limits of the Constitution's affirmative grants of power (United States v. Lopez) and the force of its restrictions on those powers (Seminole Tribe v. Florida, City of Boerne v. Flores). It struck down single-sex state schools as a violation of equal protection (United States v. Virginia), laws against sodomy as violations of substantive due process (Lawrence v. Texas) and the line-item veto (Clinton v. New York) but upheld school vouchers (Zelman v. Simmons-Harris) and reaffirmed Roe's restrictions on abortion laws (Planned Parenthood v. Casey). The court's decision in Bush v. Gore, which ended the electoral recount during the 2000 United States presidential election, remains especially controversial with debate ongoing over the rightful winner and whether or not the ruling should set a precedent.

The Roberts Court (2005–present) is regarded as more conservative and controversial than the Rehnquist Court. Some of its major rulings have concerned federal preemption (Wyeth v. Levine), civil procedure (Twombly–Iqbal), voting rights and federal preclearance (Shelby County), abortion (Gonzales v. Carhart and Dobbs v. Jackson Women's Health Organization), climate change (Massachusetts v. EPA), same-sex marriage (United States v. Windsor and Obergefell v. Hodges), and the Bill of Rights, such as in Citizens United v. Federal Election Commission (First Amendment), Heller–McDonald–Bruen (Second Amendment), and Baze v. Rees (Eighth Amendment).

== Composition ==
=== Nomination, confirmation, and appointment ===
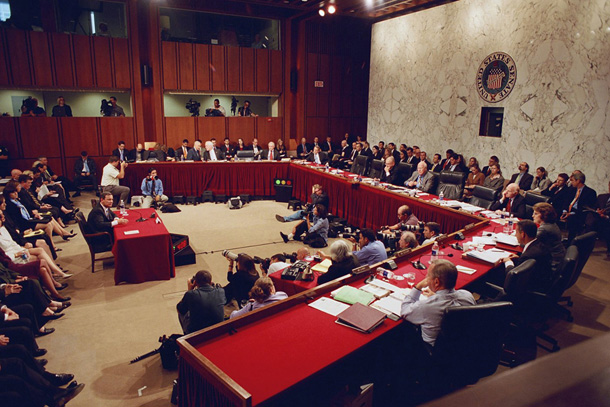
John Roberts giving testimony before the Senate Judiciary Committee during the 2005 hearings on his nomination to be chief justice

Article II, Section 2, Clause 2 of the United States Constitution, known as the Appointments Clause, empowers the president to nominate and, with the confirmation (advice and consent) of the United States Senate, to appoint public officials, including justices of the Supreme Court. This clause is one example of the system of checks and balances inherent in the Constitution. The president has the plenary power to nominate, while the Senate possesses the plenary power to reject or confirm the nominee. The Constitution sets no qualifications for service as a justice, such as age, citizenship, residence or prior judicial experience, thus a president may nominate anyone to serve, and the Senate may not set any qualifications or otherwise limit who the president can choose. Nonetheless, the Senate may deny confirmation to a candidate that it deems unqualified or unsuitable for the appointment.

In modern times, the confirmation process has attracted considerable attention from the press and advocacy groups, which lobby senators to confirm or to reject a nominee depending on whether their track record aligns with the group's views. The Senate Judiciary Committee conducts hearings and votes on whether the nomination should go to the full Senate with a positive, negative or neutral report. The committee's practice of personally interviewing nominees is relatively recent. The first nominee to appear before the committee was Harlan Fiske Stone in 1925, who sought to quell concerns about his links to Wall Street, and the modern practice of questioning began with John Marshall Harlan II in 1955. Once the committee reports out the nomination, the full Senate considers it. Rejections are relatively uncommon; the Senate has explicitly rejected twelve Supreme Court nominees, most recently Robert Bork, nominated by President Ronald Reagan in 1987.

Although Senate rules do not necessarily allow a negative or tied vote in committee to block a nomination, prior to 2017 a nomination could be blocked by filibuster once debate had begun in the full Senate. President Lyndon B. Johnson's nomination of sitting associate justice Abe Fortas to succeed Earl Warren as Chief Justice in 1968 was the first successful filibuster of a Supreme Court nominee. It included both Republican and Democratic senators concerned with Fortas's ethics. President Donald Trump's nomination of Neil Gorsuch to the seat left vacant by Antonin Scalia's death was the second. Unlike the Fortas filibuster, only Democratic senators voted against cloture on the Gorsuch nomination, citing his perceived conservative judicial philosophy, and the Republican majority's prior refusal to take up President Barack Obama's nomination of Merrick Garland to fill the vacancy. This led the Republican majority to change the rules and eliminate the filibuster for Supreme Court nominations.

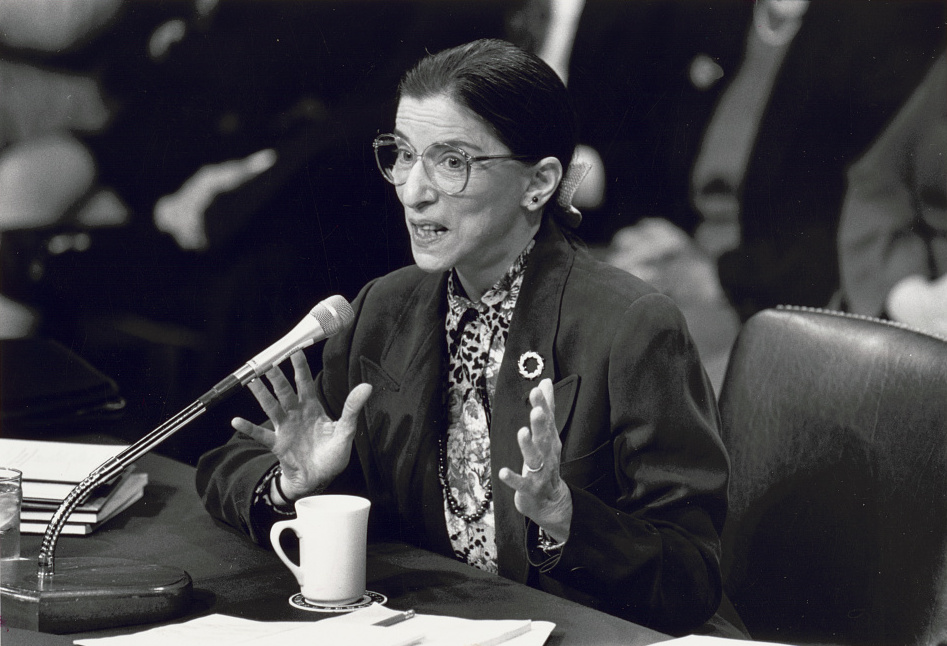
Ruth Bader Ginsburg giving testimony before the Senate Judiciary Committee during the 1993 hearings on her nomination to be an associate justice

Not every Supreme Court nominee has received a floor vote in the Senate. A president may withdraw a nomination before an actual confirmation vote occurs, typically because it is clear that the Senate will reject the nominee; this occurred with President George W. Bush's nomination of Harriet Miers in 2005. The Senate may also fail to act on a nomination, which expires at the end of the session. President Dwight Eisenhower's first nomination of John Marshall Harlan II in November 1954 was not acted on by the Senate; Eisenhower re-nominated Harlan in January 1955, and Harlan was confirmed two months later. Most recently, the Senate failed to act on the March 2016 nomination of Merrick Garland, as the nomination expired in January 2017, and the vacancy was filled by Neil Gorsuch, an appointee of President Trump.

Once the Senate confirms a nomination, the president must prepare and sign a commission, to which the Seal of the Department of Justice must be affixed, before the appointee can take office. The seniority of an associate justice is based on the commissioning date, not the confirmation or swearing-in date. After receiving their commission, the appointee must then take the two prescribed oaths before assuming their official duties. The importance of the oath taking is underscored by the case of Edwin M. Stanton. Although confirmed by the Senate on December 20, 1869, and duly commissioned as an associate justice by President Ulysses S. Grant, Stanton died on December 24, prior to taking the prescribed oaths. He is not, therefore, considered to have been a member of the court.

Before 1981, the approval process of justices was usually rapid. From the Truman through Nixon administrations, justices were typically approved within one month. From the Reagan administration to the present, the process has taken much longer and some believe this is because Congress sees justices as playing a more political role than in the past. According to the Congressional Research Service, the average number of days from nomination to final Senate vote since 1975 is 67 days (2.2 months), while the median is 71 days (2.3 months).

==== Recess appointments ====
When the Senate is in recess, a president may make temporary appointments to fill vacancies. Recess appointees hold office only until the end of the next Senate session (less than two years). The Senate must confirm the nominee for them to continue serving; of the two chief justices and eleven associate justices who have received recess appointments, only Chief Justice John Rutledge was not subsequently confirmed.

No U.S. president since Dwight D. Eisenhower has made a recess appointment to the court, and the practice has become rare and controversial even in lower federal courts. In 1960, after Eisenhower had made three such appointments, the Senate passed a "sense of the Senate" resolution that recess appointments to the court should only be made in "unusual circumstances"; such resolutions are not legally binding but are an expression of Congress's views in the hope of guiding executive action.

The Supreme Court's 2014 decision in National Labor Relations Board v. Noel Canning limited the ability of the president to make recess appointments (including appointments to the Supreme Court); the court ruled that the Senate decides when the Senate is in session or in recess. Writing for the court, Justice Breyer stated, "We hold that, for purposes of the Recess Appointments Clause, the Senate is in session when it says it is, provided that, under its own rules, it retains the capacity to transact Senate business." This ruling allows the Senate to prevent recess appointments through the use of pro-forma sessions.

=== Tenure ===
Lifetime tenure of justices can only be found for US federal judges and the State of Rhode Island's Supreme Court justices, with all other democratic nations and all other US states having set term limits or mandatory retirement ages. Larry Sabato wrote: "The insularity of lifetime tenure, combined with the appointments of relatively young attorneys who give long service on the bench, produces senior judges representing the views of past generations better than views of the current day." Sanford Levinson has been critical of justices who stayed in office despite medical deterioration based on longevity. James MacGregor Burns stated lifelong tenure has "produced a critical time lag, with the Supreme Court institutionally almost always behind the times". Proposals to solve these problems include term limits for justices, as proposed by Levinson and Sabato and a mandatory retirement age proposed by Richard Epstein, among others. Alexander Hamilton in Federalist 78 argued that one benefit of lifetime tenure was that, "nothing can contribute so much to its firmness and independence as permanency in office".

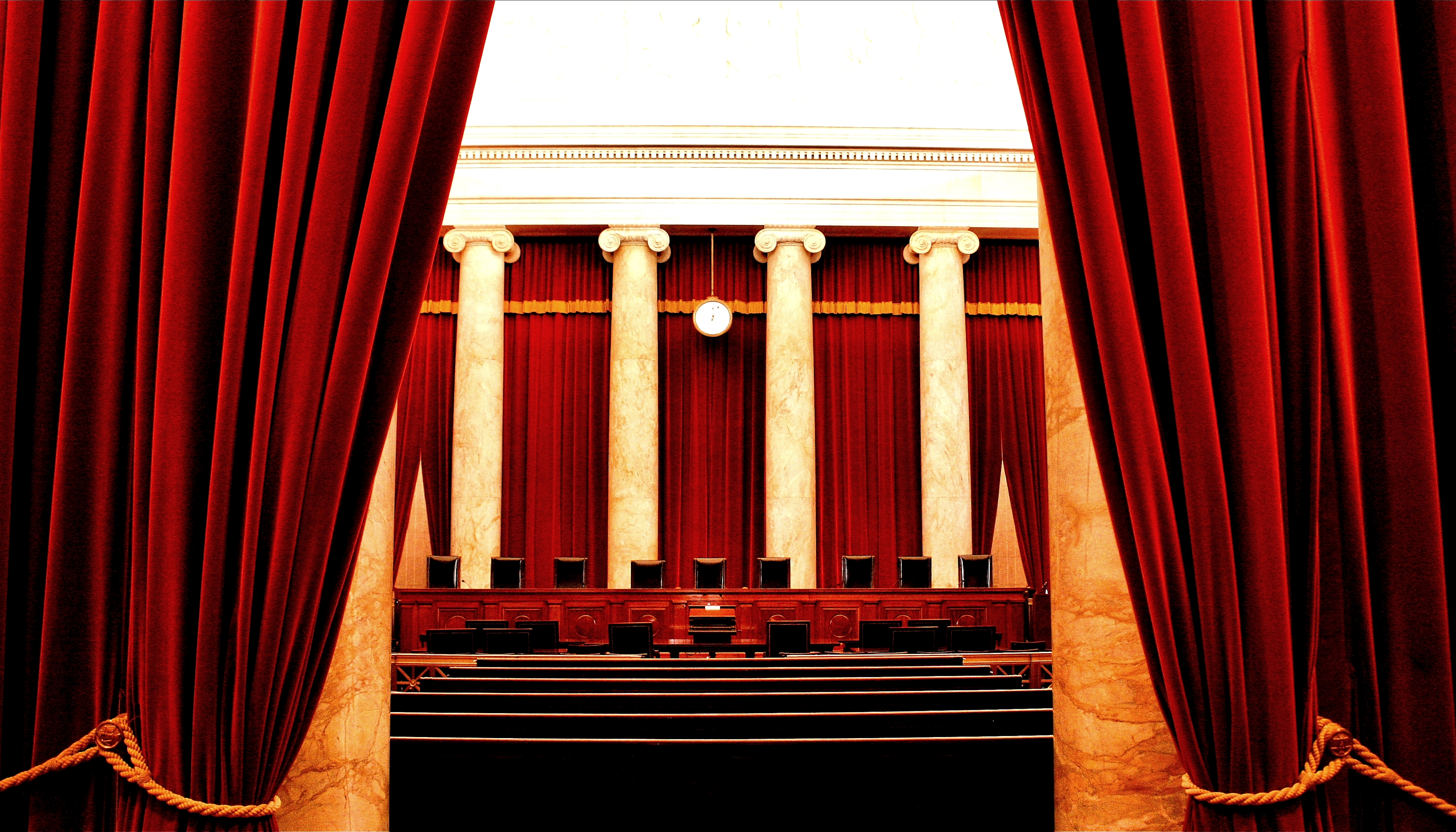
The interior of the United States Supreme Court

Article Three, Section 1 of the Constitution provides that justices "shall hold their offices during good behavior", which is understood to mean that they may serve for the remainder of their lives, until death; furthermore, the phrase is generally interpreted to mean that the only way justices can be removed from office is by Congress via the impeachment process. The Framers of the Constitution chose good behavior tenure to limit the power to remove justices and to ensure judicial independence. No constitutional mechanism exists for removing a justice who is permanently incapacitated by illness or injury, but unable (or unwilling) to resign. The only justice ever to be impeached was Samuel Chase, in 1804. The House of Representatives adopted eight articles of impeachment against him; however, he was acquitted by the Senate, and remained in office until his death in 1811. Two justices, William O. Douglas and Abe Fortas were subjected to hearings from the Judiciary Committee, with Douglas being the subject of hearings twice, in 1953 and again in 1970 and Fortas resigned while hearings were being organized in 1969. On July 10, 2024, Representative Alexandria Ocasio-Cortez filed Articles of Impeachment against justices Clarence Thomas and Samuel Alito, citing their "widely documented financial and personal entanglements".

Because justices have indefinite tenure, timing of vacancies can be unpredictable. Sometimes they arise in quick succession, as in September 1971, when Hugo Black and John Marshall Harlan II left within days of each other, the shortest period of time between vacancies in the court's history. Sometimes a great length of time passes between vacancies, such as the 11-year span, from 1994 to 2005, from the retirement of Harry Blackmun to the death of William Rehnquist, which was the second longest timespan between vacancies in the court's history. On average a new justice joins the court about every two years.

Despite the variability, all but four presidents have been able to appoint at least one justice. William Henry Harrison died a month after taking office, although his successor (John Tyler) made an appointment during that presidential term. Likewise, Zachary Taylor died 16 months after taking office, but his successor (Millard Fillmore) also made a Supreme Court nomination before the end of that term. Andrew Johnson, who became president after the assassination of Abraham Lincoln, was denied the opportunity to appoint a justice by a reduction in the size of the court. Jimmy Carter is the only person elected president to have left office after at least one full term without having the opportunity to appoint a justice. Presidents James Monroe, Franklin D. Roosevelt, and George W. Bush each served a full term without an opportunity to appoint a justice, but made appointments during their subsequent terms in office. No president who has served more than one full term has gone without at least one opportunity to make an appointment.

=== Size of the court ===
The U.S. Supreme Court consists of nine members: one chief justice and eight associate justices. The U.S. Constitution does not specify the size of the Supreme Court, nor does it specify any specific positions for the court's members. The Constitution assumes the existence of the office of the chief justice, because it mentions in Article I, Section 3, Clause 6 that "the Chief Justice" must preside over impeachment trials of the president of the United States. The power to define the Supreme Court's size and membership has been assumed to belong to Congress, which initially established a six-member Supreme Court composed of a chief justice and five associate justices through the Judiciary Act of 1789.

The size of the court was first altered by the Midnight Judges Act of 1801 which would have reduced the size of the court to five members upon its next vacancy (as federal judges have life tenure), but the Judiciary Act of 1802 promptly negated the 1801 act, restoring the court's size to six members before any such vacancy occurred. As the nation's boundaries grew across North America and as Supreme Court justices in those days had to ride the circuit, an arduous process requiring long travel on horseback or carriage over harsh terrain that resulted in months-long extended stays away from home, Congress added justices to correspond with the growth. Through this process, the number of seats for associate justices plus the chief justice became seven in 1807, nine in 1837, and ten in 1863.

At the behest of Chief Justice Chase, and in an attempt by the Republican Congress to limit the power of Democrat Andrew Johnson, Congress passed the Judicial Circuits Act of 1866, providing that the next three justices to retire would not be replaced, which would thin the bench to seven justices by attrition. Consequently, one seat was removed in 1866 and a second in 1867. Soon after Johnson left office, the new president Ulysses S. Grant, a Republican, signed into law the Judiciary Act of 1869. This changed the number of justices to nine (where it has since remained), which allowed Grant to fill an additional seat.

President Franklin D. Roosevelt attempted to expand the court in 1937. His proposal envisioned the appointment of one additional justice for each incumbent justice who reached the age of 70 years 6 months and refused retirement, up to a maximum bench of 15 justices. The proposal was ostensibly to ease the burden of the docket on elderly judges, but the actual purpose was widely understood as an effort to "pack" the court with justices who would support Roosevelt's New Deal. The plan, usually called the "court-packing plan", failed in Congress after members of Roosevelt's own Democratic Party believed it to be unconstitutional. It was defeated 70–20 in the Senate, and the Senate Judiciary Committee reported that it was "essential to the continuance of our constitutional democracy" that the proposal "be so emphatically rejected that its parallel will never again be presented to the free representatives of the free people of America."

The expansion of a 5–4 conservative majority to a 6–3 supermajority during the first presidency of Donald Trump led to analysts calling the court the most conservative since the 1930s as well as calls for an expansion in the court's size to fix what some saw as an imbalance, with Republicans having appointed 14 of the 18 justices immediately preceding Amy Coney Barrett. In April 2021, during the 117th Congress, some Democrats in the House of Representatives introduced the Judiciary Act of 2021, a bill to expand the Supreme Court from nine to 13 seats. It met divided views within the party, and Speaker of the House Nancy Pelosi did not bring it to the floor for a vote. Shortly after taking office in January 2021, President Joe Biden established a presidential commission to study possible reforms to the Supreme Court. The commission's December 2021 final report discussed, but took no position on, expanding the size of the court.

Lawyer and legal scholar Jonathan Turley has advocated for 19 justices, with the court being gradually expanded by two new members per presidential term, bringing the U.S. Supreme Court to a similar size as its counterparts in other developed countries. He says that a bigger court would reduce the power of the swing justice, ensure the court has "a greater diversity of views", and make confirmation of new justices less politically contentious.

== Membership ==
=== Sitting justices ===
There are nine justices on the Supreme Court: Chief Justice John Roberts and eight associate justices. Clarence Thomas is the longest-serving justice, with a tenure of 35 years, 21 days as of November 13, 2026. The most recent justice to join the court is Ketanji Brown Jackson, whose tenure began on June 30, 2022, after being confirmed by the Senate on April 7.

Current justices of the Supreme Court
Justice / birthdate and place	Appointed by (party)	U.S. Senate confirmation vote	Age at		Start date	Length of service	Succeeded
Justice / birthdate and place	Appointed by (party)	U.S. Senate confirmation vote	Start	Present	Start date	Length of service	Succeeded
(Chief Justice); John Roberts; January 27, 1955 (age 71); Buffalo, New York	G. W. Bush (R)	78–22	50	71	September 29, 2005	21 years, 45 days	Rehnquist (Reagan)
Clarence Thomas; June 23, 1948 (age 78); Pin Point, Georgia	G. H. W. Bush (R)	52–48	43	78	October 23, 1991	35 years, 21 days	Marshall (Johnson)
Samuel Alito; April 1, 1950 (age 76); Trenton, New Jersey	G. W. Bush (R)	58–42	55	76	January 31, 2006	20 years, 286 days	O'Connor (Reagan)
Sonia Sotomayor; June 25, 1954 (age 72); New York City, New York	Obama (D)	68–31	55	72	August 8, 2009	17 years, 97 days	Souter (G. H. W. Bush)
Elena Kagan; April 28, 1960 (age 66); New York City, New York	Obama (D)	63–37	50	66	August 7, 2010	16 years, 98 days	Stevens (Ford)
Neil Gorsuch; August 29, 1967 (age 59); Denver, Colorado	Trump (R)	54–45	49	59	April 10, 2017	9 years, 217 days	Scalia (Reagan)
Brett Kavanaugh; February 12, 1965 (age 61); Washington, D.C.	Trump (R)	50–48	53	61	October 6, 2018	8 years, 38 days	Kennedy (Reagan)
Amy Coney Barrett; January 28, 1972 (age 54); New Orleans, Louisiana	Trump (R)	52–48	48	54	October 27, 2020	6 years, 17 days	Ginsburg (Clinton)
Ketanji Brown Jackson; September 14, 1970 (age 56); Washington, D.C.	Biden (D)	53–47	51	56	June 30, 2022	4 years, 136 days	Breyer (Clinton)

This graphical timeline depicts the length of each current Supreme Court justice's tenure (not seniority, as the chief justice has seniority over all associate justices regardless of tenure) on the court:

=== Court demographics ===
The court has five male and four female justices. Among the nine justices, there are two African American justices (Justices Thomas and Jackson) and one Hispanic justice (Justice Sotomayor). One of the justices was born to at least one immigrant parent: Justice Alito's father was born in Italy.

At least six justices are Roman Catholics, one is Jewish, and one is Protestant. It is unclear whether Neil Gorsuch considers himself a Catholic or an Episcopalian. Historically, most justices have been Protestants, including 36 Episcopalians, 19 Presbyterians, 10 Unitarians, 5 Methodists, and 3 Baptists. The first Catholic justice was Roger Taney in 1836, and 1916 saw the appointment of the first Jewish justice, Louis Brandeis. In recent years the historical situation has reversed, as most recent justices have been either Catholic or Jewish.

Three justices are from the state of New York, two are from Washington, D.C., and one each is from New Jersey, Georgia, Colorado, and Louisiana. Eight of the justices received their Juris Doctor from an Ivy League law school: Neil Gorsuch, Ketanji Brown Jackson, Elena Kagan and John Roberts from Harvard; plus Samuel Alito, Brett Kavanaugh, Sonia Sotomayor and Clarence Thomas from Yale. Only Amy Coney Barrett did not; she received her Juris Doctor at Notre Dame.

Previous positions or offices, judicial or federal government, prior to joining the court (by order of seniority following the chief justice) include:

Justice	Position or office
John Roberts	Judge of the United States Court of Appeals for the District of Columbia Circuit (2003–2005); Principal Deputy Solicitor General of the United States (1989–1993); Associate Counsel to the President (1982–1986)
Clarence Thomas	Judge of the United States Court of Appeals for the District of Columbia Circuit (1990–1991); Chair of the Equal Employment Opportunity Commission (1982–1990); Assistant Secretary of Education for the Office for Civil Rights (1981–1982)
Samuel Alito	Judge of the United States Court of Appeals for the Third Circuit (1990–2006); United States Attorney for the District of New Jersey (1987–1990); Deputy Assistant Attorney General for the Office of Legal Counsel (1985–1987)
Sonia Sotomayor	Judge of the United States Court of Appeals for the Second Circuit (1998–2009); Judge of the United States District Court for the Southern District of New York (1992–1998)
Elena Kagan	Solicitor General of the United States (2009–2010); Deputy Director of the Domestic Policy Council (1997–2000)
Neil Gorsuch	Judge of the United States Court of Appeals for the Tenth Circuit (2006–2017); Principal Deputy Associate Attorney General (2005–2006)
Brett Kavanaugh	Judge of the United States Court of Appeals for the District of Columbia Circuit (2006–2018); White House Staff Secretary (2003–2006)
Amy Coney Barrett	Judge of the United States Court of Appeals for the Seventh Circuit (2017–2020)
Ketanji Brown Jackson	Judge of the United States Court of Appeals for the District of Columbia Circuit (2021–2022); Judge of the United States District Court for the District of Columbia (2013–2021); Vice Chair of the United States Sentencing Commission (2010–2014)

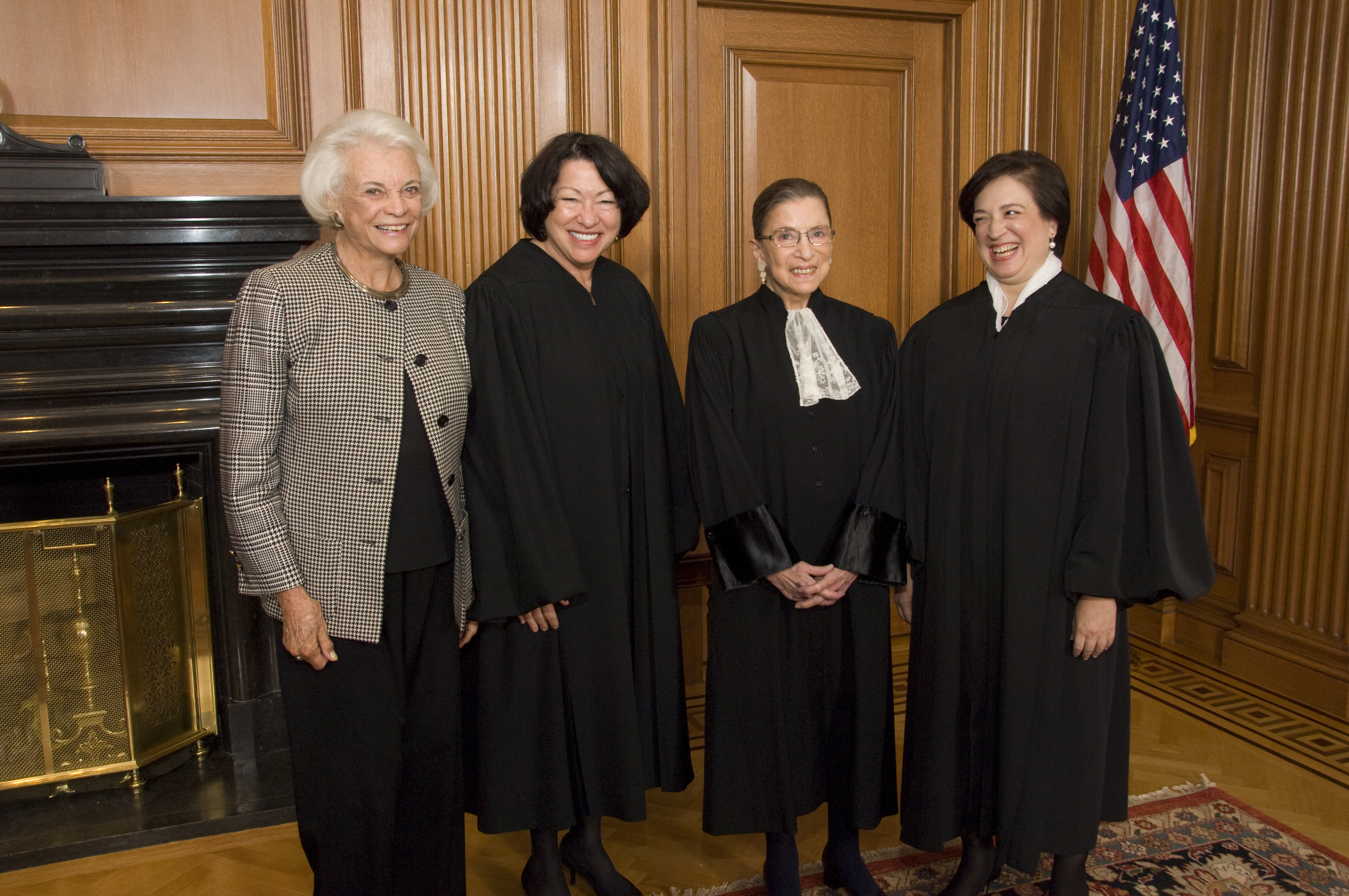
The first four female justices: O'Connor, Sotomayor, Ginsburg, and Kagan

For much of the court's history, every justice was a man of Northwestern European descent, and almost always Protestant. Diversity concerns focused on geography, to represent all regions of the country, rather than religious, ethnic, or gender diversity. Racial, ethnic, and gender diversity in the court increased in the late 20th century. Thurgood Marshall became the first African-American justice in 1967. Sandra Day O'Connor became the first female justice in 1981. In 1986, Antonin Scalia became the first Italian-American justice. Marshall was succeeded by African-American Clarence Thomas in 1991. O'Connor was joined by Ruth Bader Ginsburg, the first Jewish woman on the Court, in 1993. After O'Connor's retirement, Ginsburg was joined in 2009 by Sonia Sotomayor, the first Hispanic and Latina justice, and in 2010 by Elena Kagan. After Ginsburg's death on September 18, 2020, Amy Coney Barrett was confirmed as the fifth woman in the court's history on October 26, 2020. Ketanji Brown Jackson is the sixth woman and first African-American woman on the court.

There have been six foreign-born justices in the court's history: James Wilson (1789–1798), born in Caskardy, Scotland; James Iredell (1790–1799), born in Lewes, England; William Paterson (1793–1806), born in County Antrim, Ireland; David Brewer (1889–1910), born to American missionaries in Smyrna, Ottoman Empire (now İzmir, Turkey); George Sutherland (1922–1939), born in Buckinghamshire, England; and Felix Frankfurter (1939–1962), born in Vienna, Austria-Hungary (later Austria).

Since 1789, about one-third of the justices have been U.S. military veterans. Samuel Alito is the only veteran serving on the court. Retired justices Stephen Breyer and Anthony Kennedy also served in the U.S. military.

=== Judicial leanings ===
Justices are nominated by the president in power, and receive confirmation by the Senate, historically holding many of the views of the nominating president's political party. While justices do not represent or receive official endorsements from political parties, as is accepted practice in the legislative and executive branches, advocacy groups have played a role in the selection, nomination, and confirmation process. The justices are often informally categorized in the media as being conservatives or liberal. Attempts to quantify the ideologies of jurists include the Segal–Cover score, Martin–Quinn score, and Judicial Common Space score.

Devins and Baum argue that before 2010, the Court never had clear ideological blocs that fell perfectly along party lines. In choosing their appointments, Presidents often focused more on friendship and political connections than on ideology. Republican presidents sometimes appointed liberals, and Democratic presidents sometimes appointed conservatives. As a result, "... between 1790 and early 2010 there were only two decisions that the Guide to the U.S. Supreme Court designated as important and that had at least two dissenting votes in which the justices divided along party lines, about one-half of one percent." Even in the turbulent 1960s and 1970s, Democratic and Republican elites tended to agree on some major issues, especially concerning civil rights and civil liberties—and so did the justices. But since 1991, they argue, ideology has been much more important in choosing justices—all Republican appointees have been committed conservatives, and all Democratic appointees have been liberals. As the more moderate Republican justices retired, the court has become more partisan. The Court became more sharply divided along partisan lines, with justices appointed by Republican presidents taking increasingly conservative positions and those appointed by Democrats taking increasingly liberal positions.

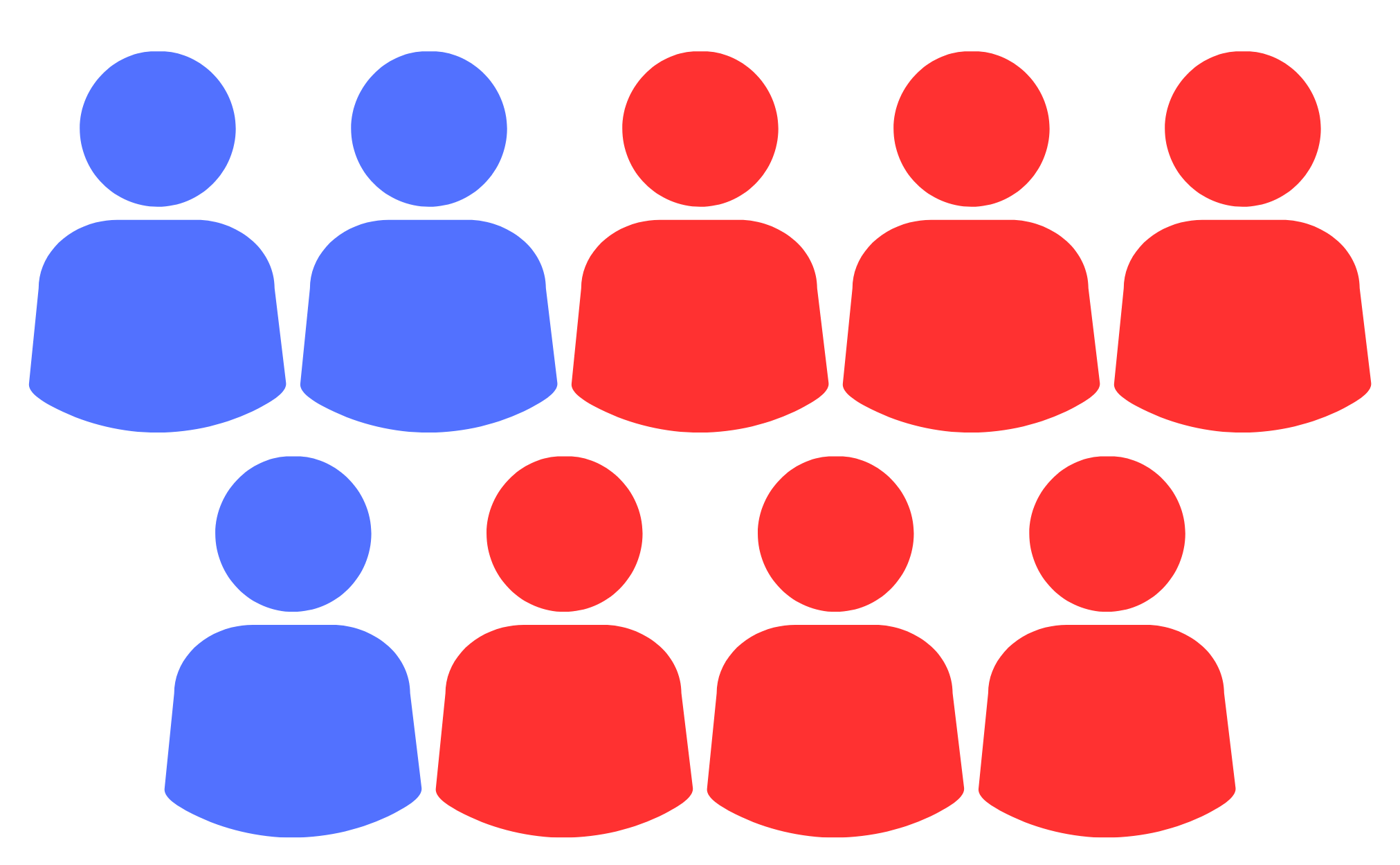
Balance of the US Supreme Court since 2020, shaded by party of the nominating president: Blue represents a Democratic president and red a Republican president

Following the confirmation of Amy Coney Barrett in 2020 after the death of Ruth Bader Ginsburg, the court is composed of six justices appointed by Republican presidents and three appointed by Democratic presidents. It is popularly accepted that Chief Justice Roberts and associate justices Thomas, Alito, Gorsuch, Kavanaugh, and Barrett, appointed by Republican presidents, compose the court's conservative wing, and that justices Sotomayor, Kagan, and Jackson, appointed by Democratic presidents, compose the court's liberal wing. Prior to Justice Ginsburg's death in 2020, the conservative chief justice Roberts was sometimes described as the court's 'median justice' (with four justices more liberal and four more conservative than he is). Darragh Roche argues that Kavanaugh as 2021's median justice exemplifies the rightward shift in the court. Noah Feldman describes the current ideological makeup of the court as a three-way split between the liberal faction, centrist-conservative faction, and arch-conservative faction, each with three members.

FiveThirtyEight found the number of unanimous decisions dropped from the 20-year average of nearly 50% to nearly 30% in 2021 while party-line rulings increased from a 60-year average just above zero to a record high 21%. That year Ryan Williams pointed to the party-line votes for confirmations of justices as evidence that the court is of partisan importance to the Senate. In 2022, Simon Lazarus of Brookings critiqued the U.S. Supreme Court as an increasingly partisan institution. A 2024 AP-NORC poll showed 7 in 10 respondents believed the court decides cases to "fit their own ideologies" as opposed to "acting as an independent check on other branches of government by being fair and impartial."

=== Retired justices ===
There are two living retired justices of the Supreme Court of the United States: Anthony Kennedy and Stephen Breyer. As retired justices, they no longer participate in the work of the Supreme Court, but may be designated for temporary assignments to sit on lower federal courts, usually the United States Courts of Appeals. Such assignments are formally made by the chief justice, on request of the chief judge of the lower court and with the consent of the retired justice. The status of a retired justice is analogous to that of a circuit or district court judge who has taken senior status, and eligibility of a Supreme Court justice to assume retired status (rather than simply resign from the bench) is governed by the same age and service criteria.

In recent times, justices tend to strategically plan their decisions to leave the bench with personal, institutional, ideological, partisan, and political factors playing a role. The fear of mental decline and death often motivates justices to step down. The desire to maximize the court's strength and legitimacy through one retirement at a time, when the court is in recess and during non-presidential election years suggests a concern for institutional health. Finally, especially in recent decades, many justices have timed their departure to coincide with a philosophically compatible president holding office, to ensure that a like-minded successor would be appointed.

Retired justices of the Supreme Court
Justice Birthdate and place	Appointed by	Age at		Tenure (active service)		
Justice Birthdate and place	Appointed by	Retirement	Present	Start date	End date	Length
Anthony Kennedy; July 23, 1936; Sacramento, California	Reagan (R)	82	90	February 18, 1988	July 31, 2018	30 years, 163 days
Stephen Breyer; August 15, 1938; San Francisco, California	Clinton (D)	83	88	August 3, 1994	June 30, 2022	27 years, 331 days

=== Salary ===
As of 2024, associate justices receive a yearly salary of $298,500 and the chief justice is paid $312,200 per year. Once a justice meets age and service requirements, the justice may retire with a pension based on the same formula used for federal employees. As with other federal courts judges, their pension can never be less than their salary at the time of retirement according to the Compensation Clause of Article III of the Constitution.

=== Seniority and seating ===
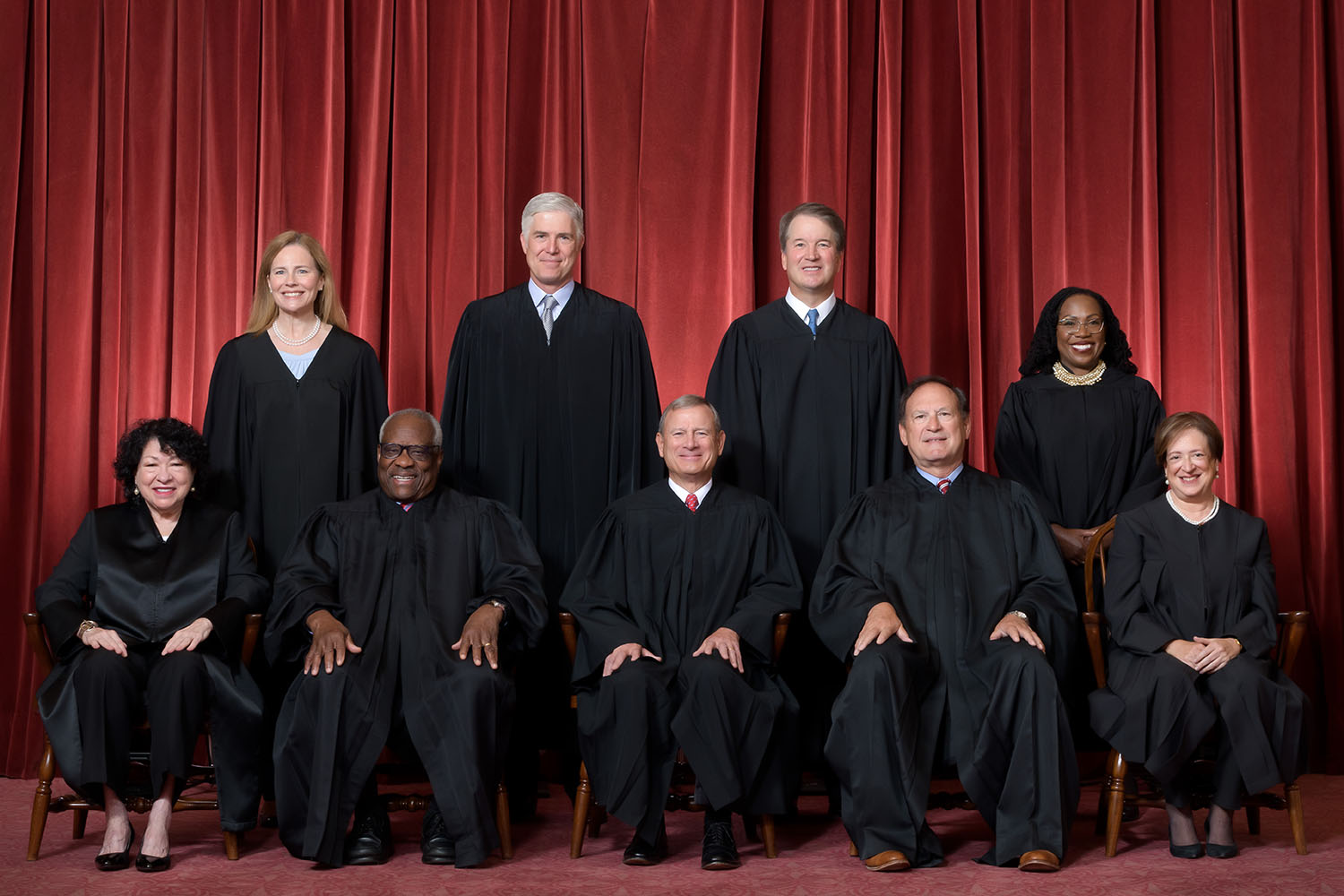
The Roberts Court (since June 2022): Front row (left to right): Sonia Sotomayor, Clarence Thomas, Chief Justice John Roberts, Samuel Alito, and Elena Kagan. Back row (left to right): Amy Coney Barrett, Neil Gorsuch, Brett Kavanaugh, and Ketanji Brown Jackson.

For the most part, the day-to-day activities of the justices are governed by rules of protocol based upon the seniority of justices. The chief justice always ranks first in the order of precedence—regardless of the length of their service. The associate justices are then ranked by the length of their service. The chief justice sits in the center on the bench, or at the head of the table during conferences. The other justices are seated in order of seniority. The senior-most associate justice sits immediately to the chief justice's right; the second most senior sits immediately to their left. The seats alternate right to left in order of seniority, with the most junior justice occupying the last seat. Therefore, since the October 2022 term, the court sits in order from left to right, from the perspective of those facing the court: Barrett, Gorsuch, Sotomayor, Thomas (most senior associate justice), Roberts (chief justice), Alito, Kagan, Kavanaugh, and Jackson. Likewise, when the members of the court gather for official group photographs, justices are arranged in order of seniority, with the five most senior members seated in the front row in the same order as they would sit during Court sessions (currently, from left to right, Sotomayor, Thomas, Roberts, Alito, and Kagan), and the four most junior justices standing behind them, again in the same order as they would sit during Court sessions (Barrett, Gorsuch, Kavanaugh, and Jackson).

In the justices' private conferences, the practice is for them to speak and vote in order of seniority, beginning with the chief justice and ending with the most junior associate justice. By custom, the most junior associate justice in these conferences is charged with any menial tasks the justices may require as they convene alone, such as answering the door of their conference room, serving beverages and transmitting orders of the court to the clerk.

== Facilities ==
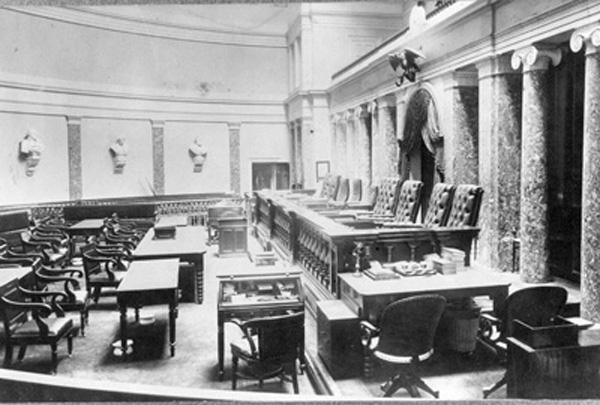
From the 1860s until the 1930s, the court sat in the Old Senate Chamber of the U.S. Capitol.

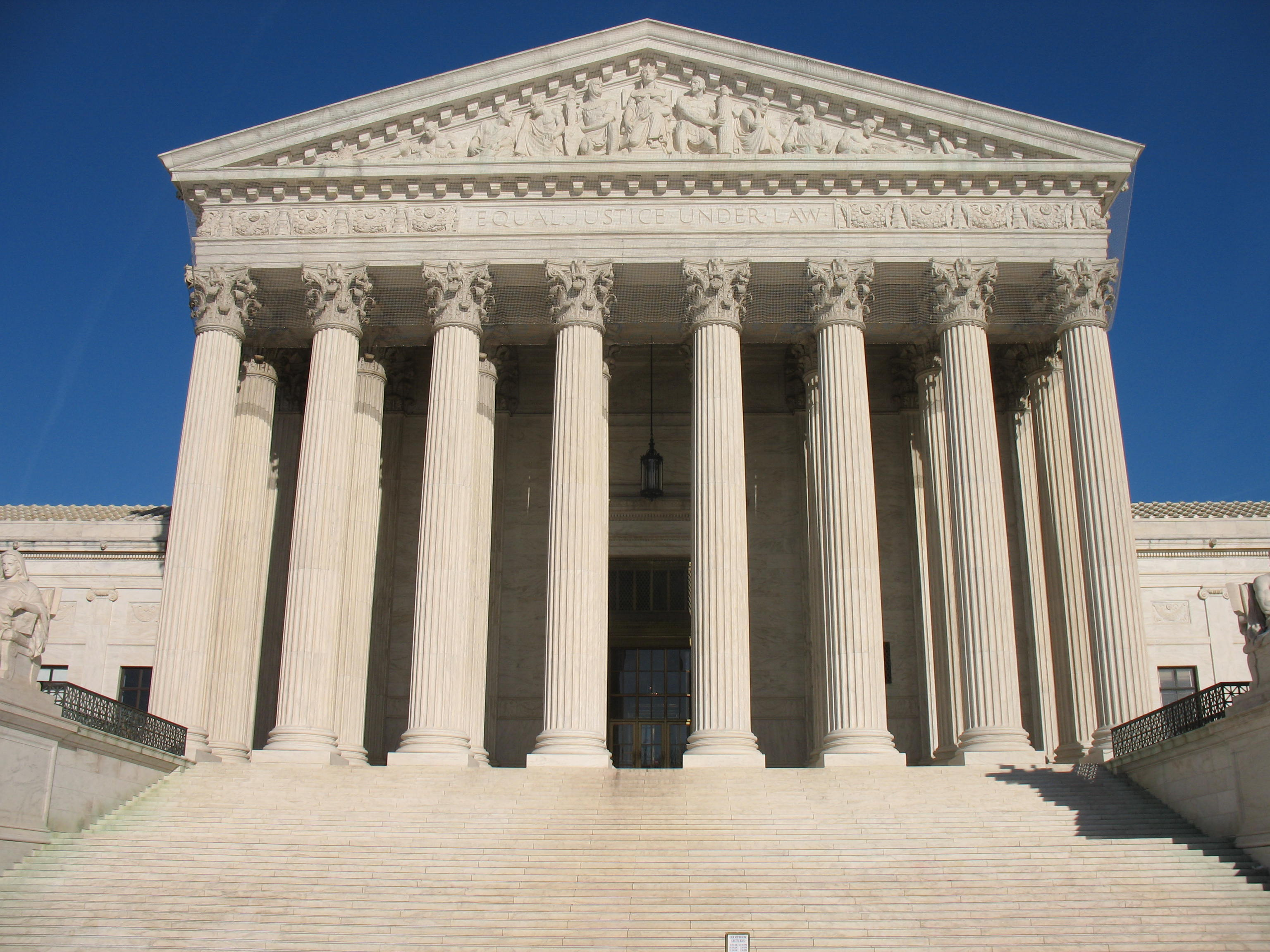
Current US Supreme Court building in 2007

The Supreme Court first met on February 1, 1790, at the Merchants' Exchange Building in New York City. When Philadelphia became the capital, the court met briefly in Independence Hall before settling in Old City Hall from 1791 until 1800. After the government moved to Washington, D.C., the court occupied various spaces in the Capitol building until 1935, when it moved into its own purpose-built home. The four-story building was designed by Cass Gilbert in a classical style sympathetic to the surrounding buildings of the Capitol and Library of Congress, and is clad in marble. The building includes the courtroom, justices' chambers, an extensive law library, various meeting spaces, and auxiliary services including a gymnasium. The Supreme Court building is within the ambit of the Architect of the Capitol, but maintains its own Supreme Court Police, separate from the Capitol Police.

Located across First Street from the United States Capitol at One First Street NE and Maryland Avenue, the building is open to the public. Visitors may not tour the actual courtroom unaccompanied. There is a cafeteria, a gift shop, exhibits, and a half-hour informational film. When the court is not in session, lectures about the courtroom are held hourly from 9:30 am to 3:30 pm and reservations are not necessary. When the court is in session the public may attend oral arguments, which are held twice each morning (and sometimes afternoons) on Mondays, Tuesdays, and Wednesdays in two-week intervals from October through late April, with breaks during December and February. Visitors are seated on a first-come first-served basis. One estimate is there are about 250 seats available. The number of open seats varies from case to case; for important cases, some visitors arrive the day before and wait through the night. The court releases opinions beginning at 10 am on scheduled "non-argument days" (also called opinion days) These sessions, which typically last 15 to 30-minute, are also open to the public. From mid-May until the end of June, at least one opinion day is scheduled each week. Supreme Court Police are available to answer questions.

== Jurisdiction ==
Congress is authorized by Article III of the federal Constitution to regulate the Supreme Court's appellate jurisdiction.

=== Original jurisdiction ===
The Supreme Court has original and exclusive jurisdiction over cases between two or more states but may decline to hear such cases. It also possesses original but not exclusive jurisdiction to hear "all actions or proceedings to which ambassadors, other public ministers, consuls, or vice consuls of foreign states are parties; all controversies between the United States and a State; and all actions or proceedings by a State against the citizens of another State or against aliens."

In 1906, the court asserted its original jurisdiction to prosecute individuals for contempt of court in United States v. Shipp. The resulting proceeding remains the only contempt proceeding and only criminal trial in the court's history. The contempt proceeding arose from the lynching of Ed Johnson in Chattanooga, Tennessee the evening after Justice John Marshall Harlan granted Johnson a stay of execution to allow his lawyers to file an appeal. Johnson was removed from his jail cell by a lynch mob, aided by the local sheriff who left the prison virtually unguarded, and hanged from a bridge, after which a deputy sheriff pinned a note on Johnson's body reading: "To Justice Harlan. Come get your nigger now." The local sheriff, John Shipp, cited the Supreme Court's intervention as the rationale for the lynching. The court appointed its deputy clerk as special master to preside over the trial in Chattanooga with closing arguments made in Washington before the Supreme Court justices, who found nine individuals guilty of contempt, sentencing three to 90 days in jail and the rest to 60 days in jail.

In all other cases, the court has only appellate jurisdiction, including the ability to issue writs of mandamus and writs of prohibition to lower courts. It considers cases based on its original jurisdiction very rarely; almost all cases are brought to the Supreme Court on appeal. In practice, the only original jurisdiction cases heard by the court are disputes between two or more states.

=== Appellate jurisdiction ===
The court's appellate jurisdiction consists of appeals from federal courts of appeal (through certiorari, certiorari before judgment, and certified questions), the United States Court of Appeals for the Armed Forces (through certiorari), the Supreme Court of Puerto Rico (through certiorari), the Supreme Court of the Virgin Islands (through certiorari), the District of Columbia Court of Appeals (through certiorari), and "final judgments or decrees rendered by the highest court of a State in which a decision could be had" (through certiorari). In the last case, an appeal may be made to the Supreme Court from a lower state court if the state's highest court declined to hear an appeal or lacks jurisdiction to hear an appeal. For example, a decision rendered by one of the Florida District Courts of Appeal can be appealed to the U.S. Supreme Court if (a) the Supreme Court of Florida declined to grant certiorari, e.g. Florida Star v. B. J. F., or (b) the district court of appeal issued a per curiam decision simply affirming the lower court's decision without discussing the merits of the case, since the Supreme Court of Florida lacks jurisdiction to hear appeals of such decisions. The power of the Supreme Court to consider appeals from state courts, rather than just federal courts, was created by the Judiciary Act of 1789 and upheld early in the court's history, by its rulings in Martin v. Hunter's Lessee (1816) and Cohens v. Virginia (1821). The Supreme Court is the only federal court that has jurisdiction over direct appeals from state court decisions, although there are several devices that permit so-called "collateral review" of state cases. This "collateral review" often only applies to individuals on death row and not through the regular judicial system.

Since Article Three of the United States Constitution stipulates that federal courts may only entertain "cases" or "controversies", the Supreme Court cannot decide cases that are moot and it does not render advisory opinions, as the supreme courts of some states may do. For example, in DeFunis v. Odegaard (1974), the court dismissed a lawsuit challenging the constitutionality of a law school affirmative action policy because the plaintiff student had graduated since he began the lawsuit, and a decision from the court on his claim would not be able to redress any injury he had suffered. However, the court recognizes some circumstances where it is appropriate to hear a case that is seemingly moot. If an issue is "capable of repetition yet evading review", the court would address it even though the party before the court would not themselves be made whole by a favorable result. In Roe v. Wade (1973), and other abortion cases, the court addresses the merits of claims pressed by pregnant women seeking abortions even if they are no longer pregnant because it takes longer than the typical human gestation period to appeal a case through the lower courts to the Supreme Court. Another mootness exception is voluntary cessation of unlawful conduct, in which the court considers the probability of recurrence and plaintiff's need for relief.

=== Justices as circuit justices ===
The United States is divided into thirteen circuit courts of appeals, each of which is assigned a "circuit justice" from the Supreme Court. Although this concept has been in continuous existence throughout the history of the republic, its meaning has changed through time. Under the Judiciary Act of 1789, each justice was required to "ride circuit", or to travel within the assigned circuit and consider cases alongside local judges. This practice encountered opposition from many justices, who cited the difficulty of travel. Moreover, there was a potential for a conflict of interest on the court if a justice had previously decided the same case while riding circuit. Circuit riding ended in 1891, when the Circuit Court of Appeals Act was passed, and circuit riding was officially abolished by Congress in 1911.

The circuit justice for each circuit is responsible for dealing with certain types of applications that, by law and the rules of the court, may be addressed by a single justice. Ordinarily, a justice will resolve such an application by simply endorsing it "granted" or "denied" or entering a standard form of order; however, the justice may elect to write an opinion, referred to as an in-chambers opinion. Congress has specifically authorized one justice to issue a stay pending certiorari in 28 U.S.C. § 2101(f). Each justice also decides routine procedural requests, such as for extensions of time.

Before 1990, the rules of the Supreme Court also stated that "a writ of injunction may be granted by any Justice in a case where it might be granted by the Court." However, this part of the rule (and all other specific mention of injunctions) was removed in the Supreme Court's rules revision of December 1989. Nevertheless, requests for injunctions under the All Writs Act are sometimes directed to the circuit justice. In the past, circuit justices also sometimes granted motions for bail in criminal cases, writs of habeas corpus, and applications for writs of error granting permission to appeal.

A circuit justice may sit as a judge on the Court of Appeals of that circuit, but over the past hundred years, this has rarely occurred. A circuit justice sitting with the Court of Appeals has seniority over the chief judge of the circuit. The chief justice has traditionally been assigned to the District of Columbia Circuit, the Fourth Circuit (which includes Maryland and Virginia, the states surrounding the District of Columbia), and, since it was established, the Federal Circuit. Each associate justice is assigned to one or two judicial circuits.

As of September 28, 2022, the allotment of the justices among the circuits is as follows:

Circuit	Justice
District of Columbia Circuit	Chief Justice Roberts
First Circuit	Justice Jackson
Second Circuit	Justice Sotomayor
Third Circuit	Justice Alito
Fourth Circuit	Chief Justice Roberts
Fifth Circuit	Justice Alito
Sixth Circuit	Justice Kavanaugh
Seventh Circuit	Justice Barrett
Eighth Circuit	Justice Kavanaugh
Ninth Circuit	Justice Kagan
Tenth Circuit	Justice Gorsuch
Eleventh Circuit	Justice Thomas
Federal Circuit	Chief Justice Roberts

Five of the current justices are assigned to circuits on which they previously sat as circuit judges: Chief Justice Roberts (D.C. Circuit), Justice Sotomayor (Second Circuit), Justice Alito (Third Circuit), Justice Barrett (Seventh Circuit), and Justice Gorsuch (Tenth Circuit). Justices Thomas, Kavanaugh, and Jackson all sat as circuit judges on the D.C. Circuit, which is assigned to Chief Justice Roberts. Justice Kagan is the only current member who did not serve as a judge prior to their appointment to the Court.

== Process ==
=== Case selection ===
Nearly all cases come before the court by way of petitions for writs of certiorari, commonly referred to as cert, upon which the court grants a writ of certiorari. The court may review via this process any civil or criminal case in the federal courts of appeals. It may also review by certiorari a final judgment of the highest court of a state if the judgment involves a question of federal statutory or constitutional law. A case may alternatively come before the court as a direct appeal from a three-judge federal district court. The party that petitions the court for review is the petitioner and the non-mover is the respondent.

Case names before the court are styled petitioner v. respondent, regardless of which party initiated the lawsuit in the trial court. For example, criminal prosecutions are brought in the name of the state and against an individual, as in State of Arizona v. Ernesto Miranda. If the defendant is convicted, and his conviction then is affirmed on appeal in the state supreme court, when he petitions for cert the name of the case becomes Miranda v. Arizona.

The court also hears questions submitted to it by appeals courts themselves via a process known as certification.

The Supreme Court relies on the record assembled by lower courts for the facts of a case and deals solely with the question of how the law applies to the facts presented. There are however situations where the court has original jurisdiction, such as when two states have a dispute against each other, or when there is a dispute between the United States and a state. In such instances, a case is filed with the Supreme Court directly. Examples of such cases include United States v. Texas, a case to determine whether a parcel of land belonged to the United States or to Texas, and Virginia v. Tennessee, a case turning on whether an incorrectly drawn boundary between two states can be changed by a state court, and whether the setting of the correct boundary requires Congressional approval. Although it has not happened since 1794 in the case of Georgia v. Brailsford, parties in an action at law in which the Supreme Court has original jurisdiction may request that a jury determine issues of fact. Georgia v. Brailsford remains the only case in which the court has empaneled a jury, in this case a special jury. Two other original jurisdiction cases involve colonial era borders and rights under navigable waters in New Jersey v. Delaware, and water rights between riparian states upstream of navigable waters in Kansas v. Colorado.

A cert petition is voted on at a session of the court called conference. A conference is a private meeting of the nine justices by themselves; the public and the justices' clerks are excluded. The rule of four permits four of the nine justices to grant a writ of certiorari. If it is granted, the case proceeds to the briefing stage; otherwise, the case ends. Except in death penalty cases and other cases in which the court orders briefing from the respondent, the respondent may, but is not required to, file a response to the cert petition. The court grants a petition for cert only for "compelling reasons", spelled out in the court's Rule 10. Such reasons include:

- Resolving a conflict between circuit courts in the interpretation of a federal law or a provision of the federal Constitution
- Correcting an egregious departure from the accepted and usual course of judicial proceedings
- Resolving an important question of federal law, or to expressly review a decision of a lower court that conflicts directly with a previous decision of the court.

When a conflict of interpretations arises from differing interpretations of the same law or constitutional provision issued by different federal circuit courts of appeals, lawyers call this situation a "circuit split"; if the court votes to deny a cert petition, as it does in the vast majority of such petitions that come before it, it does so typically without comment. A denial of a cert petition is not a judgment on the merits of a case, and the decision of the lower court stands as the case's final ruling. To manage the high volume of cert petitions received by the court each year (of the more than 7,000 petitions the court receives each year, it will usually request briefing and hear oral argument in 100 or fewer), the court employs an internal case management tool known as the "cert pool"; currently, all justices except for Justices Alito and Gorsuch participate in the cert pool.

=== Written evidence ===
The Court also relies on and cites amicus briefs, law review articles, and other written works for their decisions. While law review article use has increased slightly with one article cited per decision on average, the use of amicus briefs has increased significantly. The use of amicus briefs has received criticism, including the ability of authors to discuss topics outside their expertise (unlike in lower courts), with documented examples of falsehoods in written opinions, often supplied to the justices by amicus briefs from groups advocating a particular outcome. The lack of funding transparency and the lack of a requirement to submit them earlier in the process also make it more difficult to fact-check and understand the credibility of amicus briefs.

=== Oral argument ===
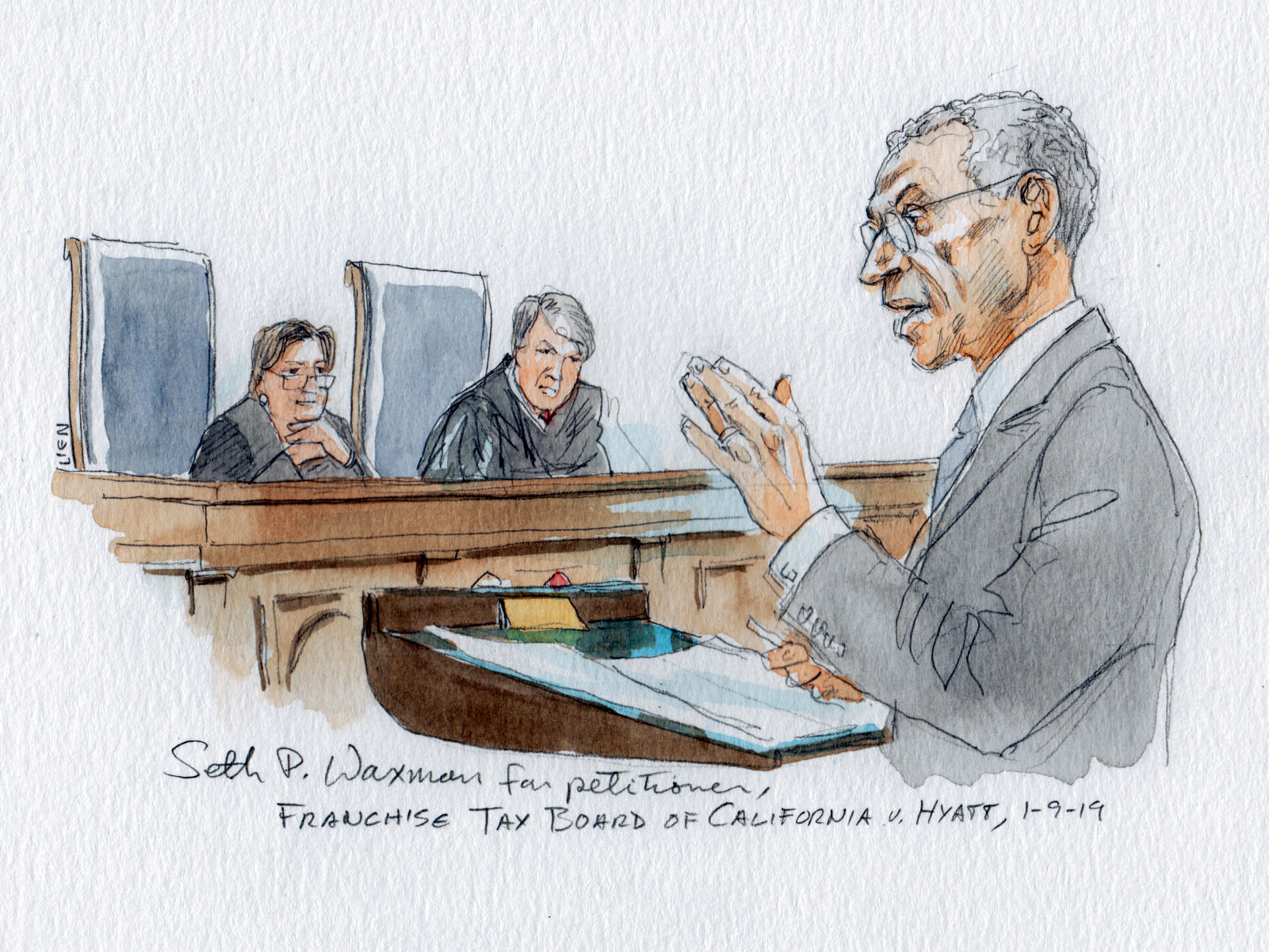
Seth P. Waxman at oral argument presents his case and answers questions from the justices.

When the court grants a cert petition, the case is set for oral argument. Both parties will file briefs on the merits of the case, as distinct from the reasons they may have argued for granting or denying the cert petition. With the consent of the parties or approval of the court, amici curiae, or "friends of the court", may also file briefs. The court holds two-week oral argument sessions each month from October through April. Each side has thirty minutes to present its argument (the court may choose to give more time, although this is rare), and during that time, the justices may interrupt the advocate and ask questions.

In 2019, the court adopted a rule generally allowing advocates to speak uninterrupted for the first two minutes of their argument. The petitioner gives the first presentation, and may reserve some time to rebut the respondent's arguments after the respondent has concluded. Amici curiae may also present oral argument on behalf of one party if that party agrees. The court advises counsel to assume that the justices are familiar with and have read the briefs filed in a case.

=== Decision ===
At the conclusion of oral argument, the case is submitted for decision. Cases are decided by majority vote of the justices. After the oral argument is concluded, usually in the same week as the case was submitted, the justices retire to another conference at which the preliminary votes are tallied and the court sees which side has prevailed. One of the justices in the majority is then assigned to write the court's opinion, also known as the "majority opinion", an assignment made by the most senior justice in the majority, with the chief justice always being considered the most senior. Drafts of the court's opinion circulate among the justices until the court is prepared to announce the judgment in a particular case.

Justices are free to change their votes on a case up until the decision is finalized and published. In any given case, a justice is free to choose whether or not to author an opinion or else simply join the majority or another justice's opinion. There are several primary types of opinions:

- Opinion of the court: this is the binding decision of the Supreme Court. An opinion that more than half of the justices join (usually at least five justices, since there are nine justices in total; but in cases where some justices do not participate it could be fewer) is known as "majority opinion" and creates binding precedent in American law. Whereas an opinion that fewer than half of the justices join is known as a "plurality opinion" and is only partially binding precedent.
- Concurring: a justice agrees with and joins the majority opinion but authors a separate concurrence to give additional explanations, rationales, or commentary. Concurrences do not create binding precedent.
- Concurring in the judgment: a justice agrees with the outcome the court reached but disagrees with its reasons for doing so. A justice in this situation does not join the majority opinion. Like regular concurrences, these do not create binding precedent.
- Dissent: a justice disagrees with the outcome the court reached and its reasoning. Justices who dissent from a decision may author their own dissenting opinions or, if there are multiple dissenting justices in a decision, may join another justice's dissent. Dissents do not create binding precedent. A justice may also join only part(s) of a particular decision, and may even agree with some parts of the outcome and disagree with others.

It is the court's practice to issue decisions in all cases argued in a particular term by the end of that term. Within that term, the court is under no obligation to release a decision within any set time after oral argument. Since recording devices are banned inside the courtroom of the Supreme Court Building, the delivery of the decision to the media has historically been done via paper copies in what was known as the "Running of the Interns". However, this practice has become passé as the Court now posts electronic copies of the opinions on its website as they are being announced.

It is possible that through recusals or vacancies the court divides evenly on a case. If that occurs, then the decision of the court below is affirmed, but does not establish binding precedent. In effect, it results in a return to the status quo ante. For a case to be heard, there must be a quorum of at least six justices. If a quorum is not available to hear a case and a majority of qualified justices believes that the case cannot be heard and determined in the next term, then the judgment of the court below is affirmed as if the court had been evenly divided. For cases brought to the Supreme Court by direct appeal from a United States District Court, the chief justice may order the case remanded to the appropriate U.S. Court of Appeals for a final decision there. This has only occurred once in U.S. history, in the case of United States v. Alcoa (1945).

=== Published opinions ===
The court's opinions are published in three stages. First, a slip opinion is made available on the court's web site and through other outlets. Next, several opinions and lists of the court's orders are bound together in paperback form, called a preliminary print of United States Reports, the official series of books in which the final version of the court's opinions appears.

About a year after the preliminary prints are issued, a final bound volume of U.S. Reports is issued by the Reporter of Decisions. The individual volumes of U.S. Reports are numbered so that users may cite this set of reports, or a competing version published by another commercial legal publisher but containing parallel citations, to allow those who read their pleadings and other briefs to find the cases quickly and easily.

As of January 2019, there are:

- Final bound volumes of U.S. Reports: 569 volumes, covering cases to June 13, 2013 (part of the October 2012 term).
- Slip opinions: 21 volumes (565–585 for 2011–2017 terms, three two-part volumes each), plus part 1 of volume 586 (2018 term).

As of March 2012, the U.S. Reports have published a total of 30,161 Supreme Court opinions, covering the decisions handed down from February 1790 to March 2012. This figure does not reflect the number of cases the court has taken up, as several cases can be addressed by a single opinion. See, for example, Parents v. Seattle, where Meredith v. Jefferson County Board of Education was also decided in the same opinion.

By a similar logic, Miranda v. Arizona decided Miranda and three other cases: Vignera v. New York, Westover v. United States, and California v. Stewart. A more unusual example is The Telephone Cases, which are a single set of interlinked opinions that take up the entire 126th volume of the U.S. Reports.

Opinions are also collected and published in two unofficial, parallel reporters: Supreme Court Reporter, published by West (now a part of Thomson Reuters), and United States Supreme Court Reports, Lawyers' Edition (simply known as Lawyers' Edition), published by LexisNexis. In court documents, legal periodicals and other legal media, case citations generally contain cites from each of the three reporters; for example, citation to Citizens United v. Federal Election Commission is presented as Citizens United v. Federal Election Com'n, 585 U.S. 50, 130 S. Ct. 876, 175 L. Ed. 2d 753 (2010), with "S. Ct." representing the Supreme Court Reporter, and "L. Ed." representing the Lawyers' Edition.

==== Citations to published opinions ====
Lawyers use an abbreviated format to cite cases, in the form "vol U.S. page, pin (year)", where vol is the volume number, page is the page number on which the opinion begins, and year is the year in which the case was decided. Optionally, pin is used to "pinpoint" to a specific page number within the opinion. For instance, the citation for Roe v. Wade is 410 U.S. 113 (1973), which means the case was decided in 1973 and appears on page 113 of volume 410 of U.S. Reports. For opinions or orders that have not yet been published in the preliminary print, the volume and page numbers may be replaced with ___

=== Supreme Court bar ===
In order to plead before the court, an attorney must first be admitted to the court's bar. Approximately 4,000 lawyers join the bar each year. The bar contains an estimated 230,000 members. In reality, pleading is limited to several hundred attorneys. The rest join for a one-time fee of $200, with the court collecting about $750,000 annually. Attorneys can be admitted as either individuals or as groups. The group admission is held before the current justices of the Supreme Court, wherein the chief justice approves a motion to admit the new attorneys. Lawyers commonly apply for the cosmetic value of a certificate to display in their office or on their resume. They also receive access to better seating if they wish to attend an oral argument. Members of the Supreme Court Bar are also granted access to the collections of the Supreme Court Library.

=== Term ===
A term of the Supreme Court commences on the first Monday of each October, and continues until June or early July of the following year. Each term consists of alternating periods of around two weeks known as "sittings" and "recesses"; justices hear cases and deliver rulings during sittings, and discuss cases and write opinions during recesses.

== Institutional powers ==
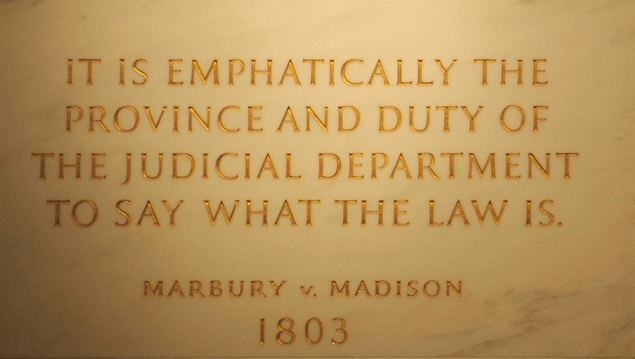
Inscription on the wall of the Supreme Court Building from Marbury v. Madison, in which Chief Justice John Marshall outlined the concept of judicial review

The federal court system and the judicial authority to interpret the Constitution received little attention in the debates over the drafting and ratification of the Constitution. The power of judicial review, in fact, is nowhere mentioned in it. Over the ensuing years, the question of whether the power of judicial review was even intended by the drafters of the Constitution was quickly frustrated by the lack of evidence bearing on the question either way.

Nevertheless, the power of judiciary to overturn laws and executive actions it determines are unlawful or unconstitutional is a well-established precedent. Many of the Founding Fathers accepted the notion of judicial review; in Federalist No. 78, Alexander Hamilton wrote: "A Constitution is, in fact, and must be regarded by the judges, as a fundamental law. It therefore belongs to them to ascertain its meaning, and the meaning of any particular act proceeding from the legislative body. If there should happen to be an irreconcilable variance between the two, that which has the superior obligation and validity ought, of course, to be preferred; or, in other words, the Constitution ought to be preferred to the statute."

The Supreme Court established its own power to declare laws unconstitutional in Marbury v. Madison (1803), consummating the American system of checks and balances. In explaining the power of judicial review, Chief Justice John Marshall stated that the authority to interpret the law was the particular province of the courts, part of the duty of the judicial department to say what the law is. His contention was not that the court had privileged insight into constitutional requirements, but that it was the constitutional duty of the judiciary, as well as the other branches of government, to read and obey the dictates of the Constitution. This decision was criticized by then-President Thomas Jefferson who said, "the Constitution, on this hypothesis, is a mere thing of wax in the hands of the judiciary, which they may twist and shape into any form they please."

Since the founding of the republic, there has been a tension between the practice of judicial review and the democratic ideals of egalitarianism, self-government, self-determination and freedom of conscience. At one pole are those who view the federal judiciary and especially the Supreme Court as being "the most separated and least checked of all branches of government." Federal judges and justices on the Supreme Court are not required to stand for election by virtue of their tenure "during good behavior", and their pay may "not be diminished" while they hold their position (Section 1 of Article Three). Although subject to the process of impeachment, only one justice has ever been impeached and no Supreme Court justice has been removed from office. At the other pole are those who view the judiciary as the least dangerous branch, with little ability to resist the exhortations of the other branches of government.

=== Constraints ===
The Supreme Court cannot directly enforce its rulings; instead, it relies on respect for the Constitution and for the law for adherence to its judgments. Popular history claims an instance of judicial nonacquiesence in 1832, when the state of Georgia ignored the Supreme Court's decision in Worcester v. Georgia. President Andrew Jackson, who sided with the Georgia courts, is supposed to have remarked, "John Marshall has made his decision; now let him enforce it!", but the tale is apocryphal.

Some state governments in the South also resisted the desegregation of public schools after the 1954 judgment Brown v. Board of Education. More recently, many feared that President Nixon would refuse to comply with the court's order in United States v. Nixon (1974) to surrender the Watergate tapes. Nixon ultimately complied with the Supreme Court's ruling.

Supreme Court decisions can be purposefully overturned by constitutional amendment, something that has happened on six occasions:

- Chisholm v. Georgia (1793) – overturned by the Eleventh Amendment (1795)
- Dred Scott v. Sandford (1857) – overturned by the Thirteenth Amendment (1865) and the Fourteenth Amendment (1868)
- Pollock v. Farmers' Loan & Trust Co. (1895) – overturned by the Sixteenth Amendment (1913)
- Minor v. Happersett (1875) – overturned by the Nineteenth Amendment (1920)
- Breedlove v. Suttles (1937) – overturned by the Twenty-fourth Amendment (1964)
- Oregon v. Mitchell (1970) – overturned by the Twenty-sixth Amendment (1971)

Recognizing the difficulty of constitutional amendment, and to avoid the antidemocratic problems inherent to the publication of decisions holding legislation or executive actions unconstitutional, the Court has resorted to self-imposed canons of construction and doctrinal rules, such as the doctrine of constitutional avoidance, to minimize occurrences where the political branches or popular movements should need to reverse the Court via constitutional amendment.

When the court rules on matters involving the interpretation of federal statutes rather than of the Constitution, simple legislative action can reverse the decisions (for example, in 2009 Congress passed the Lilly Ledbetter Fair Pay Act of 2009, superseding the limitations given in Ledbetter v. Goodyear Tire & Rubber Co. in 2007). Also, the Supreme Court is not immune from political and institutional consideration: lower federal courts and state courts sometimes resist doctrinal innovations, as do law enforcement officials.

In addition, the other two branches can restrain the court through other mechanisms. Congress can increase the number of justices, giving the president power to influence future decisions by appointments (as in Roosevelt's court-packing plan discussed above). Congress can pass legislation that restricts the jurisdiction of the Supreme Court and other federal courts over certain topics and cases: this is suggested by language in Section 2 of Article Three, where the appellate jurisdiction is granted "with such Exceptions, and under such Regulations as the Congress shall make." The court sanctioned such congressional action in the Reconstruction Era case Ex parte McCardle (1869), although it rejected Congress' power to dictate how particular cases must be decided in United States v. Klein (1871).

On the other hand, through its power of judicial review, the Supreme Court has defined the scope and nature of the powers and separation between the legislative and executive branches of the federal government; for example, in United States v. Curtiss-Wright Export Corp. (1936), Dames & Moore v. Regan (1981), and notably in Goldwater v. Carter (1979), which effectively gave the presidency the power to terminate ratified treaties without the consent of Congress. The court's decisions can also impose limitations on the scope of Executive authority, as in Humphrey's Executor v. United States (1935), the Steel Seizure Case (1952), and United States v. Nixon (1974).

== Law clerks ==
Each Supreme Court justice hires several law clerks to review petitions for writ of certiorari, research them, prepare bench memorandums, and draft opinions. Associate justices are allowed four clerks. The chief justice is allowed five clerks, but Chief Justice Rehnquist hired only three per year, and Chief Justice Roberts usually hires only four. Generally, law clerks serve a term of one to two years.

The first law clerk was hired by Associate Justice Horace Gray in 1882. Oliver Wendell Holmes Jr. and Louis Brandeis were the first Supreme Court justices to use recent law school graduates as clerks, rather than hiring "a stenographer-secretary". Most law clerks are recent law school graduates.

The first female clerk was Lucile Lomen, hired in 1944 by Justice William O. Douglas. The first African-American, William T. Coleman Jr., was hired in 1948 by Justice Felix Frankfurter. A disproportionately large number of law clerks have obtained law degrees from elite law schools, especially Harvard, Yale, the University of Chicago, Columbia, and Stanford. From 1882 to 1940, 62% of law clerks were graduates of Harvard Law School. Those chosen to be Supreme Court law clerks usually have graduated in the top of their law school class and were often an editor of the law review or a member of the moot court board. By the mid-1970s, clerking previously for a judge in a federal court of appeals had also become a prerequisite to clerking for a Supreme Court justice.

Ten Supreme Court justices previously clerked for other justices: Byron White for Frederick M. Vinson, John Paul Stevens for Wiley Rutledge, William Rehnquist for Robert H. Jackson, Stephen Breyer for Arthur Goldberg, John Roberts for William Rehnquist, Elena Kagan for Thurgood Marshall, Neil Gorsuch for both Byron White and Anthony Kennedy, Brett Kavanaugh also for Kennedy, Amy Coney Barrett for Antonin Scalia, and Ketanji Brown Jackson for Stephen Breyer. Justices Gorsuch and Kavanaugh served under Kennedy during the same term.

Gorsuch is the first justice to clerk for and subsequently serve alongside the same justice, serving alongside Kennedy from April 2017 through Kennedy's retirement in 2018. With the confirmation of Justice Kavanaugh, for the first time a majority of the Supreme Court was composed of former Supreme Court law clerks (Roberts, Breyer, Kagan, Gorsuch and Kavanaugh, now joined by Barrett and Jackson, who replaced Breyer).

Several current Supreme Court justices have also clerked in the federal courts of appeals: John Roberts for Judge Henry Friendly of the United States Court of Appeals for the Second Circuit, Justice Samuel Alito for Judge Leonard I. Garth of the United States Court of Appeals for the Third Circuit, Elena Kagan for Judge Abner J. Mikva of the United States Court of Appeals for the District of Columbia Circuit, Neil Gorsuch for Judge David B. Sentelle of the United States Court of Appeals for the District of Columbia, Brett Kavanaugh for Judge Walter Stapleton of the United States Court of Appeals for the Third Circuit and Judge Alex Kozinski of the United States Court of Appeals for the Ninth Circuit, and Amy Coney Barrett for Judge Laurence Silberman of the U.S. Court of Appeals for the D.C. Circuit.

=== Politicization of the court ===
Clerks hired by each of the justices of the Supreme Court are often given considerable leeway in the opinions they draft. "Supreme Court clerkship appeared to be a nonpartisan institution from the 1940s into the 1980s", according to a study published in 2009 by the law review of Vanderbilt University Law School. "As law has moved closer to mere politics, political affiliations have naturally and predictably become proxies for the different political agendas that have been pressed in and through the courts", former federal court of appeals judge J. Michael Luttig said.

David J. Garrow, professor of history at the University of Cambridge, stated that the court had thus begun to mirror the political branches of government. "We are getting a composition of the clerk workforce that is getting to be like the House of Representatives", Professor Garrow said. "Each side is putting forward only ideological purists." According to the Vanderbilt Law Review study, this politicized hiring trend reinforces the impression that the Supreme Court is "a superlegislature responding to ideological arguments rather than a legal institution responding to concerns grounded in the rule of law."

== Concerns and criticism ==
Unlike in most high courts, the United States Supreme Court has lifetime tenure, an unusual amount of power over elected branches of government, and a difficult constitution to amend. To these, among other factors, have been attributed by some critics the Court's diminished stature abroad and lower approval ratings at home, which have dropped from the mid-60s in the late 1980s to around 40% in the early 2020s. Additional factors cited by critics include the polarization of national politics, ethics scandals, and specific controversial partisan rulings, including the relaxation of campaign finance rules, increased gerrymandering, weakened voting laws, Dobbs v. Jackson and Bush v. Gore. The continued consolidation of power by the court and, as a result of its rulings, the Republican Party, has sparked debate over when democratic backsliding becomes entrenched single-party rule.

=== Approval ratings ===
Public trust in the court peaked in the late 1980s. Since the 2022 Dobbs ruling that overturned Roe v. Wade and devolved the regulation of abortion, Democrats and independents have increasingly lost trust in the court, seen the court as political, and expressed support for reforming the institution. Historically, the court had relatively more trust than other government institutions.

After recording recent high approval ratings in the late 1980s around 66% approval, the court's ratings have declined to an average of around 40% between mid-2021 and February 2024.

=== Composition and selection ===
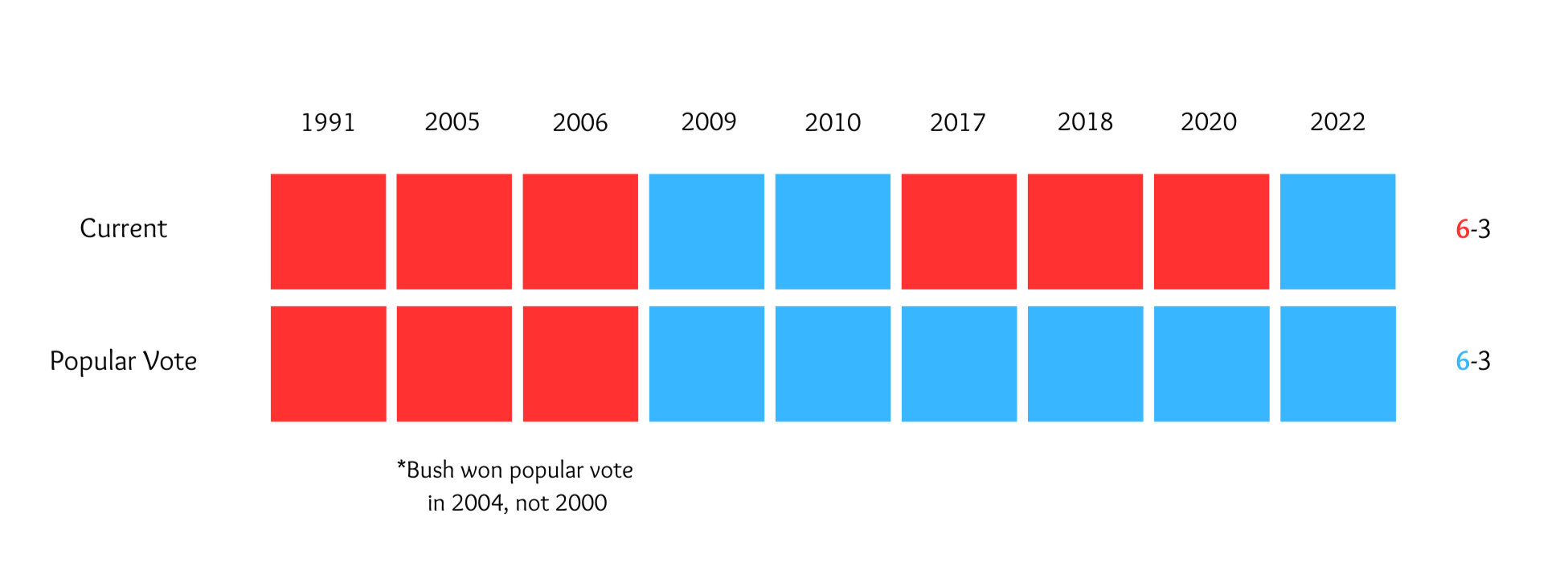
Composition of the Supreme Court may have flipped if popular vote winners had successful nominations to the court.

The electoral college (which elects the President who nominates the justices) and the U.S. Senate which confirms the justices, have selection biases that favor rural states that tend to vote Republican, resulting in a conservative Supreme Court. Ziblatt and Levitsky estimate that 3 or 4 of the seats held by conservative justices on the court would be held by justices appointed by a Democratic president if the Presidency and Senate were selected directly by the popular vote. The three Trump appointees to the court were all nominated by a president who finished second in the popular vote and confirmed by Senators representing a minority of Americans. In addition, Clarence Thomas' confirmation in 1991 and Merrick Garland's blocked confirmation in 2016 were both decided by senators representing a minority of Americans. Greg Price also critiqued the Court as minority rule.

The Federalist Society acted as a filter for judicial nominations during the first Trump administration, ensuring the latest conservative justices lean even further to the right. 86% of judges Trump appointed to circuit courts and the Supreme Court were Federalist Society members. David Litt critiques it as "an attempt to impose rigid ideological dogma on a profession once known for intellectual freedom." Kate Aronoff criticizes the donations from special interests like fossil fuel companies and other dark money groups to the Federalist Society and related organizations seeking to influence lawyers and Supreme Court Justices.

The 2016 stonewalling of Merrick Garland's confirmation and subsequent filling with Neil Gorsuch has been critiqued as a 'stolen seat' citing precedent from the 20th century of confirmations during election years, while proponents cited three blocked nominations between 1844 and 1866. In recent years, Democrats have accused Republican leaders such as Mitch McConnell of hypocrisy, as they were instrumental in blocking the nomination of Garland, but then quickly confirmed Amy Coney Barrett's nomination even though both vacancies occurred close to an election.

=== Ethics ===
Supreme Court justices have come under greater scrutiny since 2022, following public disclosures that began with the founder of Faith and Action admissions regarding the organization's long-term influence-peddling scheme, dubbed "Operation Higher Court", designed for wealthy donors among the religious right to gain access to the justices through events held by The Supreme Court Historical Society.

Ethical controversies have grown during the 2020s, with reports of justices (and their close family members) accepting expensive gifts, travel, business deals, and speaking fees without oversight or recusals from cases that present conflicts of interest. Spousal income and connections to cases has been redacted from the Justices' ethical disclosure forms while justices, such as Samuel Alito and Clarence Thomas, failed to disclose many large financial gifts including free vacations valued at as much as $500,000.

In 2024, Justices Alito and Thomas refused calls to recuse themselves from January 6 cases where their spouses have taken public stances or been involved in efforts to overturn the election. In 2017, Neil Gorsuch sold a property he co-owned for $1.8 million to the CEO of a prominent law firm, who was not listed on his ethics form when reporting a profit of between $250,000 and $500,000.

The criticism intensified after the 2024 Trump v. United States decision granted broad immunity to presidents, with Representative Alexandria Ocasio-Cortez saying she would introduce impeachment articles when Congress is back in session. On July 10, 2024, she filed Articles of Impeachment against Thomas and Alito, citing their "widely documented financial and personal entanglements". As of late July 2024, nearly 1.4 million people had signed a moveon.org petition asking Congress to remove Justice Thomas.

President Biden proposed term limits for justices, an enforceable ethics code, and elimination of "immunity for crimes a former president committed while in office".

Yale professor of constitutional law Akhil Reed Amar wrote an op-ed for The Atlantic titled Something Has Gone Deeply Wrong at the Supreme Court.

Other criticisms of the Court include weakening corruption laws impacting branches beyond the judiciary and citing falsehoods in written opinions, often supplied to the justices by amicus briefs from groups advocating a particular outcome. Allison Orr Larsen, Associate Dean at William & Mary Law School, wrote in Politico that the court should address this by requiring disclosure of all funders of amicus briefs and the studies they cite, only admit briefs that stay within the expertise of the authors (as is required in lower courts), and require the briefs to be submitted much earlier in the process so the history and facts have time to be challenged and uncovered.

==== Code of Conduct ====
On November 13, 2023, the court issued its first-ever Code of Conduct for Justices of the Supreme Court of the United States to set "ethics rules and principles that guide the conduct of the Members of the Court." The Code has been received by some as a significant first step but does not address the ethics concerns of many notable critics who found the Code was a significantly weakened version of the rules for other federal judges, let alone the legislature and the executive branch, while also lacking an enforcement mechanism. The Code's commentary denied past wrongdoing by saying that the Justices have largely abided by these principles and are simply publishing them now. This has prompted some criticism that the court hopes to legitimize past and future scandals through this Code.

The ethics rules guiding the justices are set and enforced by the justices themselves, meaning the members of the court have no external checks on their behavior other than the impeachment of a justice by Congress.

Chief Justice Roberts refused to testify before the Senate Judiciary Committee in April 2023, reasserting his desire for the Supreme Court to continue to monitor itself despite mounting ethics scandals. Lower courts, by contrast, discipline according to the 1973 Code of Conduct for U.S. judges which is enforced by the Judicial Conduct and Disability Act of 1980.

Article III, Section I, Constitution of the United States, 1776 establishes that the justices hold their office during good behavior. Thus far only one justice (Associate Justice Samuel Chase in 1804) has ever been impeached, and none has ever been removed from office.

The lack of external enforcement of ethics or other conduct violations makes the Supreme Court an outlier in modern organizational best-practices. 2024 reform legislation has been blocked by congressional Republicans.

==== Democratic backsliding ====
Thomas Keck argues that because the Court has historically not served as a strong bulwark for democracy, the Roberts Court had the opportunity to go down in history as a defender of democracy. However, he believes that if the court shields Trump from criminal prosecution (after ensuring his access to the ballot), then the risks that come with an anti-democratic status-quo of the current court will outweigh the dangers that come from court reform (including court packing). Aziz Z. Huq points to the blocking progress of democratizing institutions, increasing the disparity in wealth and power, and empowering an authoritarian white nationalist movement as evidence that the Supreme Court has created a "permanent minority" incapable of being defeated democratically.

In a July 2022 research paper entitled "The Supreme Court's Role in the Degradation of U.S. Democracy", the Campaign Legal Center, founded by Republican Trevor Potter, asserted that the Roberts Court "has turned on our democracy" and was on an "anti-democratic crusade" that had "accelerated and become increasingly extreme with the arrival" of Trump's three appointees. A 2024 op-ed by legal reporters Dahlia Lithwick and Mark Joseph Stern expressed a similar view.

=== Individual rights ===
Some of the most notable historical decisions that were criticized for failing to protect individual rights include the Dred Scott (1857) decision that said people of African descent could not be U.S. citizens or enjoy constitutionally protected rights and privileges, Plessy v. Ferguson (1896) that upheld segregation under the doctrine of separate but equal, the Civil Rights Cases (1883) and Slaughter-House Cases (1873) that all but undermined civil rights legislation enacted during the Reconstruction era.

However, others argue that the court is too protective of some individual rights, particularly those of people accused of crimes or in detention. For example, Chief Justice Warren Burger criticized the exclusionary rule, and Justice Scalia criticized Boumediene v. Bush for being too protective of the rights of Guantanamo detainees, arguing habeas corpus should be limited to sovereign territory.

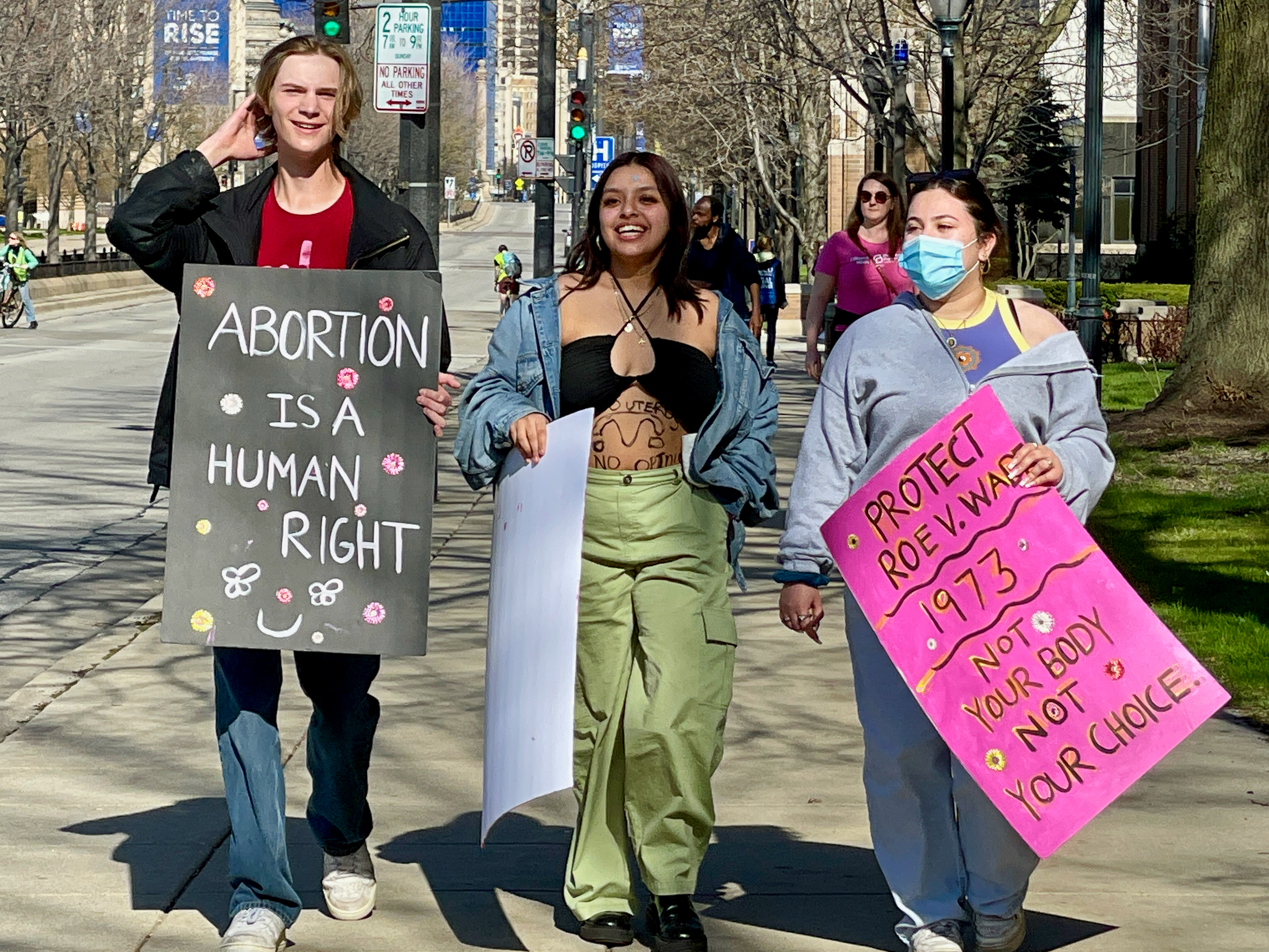
Protestors in support of keeping Roe v. Wade

After Dobbs v. Jackson Women's Health Organization (2022) overturned Roe v. Wade (1973), PBS reported that the case could start reconsideration of the doctrine of substantive due process, since a concurrence in the case by Justice Clarence Thomas argued for that. Substantive due process has been the main means used by the Supreme Court to incorporate the Bill of Rights against state and local governments. Justice Thomas has referred to it as 'legal fiction,' preferring the Privileges or Immunities Clause for incorporation.

=== Judicial activism ===
The Supreme Court has been criticized for engaging in judicial activism. This criticism is leveled by those who believe the court should not interpret the law in any way besides through the lens of past precedent or textualism. However, those on both sides of the political aisle often level this accusation at the court. The debate around judicial activism typically involves accusing the other side of activism, whilst denying that your own side engages in it.

Conservatives often cite the decision in Roe v. Wade (1973) as an example of liberal judicial activism. In its decision, the court legalized abortion on the basis of a "right to privacy" that they found inherent in the Due Process Clause of the Fourteenth Amendment. Roe v. Wade was overturned nearly fifty years later by Dobbs v. Jackson (2022), ending the recognition of abortion access as a constitutional right and returning the issue of abortion back to the states. David Litt criticized the decision in Dobbs as activism on the part of the court's conservative majority because the court failed to respect past precedent, eschewing the principle of stare decisis that usually guides the court's decisions.

The decision in Brown v. Board of Education, which banned racial segregation in public schools was also criticized as activist by conservatives Pat Buchanan, Robert Bork and Barry Goldwater. More recently, Citizens United v. Federal Election Commission was criticized for expanding upon the precedent in First National Bank of Boston v. Bellotti (1978) that the First Amendment applies to corporations.

=== Outdated and an outlier ===
Foreign Policy writer Colm Quinn says that a criticism leveled at the court, as well as other American institutions, is that after two centuries they are beginning to look their age. He cites four features of the United States Supreme Court that make it different from high courts in other countries, and help explain why polarization is an issue in the United States court:

- It is high-profile: the high court in the United States is one of the few courts in the world that can unilaterally strike down legislation passed by other politically accountable branches.
- The United States Constitution is very difficult to amend: other countries allow for constitutional changes via referendum or with a supermajority in the legislature.
- The United States Supreme Court has a politicized nominating process.
- The United States Supreme Court lacks term limits or mandatory retirements.

Adam Liptak wrote in 2008 that the court has declined in relevance in other constitutional courts. He cites factors like American exceptionalism, the relatively few updates to the constitution or the courts, the rightward shift of the court and the diminished stature of the United States abroad.

=== Power ===
Michael Waldman argued that no other country gives its Supreme Court as much power. Warren E. Burger, before becoming Chief Justice, argued that since the Supreme Court has such "unreviewable power", it is likely to "self-indulge itself", and unlikely to "engage in dispassionate analysis". Larry Sabato wrote that the federal courts, and especially the Supreme Court, have excessive power. Suja A. Thomas argues the Supreme Court has taken most of the constitutionally defined power from juries in the United States for itself thanks in part to the influence of legal elites and companies that prefer judges over juries as well as the inability of the jury to defend its power.

Some members of Congress considered the results from the 2021–2022 term a shift of government power into the Supreme Court, and a "judicial coup". The 2021–2022 term of the court was the first full term following the appointment of three judges by Republican president Donald Trump — Neil Gorsuch, Brett Kavanaugh, and Amy Coney Barrett — which created a six-strong conservative majority on the court. Subsequently, at the end of the term, the court issued a number of decisions that favored this conservative majority while significantly changing the landscape with respect to rights. These included Dobbs v. Jackson Women's Health Organization which overturned Roe v. Wade and Planned Parenthood v. Casey in recognizing abortion is not a constitutional right, New York State Rifle & Pistol Association, Inc. v. Bruen which made public possession of guns a protected right under the Second Amendment, Carson v. Makin and Kennedy v. Bremerton School District which both weakened the Establishment Clause separating church and state, and West Virginia v. EPA which weakened the power of executive branch agencies to interpret their congressional mandate.

==== Federalism debate ====
There has been debate throughout American history about the boundary between federal and state power. While Framers such as James Madison and Alexander Hamilton argued in The Federalist Papers that their then-proposed Constitution would not infringe on the power of state governments, others argue that expansive federal power is good and consistent with the Framers' wishes. The Tenth Amendment to the United States Constitution explicitly states that "powers not delegated to the United States by the Constitution, nor prohibited by it to the States, are reserved to the States respectively, or to the people."

The court has been criticized for giving the federal government too much power to interfere with state authority. One criticism is that it has allowed the federal government to misuse the Commerce Clause by upholding regulations and legislation which have little to do with interstate commerce, but that were enacted under the guise of regulating interstate commerce; and by voiding state legislation for allegedly interfering with interstate commerce. For example, the Commerce Clause was used by the Fifth Circuit Court of Appeals to uphold the Endangered Species Act, thus protecting six endemic species of insect near Austin, Texas, despite the fact that the insects had no commercial value and did not travel across state lines; the Supreme Court let that ruling stand without comment in 2005. Chief Justice John Marshall asserted Congress's power over interstate commerce was "complete in itself, may be exercised to its utmost extent, and acknowledges no limitations, other than are prescribed in the Constitution." Justice Alito said congressional authority under the Commerce Clause is "quite broad"; commentator Robert B. Reich suggests debate over the Commerce Clause continues today.

Advocates of states' rights, such as constitutional scholar Kevin Gutzman, have also criticized the court, saying it has misused the Fourteenth Amendment to undermine state authority. Justice Brandeis, in arguing for allowing the states to operate without federal interference, suggested that states should be laboratories of democracy. One critic wrote "the great majority of Supreme Court rulings of unconstitutionality involve state, not federal, law." Others see the Fourteenth Amendment as a positive force that extends "protection of those rights and guarantees to the state level."

More recently, in Gamble v. United States, the Court examined the doctrine of "separate sovereigns", whereby a criminal defendant can be prosecuted in state court as well as federal court on separate charges for the same offense.

=== Ruling on political questions ===
Some Court decisions have been criticized for injecting the court into the political arena, and deciding questions that are the purview of the elected branches of government. The Bush v. Gore decision, in which the Supreme Court intervened in the 2000 presidential election, awarding George W. Bush the presidency over Al Gore, received scrutiny as political based on the controversial justifications used by the five conservative justices to elevate a fellow conservative to the presidency. The ruling was also controversial in applying logic only for that race, as opposed to drawing on or creating consistent precedent.

=== Secretive proceedings ===
The court has been criticized for keeping its deliberations hidden from public view. For example, the increasing use of a 'shadow docket' facilitates the court making decisions in secret without knowing how each Justice came to their decision. In 2024, after comparing the analysis of shadow-docket decisions to Kremlinology, Matt Ford called this trend of secrecy "increasingly troubling", arguing the court's power comes entirely from persuasion and explanation.

A 2007 review of Jeffrey Toobin's book compared the Court to a cartel where its inner-workings are mostly unknown, arguing this lack of transparency reduces scrutiny which hurts ordinary Americans who know little about the nine extremely consequential Justices. A 2010 poll found that 61% of American voters agreed that televising Court hearings would "be good for democracy", and 50% of voters stated they would watch Court proceedings if they were televised.

=== Too few cases ===
Ian Millhiser of Vox speculates that the decades-long decline in cases heard could be due to the increasing political makeup of judges, that he says might be more interested in settling political disputes than legal ones.

=== Too slow ===
British constitutional scholar Adam Tomkins sees flaws in the American system of having courts (and specifically the Supreme Court) act as checks on the Executive and Legislative branches; he argues that because the courts must wait, sometimes for years, for cases to navigate their way through the system, their ability to restrain other branches is severely weakened. In contrast, various other countries have a dedicated constitutional court that has original jurisdiction on constitutional claims brought by persons or political institutions; for example, the Federal Constitutional Court of Germany, which can declare a law unconstitutional when challenged.

Critics have accused the Court of "slow-walking" important cases relating to then-former president Donald Trump in order to benefit his election chances in the face of the 2024 United States presidential election. The Court is considering a presidential immunity claim as part of the Federal prosecution of Donald Trump (election obstruction case). Critics argue that the Court has acted slowly in order to delay this case until after the election. They point out that the Court can move quickly when it wants to, as it did when it disregarded typical procedures in Bush v. Gore, granting the petition on a Saturday, receiving briefs on Sunday, holding oral arguments on Monday, and issuing the final opinion on Tuesday. Author Sonja West, of Slate, argues that the Federal prosecution of Donald Trump (election obstruction case) is of similar importance to Bush v. Gore and should therefore be treated as expeditiously, but the Court seems to be taking the opposite approach.

=== Leaks and inadvertent publications ===
Sometimes draft opinions are deliberately leaked or inadvertently released before they are published. Such releases are often purported to harm the court's reputation. Chief Justice Roberts has previously described leaks as an "egregious breach of trust" that "undermine the integrity of our operations" in reference to the leaked draft opinion for Dobbs v. Jackson Women's Health Organization.

In addition to leaks, the Court has sometimes mistakenly released opinions before they are ready to be published. On June 26, 2024, the Court inadvertently posted an opinion for Moyle v. United States to its website that seemed to indicate that the court would temporarily allow abortions in medical emergencies in Idaho. The official opinion was posted the next day, which returned the case to the lower courts without a ruling on the merits.

== See also ==
- Judicial appointment history for United States federal courts
- List of courts which publish audio or video of arguments
- List of pending United States Supreme Court cases
- List of presidents of the United States by judicial appointments
- List of supreme courts by country
- Lists of United States Supreme Court cases
- Models of judicial decision making
- Reporter of Decisions of the Supreme Court of the United States
- Supreme Court reform in the United States

=== Selected landmark Supreme Court decisions ===
- Marbury v. Madison (1803, judicial review)
- McCulloch v. Maryland (1819, implied powers)
- Gibbons v. Ogden (1824, interstate commerce)
- Dred Scott v. Sandford (1857, slavery)
- Civil Rights Cases (1883, civil rights law)
- Plessy v. Ferguson (1896, segregation)
- United States v. Wong Kim Ark (1898, birthright citizenship)
- Lochner v. New York (1905, labor law)
- Buck v. Bell (1927, forced sterilization)
- Wickard v. Filburn (1942, interstate commerce)
- Korematsu v. U.S. (1944, Japanese internment)
- Brown v. Board of Education (1954, school segregation of races)
- Engel v. Vitale (1962, religious activities in public schools)
- Abington School District v. Schempp (1963, religious activities in public schools)
- Gideon v. Wainwright (1963, right to an attorney)
- Griswold v. Connecticut (1965, contraception)
- Miranda v. Arizona (1966, rights of those detained by police)
- Loving v. Virginia (1967, interracial marriage)
- Lemon v. Kurtzman (1971, religious activities in public schools)
- New York Times Co. v. United States (1971, freedom of the press)
- Eisenstadt v. Baird (1972, contraception)
- Roe v. Wade (1973, abortion)
- Miller v. California (1973, obscenity)
- United States v. Nixon (1974, executive privilege)
- Buckley v. Valeo (1976, campaign finance)
- Chevron v. N.R.D.C. (1984, Chevron deference)
- Bush v. Gore (2000, presidential election)
- Lawrence v. Texas (2003, sodomy)
- District of Columbia v. Heller (2008, gun rights)
- Citizens United v. FEC (2010, campaign finance)
- United States v. Windsor (2013, same-sex marriage)
- Shelby County v. Holder (2013, voting rights)
- Obergefell v. Hodges (2015, same-sex marriage)
- Bostock v. Clayton County (2020, discrimination on LGBT workers)
- McGirt v. Oklahoma (2020, tribal reservation rights)
- Dobbs v. Jackson Women's Health Organization (2022, abortion)
- New York State Rifle and Pistol Association v. Bruen (2022, firearms)
- Students for Fair Admissions v. Harvard (2023, affirmative action)
- Loper Bright Enterprises v. Raimondo (2024, overruled Chevron deference)
- Trump v. United States (2024) (presidential immunity)
