= Pantsuit =

Woman's ensemble consisting of trousers and coat or jacket

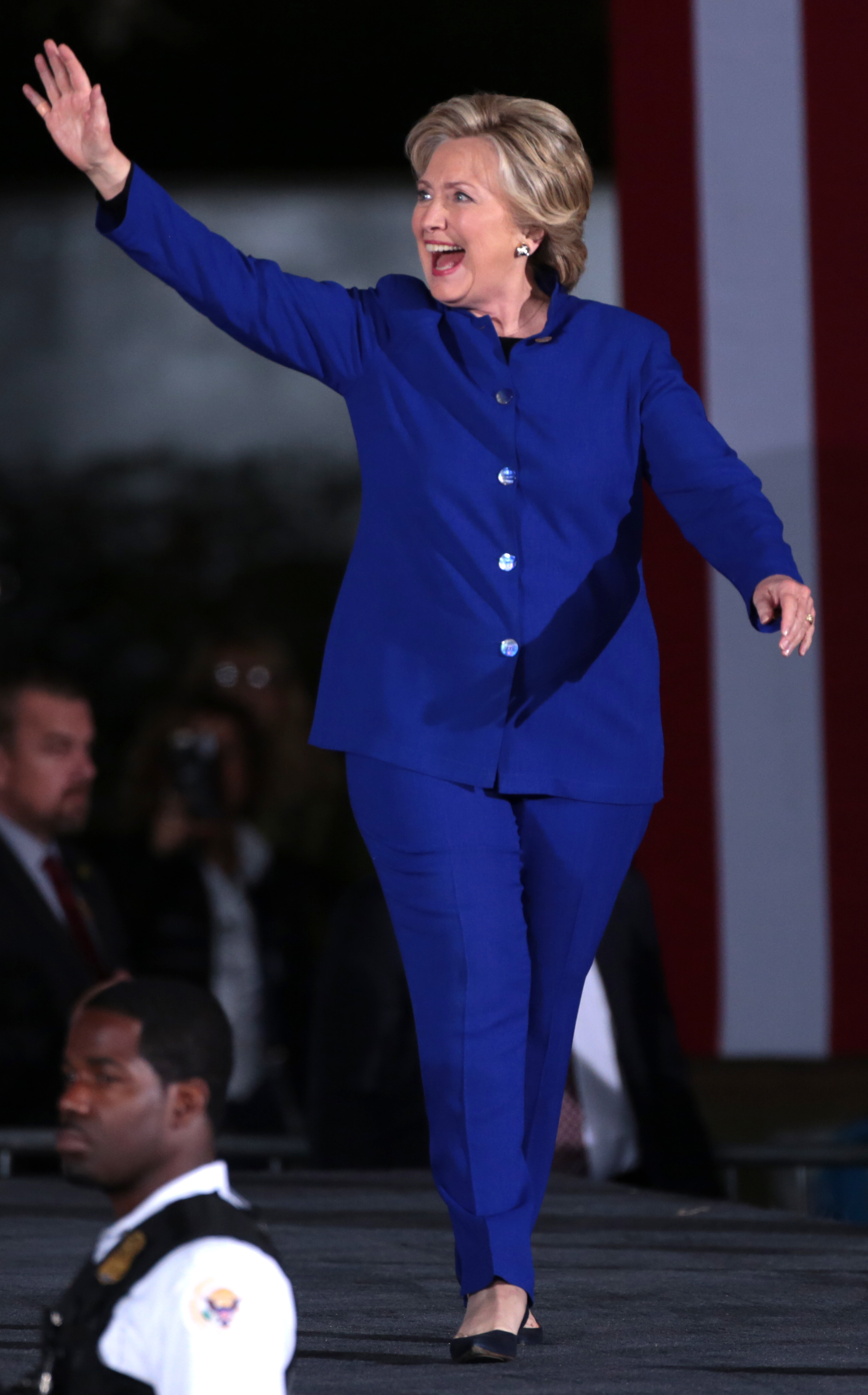
Hillary Clinton wearing a pantsuit at a 2016 campaign rally.

A pantsuit, also known as a trouser suit outside the United States, is a woman's suit of clothing consisting of pants and a matching or coordinating coat or jacket.

In the past, the prevailing fashion for women included some form of a coat, paired with a skirt or dress—hence the name pantsuit.

== History ==
The pantsuit was introduced in the 1920s, when a small number of women adopted a masculine style, including pantsuits, hats, canes and monocles. However, the term "trouser suit" had been used in Britain during the First World War, with reference to women working in heavy industry.

During the 1960s pantsuits for women became increasingly widespread. Designers such as Foale and Tuffin in London and Luba Marks in the United States were early promoters of trouser suits. In 1966 Yves Saint-Laurent introduced his Le Smoking, an evening pantsuit for women that mimicked a man's tuxedo. Whilst Saint-Laurent is often credited with introducing trouser suits, it was noted in 1968 that some of his pantsuits were very similar to designs that had already been offered by Luba Marks, and the London designer Ossie Clark had offered a trouser suit for women in 1964 that predated Saint Laurent's 'Le Smoking' design by two years. In Britain a social watershed was crossed in 1967 when Lady Chichester, wife of the navigator Sir Francis Chichester, wore a trouser suit when her husband was publicly knighted by Queen Elizabeth II.

In the past, pantsuits were often deprecated as inappropriately masculine clothing for women. For example, until 1993, women were not permitted to wear pantsuits (or pants of any kind) on the United States Senate floor. In 1993, Senators Barbara Mikulski and Carol Moseley Braun wore pants onto the floor in defiance of the rule, and female support staff followed soon after, with the rule being amended later that year by Senate Sergeant-at-Arms Martha S. Pope to allow women to wear pants on the floor so long as they also wore a jacket, thus allowing pantsuits, among other types of clothing.

Pantsuit Nation was a private Facebook group and Twitter hashtag used to rally Hillary Clinton supporters during her 2016 presidential campaign in the United States. The group was not affiliated with a political party, but its symbol, the pantsuit, was used as a metonym for Hillary Clinton's 2016 presidential campaign – similarly to how red-colored hats were used for the campaign of her opponent, Donald Trump.

== Gallery ==
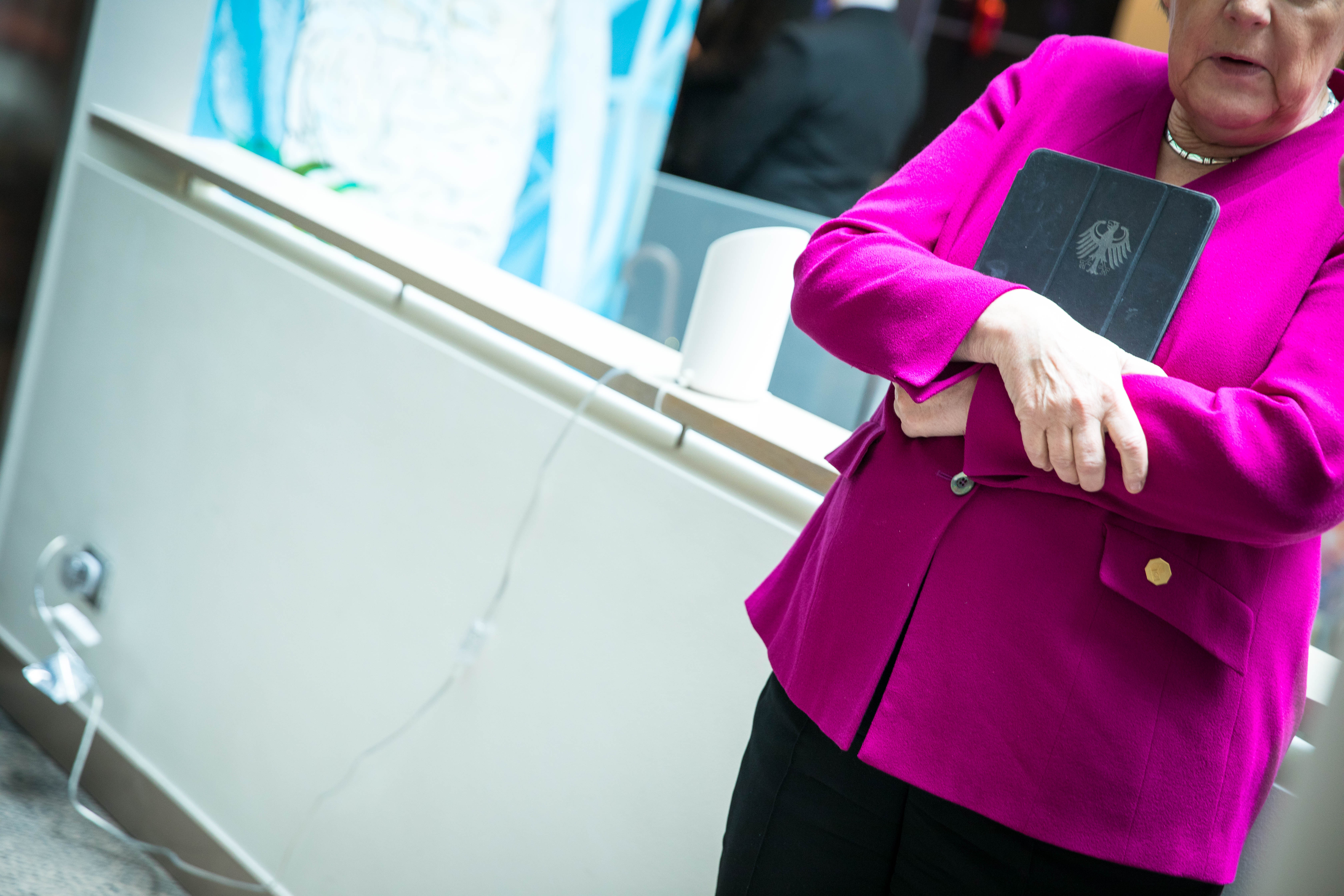
Angela Merkel wearing the trouser suit during May 2019 European People's Party Summit in Brussels

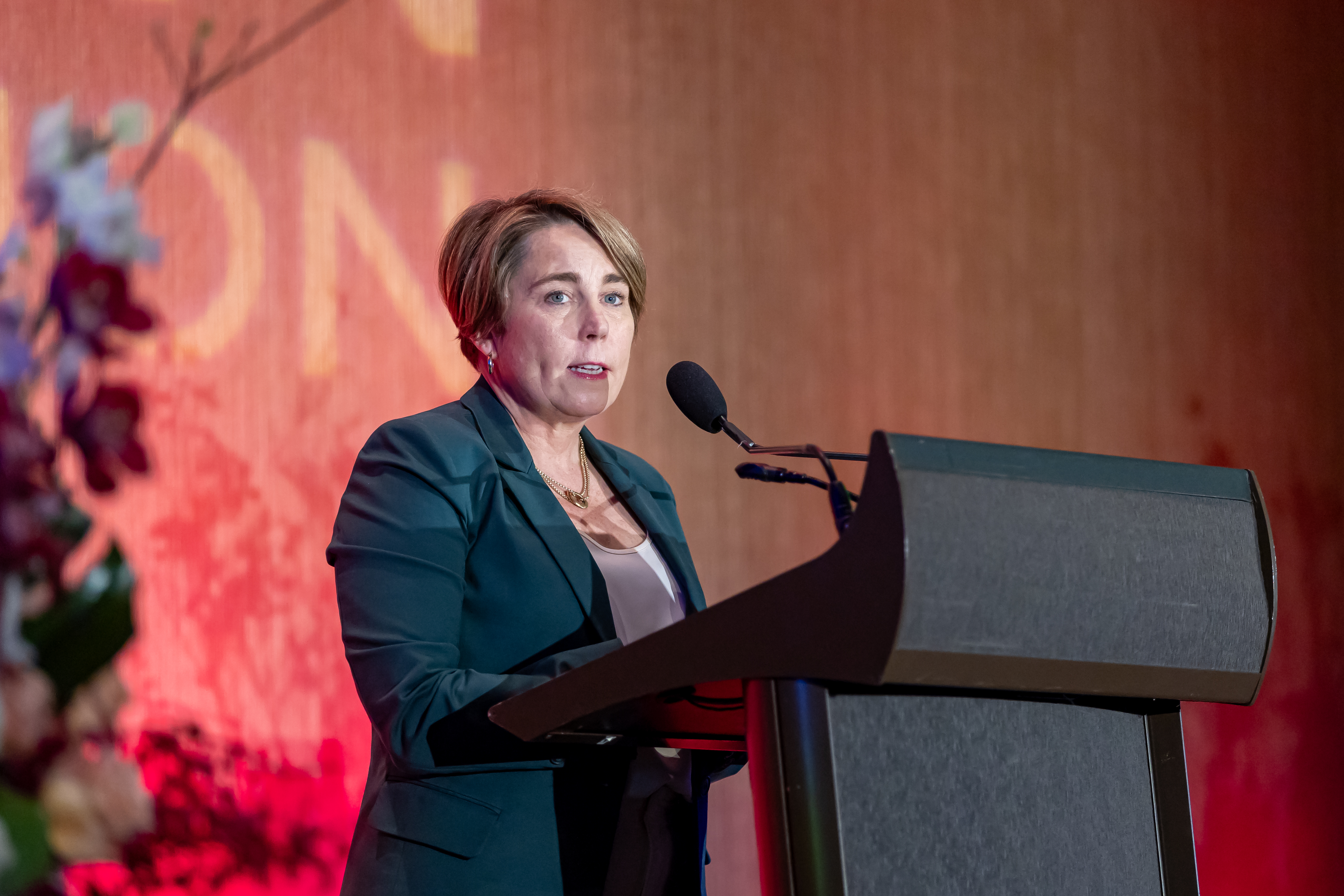
Governor Maura Healey wearing a pantsuit during a speech, May 2025

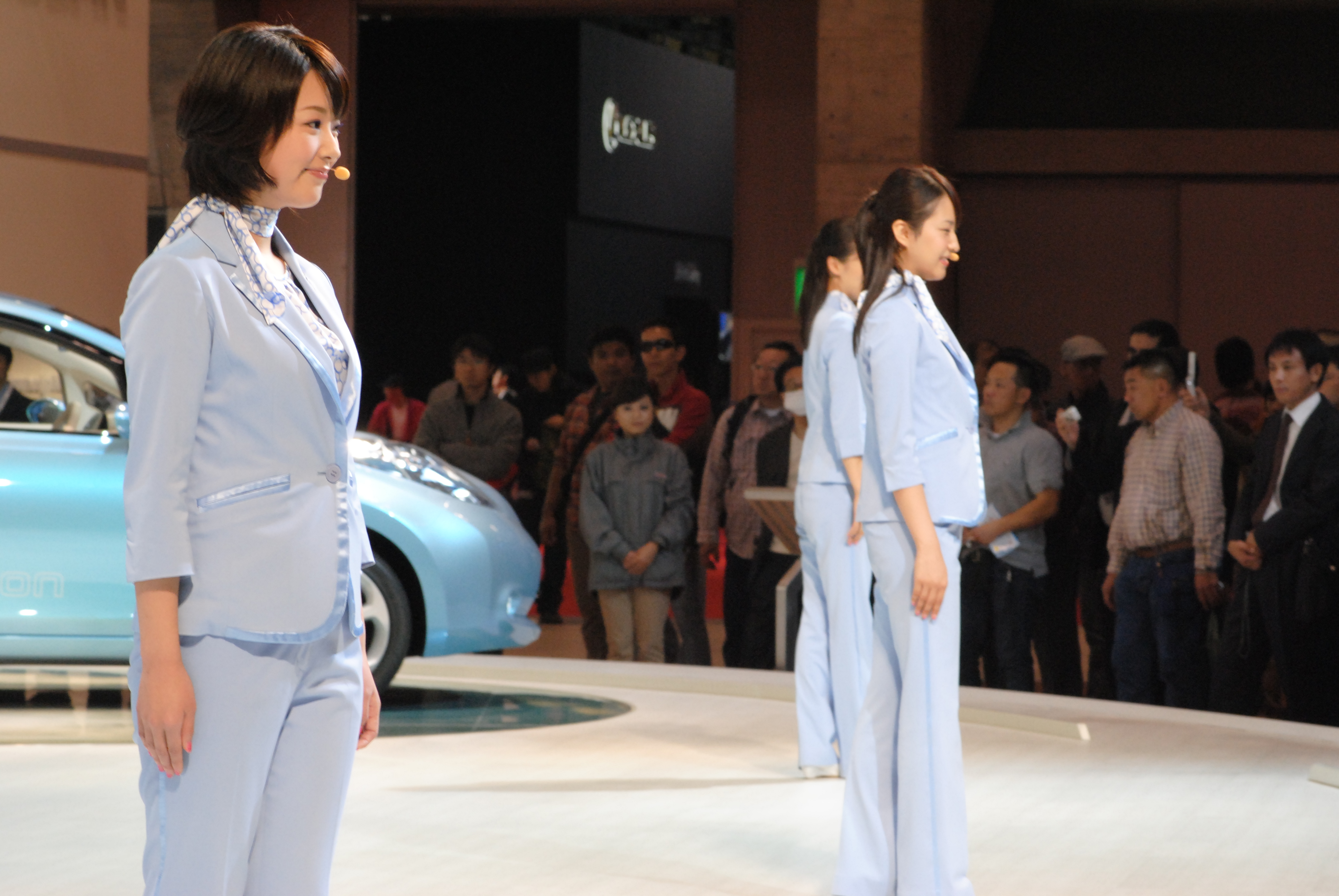
Nissan promotional models wear pantsuits at the 2009 Tokyo Motor Show, Japan

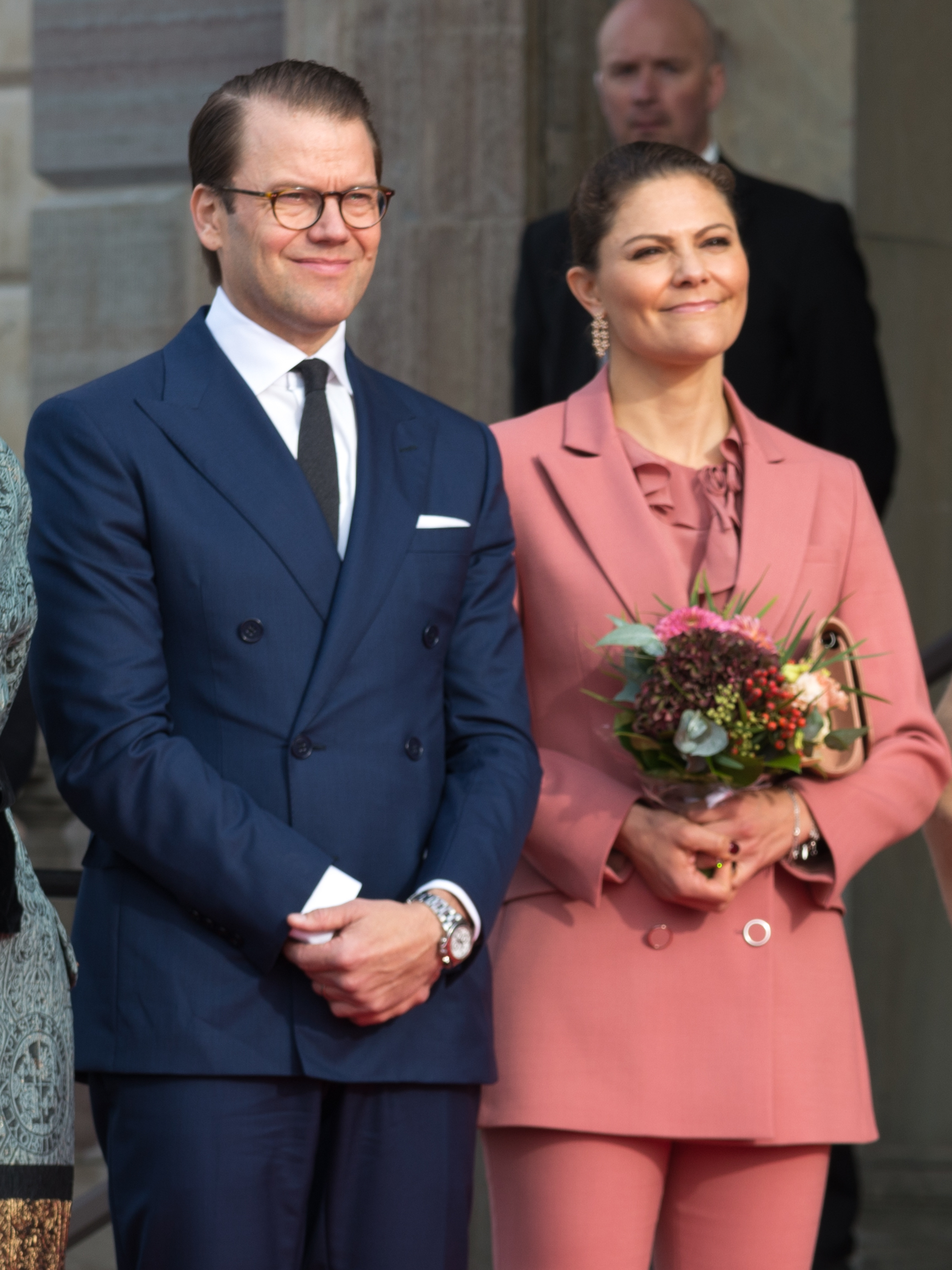
Victoria, Crown Princess of Sweden (right) wears a trouser suit in 2018

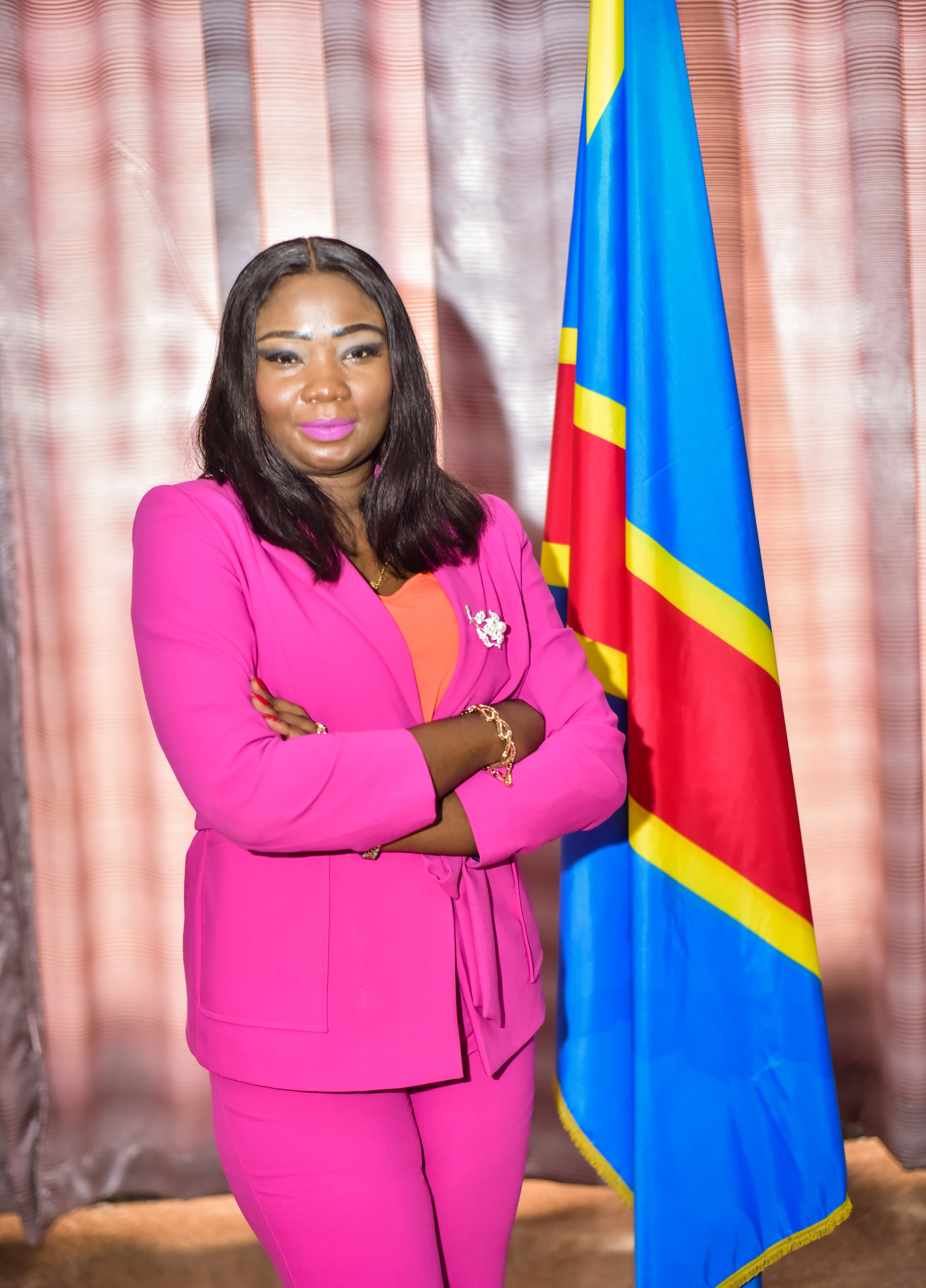
Congolese politician Christelle Vuanga wears a pink pantsuit near the flag of the Democratic Republic of the Congo in 2022

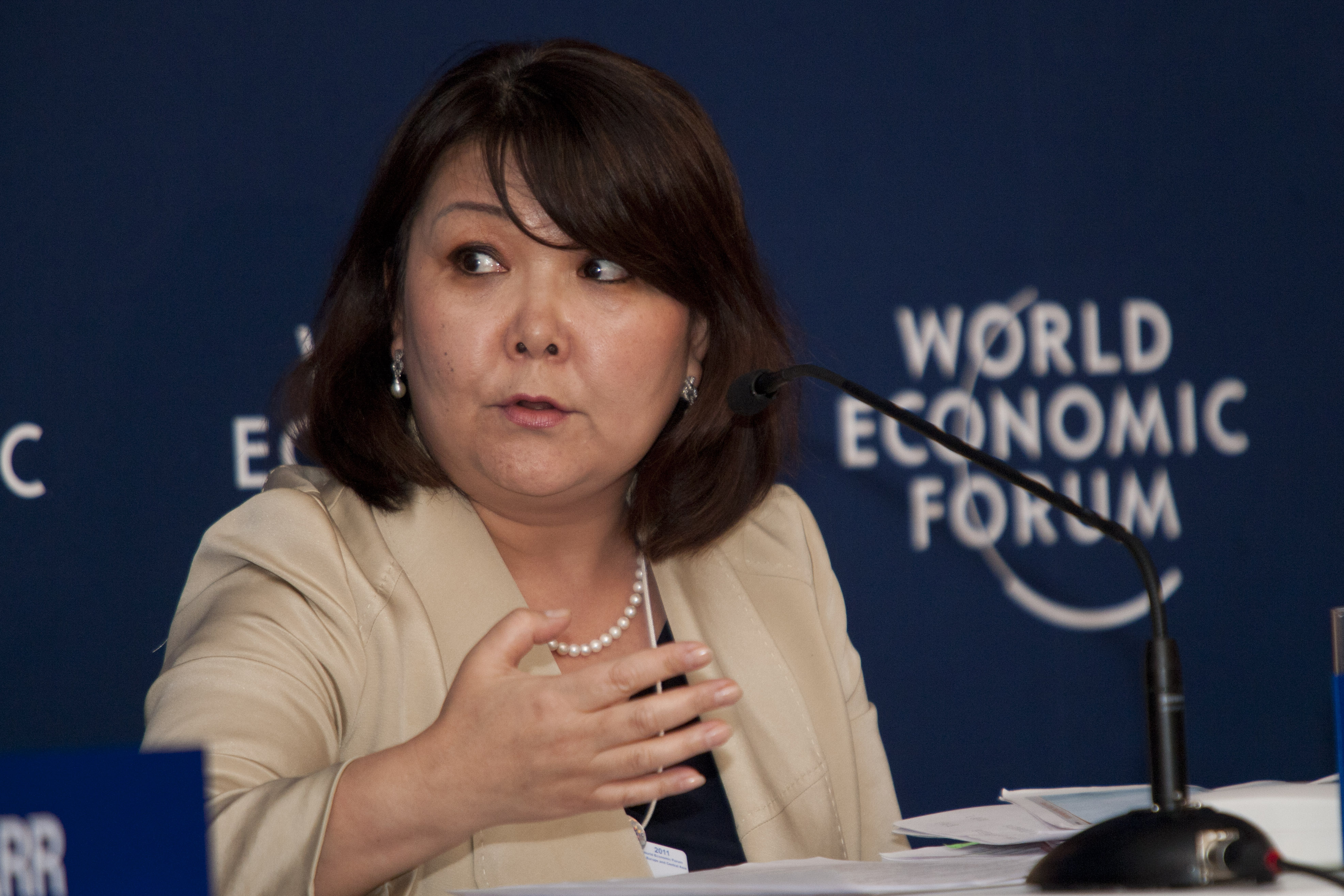
Kazakh politician Janar Aitjanova wears a pantsuit during a World Economic Forum meeting in 2011

== See also ==
- Business wear
- Trousers as women's clothing
