= Zara Rahim =

American communications strategist and political adviser

- Born: 1989 or 1990 (age 35–36)
- Education: University of South Florida (B.A.)
- Political party: Democratic

Zara Rahim (born 1989 or 1990) is an American communications strategist and political adviser. She served in the White House's Office of Digital Strategy during the Obama administration and was a national spokeswoman for Hillary Clinton 2016 presidential campaign. Rahim subsequently held communications roles at Uber, Vogue, and The Wing. In 2025, she acted as a senior adviser to Zohran Mamdani's campaign for Mayor of New York City.

== Early life and education ==
Rahim was born in 1989 or 1990 and raised in Port St. Lucie, Florida. She is a first-generation Bangladeshi American. Her parents, who owned a convenience store in Florida, are survivors of the 1971 Bangladesh genocide. Raised in a Muslim family, Rahim attended a Christian elementary school. She has described this period as formative to her identity, noting that her mother instructed her to remain respectful of the environment while retaining her own faith.

During high school, Rahim was an International Baccalaureate student and played the violin. She attended the University of South Florida, graduating with a degree in International Studies and Spanish. During her college years, she studied abroad in Spain for a semester. In 2010, she interned for Muhammad Yunus at the Yunus Centre.

== Career ==
=== Early political work ===
Rahim began volunteering for political campaigns at age 14 during the John Kerry 2004 presidential campaign. She later volunteered for the Barack Obama 2008 presidential campaign.

In 2011, Rahim accepted an internship with Obama's reelection campaign. She was hired full-time a few months later, temporarily leaving school to work on the campaign. Starting as an intern for Obama for America in January 2012, she became the digital content director for Florida shortly thereafter. Following the campaign, she worked as the digital manager for Tampa mayor Bob Buckhorn as of August 2013. In that role, she worked on development projects such as an app for the city and a marketing campaign for bicycle safety.

Rahim served in the White House's Office of Digital Strategy (ODS) from 2013 to 2014. During her time with ODS, she worked on the digital team, managing platforms such as whitehouse.gov and social media channels.

=== Private sector ===
After leaving the White House, Rahim worked at Uber, where she focused on drafting legislation for ride-sharing. She left Uber to serve as a national spokeswoman for the Hillary Clinton 2016 presidential campaign.

Following the 2016 election, Rahim transitioned to the fashion industry. She was hired as the deputy to the communications director at Vogue and was promoted to communications director six months later. She left Vogue in June 2018 during a company restructuring. Later that year, she became the first communications director for The Wing, a women's networking space.

In April 2020, Rahim began working as a self-employed consultant. Her clients have included entertainment companies and figures such as A24, Netflix, and Mariah Carey.

In October 2020, following U.S. president Donald Trump's diagnosis with COVID-19, Rahim posted a tweet stating, "It's been against my moral identity to tweet this for the past four years, but, I hope he dies." The tweet was deleted shortly after posting.

==== 2025 New York City mayoral campaign ====
In February 2025, during the New York City mayoral election, Rahim joined Zohran Mamdani's campaign as a senior adviser. She advised Mamdani to focus his campaign on the "actual New York City" rather than political abstractions, a strategy credited with helping mobilize voters in overlooked communities. Following Mamdani's victory in November 2025, Rahim was appointed to his all-female transition team. The New York Times reported that Rahim served as an important pro-Palestinian voice during the campaign's discussions regarding the Gaza Strip.

== Personal life ==
As of 2025, Rahim resides in New York City. She is a fan of the Los Angeles Lakers. Her mother splits her time between the United States and Bangladesh. Rahim has a strong interest in fashion.
