= Alabama Together =

Political group in Alabama, U.S.

Alabama Together is a progressive political group located in Auburn, Alabama. The group was founded in December 2016.

== History ==
Alabama Together was founded shortly after the 2016 presidential election. The organization, which grew out of a private Pantsuit Nation Facebook group, held its first official meeting in December 2016; the meeting attracted over 100 attendees.

According to an opinion/editorial in The New York Times, in 2018, Alabama Together helped support about "a dozen women running for office for the first time, part of a surge of new Democratic candidates in the state challenging long-serving Republican incumbents." In August 2018, Alabama Together member Bob Parsons was elected to a seat on Auburn City Council. Members have also run for Congress, state legislature, and state school board.

On August 16, 2018, Alabama Together hosted a Civic Forum to give voters the opportunity to learn about candidates for state office and candidates for Alabama's 3rd congressional district. In April 2017, Alabama Together organized a civic forum and invited Congressman Mike Rogers (R) to participate. At the time, Rogers had not held a public forum in Lee County in over two years. Alabama Together spent months reaching out to Rogers. Rogers did not acknowledge the invitation, and the forum was held in his absence.

Alabama Together has organized political marches, including a March for Science in Auburn, Alabama, in April 2017. Alabama Together also participated in two annual Pride on the Plains events, the first municipal pride events ever held in Auburn and Opelika, Alabama; Pride on the Plains was covered in the New York Times.
