= Pantsuit Nation =

Facebook group supporting Hillary Clinton

Pantsuit Nation's Logo

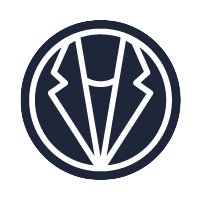
Pantsuit Nation's Logo (enlarged)

Pantsuit Nation was a private Facebook group and Twitter hashtag used to rally Hillary Clinton supporters during her 2016 presidential campaign in the United States. The group was not affiliated with a political party, but its symbol, the pantsuit, was used as a metonym for Hillary Clinton's 2016 presidential campaign – similarly to how red-colored hats were used for the campaign of her opponent, Donald Trump.

Members of the group focus on immigration reform, racial justice, religious freedom, and women's reproductive rights. During the November 2016 U.S. presidential election, the group had 2.9 million members and has raised up to $170,000 for the Clinton campaign. Currently, the group has around 2.9 million members, while at its peak it hit 4 million.

In 2019, the group was bought out by Supermajority Education Fund, but the organization chose to pause the community as of March 18, 2023.

== Background ==
On 20 October 2016, Libby Chamberlain, a private resident of Brooklin, Maine, created Pantsuit Nation, an invite-only Facebook group to follow the third presidential debate. Chamberlain graduated from Yale University in 2006. A mother of two, she previously worked for an environmental non-profit; and as a college and career counselor at a high school in Maine. Chamberlain started Pantsuit Nation in an effort to encourage a few of her Facebook friends to wear pantsuits to honor Clinton's trademark campaign garb and get to the voting polls in support of the nation's first female presidential candidate nominated by a major party. She considered Clinton and her pantsuits to be an emblem of the historic effort towards equal rights for women. Pantsuit Nation began with only 30 members, but gained traction quickly, growing to 24,000 members overnight and to 2.9 million by 8 November 2016.

On 8 November 2016, the Clinton campaign's digital manager personally thanked Pantsuit Nation for its support. When Clinton did not win the 2016 presidential election, she too thanked the group's army of supporters in her concession speech and encouraged them to voice their opinions proudly and publicly, outside the realm of a secret group. After the election, Pantsuit Nation inspired spinoffs across the country, including Alabama Together, a group in Auburn, Alabama, one of the communities that were rocked in 2017 by visits from white supremacists and Nazi-sympathizers.

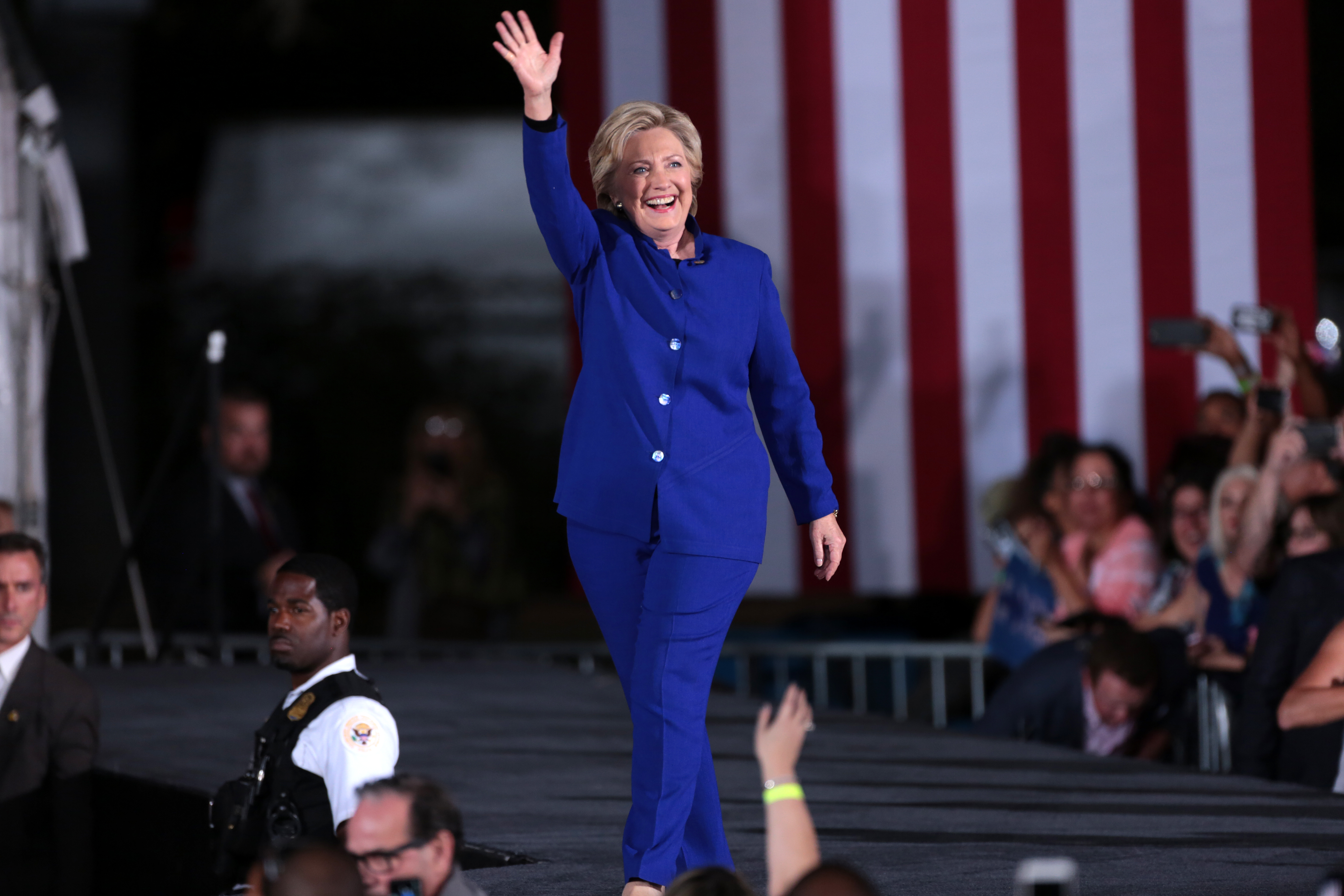
Hillary Clinton in her signature pantsuit

Pantsuit Nation consisted of people of different age groups, ethnicities, and political alliances. The group started as a space for members to share stories and pictures for their support of Clinton but has since transformed to encompass a wider range of progressive, anti-Trump subject matter. Group members share in detail their experiences as women, members of the LGBTQ community, immigrants, racial minorities, and religious minorities.

The Trump administration's actions against transgender individuals and immigrants, particularly his announcement to end the DACA program, have sparked flurries of activity on the page. Members have felt emboldened and empowered by the community Pantsuit Nation provides. Posts to the group contain fan art from the campaign, including its logos and slogans on clothes, signs, bodies, and food.

== Organizers ==
The leadership of Pantsuit Nation consists of five executive members and 80 volunteer moderators as well as chapter leaders. Libby Chamberlain is Director of Content, Cortney Tunis is executive director, Cat Plein is Chief Operating Officer, Grace Caldara is Director of Engagement, and Kimma Barry is Director of Community Relations.

== Chapters ==
After the success of the Facebook group, organizers expanded the Pantsuit Nation brand to include regional chapters, whose mission is to promote story-driven activism. The chapters give members the chance to meet like-minded activists in person, so they can share resources and work together to stimulate social change. There are chapters in Alaska, California, Northern Colorado, Connecticut, Washington D.C., Central Florida, Idaho, Illinois, Indiana, Kentucky, Boston, Missouri, New Jersey, New York, North Carolina, Ohio, Oregon, Philadelphia, Pittsburgh, Texas, Virginia, Washington, Milwaukee, and Israel.

== Criticism ==
After the election, Chamberlain received a book deal to publish content from the group. The book Pantsuit Nation was published May 9, 2017, by Flatiron Books and is a compilation of stories and photos that document the experiences of Clinton supporters before, during, and after the election. Some believe that Chamberlain is turning Pantsuit Nation from a space of grieving and healing into a branding machine, used to further her own profit-seeking ambitions. Before Chamberlain announced on the Pantsuit Nation Facebook group that she had secured a book deal using the group's name, The New York Times released an article explaining the book's projected timeline.

Chamberlain subsequently said in a Facebook post that the book's proceeds will be donated to nonprofit organizations connected to Pantsuit Nation's mission. Examples of such organizations the ACLU, Southern Poverty Law Center, and Planned Parenthood. She also stated that participation in the book is voluntary. She said the book is meant to illustrate the diversity that the group represents – diversity of experiences, race, ethnicity, gender, sexual orientation, and ability.

Early critics of Pantsuit Nation had argued that white women dominated the conversation in the group and members of racial minorities felt their voices are ignored, belittled, and overshadowed. In response, Pantsuit Nation organizers released a statement in December 2016 reaffirming the group's commitment to ensuring that every voice is heard and respected and asking that white women be aware of their privilege by listening to the experiences of women of color. The leadership of Pantsuit Nation also changed, becoming more diverse and representing a broader range of perspectives, experiences, and identities.

== See also ==
- Trousers as women's clothing
