= Stephanie Hannon =

American CTO (born 1974)

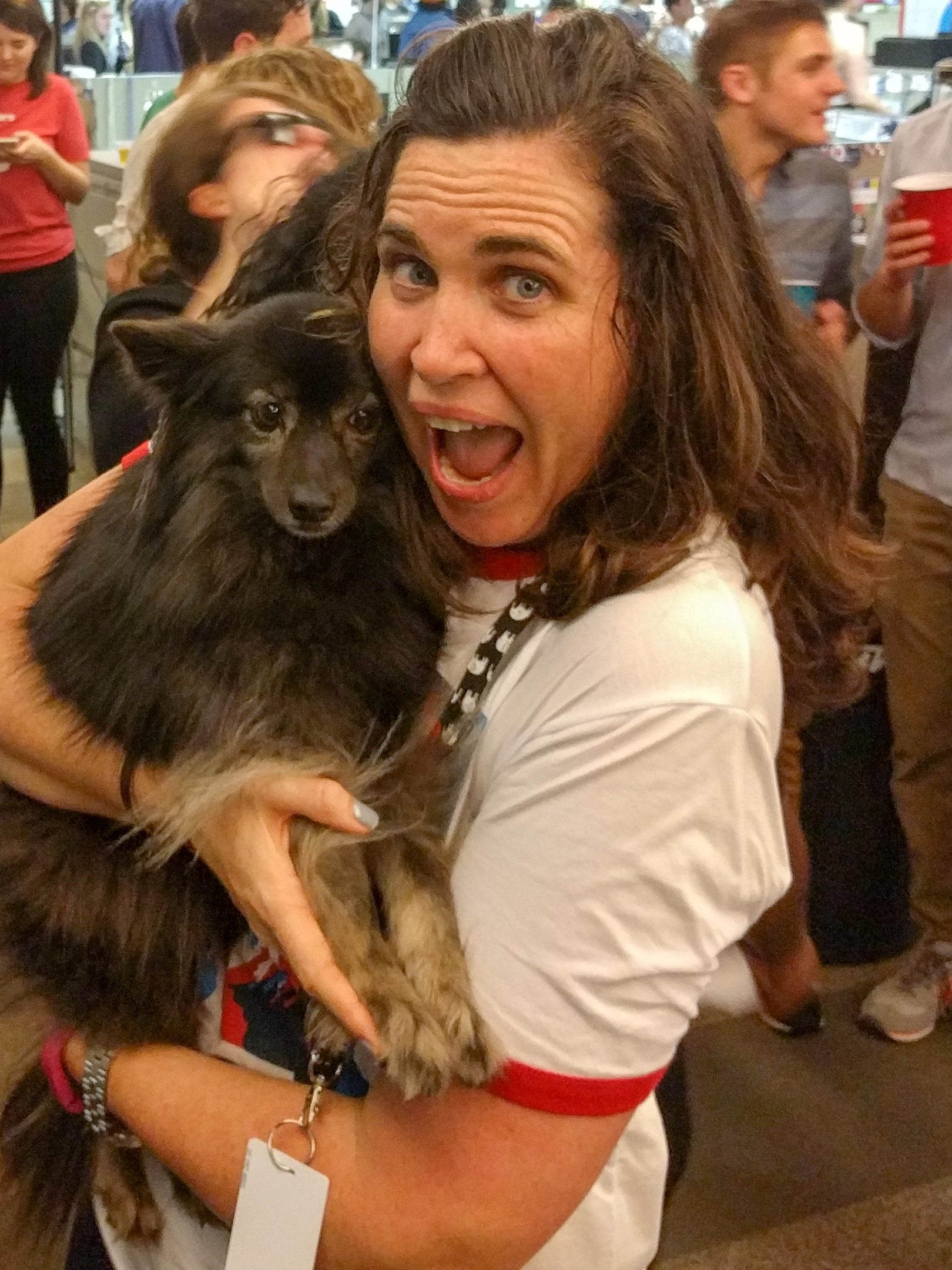
- Hannon in 2016
- Born: October 31, 1974 (age 52); Washington, D.C., U.S.
- Education: Stanford University; Harvard University
- Occupations: CTO of Hillary Clinton presidential campaign, 2016, Product Management Director at Google
- Political party: Democratic

Stephanie Hannon (born October 31, 1974) was the chief technology officer (CTO) of Hillary Clinton's 2016 presidential campaign. She was the first woman to hold the title of CTO on a major presidential campaign. Prior to working for the Clinton campaign, Hannon was Google's director of product management for civic innovation and social impact. Her focus was on building tools to help communities respond to natural disasters as well as producing and sharing transparent election results. Previously, she held product leadership roles at Facebook and Eventbrite, and helped launch Google Maps in Europe and Google Wave. After the Clinton campaign, she joined Greylock Partners and then became the chief product officer at Strava.

== Early life and education ==
Hannon was born in Washington, D.C., and grew up in Reston, Virginia. She went to Virginia's Thomas Jefferson High School for Science and Technology. She earned a bachelor's degree in computer systems engineering and a master's degree in electrical engineering at Stanford University as well as a master of business administration degree at Harvard Business School.

== 2016 presidential campaign ==
At the time of Hannon's hiring as campaign CTO, much commentary was made on the significance of a woman holding this position for the first time. The appointment was described as "helping open the door for other women in an industry that has long been a boys club." The theme of transcending traditional gender roles was recently the subject of a speech by Clinton to a Silicon Valley audience, stating her intent to "crack every last glass ceiling".
