= Robby Mook =

American political campaign strategist and campaign manager (born 1979)

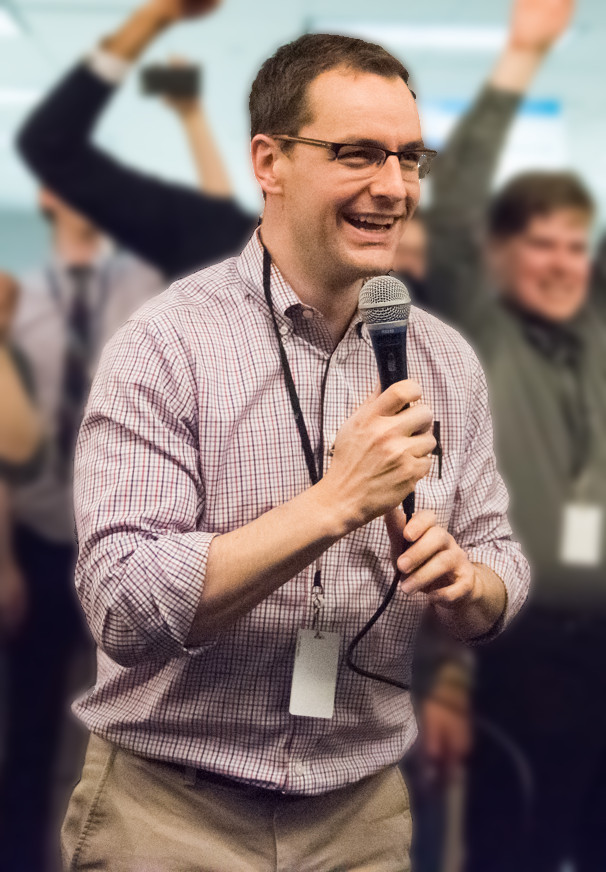
- Mook in 2016
- Born: December 3, 1979 (age 46); Sharon, Vermont, U.S.
- Education: Columbia University (BA)
- Political party: Democratic

Robert E. Mook (/mʊk/; born December 3, 1979) is an American former political strategist. He was the campaign manager for Hillary Clinton's 2016 presidential campaign.

Mook worked on state campaigns and on Howard Dean's 2004 presidential campaign. He then joined the Democratic National Committee and worked for Hillary Clinton's 2008 presidential campaign as a state director in three states.

Mook managed former Governor Jeanne Shaheen's campaign during the 2008 United States Senate election in New Hampshire, served as the executive director of the Democratic Congressional Campaign Committee in 2012, and was the campaign manager for Terry McAuliffe's successful 2013 gubernatorial campaign. Having not managed a campaign since 2016, his career in campaign management has effectively ended.

In the wake of the 2016 presidential election, Mook drew criticism for his campaign strategy, specifically his reliance on data analytics.

== Early life and education ==
Mook was born in Sharon, Vermont, the son of Kathryn and Delo Mook, and was raised in nearby Norwich, across the river from Hanover, New Hampshire. His father was a physics professor at Dartmouth College in Hanover, and his mother was a hospital administrator at Dartmouth–Hitchcock Medical Center, in nearby Lebanon, New Hampshire.

Mook attended Hanover High School, where Matt Dunne, a member of the Vermont House of Representatives, served as the theater director. Dunne met Mook when he auditioned for a school play, and Mook volunteered for Dunne's reelection campaign. Mook graduated from Columbia University in 2002 with a Bachelor of Arts in classics. At Columbia, he starred in the 108th Varsity Show, along with Michelle Collins, Brandon Victor Dixon, Lang Fisher, Peter Koechley, Will Graham, Gabe Liedman, and Jenny Slate. Mook also served in the United States Senate Page program.

== Career ==
=== Political campaigns ===
During the summer after Mook's freshman year at Columbia, Dunne hired Mook as the first paid staffer for the Vermont Democratic House Campaign, working to elect Democrats to the Vermont House. Mook worked as a field director during the 2002 Vermont gubernatorial election, which the Democrats lost. He served as deputy field director during Dean's 2004 presidential campaign in Wisconsin and New Hampshire. He joined the Democratic National Committee after Dean lost the nomination to John Kerry, serving as director of the get out the vote effort in Wisconsin during the general election. He worked for David W. Marsden, managing a campaign that won a previously Republican-held seat in the Virginia House of Delegates in 2005. In 2006, he coordinated the campaigns of Martin O'Malley, who defeated incumbent Bob Ehrlich in the Maryland gubernatorial election, and Ben Cardin, who defeated Michael Steele to win the United States Senate election.

=== Hillary Clinton 2008 presidential campaign ===
Mook joined Hillary Clinton's 2008 presidential campaign in 2007. He served as the campaign's state director for Nevada, Indiana, and Ohio. Clinton won the popular vote in all three states. Mook then managed Jeanne Shaheen's successful campaign for the United States Senate that fall. Mook joined the Democratic Congressional Campaign Committee (DCCC) in 2009 as their political director, and was named independent expenditure director of the DCCC in May 2010. After the 2010 House of Representatives elections, where the Democrats lost the majority, Mook was named executive director. In the 2012 House of Representatives elections, he aided the Democrats in gaining eight seats, though Democrats had aimed for the 25 seats needed to retake the majority.

=== Terry McAuliffe campaign ===
In 2013, Mook left the DCCC and was named the campaign manager of Terry McAuliffe's gubernatorial campaign. That year, Politico named Mook one of their "50 Politicos to Watch". Mook led McAuliffe's campaign to victory. He worked for McAuliffe's political action committee as well as the Virginia Progress PAC, helping in the reelection campaign of Senator Mark Warner in 2014.

=== Hillary Clinton 2016 presidential campaign ===
In January 2015, Clinton hired Mook and Joel Benenson as strategists. Upon the April 2015 announcement of Clinton's 2016 campaign for president, Mook was introduced as Clinton's campaign manager. According to The Washington Post, as Clinton's campaign manager, Mook won praise "both inside the campaign and among Clinton's vast circle of second-guessers, for the airtight and drama-free campaign he has built." A group of about 150 young political operatives close to Mook became known as the "Mook Mafia."

Mook played a key role in negotiating with Bernie Sanders' campaign to win his endorsement for Clinton. During the campaign, Donna Brazile commented on Mook's micro-tagging of voters based on purchasing preferences, alleging that it "missed the big picture". Clinton lost the election to Republican Donald Trump.

==== Aftermath ====
In the aftermath of the campaign, former staffers and political pundits criticized Mook for actions taken during the campaign. In particular, they faulted what they considered his excessive focus on data analytics.

In 2017, in response to Russia's interference in the 2016 presidential election, Mook, together with Matt Rhoades, started the "Defending Digital Democracy" initiative at the Belfer Center for Science and International Affairs at the Harvard Kennedy School.

In January 2017, Leading Authorities, a Washington, D.C.–based speaker's bureau, falsely announced that Mook had teamed with Trump campaign manager Corey Lewandowski to offer insights into the 2016 race. Mook and Lewandowski denied the allegation, and Mook fired the firm as a result.

During testimony given in May 2022 in the trial of Michael Sussmann, Mook testified that Clinton agreed to give a reporter information that connected Trump with Russian Alfa-Bank, even though her campaign was uncertain about whether the allegations were true.

=== House Majority PAC ===
In February 2019, Mook became president of House Majority PAC, a super PAC supporting Democrats in House of Representatives elections.

== Personal life ==
Mook was the first openly gay manager of a major presidential campaign. In September 2017, Mook was announced as the Harvard Institute of Politics 2017–2018 Visiting Fellow.
