= Joel Benenson =

American pollster and consultant

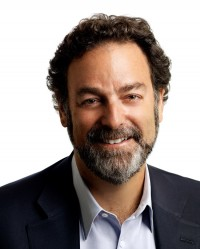
- Born: July 24, 1952 (age 74); New York City, New York, U.S.
- Education: Queens College, City University of New York
- Occupations: Pollster, political operative
- Political party: Democratic

Joel Benenson (born July 24, 1952) is an American pollster and consultant known for his role as a strategist for Barack Obama's 2008 and 2012 presidential campaigns. He was the chief strategist for Hillary Clinton's 2016 presidential campaign.

== Early life ==
Benenson was born in New York City to a Jewish family. He grew up in Laurelton, Queens and Manhattan with his family. He attended Andrew Jackson High School in the late 1960s. Benenson is a Queens College graduate.

== Career ==
He was the CEO of Benenson Strategy Group, a strategic consulting firm, and served as a communications and polling advisor to the White House for Barack Obama. He has been a strategist for U.S. senators, governors and mayors, as well as Fortune 500 companies. He was a pollster for the DCCC in 2006, when the Democrats won back the majority in the House of Representatives.

In 1995, he worked as a Political Journalist for the Daily News in New York and served as Communications Director for Governor Mario Cuomo’s 1994 campaign. He was previously a vice president at the New York ad agency FCB.

Benenson has served as a consultant to American companies and CEOs, including Procter & Gamble’s A.G. Lafley, General Electric’s Jack Welch and AOL’s Bob Pittman. He has helped corporate clients. He was a strategic researcher for Procter & Gamble's launch of Olestra, the fat substitute; he helped AOL manage its capacity crisis in the late 1990s and a New York City coalition block Mayor Michael Bloomberg’s plans for an Olympic stadium in Manhattan.

Benenson is also the co-founder of iModerate Research Technologies.

In January 2015, Hillary Clinton hired Benenson and Robby Mook as strategists.

The Israeli Blue and White political alliance appointed Benenson as its strategist for the September 2019 Israeli legislative election.
