= Hillary Clinton 2016 presidential campaign =

American political campaign

Hillary for America
- Campaign: 2016 Democratic primaries 2016 U.S. presidential election
- Candidate: Hillary Clinton; U.S. Secretary of State; (2009–2013); Tim Kaine; U.S. Senator from Virginia; (2013–present)
- Affiliation: Democratic Party
- Status: Announced: April 12, 2015; Official launch: June 13, 2015; Secured nomination: June 6, 2016; Official nominee: July 26, 2016; Election day: November 8, 2016; Lost election: November 9, 2016
- Headquarters: 1 Pierrepont Plaza; Brooklyn, New York
- Key people: John Podesta (chair); Huma Abedin (vice chair); Robby Mook (manager); Joel Benenson (chief strategist); Jim Margolis (media strategist); Jennifer Palmieri (communications director); Brian Fallon (press secretary); Stephanie Hannon (technology); Amanda Renteria (national political director); Marc Elias (general counsel); Nick Merrill (spokesperson); Dennis Cheng (national finance director)
- Receipts: US$585,699,061.27 (December 31, 2016)
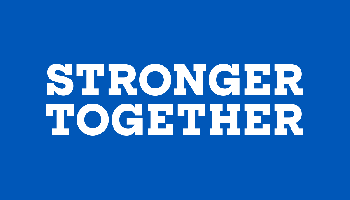
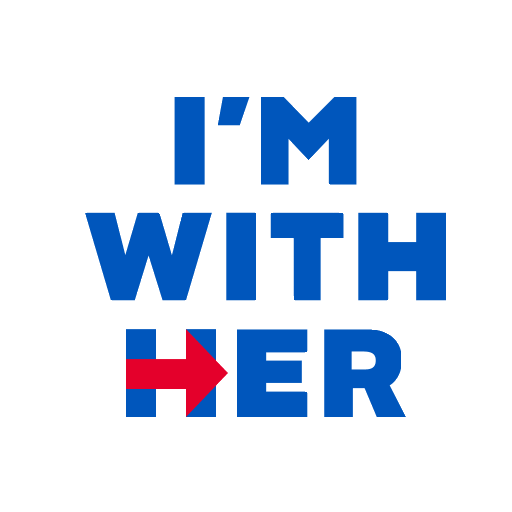
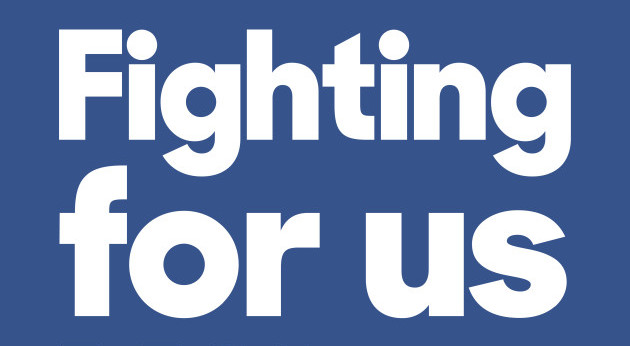
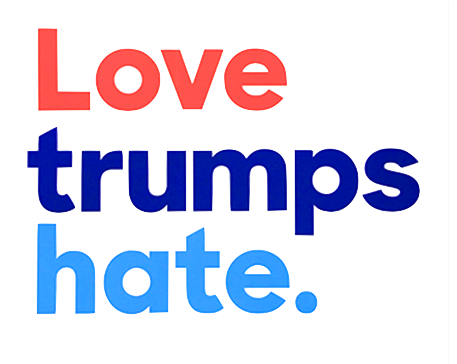
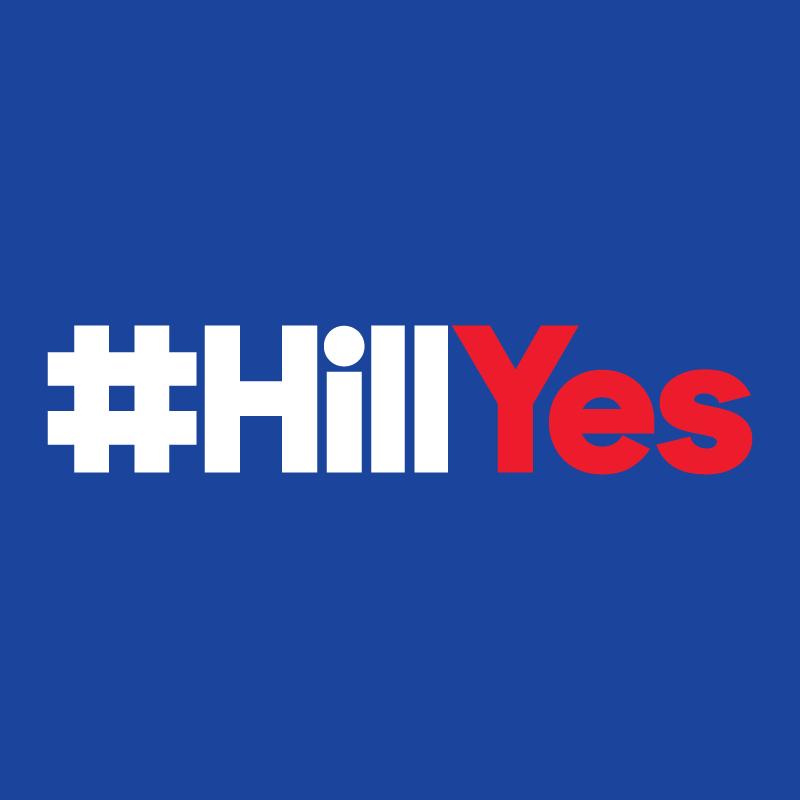
- Slogans: When they go low, we go high
- Theme song: "Fight Song" by Rachel Platten; "Roar" by Katy Perry; "Brave" by Sara Bareilles; "Stronger Together" by Jessica Sanchez; "Rise Up" by Andra Day

Website
- hillaryclinton.com (archived – July 31, 2016)

In 2016, Hillary Clinton ran unsuccessfully for president of the United States. Clinton ran as the Democratic Party's candidate for president, in which she became the first woman to win a presidential nomination by a major U.S. political party. Prior to running, Clinton served as the United States secretary of state in the administration of Barack Obama from 2009 to 2013, a U.S. senator representing New York from 2001 to 2009, and the first lady of the United States, as the wife of Bill Clinton, from 1993 to 2001. She was defeated in the general election by the Republican candidate, businessman Donald Trump.

Clinton announced her candidacy on April 12, 2015; her main competitor in the Democratic primaries was Vermont Senator Bernie Sanders, who ran as a more progressive candidate in the primary. Clinton became the presumptive nominee of the Democratic Party on June 6, 2016, having received the required number of delegates. On July 22, she announced Virginia Senator Tim Kaine as her running mate, and the two were formally nominated at the 2016 Democratic National Convention on July 26.

Clinton received the most support from middle aged and older voters, as well as from African-American, Latino, and older female voters. She focused her platform on several issues, including expanding racial, LGBTQ, and women's rights; raising wages and ensuring equal pay for women; and improving healthcare.

Clinton lost the general election to the Republican Party nominee, Donald Trump, on November 9, 2016; she conceded the following day, on November 10, 2016. Clinton's narrow, surprising losses in the blue wall states of Michigan, Pennsylvania, and Wisconsin were considered key to her defeat. These states all had swings from voters who had previously voted for Obama in 2008 and 2012 yet went for Trump in 2016. These states have largely relied on manufacturing and part of Trump’s campaign appeal was that he would end international trade agreements that hurt American manufacturing, he was outspoken on trade issues. Had Clinton been elected, she would have been the first female and first spouse of a president to serve as president of the United States.

== Background information ==
=== Post-2008 primary election campaign ===
As soon as Clinton ended her 2008 Democratic presidential primary election campaign and conceded to Barack Obama, there was talk of her running again in 2012 or 2016. After she ended her tenure as Secretary of State in 2013, speculation picked up sharply, particularly when she listed her occupation on social media as "TBD". In the meantime, Clinton earned over $11 million giving 51 paid speeches to various organizations, including Goldman Sachs and other Wall Street banks. The speeches, and Clinton's not releasing their transcripts, would be raised as an issue by her opponents during the upcoming primary and general election campaigns. In October 2016, leaked excerpts from a Goldman Sachs Q&A session cast doubts about her support for the 2010 Dodd–Frank financial oversight legislation.

Anticipating a future run, a "campaign-in-waiting" began to take shape in 2014, including a large donor network, experienced operatives, the Ready for Hillary and Priorities USA Action campaign political action committees (PACs), and other campaign infrastructure.

By September 2013, amid continual political and media speculation, Clinton said she was considering a run but was in no hurry to decide. In late 2013, Clinton told ABC's Barbara Walters that she would "look carefully at what I think I can do and make that decision sometime next year"; and told ABC's Diane Sawyer in June 2014 that she would "be on the way to making a decision before the end of the year."

=== Decision-making process ===
While many political analysts came to assume during this time that Clinton would run, she took a long time to make the decision. While Clinton said she spent much of the two years following her tenure, as Secretary of State, thinking about the possibility of running for president again, she was also noncommittal about the prospect, and appeared to some as reluctant to experience again the unpleasant aspects of a major political campaign. Those around her were split in their opinions, reportedly, with Bill Clinton said to be the most in favor of her running again, Chelsea Clinton leaning towards it, but several of her closest aides against it. She reportedly studied Obama's 2008 campaign to see what had gone right for Obama as compared to her own campaign. Not until December 2014, around the time of the Clintons' annual winter vacation in the Dominican Republic, did she say she decided for sure that she would indeed run again.

=== Expectations ===
According to nationwide opinion polls in early 2015, Clinton was considered the front-runner for the 2016 Democratic presidential nomination. She had gained a broader sweep of early endorsements from the Democratic Party establishment in the 2016 race than she did in 2008, although she did face several primary election challengers, and, in August 2015 Vice President Joe Biden was reported to be seriously considering a possible challenge to Clinton.

In 2015, Clinton's name recognition was estimated at 99% (only 11% of all voters said they did not know enough about her to form an opinion), and according to Democratic pollster Celinda Lake, she has had strong support from African-Americans, and among college-educated women and single women.

In Time magazine's 2015 list of "The 100 Most Influential People", Clinton praised Massachusetts Senator Elizabeth Warren, who herself was considered as a potential challenger to Clinton, for being a "progressive champion". Warren decided not to run for president, despite pressure from some progressives.

== Announcement ==
Clinton campaign logo during the primaries and prior to selection of Tim Kaine as running mate

The Clinton campaign had planned for a delayed announcement, possibly as late as July 2015.

On April 3, 2015, it was reported that Clinton had taken a lease on a small office at 1 Pierrepont Plaza in Brooklyn, New York City. It was widely speculated that the space would serve as her campaign headquarters.

On April 12, 2015, Clinton released a YouTube video formally announcing her candidacy via email. She stated that, "Everyday Americans need a champion. And I want to be that champion." The week following her announcement, she traveled to early primary states, such as Iowa and New Hampshire. Clinton was the third candidate with support in national polls to announce her candidacy, following Republican Senators Ted Cruz of Texas and Rand Paul of Kentucky, while Florida Senator Marco Rubio announced his candidacy on April 13, the day after Clinton. Some Democrats saw the proximity of Clinton's campaign announcement to Rubio's as advantageous, as Clinton's announcement might overshadow Rubio's.

Clinton's campaign logo was unveiled on April 12, 2015, featuring a blue H with a red arrow through the middle.

=== Van tour ===
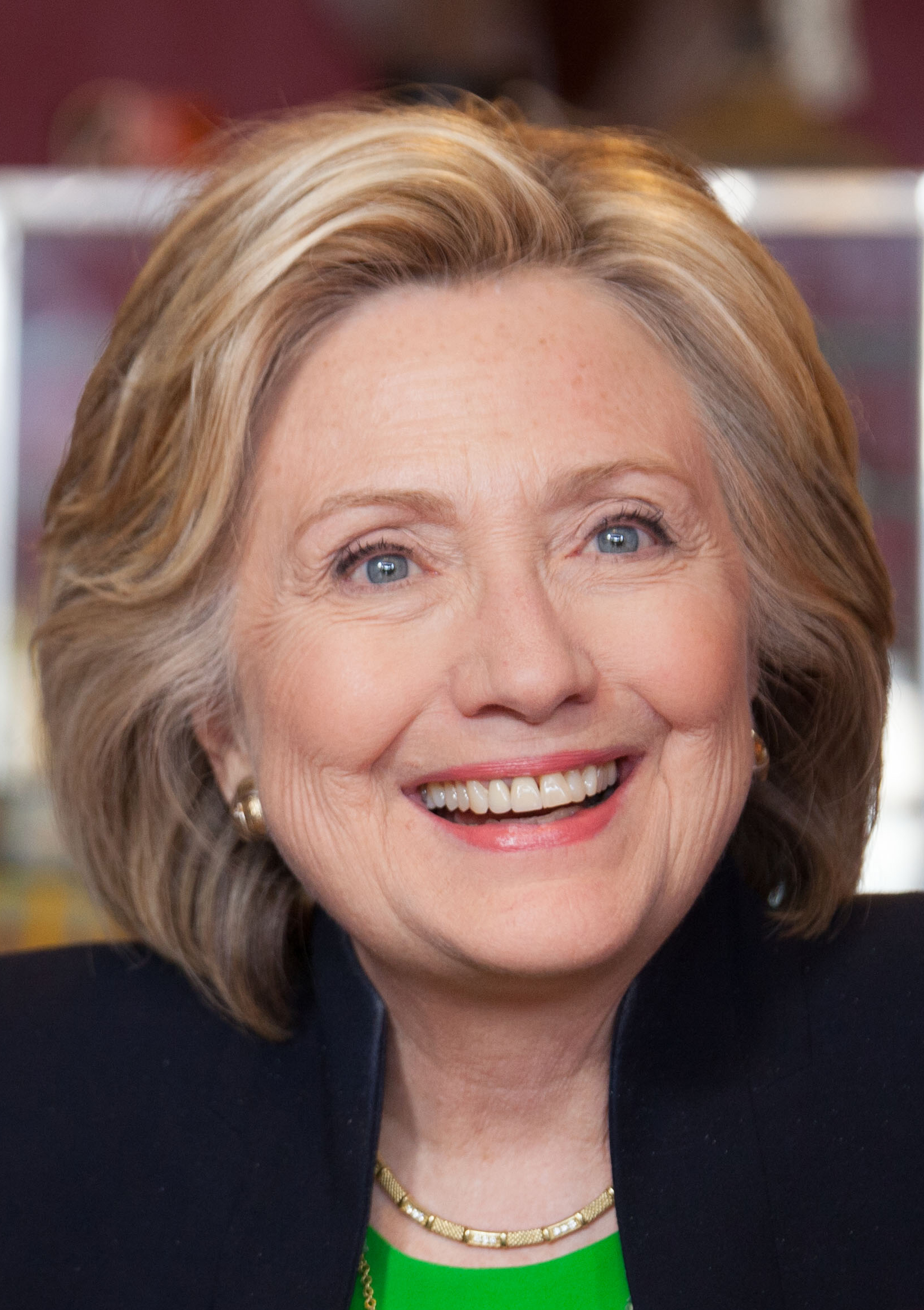
Hillary Clinton at an early campaign event in Iowa on April 14, 2015

Clinton began her campaign by making short trips to early primary and caucus states. Immediately following her announcement, she made a two-day road trip in a customized Chevrolet Express van, nicknamed after Scooby-Doo, going from New York to Iowa, and stopping several times along the way, including a much publicized stop at a Chipotle Mexican Grill outside Toledo, Ohio, where Clinton was not recognized by the staff. The trip gained considerable media attention and was, according to her campaign, intended as a bit of political theater.

Clinton responded to very few questions from the press during the first month of her campaign. During her visits to early primary and caucus states, she did not hold any formal press conferences, and did not participate in any media interviews. On May 19, 2015, after 28 days, Clinton answered some questions from reporters at an event in Cedar Rapids, Iowa. Clinton's campaign announced she would make additional stops in Florida, Texas, and Missouri in May and June.

=== Kickoff rally ===
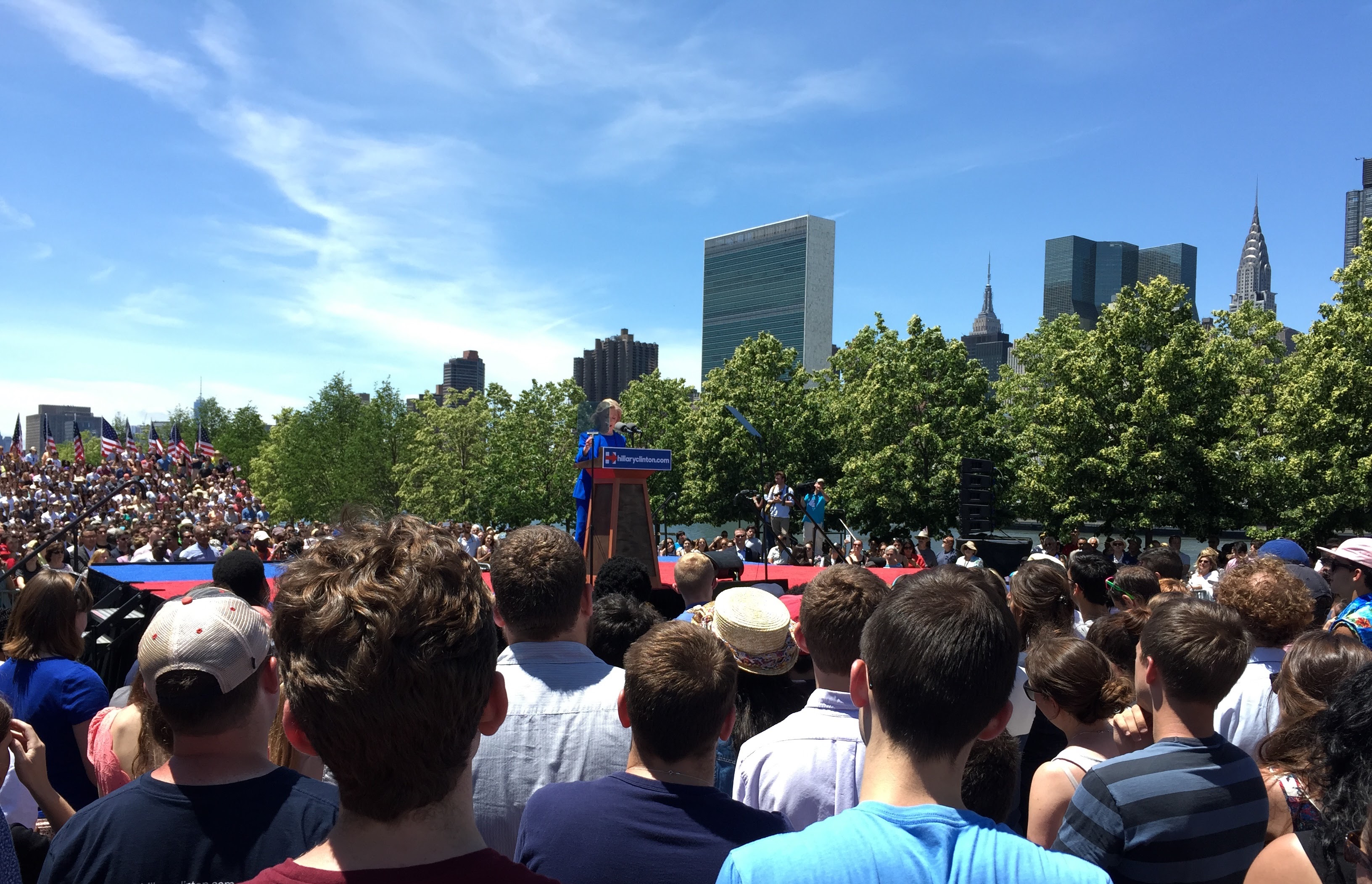
Clinton delivers the speech at her kickoff rally. The United Nations, Empire State Building, and Chrysler Building can be seen in the background.

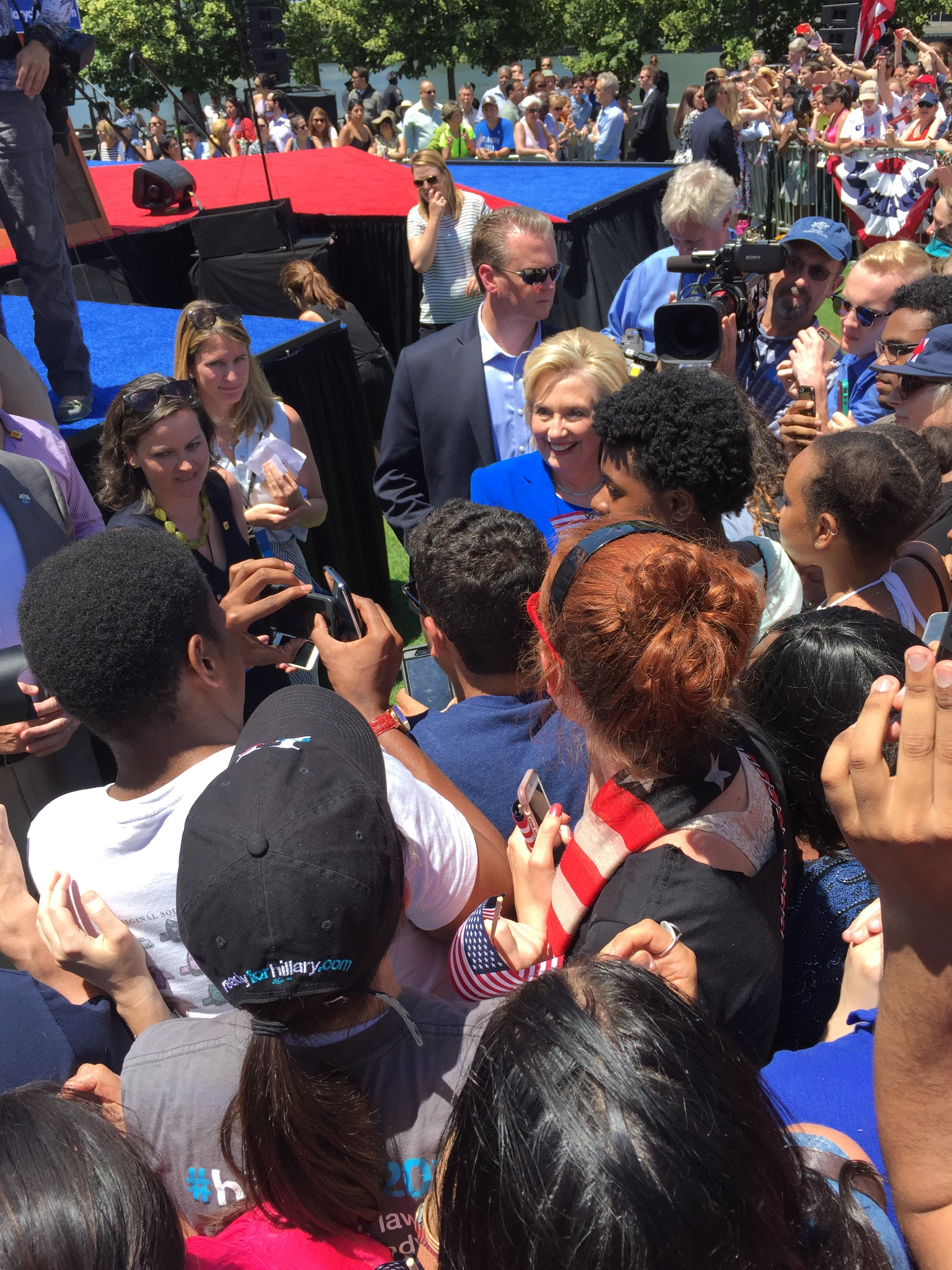
Clinton greets the crowd following her speech.

Clinton held her first major campaign rally on June 13, 2015, at Franklin D. Roosevelt Four Freedoms Park on the southern tip of New York City's Roosevelt Island.

In her speech, Clinton addressed income inequality in the United States, specifically endorsed universal pre-kindergarten, paid family leave, equal pay for women, college affordability, and incentives for companies that provide profit sharing to employees. She did not address free trade agreements during the kickoff speech, but made statements the next day suggesting that the current negotiations should be abandoned unless improved.

The campaign said more than 5,500 people were in attendance, but estimates of crowd size by the press in attendance were less.

According to John Cassidy, staff writer at The New Yorker, Clinton, up to a point, took a populist tone:

While many of you are working multiple jobs to make ends meet, you see the top twenty-five hedge-fund managers making more than all of America's kindergarten teachers combined. And often paying a lower tax rate. So, you have to wonder, 'When does my hard work pay off? When does my family get ahead? When?'

Prosperity can't be just for C.E.O.s and hedge-fund managers. Democracy can't be just for billionaires and corporations. Prosperity and democracy are part of your basic bargain, too. You brought our country back. Now it's time—your time—to secure the gains and move ahead.

On June 15, 2015, South Carolina Senator Clementa C. Pinckney, who had campaigned for Clinton earlier that day, was murdered along with eight others in the Charleston Church shooting. Clinton postponed campaign activities to join President Barack Obama, Vice President Joe Biden, and other dignitaries at Pinckney's funeral in Charleston on June 26, 2015.

=== Advertising ===
In August 2015, the Clinton campaign began a $2 million television advertising buy in Iowa and New Hampshire. The ads featured footage of Clinton's late mother, Dorothy Rodham, and of Clinton herself, and featured women, family, and children.

In a review of Clinton's 32 general election TV ads, the Associated Press found that 24 of those ads show or mention Trump. The majority of those 24 ads feature raw footage of him rather than others opining on his words and actions.

== Platform ==
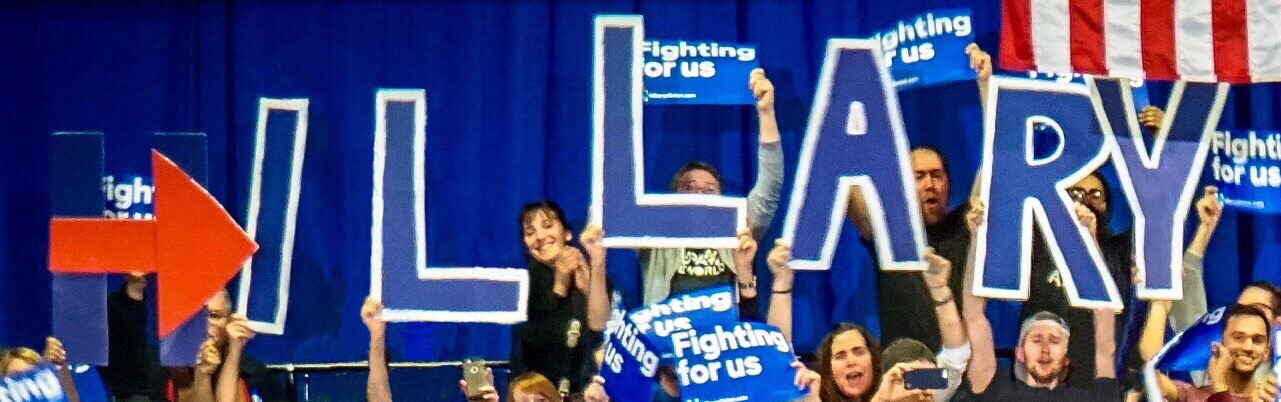
Supporters of Hillary Clinton raising a sign (its contents being spelled "Hillary" and with the "H" being composed of Clinton's logo)

Clinton focused her candidacy on several themes, including raising middle class incomes, expanding women's rights, instituting campaign finance reform, and improving the Affordable Care Act.

In March 2016, she laid out a detailed economic plan, which The New York Times called "optimistic" and "wide-ranging". Basing her economic philosophy on inclusive capitalism, Clinton proposed a "clawback" which would rescind tax relief and other benefits for companies that move jobs overseas; providing incentives for companies that share profits with employees, communities and the environment, rather than focusing on short-term profits to increase stock value and rewarding shareholders; increasing collective bargaining rights; and placing an "exit tax" on companies that move their headquarters out of America in order to pay a lower tax rate overseas. Clinton opposed the Trans-Pacific Partnership (TPP), supported the U.S. Export-Import Bank, and stated that "any trade deal has to produce jobs and raise wages and increase prosperity and protect our security".

Given the climate of unlimited campaign contributions following the Supreme Court's Citizens United decision, Clinton called for a constitutional amendment to limit "unaccountable money" in politics. In July 2016, she "committed" to introducing a U.S. constitutional amendment that would result in overturning the 2010 Citizens United decision.

On social issues, Clinton explicitly focused on family issues, particularly universal preschool. Clinton also prioritized closing the gender pay gap and reaffirmed that she believed that a right to same-sex marriage is protected by the U.S. constitution. Clinton stated that allowing undocumented immigrants to have a path to citizenship "[i]s at its heart a family issue."

Clinton expressed support for the Common Core educational initiative, saying, "The really unfortunate argument that's been going on around Common Core, it's very painful because the Common Core started off as a bipartisan effort. It was actually nonpartisan. It wasn't politicized.... Iowa has had a testing system based on a core curriculum for a really long time. And [speaking to Iowans] you see the value of it, you understand why that helps you organize your whole education system. And a lot of states unfortunately haven't had that, and so don't understand the value of a core, in this sense a Common Core."

In a December 7, 2015 The New York Times article, Clinton presented her detailed plans for regulating Wall Street financial activities by reining in the largest institutions to limit risky behavior, appointing strong regulators, and holding executives accountable.

Clinton supported maintaining American influence in the Middle East. She publicly opposed Trump's call to ban Muslims from the United States as "shameful" and "dangerous". She also claimed Trump's statement was "a reflection of much of the rest of his party", as "many GOP candidates have also said extreme things about Muslims". Clinton told the American Israel Public Affairs Committee, "America can't ever be neutral when it comes to Israel's security and survival."

== Strategy and tactics ==
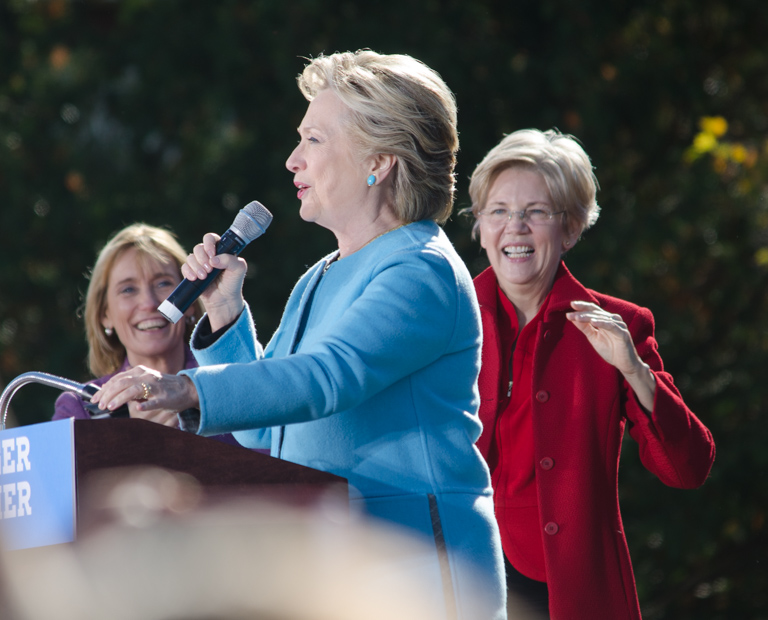
Clinton campaigning in Manchester, New Hampshire, in October 2016. New Hampshire Governor Maggie Hassan (left) and Massachusetts Senator Elizabeth Warren (right) in the background.

Clinton campaign strategists reportedly believed that a strong liberal campaign would mobilize the same voters who swept Barack Obama to victory in 2008 and 2012. Her strategy of embracing Obama's policies proved highly effective with African American Democratic voters in the South Carolina Democratic primary.

By March 2016 Clinton's nomination seemed likely, so efforts turned to structuring a campaign against Donald Trump, the presumptive Republican nominee, and determining how to generate enthusiasm for Clinton among the Democratic electorate, which had not turned out in large numbers for primaries.

Clinton began the campaign with near-universal name recognition among voters, having been First Lady, U.S. Senator, and Secretary of State.

=== Focus on local issues ===
When Clinton campaigned she identified local issues of interest to the Democratic voters of each state she visited. For example, in Mississippi, she expressed her concern about lead levels in the water in Jackson, the capital, where it was a major issue.

=== Emphasis on experience and steady leadership ===
Over the course of her campaign, Clinton emphasized her experience and record in public life, particularly as U.S. Secretary of State. Clinton also emphasized "the need for calm, steady, experienced leadership in the White House" in times of uncertainty, as well as the need to maintain the U.S.'s alliances across the Atlantic and the world.

=== Press relations ===
Clinton has had an uneasy, and at times adversarial relationship with the press throughout her life in public service. Weeks before her official entry as a presidential candidate, Clinton attended a political press corps event, pledging to start fresh on what she described as a "complicated" relationship with political reporters. Clinton was initially criticized by the press for avoiding taking their questions, after which she provided more interviews.

=== Technology ===
Clinton had access to the same technological tools that were used in Barack Obama's presidential campaign of 2012 and 2008. A team of over 50 engineers and developers previously with Google, Facebook, and Twitter was hired. The campaign used Timshel's The Groundwork platform for organizing data generated by mass e-mail programs, tracking donors, and analyzing marketing databases.

=== Ground game ===
In October 2016, the Clinton campaign had 489 field offices compared to Trump's 178. For context, Obama had 786 and some reports over 800 national field offices in 2012. Political science research suggests that there is a modest positive relationship between field offices and vote share.

== Fundraising ==
Throughout the general election campaign, Clinton consistently led Trump in fundraising. Through August 2016, Clinton, the Democratic National Committee and Clinton's main super PAC, Priorities USA Action, had raised more than $59.5 million, while Trump had brought in $41.7 million. According to a September 2016 analysis by the Center for Public Integrity, "More than 1,100 elite moneymen and women have collectively raised more than $113 million" for Clinton's campaign. These bundlers, who collected checks from friends or associates and gave them to the campaign, included "lawmakers, entertainment icons and titans of industry"; among them were Ben Affleck, George Lucas, Marissa Mayer, and Sheryl Sandberg.

According to an article in The Washington Post, Clinton's presidential campaign benefited from a network of donors whom she and her husband, former President Bill Clinton, had "methodically cultivated... over 40 years, from Little Rock to Washington and then across the globe. Their fundraising methods have created a new blueprint for politicians and their donors." By the end of September 2015, the campaign's fundraising effort for "Clinton's 2016 White House run ... has already drawn $110 million in support".

In response to the article, a campaign spokesman said that "it would be misleading, at best, to conflate donations to a philanthropy with political giving. ... And regarding the campaign contributions, the breadth and depth of their support is a testament to the fact that they have both dedicated their lives to public service and fighting to make this country stronger." As the Post article pointed out, fundraising for the 2016 presidential campaign existed "in a dramatically different environment" than in the past, and the 2010 Citizens United v. FEC decision and ruling by "the Supreme Court has made it easier for wealthy individuals, corporations and unions to spend huge, unregulated sums on political activity".

In August 2015, the Clinton campaign announced that it had signed a joint fundraising agreement with the Democratic National Committee. The campaign set up a joint fundraising committee with the DNC, the Hillary Victory Fund, and 32 state committees. The Clinton campaign sent the DNC a memorandum of understanding in which the campaign agreed to help the DNC pay off debt in exchange for "joint authority over strategic decisions over the staffing, budget, expenditures, and general election related communications, data, technology, analytics, and research". The memo specified that these arrangements would be limited to "preparations for the General Election and not the Democratic Primary".

In the debate between Sanders and Clinton in New Hampshire prior to the New Hampshire primary Clinton, objecting to the inference that campaign contributions or speaking fees from the financial sector would influence her political decisions, characterized Sanders' references to her Wall Street connections as a "'very artful smear' campaign". He responded by saying, "It's a fact. When in the last reporting period her super PAC received $25 million and $15 million came from Wall Street, what is the smear? That is the fact."

The Clinton campaign entered September 2016 with $121.4 million in the bank, while the Trump campaign had $96 million.

=== Super PACs supporting Clinton ===
In May 2015, it was reported that the Clinton campaign lagged behind opposing Republican campaigns in gaining large donations from wealthy donors to supportive Super PACs. At that time, many potential liberal, big-money donors had not yet committed to support Clinton. Clinton's super PAC fundraising picked up significantly in the general election. Priorities USA Action, the main super PAC supporting Clinton, raised $23.4 million in August 2016. More than half of that amount came from its top five donors, and the amount included 11 seven-figure checks.

Super PACs that have supported Clinton include:

- Ready PAC, formerly Ready for Hillary, was founded by Clinton supporters in January 2013. It raised money and signed up supporters in expectation of her presidential bid. Ready PAC wound down operations in April 2015, handing over its 4-million person email list to the Clinton campaign.
- Priorities USA Action is the main super PAC supporting Clinton's candidacy. It is focused mainly on high-dollar donors. As of September 2016, it had amassed $132 million. The top six donors to the super PAC have given $43.5 million, which is a third of the money collected by Priorities USA Action. Top contributors include George Soros, Haim Saban and Thomas Tull. Other major donors include Steven Spielberg and Jeffrey Katzenberg. Following Clinton's loss in the New Hampshire primary, Priorities USA Action committed $500,000 to a radio campaign in South Carolina and $4.5 million to Super Tuesday primaries. As of late January 2016, the fund had $45 million. The super PAC raised $21.7 million in August 2016, marking its largest monthly fundraising haul.
- Correct the Record, which started as a campaign of American Bridge 21st Century, spun off as a separate super PAC in May 2015. Though super PACs are typically prohibited from coordinating with campaigns, Correct the Record coordinates with the Clinton campaign on digital content. A spokeswoman for the super PAC said "the coordination restriction would not apply because Correct the Record's defense of Mrs. Clinton would be built around material posted on the group's own website, not paid media." In April 2016, Correct the Record announced it would spend $1 million to find and confront social media users who post unflattering messages about Clinton. In September 2016, Correct the Record announced a project called "Trump Leaks." Correct the Record says it would pay anonymous tipsters for unflattering scoops about Donald Trump, including audio and video recordings and internal documents.

== People ==
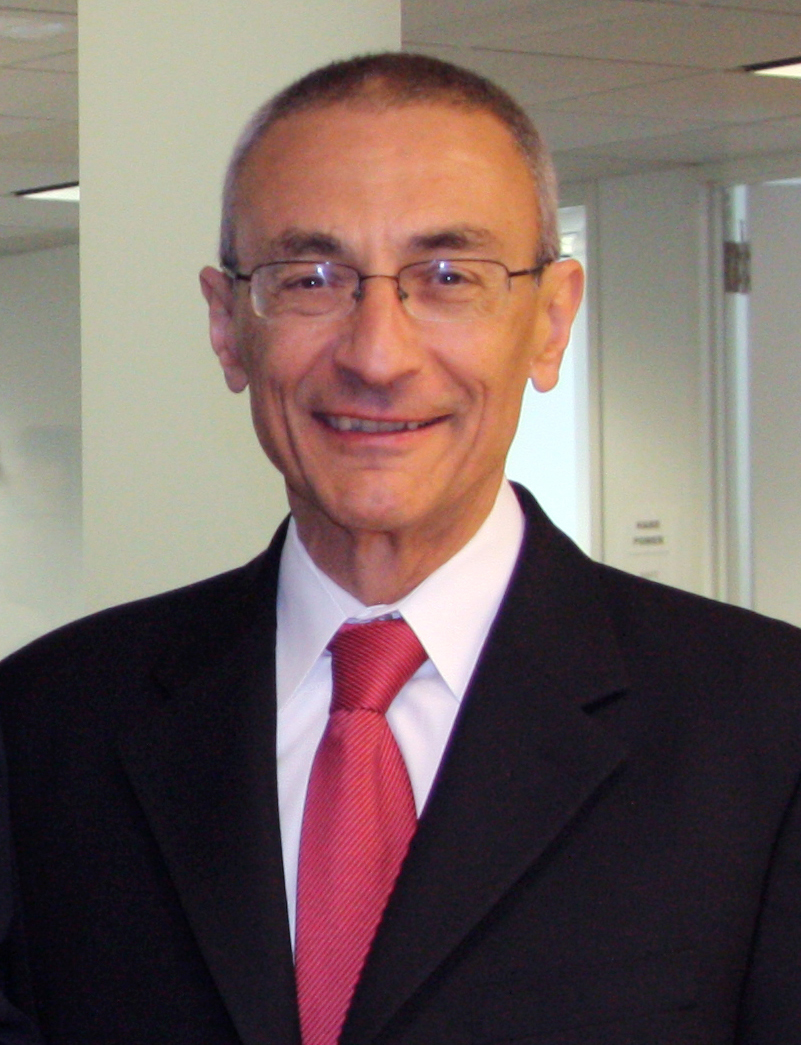
John Podesta, Campaign Chairman

=== Campaign staff ===
Robby Mook served as campaign manager, and is the first openly gay person to serve in that role in a major presidential campaign.

Stephanie Hannon served as chief technology officer, and is the first woman to serve in that role in a major presidential campaign.

Other campaign staff included John Podesta as campaign chairman, Joel Benenson as chief strategist and pollster, Jennifer Palmieri as communications director, and Amanda Renteria as political director. Longtime Clinton aide Huma Abedin was the vice chairwoman of the campaign, and continued in the role she has long played for Clinton as traveling chief of staff and "body woman". Fundraising was led by Dennis Cheng as national finance director for the campaign, and main liaison between many major donors and Clinton. Future New York State Senator Alessandra Biaggi served as Deputy National Operations Director, and said: "Everything was urgent in the moment. It was total chaos and I loved it. We played very hard, and it was very hard to lose." Zara Rahim served as a national spokeswoman for the campaign.

=== Policy advisors ===
Clinton named three senior policy advisers to lead policy development for her presidential campaign: Maya Harris, Ann O'Leary, and Jake Sullivan. Michael Schmidt, Michael Shapiro and Jacob Leibenluft were on Clinton's policy team, while Sullivan, a longtime Clinton staffer, served as policy director.

The Clinton campaign had a large set of outside policy advisors who served on advisory groups.

==== Defense and foreign policy ====
Senior advisors included former CIA Director and Secretary of Defense Leon Panetta, former National Security Advisor Tom Donilon, Center for a New American Security CEO Michèle Flournoy, former Secretary of State Madeleine Albright, and others. The campaign also had a decentralized system of "about a dozen advisory working groups for regional and functional issues" such as Asia, Europe, counter-terrorism, and human rights. Foreign Policy magazine reported that "the campaign boasts a surprisingly diverse cadre of experts, from early-career think tankers in their 20s to graying ex-diplomats in their 50s and 60s".

Clinton's campaign emphasized continuity with the foreign policy of the Obama administration, including support for NATO and established international alliances. She also advocated for maintaining a strong U.S. leadership role globally, with a focus on counterterrorism and international security.

==== Economic and domestic policy ====
On economic policy, outside advisors with whom Clinton regularly consulted included Gene Sperling, former director of the National Economic Council; Neera Tanden of the Center for American Progress; Ann O'Leary; economists Alan Krueger and Alan Blinder; Nobel laureate economist Joseph Stiglitz; Jared Bernstein, the former chief economist to Joe Biden; and Heather Boushey.

On August 16, 2016, Clinton named Ken Salazar to lead her White House transition team.

=== Communications, advertising, and design firms ===
Two of the Clinton campaigns' top media buying agencies were GMMB (which focused on television) and Bully Pulpit Interactive (which focused on digital). The Clinton campaign's analytics director was Elan Kriegel, the co-founder of BlueLabs, a Democratic data firm. The campaign has also hired Burrell Communications, an African American advertising firm.

Graphic designer Michael Bierut of the firm Pentagram designed the campaign's distinctive "H" logo; Bierut volunteered his services. Bierut later recommended designer Jennifer Kinon to lead the in-house design team and design a comprehensive visual identity for the campaign.

Professionals in branding and marketing, such as Wendy Clark of Coca-Cola, and Roy Spence of GSD&M, were brought into the campaign to assist with "re-branding" Clinton.

== Caucuses and primaries ==
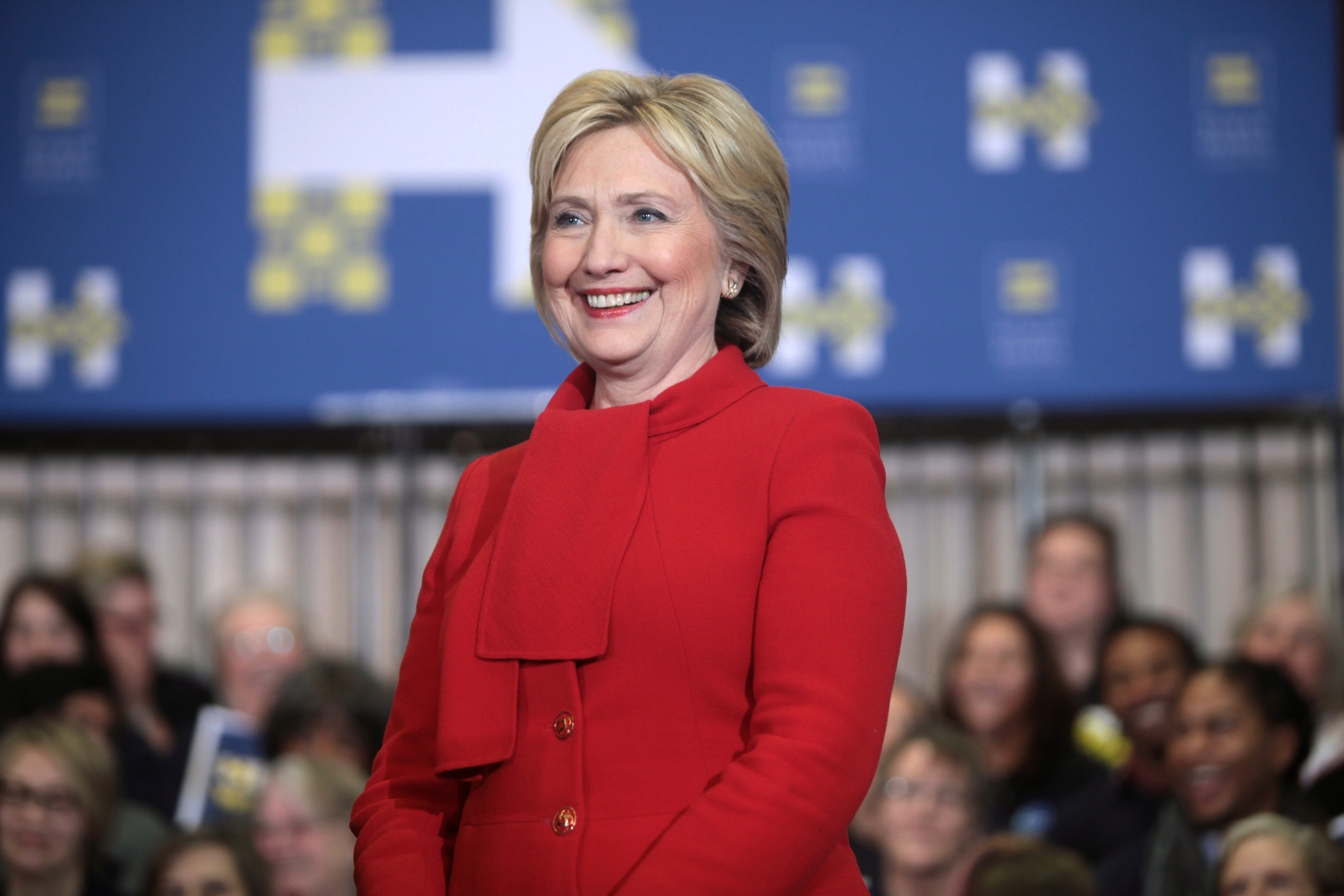
Hillary Clinton at an event in West Des Moines, Iowa in January 2016

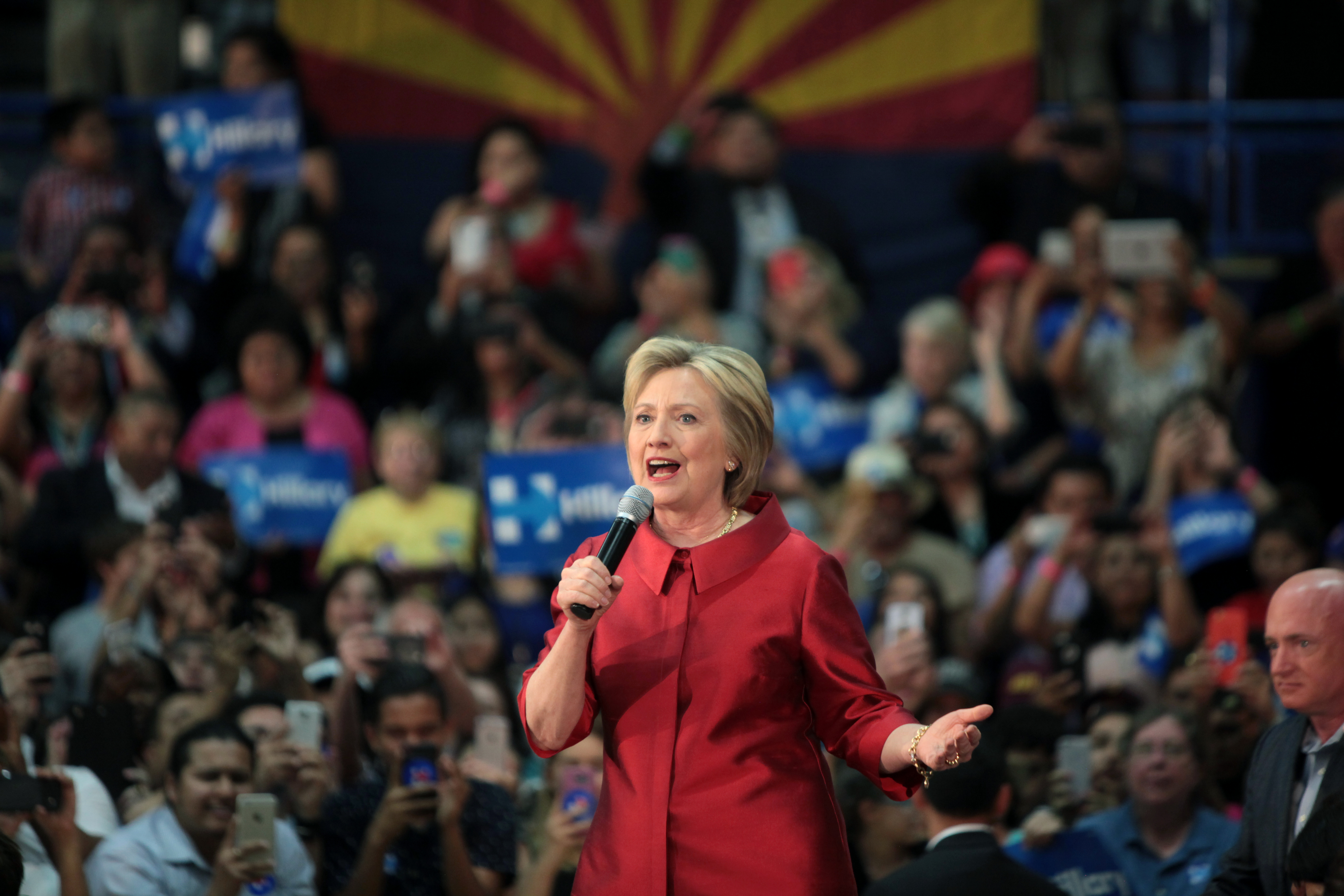
Hillary Clinton at an event in Phoenix, Arizona in March 2016

Clinton's state-by-state performance in the primaries: Hillary Clinton Bernie Sanders

County-by-county results: Hillary Clinton Bernie Sanders

Percentage of vote received by Clinton by state or territory in the primaries: 10.0–19.9% 20.0–29.9% 30.0–39.9% 40.0–49.9% 50.0–59.9% 60.0–69.9% 70.0–79.9% 80.0%+

Clinton won Iowa by the closest margin in the history of the state's Democratic caucus. Maryland Governor Martin O'Malley suspended (Note: In US elections, suspending a campaign allows candidates to cease active campaigning while still legally raising funds to pay off their debts.) his campaign after a distant third-place finish, leaving Clinton and Sanders the only two candidates. The electoral battle turned out to be more competitive than expected, with Sanders winning the New Hampshire primary while Clinton scored victories in the Nevada caucuses and South Carolina primary. On four different Super Tuesdays, Clinton secured numerous important wins in each of the nine most populous states including California, New York, Florida, and Texas, while Sanders scored various victories in between.

On June 6, 2016, the Associated Press and NBC News stated that Clinton had become the presumptive nominee after reaching the required number of delegates, including both pledged and unpledged delegates (superdelegates), to secure the nomination. In doing so, she had become the first woman to ever be the presumptive nominee of any major political party in the United States. On June 7, Clinton officially secured a majority of pledged delegates after winning in the California and New Jersey primaries. President Barack Obama, Vice President Joe Biden and Senator Elizabeth Warren formally endorsed Clinton on June 9, 2016. Sanders confirmed on June 24 that he would vote for Clinton over Donald Trump in the general election and, on July 12, 2016, formally endorsed Clinton in Portsmouth, New Hampshire.

On July 26, 2016, the Democratic National Convention officially nominated Clinton for president and Virginia Senator Tim Kaine for vice president. Clinton is the first woman in U.S. history to run for president as the nominee of a major political party.

=== Delegate count ===
The table below reflects the presumed delegate count following the 2016 Democratic primaries:

Candidate	Pledged delegates	Presumed count, including superdelegates
Hillary Clinton	2,205	2,775½
Bernie Sanders	1,846	1,889½
Martin O'Malley	0	1
Available delegates	0	97
Total delegate votes	4,051	4,763

== Presidential debates ==
The first presidential debate in 2016 took place between Clinton and Trump on September 26 at Hofstra University. This made Clinton the first woman to debate as part of an American presidential debate. The moderator was Lester Holt of NBC. A live-TV audience of 84 million viewers set a viewership record for presidential debates. All scientific polls showed that voters thought Hillary Clinton performed better than Donald Trump in the debate.

The second presidential debate in 2016 took place between Clinton and Trump on October 9 at Washington University in St. Louis. It was a town hall debate.

The third and last presidential debate between Clinton and Trump took place on October 19 at the University of Nevada, Las Vegas.

== Health ==
In July 2015, Clinton became the first 2016 presidential candidate to publicly release a medical history. The Clinton campaign released a letter from her physician, Lisa Bardack of Mount Kisco, New York, attesting to her good health based on a full medical evaluation. The letter noted that there was a "complete resolution" of a brain concussion that Clinton suffered in 2012 and "total dissolution" of prior blood clots. Bardack concluded that Clinton had no serious health issues that would interfere with her fitness to serve as president. Despite this letter, rumors and conspiracy theories concerning Clinton's health proliferated online. In August 2016, Trump questioned Hillary's stamina and Fox News host Sean Hannity called for Clinton to release her medical records, fueling these theories.

The US intelligence community noted that Clinton had health issues by August 27, 2016. In September 2016, Clinton developed pneumonia. She left a 9/11 commemoration ceremony early due to illness. Video footage of Clinton's departure showed Clinton becoming unsteady on her feet and being helped into a van; this footage went viral. Later that evening, Clinton reassured reporters that she was "feeling great". The Clinton campaign initially stated that Clinton had become overheated at the event; later on September 11, the campaign acknowledged that she had been diagnosed with pneumonia two days earlier. Clinton spent three days recovering at home, canceling several campaign events, before returning to the campaign trail at a rally at the University of North Carolina at Greensboro.

Following the 9/11 event, the Clinton campaign was criticized by some media outlets for a lack of transparency concerning Clinton's health. A subsequent poll found that 46% of respondents did not believe the campaign's disclosure that Clinton was suffering from pneumonia. Responding to concerns about transparency, Clinton released supplementary health records from Dr. Bardack, who found that she had had a non-contagious bacterial pneumonia infection and that she had recovered well with antibiotics and rest. Bardack wrote that she was "fit to serve as president of the United States."

== Controversies ==
=== Email controversy ===
In March 2015, Clinton's practice of using her own private email address and server during her time as Secretary of State, in lieu of State Department servers, attracted widespread public attention. Concerns were raised about security and preservation of emails, and the possibility that laws may have been violated. Nearly 2,100 emails contained in Clinton's server were determined to be classified when the state department had an opportunity to review them. According to Clinton they were not marked classified at the time she handled them. 65 emails were found to contain information classified as "Secret", more than 20 contained "Top-Secret" information, and the rest contained "Confidential" information. Government policy, reiterated in the nondisclosure agreement signed by Clinton as part of gaining her security clearance, is that sensitive information should be considered and handled as classified even if not marked as such. After allegations were raised that some of the emails in question fell into this "born classified" category, an FBI probe was initiated regarding how classified information was handled on the Clinton server.

The FBI probe was concluded on July 5, 2016, with a recommendation of no charges, a recommendation that was followed by the Justice Department. On October 28, 11 days before the election, FBI Director James Comey informed Congress that the FBI was analyzing additional emails obtained during its investigation of the unrelated matter of former New York Representative Anthony Weiner sexting an underage girl. On November 6, he notified Congress that the new emails did not change the FBI's earlier conclusion. The next day, stock and currency markets around the world surged in response. Clinton, speaking to major donors after her loss and citing campaign data, claimed that the effect of the two letters Comey released days before the election contributed to her defeat.

=== Benghazi hearings ===
On October 22, 2015, Clinton testified for a second time before the Benghazi Committee and answered members' questions for more than eight hours in a public hearing. The New York Times reported that "the long day of often-testy exchanges between committee members and their prominent witness revealed little new information about an episode that has been the subject of seven previous investigations...Perhaps stung by recent admissions that the pursuit of Mrs. Clinton's emails was politically motivated, Republican lawmakers on the panel for the most part avoided any mention of her use of a private email server." The email issue did arise shortly before lunch, in a "shouting match" between Republican committee chair Trey Gowdy and two Democrats, Adam Schiff and Elijah Cummings. Late in the hearing, Representative Jim Jordan, Republican of Ohio, accused Clinton of changing her accounts of the email service, leading to a "heated exchange" in which Clinton "repeated that she had made a mistake in using a private email account, but maintained that she had never sent or received anything marked classified and had sought to be transparent by publicly releasing her emails," a claim that was later contradicted by James Comey.

According to The Hill, the hearings provided a positive momentum for Clinton's 2016 campaign, with her performance generating headlines such as "Marathon Benghazi hearing leaves Hillary Clinton largely unscathed" (CNN), and "GOP lands no solid punches while sparring with Clinton over Benghazi" (The Washington Post). Her campaign received a windfall of donations, mostly coming from new donors.

=== WikiLeaks ===
During the week of the Democratic National Convention, WikiLeaks released emails suggesting that the Clinton campaign and the Democratic National Committee tilted the primary in favor of Clinton. In an excerpt of Donna Brazile's book, Hacks: The Inside Story, published in Politico magazine, Brazile wrote that she had found an unethical agreement between the Clinton campaign and the DNC which had allowed Clinton to exert "control of the party long before she became its nominee." In an interview on ABC's This Week on November 5, 2017, Brazile said that she had found no evidence of the Democratic primaries having been rigged in favor of Clinton.

=== Burns Strider ===
During the 2016 election, Correct the Record, a pro-Clinton political action committee, suspended former Clinton advisor Burns Strider over sexual harassment allegations. Clinton was criticized when it was discovered that she was aware of sexual harassment allegations against Strider when he worked on her 2008 presidential campaign years earlier and against the advice of her staff refused remove him from her campaign.

=== Basket of deplorables ===
On August 25, 2016, Clinton gave a speech criticizing Trump's campaign for using "racist lies" and allowing the alt-right to gain prominence. At a fundraiser on September 9, Clinton stated: "You know, just to be grossly generalistic, you could put half of Trump's supporters into what I call the basket of deplorables. They're racist, sexist, homophobic, xenophobic, Islamophobic — you name it." Trump criticized Clinton's remark as insulting to his supporters, and some political analysts compared the statement to Mitt Romney's 47% gaffe in 2012. The following day Clinton expressed regret for saying "half", while insisting that Trump had deplorably amplified "hateful views and voices".

The "Deplorables" nickname was adopted by some Trump supporters, with the Trump campaign inviting "deplorable Americans" on stage and using the label against Clinton in an advertisement.

=== Trump-Russia opposition research ===
In May 2022, Clinton's former campaign manager Robby Mook testified that Clinton had approved a plan to provide information to the media alleging activity between computer servers belonging to the Russian bank Alfa-Bank and the Trump Organization, on or about October 30, 2016. The alleged Alfa-Bank connection was later discredited.

In March 2022, the Federal Election Commission fined the Clinton campaign $8,000 and the Democratic National Committee $105,000 for misreporting over $1 million in payments to the law firm Perkins Coie as "legal services." The payments funded opposition research by Fusion GPS that produced the Steele dossier.

== Demographics and interest groups ==
=== Women ===
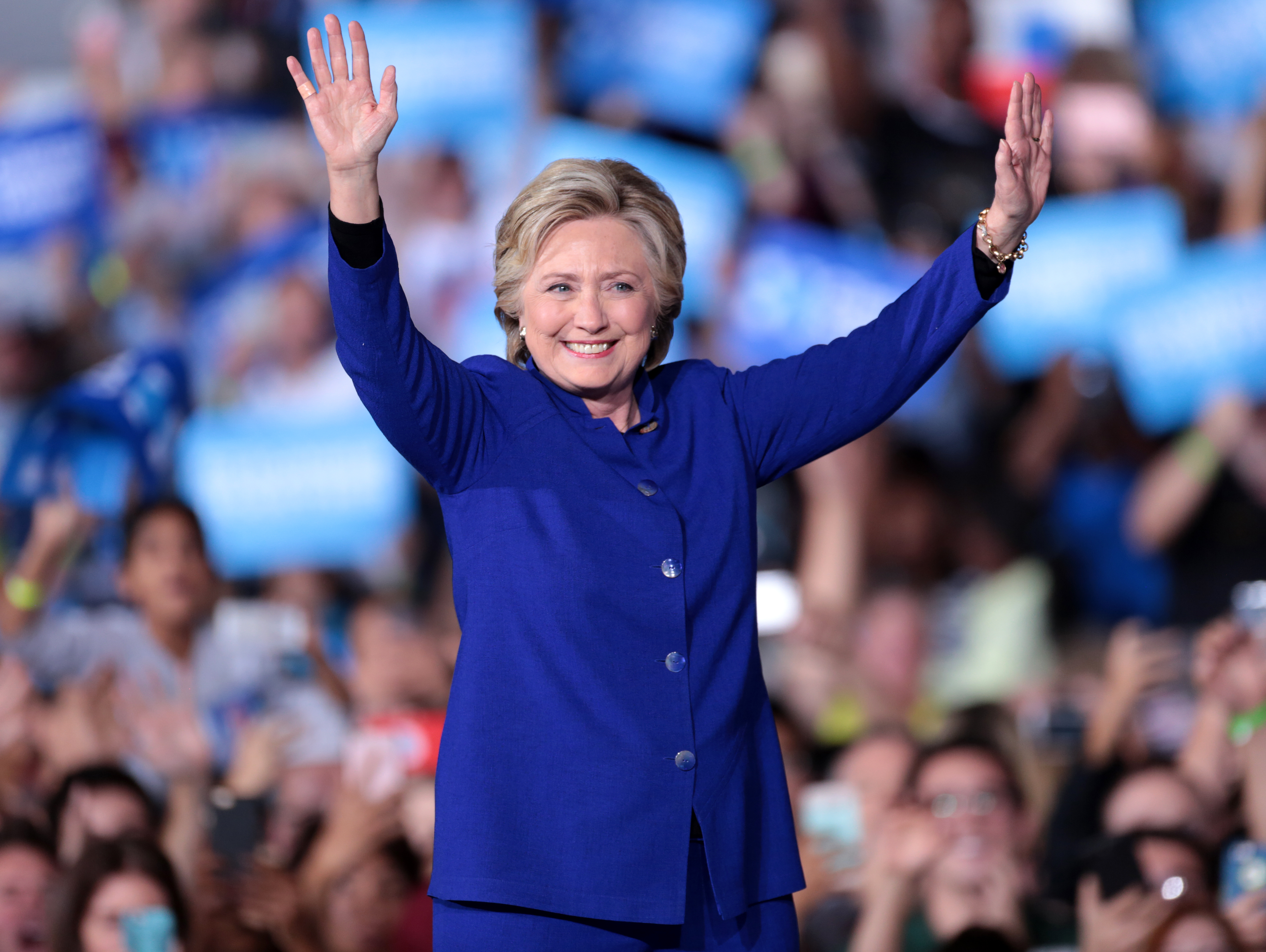
Clinton campaigning on November 2, 2016

In national polling, Clinton enjoyed "the highest level of female support of any candidate in more than four decades," with a 24-point lead in among female registered voters in a Pew Research Center taken on the eve of the 2016 Democratic National Convention. The same polling also showed a 16-percentage point difference in support among women and men, a historically unprecedented gender gap. Supporters created a private, online group, Pantsuit Nation, to share images in support of the candidate and her campaign. Its 2.9 million members used Clinton's typical choice of business wear—the pantsuit—as a symbol of both the candidate and the historical fight for women's equality.

=== African-American community ===
Clinton enjoyed the overwhelming support of African American voters in the Democratic primary elections. Overall, 77 percent of Black Democratic primary voters supported Clinton. Clinton performed especially well among Black women voters. There was a very large age gap among Black voters, with the majority of younger Black voters (under age 30) favoring Sanders but the overwhelming majority of older Black voters favoring Clinton.

In general election polling, Clinton continued to enjoy an overwhelming advantage among Black voters. Nationwide polling in the summer months of 2016 showed Clinton with the support of between 83% and 91% of Black voters. A key aim of the Clinton campaign was to ensure high voter turnout for African American voters; with President Barack Obama making a personal appeal to Black citizens to cast a ballot in the election. Younger Black voters were of particular concern to the Clinton campaign, because this demographic was more skeptical of Clinton than their elders.

Clinton has advocated criminal justice reform as well as support for African-American youth. However, critics have brought up her quote as First Lady regarding the Violent Crime Control and Law Enforcement Act, in which she described young, impoverished black children who had to turn to crime: "They are often the kinds of kids that are called 'super-predators.' No conscience, no empathy. We can talk about why they ended up that way, but first we have to bring them to heel." These remarks were used by Bernie Sanders and Donald Trump to imply racism on Clinton's behalf.

=== LGBT community ===
Alternate version of Clinton's 2016 campaign logo in rainbow colors, used on Twitter and on Facebook by the campaign, after release of the candidate's April 28, 2015, statement on same-sex marriage

Clinton made LGBT rights a central issue in her campaign. In addition to promoting broader LGBT rights, she also advocated for the right for transgender people to serve in the military. In the few years prior to the campaign, her public position on same sex marriage and "Don't ask, don't tell" (a Bill Clinton-era law preventing openly LGB people from serving in the military) had changed, although she expressed no regret over her previous views.

Clinton's stance on LGBT rights, like many Democrats, had shifted over time with public opinion. As First Lady and a Senator, she had opposed same-sex marriage, "favoring arrangements like civil unions", a position which "largely tracked public opinion" of the time. In 2004, she had opposed a proposed constitutional amendment to ban same-sex marriage, and in 2006 she said she would not oppose an effort by New York State officials to legalize same-sex marriage. In March 2013, she formally stated her support for same-sex marriage after stepping down as Secretary of State, stating she supported it "personally and as a matter of policy and law." In 2016, her Twitter account stated conversion therapy for minors should be ended.

Clinton condemned Indiana's Religious Freedom Restoration Act. She supported the Obergefell v. Hodges ruling. She also endorsed the Equality Act of 2015.

In December 2015, Clinton published a plan for LGBT rights. The next month, the Human Rights Campaign endorsed her for president. She criticized Bernie Sanders for calling the Human Rights Campaign "part of the establishment."

In March 2016, in an interview with MSNBC at Nancy Reagan's funeral service, Clinton credited Reagan with starting the national conversation about AIDS. Clinton's comments drew heavy criticism from LGBT groups and the media, who said that the Reagans had ignored the issue, causing Clinton to apologize and retract her statement.

In October 2016, Clinton became the first major-party presidential candidate ever to write an op-ed for an LGBT newspaper, writing for Philadelphia Gay News.

== Endorsements ==
Clinton was endorsed by The New York Times, The Washington Post, Los Angeles Times, Houston Chronicle, The Cincinnati Enquirer, The Dallas Morning News, and The Arizona Republic, editorial boards. The Houston Chronicle traditionally endorses Republicans later in the election, but chose to endorse Clinton in July. The Dallas Morning News had not endorsed a Democrat for president since 1940. The Cincinnati Enquirer had not endorsed a Democratic presidential candidate for almost 100 years. The Arizona Republic, which began publishing in 1890, had never endorsed a Democratic candidate.

USA Today, which had never endorsed a presidential candidate, broke the tradition and took sides in the race with an editorial which declared Trump as "erratic", describing his business career as "checkered", calling him a "serial liar" and "unfit for the presidency". The newspaper, however, said the "editorial does not represent unqualified support for Hillary Clinton." The Atlantic, which had only made two presidential endorsements in its 160-year history, endorsed Clinton.

A group of 70 Nobel laureates endorsed Clinton in an open letter released in October 2016. Among the signatories to the letter were chemist Peter Agre, economist Robert J. Shiller, and physicist Robert Woodrow Wilson.

== Transition planning ==
A presidential transition was contingently planned from Obama to Clinton in accordance with the Pre-Election Presidential Transition Act of 2010 and the Presidential Transitions Improvements Act of 2015 to occur in the event Clinton was elected president. It would have been a "friendly takeover", in which the outgoing president and the incoming president are of the same political party. Since Clinton lost the 2016 election to Republican presidential nominee Donald Trump, this transition never went into effect.

=== Developments ===
In April 2016, representatives of candidates Clinton, Trump, Sanders, John Kasich, and Ted Cruz jointly met with Obama administration officials to discuss the November presidential transition.

On June 3, 2016, the Agency Transition Directors Council first assembled at the White House to review transition plans of each of the major executive departments; neither the Trump nor Clinton campaigns sent representatives to this initial meeting. At about the same time, the White House began transferring the Obama administration's accumulated electronic files to the National Archives and Records Administration's Electronic Record Archive for preservation.

On July 30, 2016, White House Chief of Staff Denis McDonough spoke with representatives of the Trump and Clinton campaigns to discuss transition arrangements for assuming office in January. McDonough confirmed that the candidates would be eligible for interim national security briefings from the Director of National Intelligence. Clinton's transition team was eligible to use federal workspace in Washington, D.C., and to attend meetings of the White House transition teams. Under the Edward "Ted" Kaufman and Michael Leavitt Presidential Transitions Improvements Act of 2015, both Clinton and Trump's transition teams were granted access to government office space in Washington, D.C. beginning on August 2, 2016. The office space given to each candidates' transition efforts were on different floors of the same building, 1717 Pennsylvania Avenue. Government-provided office space for transition planning and security briefings were only given to Clinton and Trump, with third-party candidates such as the Libertarian Party's Gary Johnson being denied these because the General Services Administration did not judge them to have met the requirements to receive these, which included receiving "significant" enough support in polls, "so as to be realistically considered among the principal contenders."

Clinton's transition team was reported to be trying to remain low-key in their operations, so as not to project overconfidence in the prospects of a Clinton victory.

=== Transition officials and logistics ===
Clinton announced numerous members of her transition team on August 16, 2016, including former Secretary of the Interior Ken Salazar as its chair. Others on the transition team included: Maggie Williams, Neera Tanden, former National Security Adviser Tom Donilon, and former Michigan Governor Jennifer Granholm. Heather Boushey served as the transition team's chief economist. Leah D. Daughtry was tasked with overseeing the transition's personnel department. Carlos Monje would reportedly join the effort, overseeing the agency review teams. Michael Linden would also join, being focused on labor issues. The transition effort would be centered in Washington, D.C., separate from the Clinton campaign operation's location in Brooklyn, New York. The campaign had, per reporting, once considered centering its transition efforts in the same city as its campaign operation, but ultimately decided against this. The transition team's staff in Washington, D.C. was overseen by Ann O'Leary and Ed Meier. Near the end of the campaign, it was reported that Clinton's transition team was significantly smaller in terms of personnel than Trump's was reported to be.

== Consideration of potential appointees ==
On July 3, 2016 The New York Times reported that Clinton planned for her cabinet to be gender equal, with half of its members being female.

In the closing weeks of the election, Clinton was reported to have been nearing a final decision on top advisors for her potential administration, including who she would name to serve as her White House Chief of Staff. It was also reported that the transition team had already begun vetting prospective nominees for several cabinet positions.

=== Potential Supreme Court nominees ===
With the refusal of the Senate to hold hearings on the Supreme Court nomination of Merrick Garland, there was a chance that Clinton would fill the vacancy that stood on the Supreme Court at the election. This meant that, unusual to a presidency, Clinton's early presidency could have not just seen her nominate new Executive Branch officials, but could have also seen her nominate a new Supreme Court justice.

From the beginning of her presidential candidacy, Clinton stated that she desired to nominate justices that would overturn the decision in Citizens United v. FEC, a case allowing corporations and unions to spend unlimited amounts of money on political campaigns. Clinton also voiced support for judges who would vote favorably regarding abortion rights, unions, affirmative action, same-sex marriage, and President Obama's Clean Power Plan and Deferred Action for Parents of Americans program. Clinton also stated that she would look for a nominee who represents the diversity of the country and has professional experience outside of working for large law firms and serving as a judge. Potential nominees listed in August 2016 by the ABA Journal included Cory Booker, Mariano-Florentino Cuéllar, Merrick Garland, Jane L. Kelly, Amy Klobuchar, Lucy H. Koh, Goodwin Liu, Patricia Millett, Jacqueline Nguyen, Sri Srinivasan and Paul J. Watford. Barack Obama's name was also floated.

== Election results ==
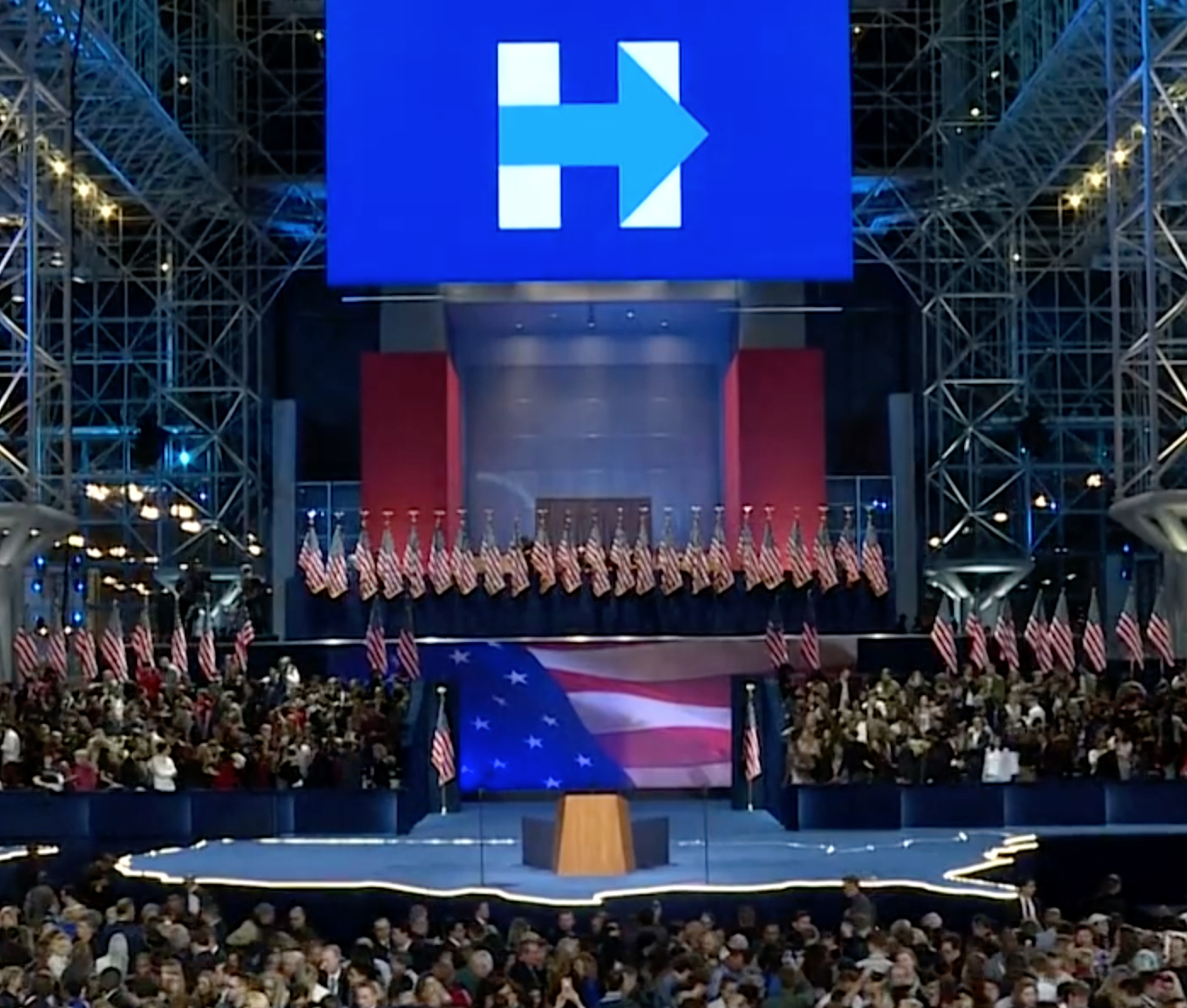
Stage at Clinton's election night celebration at the Javits Center in New York City

Cartogram showing the 2016 Electoral College results. Each square represents one elector.

The Clinton campaign held its election night celebration at the Javits Center in New York City, in an event headlined by speakers including Chuck Schumer, Andrew Cuomo, Bill de Blasio, and Katy Perry. At the conclusion of the event, cannons filled with translucent confetti were set to deploy from the glass roof of the Javits Center to symbolize "breaking the glass ceiling". The campaign initially obtained permits to set off fireworks from a barge on the Hudson River, but cancelled the display on November 7.

Clinton delivering her concession speech on November 9, 2016

As the results came in on election night, November 8, 2016, Clinton lost in multiple states that she had been predicted to win, including the blue wall states of Michigan, Pennsylvania and Wisconsin. In the early morning hours of November 9, media sources declared Trump the winner of the presidency. Clinton lost the electoral vote while winning the popular vote, in what the New York Times called a "surprise outcome" after polls leading up to election day had predicted a Clinton victory. Clinton became the first Democratic presidential contender to have won the national popular vote but lost the electoral college vote since Al Gore in 2000 against Republican George W. Bush. On the advice of then-President Barack Obama, she congratulated Trump on the win in the early morning hours of November 9, 2016, and delivered her public concession speech at 11:50 AM ET, November 9, 2016, at the Grand Ballroom of the New Yorker Hotel.

On November 9, Clinton's Twitter account tweeted, "To all the little girls watching...never doubt that you are valuable and powerful & deserving of every chance & opportunity in the world [to pursue and achieve your own dreams]". Drawn from part of Clinton's concession speech, these words became the most retweeted political tweet of the year, the third most retweeted tweet of the year, and the top retweet in the United States.

Trump received 304 electoral college votes to Clinton's 227, with two Trump electors and five Clinton electors voting for someone else. In the nationwide popular vote, Clinton received over 2.8 million (2.1%) more votes than Trump. This is the widest-ever lead in the popular vote for a candidate who lost the election. It also makes Clinton the first woman to win the popular vote in an election for United States president.

Clinton's upset losses in the "blue wall" states of Michigan, Pennsylvania, and Wisconsin played a major role in the outcome of the campaign.

== Effectiveness ==
After a loss that was widely perceived as a surprise, critics alleged that the Clinton team ran an ineffective campaign. Several issues have been highlighted. A study by Wesleyan Media Project has shown that Clinton's TV ads "were almost entirely policy-free". The researchers wrote that "misallocated advertising funds" and "lack of policy messaging in advertising may have hurt Clinton enough to have made a difference". In Shattered: Inside Hillary Clinton's Doomed Campaign, reporters Jonathan Allen and Amie Parnes state that the campaign had "little vision or inspiration", an "ineffective" strategy that focused on "turnout, not persuasion" and reliance on a "faulty analytic model", amongst other issues. Political scientist Stan Greenberg stated that Clinton focused on "[her] base and identity at the expense of class", that she did not call out "big-money special interests", and that her campaign focused too heavily on "data analytics". Media outlets pointed to other perceived weaknesses in the campaign, including the lack of a coherent message, an unwillingness to heed signs of trouble, and the failure to remedy some voters' perception that Clinton was simply untrustworthy. Chris Cillizza of The Washington Post named Clinton "the worst candidate of 2016".

Despite this, political scientists John M. Sides, Michael Tesler and Lynn Vavreck dispute the criticism that Clinton ran an inept campaign, saying that this is a "myth" and there is little evidence to support the criticism. A common critique of the Clinton campaign is that it did not campaign in Wisconsin (which Trump narrowly won); however, according to a study by political scientist Christopher J. Devine, it is "unclear" from the evidence "whether Clinton also would have gained votes, or even won, in Wisconsin had she campaigned in that state."

In her 2017 memoir What Happened, Clinton characterized her comments on putting "coal miners out of business" and labeling her opponent's supporters as a "basket of deplorables" as political missteps that cost her votes. Clinton also alluded to several external factors that influenced the election results in Trump's favor, including James Comey releasing two letters regarding her email investigation days before the election, the news media, particularly The New York Times for their prioritization of covering her email scandal over other policy issues, and the spoiler effect of Green Party candidate Jill Stein.

== See also ==
- Donald Trump 2016 presidential campaign
- Hillary Clinton 2008 presidential campaign
- Mueller Report
- Shattered: Inside Hillary Clinton's Doomed Campaign, a best-selling book published in April 2017
- Timeline of Russian interference in the 2016 United States elections and Timeline of Russian interference in the 2016 United States elections (July 2016 – election day)
- What Happened by Hillary Clinton, published in September 2017
