= Christelle Vuanga =

DRC politician

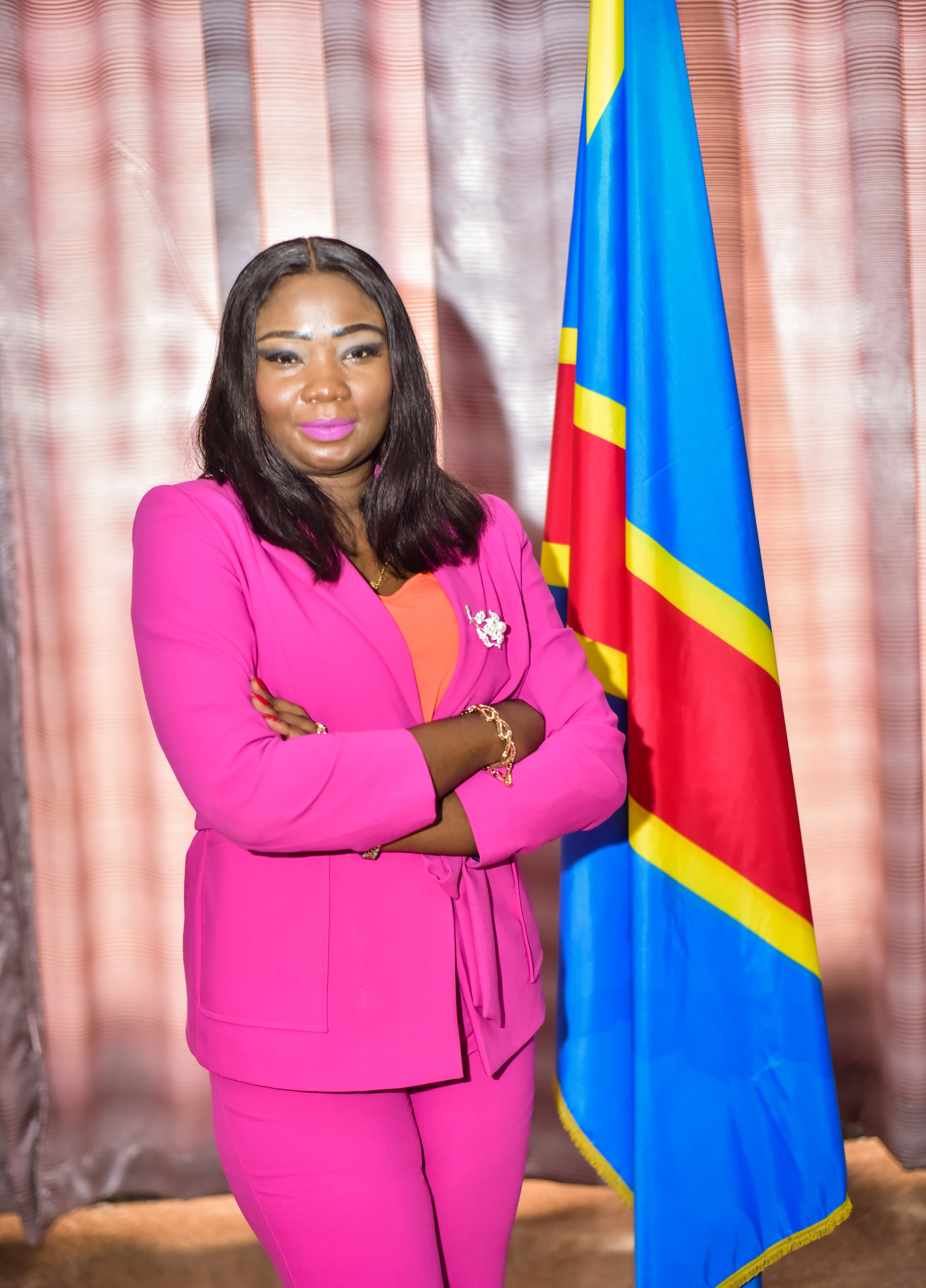
Portrait of Christelle Vuanga

Christelle Vuanga Mukongo (born in 1987) is a DRC politician. She is a deputy in the National Assembly representing the Kinshasa 2 constituency in Kinshasa, on behalf of the Alliance of Movements of Kongo (AMK), a party within Moïse Katumbi's Lamuka Coalition.

== Life ==
Christelle Vuanga Mukongo was born in 1987 in Kinshasa. She trained as a journalist before entering politics, and was President of the Human Rights Commission.

In the 2018 general election Vuanga was elected as the deputy for Kinshasa II. In 2021 she replaced Cathy Musengi as President of the Gender, Child and Family Committee.
