= Lauren Windsor =

American journalist and political consultant

- Occupations: Journalist and political consultant
- Known for: The Undercurrent and Project Veritas Exposed

Lauren Windsor is an American progressive political consultant and self-described "advocacy journalist". She focuses primarily on Wall Street reform, money-in-politics corruption, and climate change. She is executive director of American Family Voices. She is a partner in Democracy Partners and Mike Lux Media.

== Career ==
Windsor began her career in politics as a Wall Street and campaign finance reform activist in the Occupy Wall Street movement and with the Money Out Voters In Coalition in Los Angeles. She traveled around the country documenting protests and met her mentor, Robert Creamer, who founded Democracy Partners, where she is now a partner. She was the deputy communications director for the Tom Steyer 2020 presidential campaign.

Windsor is the creator of The Undercurrent, a field reporting web show launched with The Young Turks Network in 2012. The Undercurrent has covered the Koch brothers' donor retreats, efforts to overturn the 2020 U.S. presidential election, and the operations of James O'Keefe and Project Veritas. Her investigation of the 2014 Koch brothers' summer donor retreat was featured in Jane Mayer's book on the Koch brothers, Dark Money.

In late 2020, Windsor spent six weeks in Georgia during the runoff in both the regular Senate election and the Senate special election covering politicians such as Rudy Giuliani, then-Senator-elect Tommy Tuberville, and then-Senator David Perdue.

Windsor created the investigative website Project Veritas Exposed (PVE), which serves as a research hub for journalists, progressive movement activists, organizations, and campaigns. PVE's research has been featured in The New York Times, Washington Post, The Daily Beast, The Intercept, and other outlets.

On October 29, 2021, Windsor acknowledged helping the Lincoln Project coordinate a political demonstration wherein five fake white supremacists pretended to be supporters of Republican gubernatorial candidate Glenn Youngkin several days before Virginia's election day.

Windsor is a contributor to Huffington Post, DailyKos, and The Nation. She runs her own blog, Lady Libertine, and her videos have appeared on The Rachel Maddow Show, All In with Chris Hayes, The Ed Show, and The Lead with Jake Tapper.

Many of her practices have drawn comparisons to Project Veritas, but she disavows using embedded moles as Project Veritas was purported to do.

=== Supreme Court Historical Society recordings ===
In June 2024, Windsor surreptitiously recorded conversations with Supreme Court Justices John Roberts and Samuel Alito, as well as Alito's wife Martha-Ann Bomgardner, while posing as a Catholic conservative at a gala for the Supreme Court Historical Society.

Some statements from Windsor's recordings include:

- Justice Alito saying "On one side or the other — one side or the other is going to win. I don't know. I mean, there can be a way of working, a way of living together peacefully, but it's difficult, you know, because there are differences on fundamental things that really can't be compromised. They really can't be compromised. So, it's not like you are going to split the difference." This was a response to a statement from Windsor that it was pointless to negotiate with "the left".
- Alito agreeing with Windsor that the US needed to return "to a place of godliness" in relation to the court's inability to identify the source of the Dobbs v. Jackson Women's Health Organization leaks as the Supreme Court is not a law enforcement organization with subpoena power.
- Chief Justice Roberts, on the United States being a Christian nation, "I don't know that we live in a Christian nation ... I know a lot of Jewish and Muslim friends who would say: Maybe not. It's not our job to do that. It's our job to decide the cases as best we can."
- Bomgardner referring to "feminazis", saying "they'[d] go to hell" for their purported belief that she was being controlled by her husband, and expressing a negative opinion of the gay pride flag.

The Supreme Court, and particularly Alito, faced criticism following the release of the recordings. In contrast, the Supreme Court Historical Society condemned the surreptitious recording and revoked Windsor's membership.

Windsor said she recorded the conversations because of her belief that the Supreme Court was "shrouded in secrecy", "refusing to submit to any accountability in the face of overwhelming evidence of serious ethics breaches", and "willing to overturn long-standing precedent in ways that are really extraordinary", as well as her claim that the United States was "at this crossroads of do we continue with a secular democracy or do we let a conservative majority take us down a path of Christian theocracy".

Jane Kirtley, a professor of media ethics and law at the University of Minnesota, said of Windsor, "I think it's fair to say that most ethical journalists deplore those kind of techniques ... How do you expect your readers or your viewers to trust you if you're getting your story through deception?"

The Wall Street Journal editorial board posited of the affair, "The sorry truth about our present political moment is that harassment by the left is shrinking the public space in which Justices, or at least conservative Justices, and their families can operate."

== See also ==
- American Family Voices
- Robert Creamer (political consultant)
