= Supreme Court Historical Society =

Non-profit close to the US Supreme Court

- Established: 1974 (52 years ago)
- Founders: Warren E. Burger
- Types: nonprofit organization
- Legal status: 501(c)(3) organization
- Headquarters: Washington, D.C.
- Country: United States
- Directors: Chilton Davis Varner (President); Gregory P. Joseph (Chair of Board of Trustees)
- Chairpersons: John G. Roberts, Jr. (Hon.)
- Revenue: $2.95 million (2022)
- Total Assets: 16,418,452 United States dollar (2020)

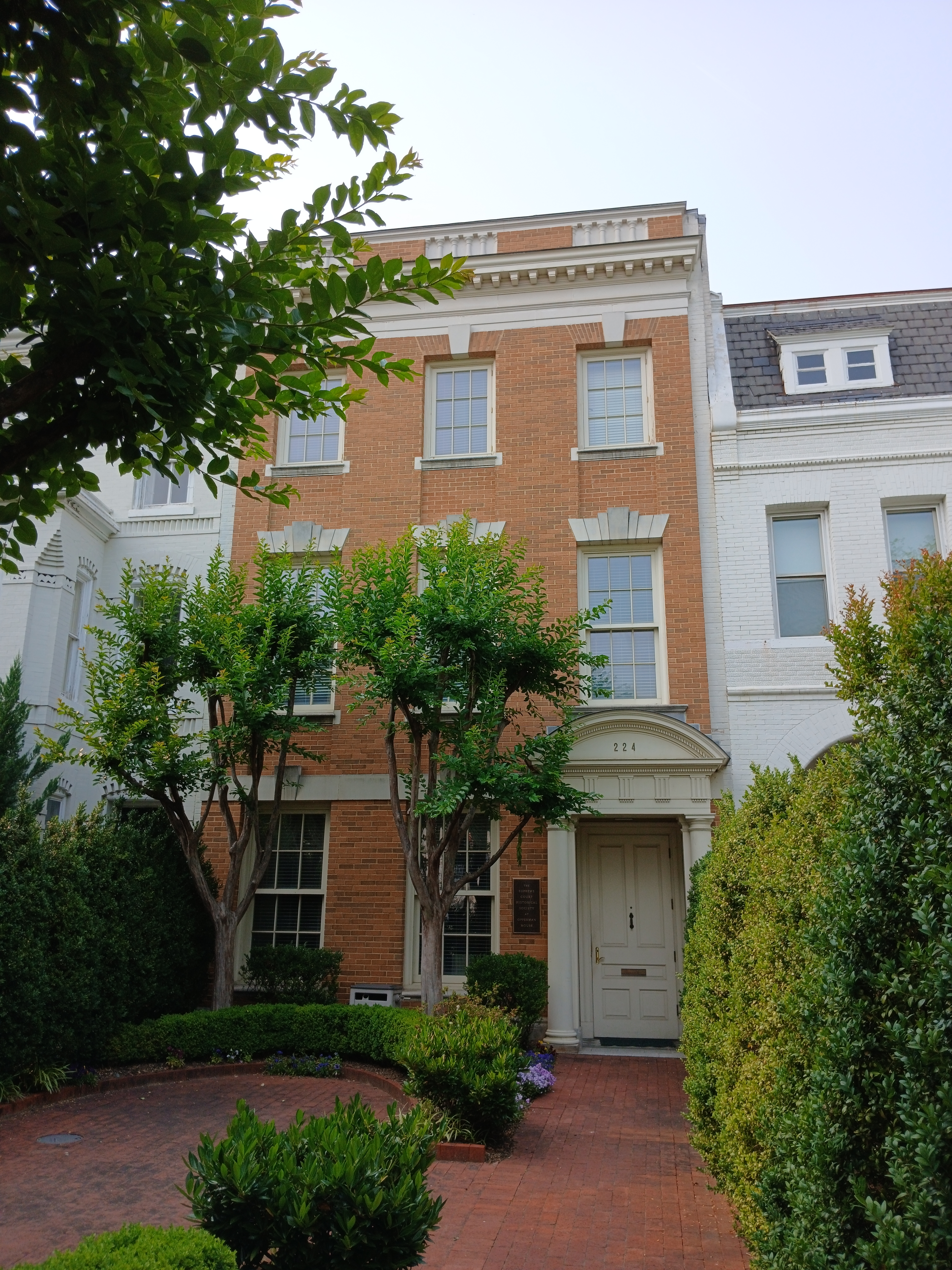
The Supreme Court Historical Society at Opperman House, on Capitol Hill

The Supreme Court Historical Society (SCHS) describes itself as "a Washington, D.C.–based private, nonpartisan, not for profit 501(c)(3) membership organization dedicated to preserving and communicating the history of the U.S. Supreme Court, increasing public awareness of the Court’s contribution to our nation’s rich constitutional heritage, and acquiring knowledge covering the history of the entire Judicial Branch."

The organization has been the source of multiple controversies due to the personal access and apparent influence that donors to the Society acquire regarding Supreme Court justices.

== Activities ==
The Society supports historical research and produces the Journal of Supreme Court History, with Johns Hopkins University Press. Additionally, the Society identifies and acquires artworks and portraits, furniture, documents and artifacts of significance to Supreme Court history that are incorporated into exhibits prepared by the Supreme Court Curator’s Office for visitors. The Chief Justice of the United States has served as Honorary Chairman of the Board of Trustees since the founding.

== Controversy ==
=== Faith and Action influence peddling ===
In July 2022, Rev. Rob Schenck, former head of Faith and Action in the Nation's Capital (Faith and Liberty since 2018), revealed the program of, "for about two decades, forging friendships with conservative justices to 'bolster' their views, particularly on abortion", finessed by donating to the Supreme Court Historical Society to obtain stealth opportunities to meet Supreme Court Justices. Schenck also alerted Chief Justice John Roberts of the extensive operation, by letter, that same month. Access was integral to the "group’s extensive program to influence Justices Thomas, Alito and Scalia through meals and entertainment", dubbed "Operation Higher Court".

Schenck advised people attending the Historical Society annual dinner "see a Justice − boldly approach." He wrote "Your presence alone telegraphs a very important signal to the justices: Christians are concerned about the court and the issues that come before it." Schenck further advised that Justices were more likely to let their guard down at the annual dinners, because they trusted the attendees. In example, through their connection to the Historical Society, Hobby Lobby's owners attended a Christmas party in Supreme Court chambers shortly before litigation was initiated which would become Burwell v. Hobby Lobby Stores, Inc. in 2014. Justice Alito has denied advance disclosure of the court's opinion on the case.

On December 8, 2022, the House Committee on the Judiciary convened a hearing to determine covert activity and influence on SCOTUS members by the Faith and Action group, entitled "Undue Influence: Operation Higher Court and Politicking at SCOTUS", chaired by Jerrold Nadler.

=== The New York Times report ===
On December 30, 2022, The New York Times published an investigative report detailing the society as a "vehicle for those seeking access" to Supreme Court justices. Trustees of the nonprofit society "are expected to give at least $5,000 a year, 'patrons' give between $12,500 and $25,000, and 'benefactors' give more than $25,000", and at least 60 percent of money the society had raised since 2003 that the Times was able to identify, was reported as originating from "corporations, special interest groups, or lawyers and firms that argued cases before the court." The article stated that these donors were given access to the inner workings of the court, and to the justices themselves and that the Historical Society declined to disclose its donors when asked.

=== Board member Harlan Crow ===
Texas billionaire and Supreme Court Historical Society board member Harlan Crow was reported by ProPublica in 2023 to have presented numerous luxury gifts, over two decades, including expensive vacations and private-school tuition, to Justice Clarence Thomas and his wife, Ginni Thomas, as well as another relative. Crow also supplied major funding for Liberty Central, founded in 2009 by Thomas' spouse.

=== Lauren Windsor covert recording ===
In 2024 self-described "advocacy journalist" Lauren Windsor secretly recorded unguarded conversations at the Historical Society annual dinner. Windsor posed as a Catholic conservative. She posted selections from the recordings of two justices and one spouse online. The dinner was for members only, not open to journalists.
