= Adam Kovacevich =

American lobbyist

- Education: Harvard University (BA)
- Political party: Democratic
- Website: Official website

Adam Kovacevich is an American lobbyist and the CEO and founder of Chamber of Progress. He formerly worked as a Google executive and Democratic aide.

== Early life and education ==
Kovacevich is the son of John J. Kovacevich, a California agriculture businessman who owned the 650-acre non-union Kovacevich Vineyards outside Bakersfield, California. He graduated from Harvard University.

While at Harvard, Kovacevich befriended Tom Cotton, and would later support several of the Arkansas Republican's political campaigns. Kovacevich said of Cotton, "I support him as a friend, but that doesn't mean we agree on policies."

Around 1997, as a student, Kovacevich lobbied Harvard to end a ban on serving grapes that had been organized to express solidarity with a 1986 United Farm Workers grape boycott. Supporters of the ban from National Council of La Raza opposed Kovacevich's efforts, saying the grape ban was about respecting the human rights of farmworkers. Kovacevich was successful in having the Harvard grape ban overturned. In 2000, following the vote by Stanford students to overturn their university's grape ban, the United Farm Workers announced a permanent end to its grape boycott.

== Career ==
After graduating from Harvard, Kovacevich worked in Democratic politics. He served as spokesperson for then-congressman Cal Dooley, co-founder of the moderate New Democrat Coalition. He also worked for Senator Joe Lieberman in the United States Senate and on his 2004 presidential campaign and for Inez Tenenbaum on her 2004 campaign for the United States Senate in South Carolina.

His op-eds on tech issues have appeared in media such as the Pittsburgh Tribune-Review, The Philadelphia Inquirer, and Fortune, and he has appeared on TV channels such as Cheddar, C-SPAN, and Bloomberg Television.

=== Career at Google ===
In 2007, he went to work for Google, where he spent 12 years, eventually becoming senior director of public policy. He launched Google's public policy blog in 2007. In his role at Google, he helped the company navigate antitrust scrutiny and competition issues.

Beginning in 2009, Kovacevich built a relationship with law professor and future Federal Trade Commission (FTC) member Joshua D. Wright, known for his focus on antitrust issues. As senior manager of issues and policy communications, he reached out to Wright in 2009, emailing him "we've also been trying to do a better job of talking [with] people about Google's approach to competition, and we'd love to chat with you". Emails show that Wright requested funding for his academic work from Google, saying it would benefit the company "given the otherwise unfriendly antitrust environment that is emerging", which the company agreed to.

Following Donald Trump's election, Kovacevich worked to help Google "build deeper relationships with conservatives" amid government scrutiny, noting the company is "generally seen as liberal by policymakers". Kovacevich left Google in 2019.

== Politics ==
Kovacevich describes himself as a progressive, though others have disputed this assertion. Speaking of Kovacevich, Mike Lux, board chair of American Family Voices, said in 2021 that "there is no evidence that this guy is progressive".

During his time at Google, Kovacevich personally donated to both Democratic and Republican candidates. In 2021, Kovacevich expressed support for President Joe Biden's proposed tax increase on corporations.

== Personal life ==
Kovacevich lives in Arlington, Virginia, and is married with three children.
