= Burns Strider =

American politician (born 1966)

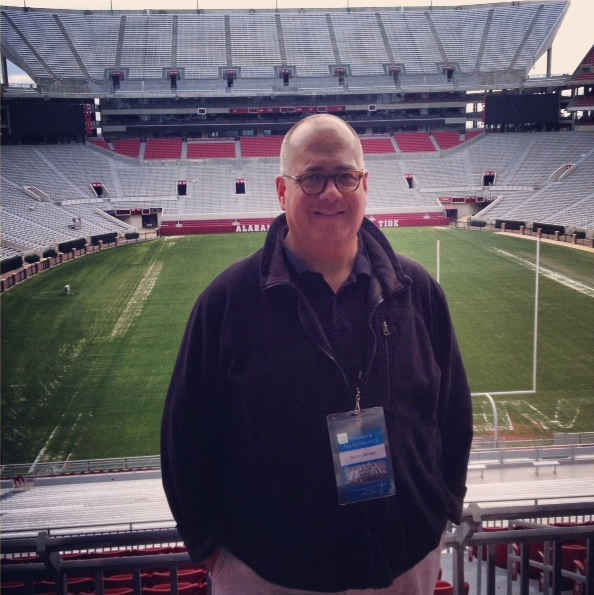
Burns Strider at Bryant–Denny Stadium in Tuscaloosa.

Burns Strider (born January 3, 1966) is an American consultant, lobbyist and former political aide. He is co-founder of the consulting firm The Eleison Group and co-founder and president of the lobbying group American Values Network.

He was senior advisor and director of faith and values outreach to Hillary Clinton in her 2008 presidential campaign, and was at that time described as Clinton's "faith and values guru".

== Career ==
Strider attended Delta State University and Mississippi State University, receiving a bachelor's degree in history.

Strider first worked as an intern for Congressman Mike Espy and Senator Al Gore. He also served as a speechwriter to Mississippi Secretary of State Dick Molpus. He then spent three years as a Southern Baptist youth minister at International Baptist Church of Hong Kong, leading a youth group of more than twenty ethnic groups at the Southern Baptist Convention mega church.

=== Politics ===
Strider served as chief of staff to Congressman Ronnie Shows (D-MS), director of the U.S. House Democratic Faith Working Group and Rural Working Group, director of policy for the U.S. House Democratic Caucus, regional communications director for the Democratic Congressional Campaign Committee, and senior advisor to U.S. House Speaker Nancy Pelosi. He also served as vice president of the Super PAC American Bridge 21st Century and senior advisor to the Super PAC Correct the Record.

Strider held the title of "Senior Adviser for Faith Based Operations" to Hillary Clinton during Clinton's 2008 presidential campaign.

=== Other work ===
Strider has been a commentator for National Public Radio, has made appearances on CNN, CBN, and NBC, and has lectured at various universities and workshops around the nation including Princeton University, Harvard University, Trinity College, the University of Virginia, Mississippi State University, Delta State University, the University of Mississippi, Georgetown University, the Democratic National Convention, the National Leadership Council, and the Young Democrats of America training workshop, among others. He is a regular contributor to the Huffington Post, Faithful Democrats, and Mississippi Business Journal.

In December 2014, Strider was named to the Board of Governors at The Faith and Politics Institute. For his efforts, Religion News Service named Strider one of the 12 most influential Democrats in the nation on faith/values issues and politics.

== Sexual harassment claims ==
According to a January 2018 New York Times report, a co-worker accused Strider of repeatedly sexually harassing her while working for the campaign. The co-worker filed a complaint to the campaign, and Clinton herself decided to keep Strider on the campaign. During the 2016 presidential election, Strider was suspended after several months working at Correct the Record after being the subject of allegations of harassment. Strider has acknowledged many of the incidents as true. Others, he does not recall in the same way as the women alleging misconduct. He has dismissed some of his actions as simply friendly, or characteristic of what he described as his Southern background. He apologized broadly for his behavior. In the case of his conduct toward the woman who worked for him on the Clinton campaign in 2007, Strider said, "I didn't consider it excessive, but that doesn't mean it wasn't to her." Although Clinton was aware of the sexual assault charges in 2008, she chose against counsel from her staff to keep Strider as her spiritual advisor throughout her presidential campaign.

== Personal life ==
Strider was born in Grenada, Mississippi.

He lives in Washington, D.C.
