= Chamber of Progress =

American trade group

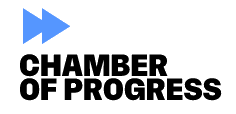
- Formation: November 2020
- Type: Trade association
- Headquarters: McLean, Virginia, United States
- CEO: Adam Kovacevich
- Staff: 5 (2021)
- Website: Official website

The Chamber of Progress is an American trade group that represents technology companies on issues such as antitrust law, content moderation, and self-driving cars. The group describes itself as a progressive advocacy organization, while some have characterized it as an astroturfing corporate front group opposing government regulation and unionization. It was established in 2020 by Adam Kovacevich and is funded by Amazon, Uber, Meta, Google, Apple, Twitter, StubHub, and other technology companies.

== History ==
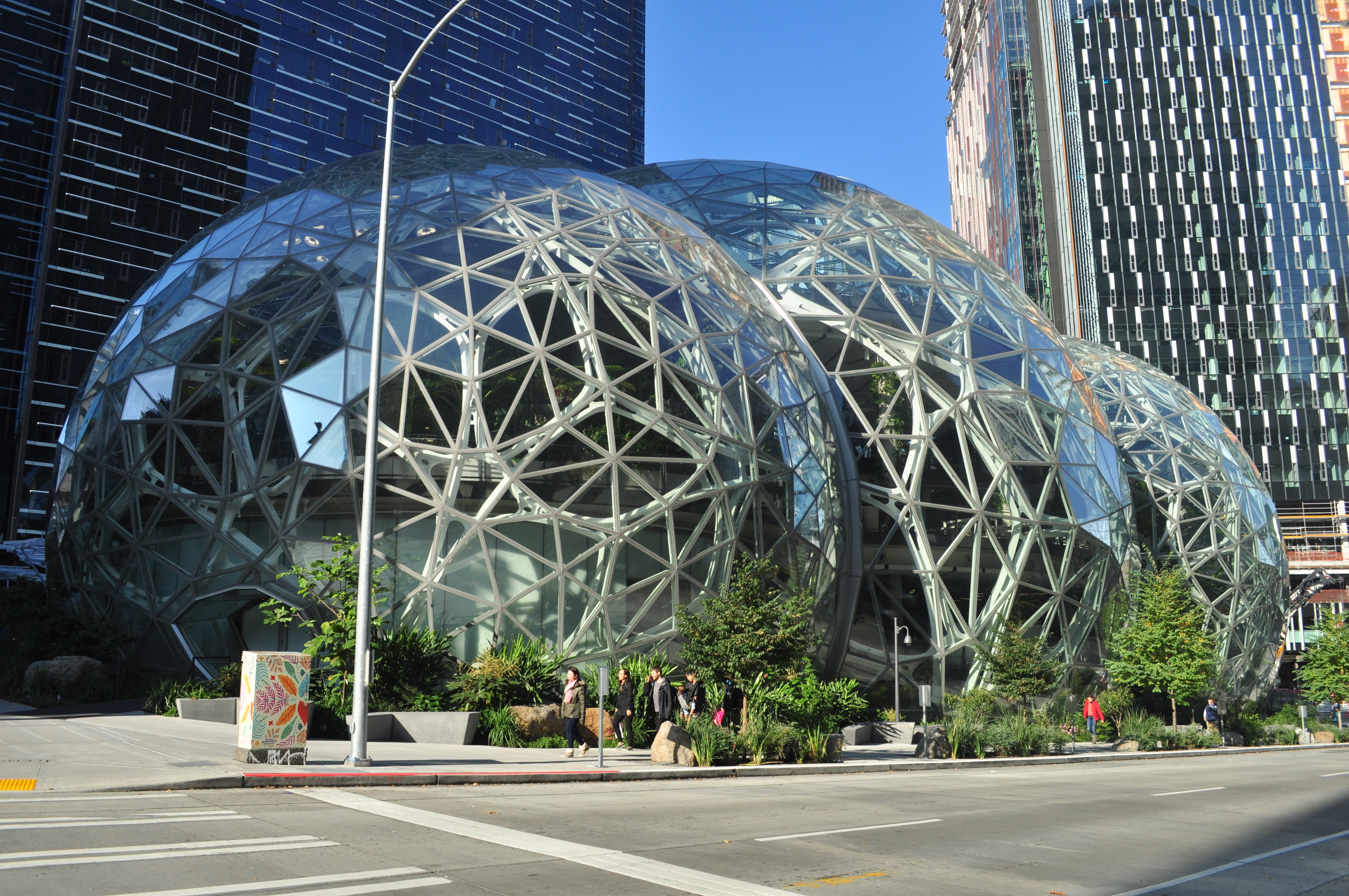
Amazon, whose headquarters are pictured, is among the funders of the Chamber of Progress.

The Chamber of Progress was incorporated in November 2020 and announced in March 2021 by its founder and CEO Adam Kovacevich, a former Google lobbyist, Lime executive, Tom Cotton campaigner, and press secretary to United States Senator Joe Lieberman.

== Leadership and organization ==
The Chamber of Progress is registered as a nonstock 501(c)(6) corporation in Virginia and is headquartered in McLean, Virginia. Its CEO is Adam Kovacevich. As of 2021, the organization's advisory board consists of Colorado State Senator Jeff Bridges, New Jersey State Senator Troy Singleton, Malcom Glenn, Vikrum Aiyer, Roy Bahat, Hillary Brill, Maura Corbett, Michele Jawando, Helen Milby, Joefass Miller, Alejandro Roark, Julie Samuels and California State Assemblymember Blanca Rubio.

The organization is funded by big tech companies such as Amazon, Apple, Facebook, Google, Twitter, Uber, and Zillow, as well as smaller tech companies such as DoorDash, Instacart, Lyft, Nuro, StubHub, Turo, Waymo, and Wing. The Chamber of Progress has a policy of not disclosing the amount of money it receives from its corporate donors.

In May 2021, leaked emails obtained by Politico showed what it described as "a fairly cozy" relationship between the Chamber of Progress and Google. According to the email, a Google public affairs staff member had emailed the company's employees soliciting their assistance in recruiting for a new position the Chamber of Progress was seeking to fill, going on to note that Google maintained "regular communication" with the organization.

As of October 2021, the organization had five employees.

== Positions ==
According to the organization, Chamber of Progress is a "tech industry coalition devoted to a progressive society, economy, workforce, and consumer climate. We back public policies that will build a fairer, more inclusive country in which all people benefit from technological leaps".

Kovacevich has described the organization as committed to advancing progressive policies but is not reflexively anti-business.

=== Autonomous vehicles ===
In an opinion article written by Kovacevich, he supports updating automobile regulations to allow for the deployment of more self-driving cars. The Chamber of Progress is critical of automaker Tesla for marketing its cars as “self-driving” even though they are not fully autonomous.

=== Benefits for rideshare workers ===
The Chamber of Progress opposes legislative efforts in California to reclassify some rideshare and food delivery drivers from independent contractors to employees and has denounced "purists within organized labor" seeking to do so.

=== Consumer protection ===
The Chamber of Progress opposed the 2021 INFORM Consumers Act, a bi-partisan bill intended by its sponsors to curtail the trafficking of fraudulent goods by ecommerce sites.

=== Corporate taxes ===
The Chamber of Progress supports raising corporate taxes, in order to help fund the American Jobs Plan.

=== Health misinformation regulation ===
The Chamber of Progress has opposed legislation in Texas and Florida that would limit the ability of social media platforms to take down misinformation and other content that violates community standards. The organization also opposed legislation proposed by United States Senators Amy Klobuchar and Ben Ray Lujan that would hold social media companies liable for the dissemination of false or erroneous health and medical information and advice.

=== Monopolization ===
In 2021, Chamber of Progress submitted comments opposing the Federal Trade Commission's (FTC) proposed revocation of a 2015 policy statement that prohibited the FTC from challenging unfair competition that stops short of violating antirust laws. The statement was ultimately revoked over the Chamber of Progress' objections. The same year it took the lead in opposing a package of new antitrust legislation proposed by David Cicilline and Pramila Jayapal and according to Slate, sought to "slow down the legislative process so that ... [they'd] have more time to win over lawmakers to vote the bills down".

=== Tech regulation ===
The Chamber of Progress supports proposals to provide additional funding for the Federal Trade Commission to create a new tech bureau focused on privacy, data security, and identity theft. The organization opposes reform or repeal of Section 230, arguing that this internet legislation incentivizes companies to delete lawful but objectionable content, like hate speech.

=== Ticketing reform ===
Chamber of Progress has opposed federal and state legislation backed by musicians, arts nonprofits and independent venues targeting predatory resale practices by secondary ticketing platforms, including the Fans First Act and Maryland's SB 539.

=== Unionizing ===
In April 2021, the Chamber of Progress released a statement opposing Amazon worker unionizing efforts in Alabama and denouncing "union activists". According to Vice, the organization said that "Amazon employees' rejection of the union was a 'progressive story'".

=== Voting legislation ===
The Chamber of Progress supports the For the People Act and the John Lewis Voting Rights Act.

== Analysis ==
Sarah Miller, executive director of the American Economic Liberties Project, has described the organization as an "astroturf group" which masquerades as a progressive organization but is designed to head-off governmental regulation of its member companies. Mike Lux of American Family Voices has said of the organization that it shows no evidence "that tech companies are going to put any energy or money or muscle or attention to supporting progressive causes". Vivek Ramaswamy has dismissed the organization as "crony capitalism at its heart". Writing in Jewish Currents, Cilo Chang called the group "progressive camouflage" for anti-union organizing. Public Citizen's Jane Chung has said Chamber of Progress is "sleight of hand" and that it uses "progressive slogans, and interests like 'democracy reform' and 'income equality' ... all the while, we know that this is really just a front group for advancing corporate interests in Washington".

United States Senator Amy Klobuchar has expressed skepticism with the Chamber of Progress, saying – with respect to the group's name – "you're honest that what you are is really the tech companies' Chamber of Commerce. But at least the Chamber of Commerce has a real name".

United States Representative Ami Bera has applauded the organization and said that the Democratic Party will be working with the group "in defining the next chapter of tech policy". In her email newsletter, Nancy Scola says the Chamber is positioned to take advantage of the disconnect between lawmakers' opposition to tech companies and consumers' embrace of them.

Emily Birnbaum, a journalist with Politico, noted in 2021 that the Chamber of Progress now receives much of the media attention that used to go to the Internet Association.

== See also ==
- American Edge
- Computer and Communications Industry Association
