= Correct the Record =

Hybrid PAC/super PAC founded by David Brock

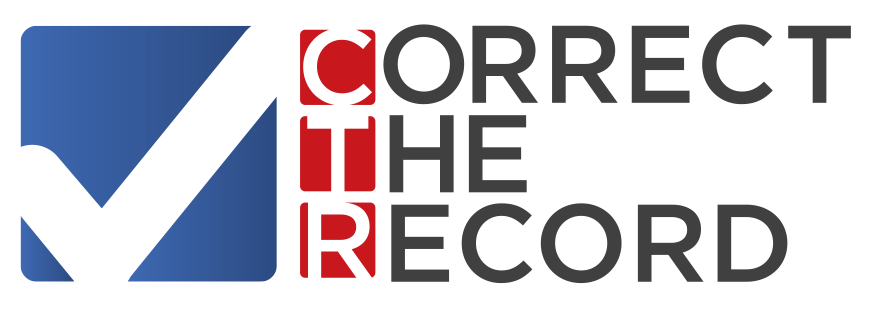
- Predecessor: American Bridge 21st Century
- Formation: 2015
- Founder: David Brock
- Type: Super PAC
- Purpose: Supported Hillary Clinton's 2016 U.S. presidential campaign
- Headquarters: Washington, D.C.
- Methods: Opposition research against Bernie Sanders & Donald Trump
- Website: correctrecord.org (Deactivated Dec 31, 2016) (Archived Feb 8, 2016)

Correct the Record was a hybrid PAC/super PAC founded by David Brock. It supported Hillary Clinton's failed 2016 presidential campaign. The PAC aimed to "find and confront social media users" who posted "unflattering messages about the Democratic front-runner".

== History ==
The organization was created in May 2015 when it spun off from American Bridge 21st Century, another Democratic Super PAC. It coordinated with Clinton's 2016 U.S. presidential campaign via a loophole in campaign finance law that it says permits coordination with digital campaigns.

== Purpose ==
In July 2015, Correct the Record teamed with Priorities USA Action, another pro-Clinton super PAC, to create a fundraising committee called American Priorities '16.

In October 2015, historian Allida Black and political strategist Connor Shaw launched "Let's Talk Hillary" in partnership with Correct the Record and Wild Onion Media. The $1 million project was used to give Hillary Clinton's long time friends and co-workers a platform to describe the woman they knew. The project was largely considered a success and awarded numerous awards, including the Golden Donkey in 2015.

In April 2016, Correct the Record announced that it would be spending $1 million to find and confront social media users who post unflattering messages about Clinton in a "task force" called "Barrier Breakers 2016". In addition to this, the task force aimed to encourage Sanders supporters to support Clinton and to thank both "prominent supporters and committed superdelegates". The organization's president, Brad Woodhouse, said they had "about a dozen people engaged in [producing] nothing but positive content on Hillary Clinton" and had a team distributing information "particularly of interest to women". A spokesperson also claimed that posts from the organization were "always identified" as being from it.

The Super PAC ran ads against Bernie Sanders during the Democratic primary.

In September 2016, Correct the Record announced a project called "Trump Leaks". Correct the Record said it would pay anonymous tipsters for unflattering scoops about Donald Trump, including audio and video recordings and internal documents.

On December 31, 2016, the official website was deactivated from its host's servers WPEngine.

== Legality ==
Super PACs, officially known as "independent expenditure-only committees", are political committees that are legally only allowed to make expenditures that are independent of specific campaigns and which are not coordinated with a candidate or political party. However, Correct the Record says its activities do not fall under this campaign coordination ban restriction, relying on a 2006 Federal Election Commission "Internet exemption" regulation that said that content posted online for free is off limits from regulation. According to FEC rules, online postings do not technically count as campaign expenditures, which allows independent groups to consult with candidates about the content they post on their sites.

== Criticism ==
In June 2016, Correct the Record was criticized over the hiring of Sidney Blumenthal who was paid $200,000 per year for part time work. Critics charged that his hiring was politically motivated.

During the 2016 election, Correct the Record suspended former Clinton adviser Burns Strider over allegations of sexual harassment.
