= Robert Creamer (political consultant) =

American political consultant

- Born: June 28, 1947 (age 79)
- Education: Duke University (BA)
- Occupations: Political consultant, community organizer, author
- Political party: Democratic
- Spouse(s): Day Piercy (divorced); Jan Schakowsky

Robert Creamer is an American political consultant, community organizer, and author. He is the husband of congresswoman Jan Schakowsky, the Representative for Illinois's 9th congressional district. His firm, Democracy Partners, works with progressive electoral and issue campaigns and has 34 partners located throughout the United States.

Creamer has been a progressive strategist and political organizer for over 50 years, beginning during the Civil Rights and anti Vietnam War movements of the 1960s. He worked as an organizer with Saul Alinsky's last major project in Chicago. Later he founded and then led Illinois's largest coalition of progressive organizations and unions for twenty-three years. Creamer became a political consultant in 1997, and served as a consultant to the Democratic National Committee during the 2008, 2012, and 2016 Presidential election campaigns. In 2005, Creamer was one of the architects and organizers of the successful campaign to defeat the privatization of Social Security. He has also been a consultant to the campaigns to end the war in Iraq, increase the minimum wage, and pass progressive budget priorities, pass and defend the Affordable Care Act, oppose right wing judicial nominees, and pass comprehensive immigration reform.

== Early life and education ==
Creamer was born in 1947. He graduated from Duke University in 1969, writing his thesis, "Duke Employees Local 77: Confrontation over Impartial Arbitration of Grievances", about the AFSCME Local 77 union. He later did graduate work in Ethics and Society at the University of Chicago.

During his high school years, Creamer lived in Shreveport, Louisiana where he became involved in the civil rights movement. At Duke, he expanded his activity as a student activist organizing for civil rights, ending the Vietnam War, and economic justice.

Creamer helped organize "the Duke Vigil" after the assassination of Martin Luther King Jr. The silent "Vigil", which ultimately included thousands of students, demanded that Duke increase the pay of its mainly African American non-academic employees, take steps leading to the recognition of their union (Local 77 of AFSCME), and that the President of the university withdraw from the all-white Hope Valley Country Club. Soon after it began these demands were bolstered by a strike of the non-academic employee union and many in the Duke faculty. Four days after the Vigil began, the University Administration came to an agreement with the demonstrators that ultimately met the protester's demands. Creamer served as Chair of the Vigil Strategy Committee.

== Career ==
=== Community organizing and political consultancy ===
Creamer began his organizing career in 1970 working with Chicago's Citizen Action Program (CAP), the last project of community organizer Saul Alinsky. At CAP, Creamer was trained by the organization's Executive Director, Peter Martinez. Creamer and Martinez are now both partners in the consulting firm Democracy Partners. During his tenure, CAP successfully campaigned to reduce the sulfur dioxide in Chicago's air by almost two-thirds and stopped a major urban expressway.

Creamer founded the Illinois Public Action Council (later known as Illinois Citizen Action) in 1974, a statewide coalition of progressive organizations that included unions, farm groups, senior citizen organizations, community groups, consumer advocates, environmental and peace organizations. It became Illinois's largest consumer advocacy organization, advocating for lower utility rates (including the formation of a state-sponsored utility rates watchdog organization), environmental concerns, and legislation benefiting senior citizens. In addition to conducting issue mobilization campaigns to promote progressive policies in Springfield and Washington, it established a political committee that supported progressive candidates. The organization led a national shift of grass roots citizen organizations into electoral politics. At its height the organization was a substantial presence in Illinois politics. It ultimately had offices in five cities, 130 organizational affiliates and 150,000 individual members, across Illinois.

However, the organization had money problems, defaulting on several loans and owing back taxes. It was also criticized for the support it received from special interest groups, including personal injury lawyers and a loan from what was then one of the world's most profitable casinos, and for Creamer's failure to register as a lobbyist under Illinois state law. Creamer directed the organization for 23 years. He resigned after being questioned by federal law enforcement about a Citizen Action affiliate's $1 million bank overdraft.

In 1997, Creamer co-founded the Strategic Consulting Group, a political consulting firm that works with issue and electoral campaigns. His clients have included MoveOn.org, Americans United for Change, and USAction. He helped organize a successful campaign to stymie the privatization of Social Security. He has acted as a consultant for campaigns geared towards ending the Iraq War, enacting comprehensive immigration reform, and passing universal health care legislation, and enacting gun violence prevention legislation. Creamer has worked on numerous Democratic Party campaigns.

Strategic Consulting Group (SCG) organized field operations for scores of Congressional and state-wide races. In 2011, SCG joined with a number of other progressive consultants to form a group practice, called Democracy Partners.

During the Obama Administration Creamer worked closely with the White House to coordinate the effort to mobilize support for the Iran nuclear agreement, pass the Affordable Care Act, mobilize support for Obama nominees to the Supreme Court, and pass the Dodd–Frank Wall Street Reform and Consumer Protection Act.

Strategic Consulting Group, led by Creamer, and other progressive consultants across the country organized into a larger group practice of political consulting firms, forming Democracy Partners in 2011

Creamer spoke at the 2010 America's Future Now Conference. Creamer signed The Progressive Agenda to Combat Income Inequality, an initiative launched by New York City Mayor Bill de Blasio on May 12, 2015.

To document the history of community organizing during the 20th Century in the United States, the Center for Community Change created the Community Organizer Genealogy Project. Brown University maintains this archive, which includes an interview with Creamer concerning his work and career.

Since 2016, Creamer devoted much of his time to the progressive movement organizing against the policies of then President Donald Trump – and electing progressive Democrats.

Starting in early 2017, he convened twice-weekly Progressive Mobilization calls for the broad Progressive Community. His firm has worked with progressive organizations and unions to mobilize support for progressive initiatives in Congress like COVID-19 relief, gun violence prevention programs and tax cuts for the wealthy – generating tens of thousands of calls to Congress through its patch-through call programs from constituents.

Creamer also worked with his partner in Democracy Partners, Heather Booth, who served as Director of Progressive and Senior Mobilization for the Biden for President campaign in the 2020 General Election.

=== Stopping the Crosstown Expressway in Chicago ===
In the early 1970s, Peter Martinez, then Director of the Citizens Action Program (CAP), asked Creamer to become lead organizer of the campaign to stop the Crosstown Expressway in Chicago. Had it been built, the Crosstown Expressway would have been, per mile, the most expensive highway in the history of humankind. It would also have displaced 30,000 residents and 10,000 places of business. Just as importantly, CAP felt that its construction would have continued the diversion of money to urban expressways and away from mass transit.

The campaign was organized around Catholic parishes on Chicago's Northwest and Southwest sides, as well as the town of Cicero. On the South Side, African-American churches were the main building block. It brought together a multi-racial coalition in a common battle that didn't happen often in 1970s Chicago.

The campaign's major constituency consisted of people who lived along the proposed route. In many areas it engaged the pastors of the big Catholic parishes that would be impacted. It also involved leaders in the parishes that mattered to the pastor: the group that ran the Holy Name, the Altar and Rosary societies; the crew that ran the church bingo; the leaders at the church parochial school. In some sections it engaged more traditional community organizations, small business associations and block clubs.

Many of the tactics involved "actions" where middle-class whites and blacks took on public officials with TV cameras in tow. CAP held mass meetings with officials. It released reports on the impact of the highway and it organized a march of 10,000 people near Midway Airport. In the end, the coalition of groups conducted a voter education project that helped the Democrat Dan Walker defeat Republican Governor Dick Ogilvie. Walker had promised to kill the project if he won and transfer the funding to mass transit.

Election night 1972 ended with a declaration of victory by Walker, and his announcement that the Crosstown Expressway would not be built. Many of the decisive votes had come from the “Crosstown Corridor.” Eventually, much of the money that had been set aside to build the Crosstown Expressway was transferred to fund two major mass transit projects – building the Orange Line from downtown Chicago to Midway airport, and expending the Blue Line rapid transit service to O’Hare airport.

=== Bringing Field Operations Back to Center Stage in National Democratic Campaigns ===
In 1974, Creamer was approached by a former door-to-door encyclopedia salesman named Marc Anderson, who believed that public interest organizations could use door-to-door techniques to organize members and raise money. Anderson joined with Creamer in setting up the Illinois Public Action Council which immediately launched a door-to-door canvassing program. The program eventually operated out of five offices in Illinois and contacted thousands of people each night at the door. It continued for 23 years. Anderson set up similar programs throughout the country for other Citizen Action organizations and public interest groups and environmental organizations that still use them today.

In addition to recruiting members, raising money and motivating people to take action on issues, these door-to-door canvasses would tell voters about the endorsements of the Illinois Public Action's PAC. Senator Paul Simon often credited his defeat of Republican Chuck Percy to Illinois Public Action's canvass.

Creamer worked for years in Chicago, where door-to-door operations were often key to winning elections, and where progressive candidates often had to compete with the patronage army of the first Mayor Richard Daley. One of those progressive candidates was Abner Mikva, a progressive icon who was elected to Congress against the Daley machine by organizing his own army of volunteers.

That was the model Creamer adopted to support his wife, Jan Schakowsky, when she first ran for Congress in 1998. Creamer and Schakowsky Campaign Manager, Jerry Morrison, put ads out across the country offering aspiring young organizers the opportunity to come to Chicago to participate in a progressive campaign for Congress and learn organizing first-hand in a "campaign school" coupled with a field program. The campaign hired 15 organizers, provide the regular training seminars with top notch political strategists. Those organizers built an army of 1,500 volunteers who identified 30,000 Schakowsky voters and turned them out door-to-door Election Day.

Schakowsky won handily, beating the Regular Democratic Organization candidate Howie Carroll and wealthy investor JB Pritzker (current Governor of Illinois).

The success of that effort led to the creation of the Democratic Campaign Management Program that recruited and trained aspiring campaign professionals who served as organizers for scores of Democratic races across the country.

By 2000, Strategic Consulting Group's Campaign Management Program did 20 key swing Congressional races at a time when many Democratic political consultants still believed that the TV was the new "precinct captain." Creamer believed that person to person, door-to-door and phone contact were the critical to persuasion – and essential for serious get out the vote operations.

In fact, as late as 1998, the Democratic Congressional Campaign Committee (DCCC) did not have a national field director.

Following their 1998 victory, Creamer and Schakowsky lobbied the DCCC to hire Cathy Duvall, who had served as a DCCC regional political director, to run the DCCC's field program. Duval was hired and over time the DCCC's field operation has taken on the responsibility of consulting and supervising massive field programs in all of its swing races.

Democratic presidential campaigns expanded their field focus as well, culminating in the massive field effort for Barack Obama's 2008 Presidential Race. Creamer was asked to teach at the "Camp Obama" sessions for early interns and organizers in that effort.

=== Campaign Against Social Security Privatization ===
Late in 2004, President George W. Bush began to hint that he would propose a plan to privatize Social Security. It was to be the underpinning of his ownership society – the central domestic initiative of his second term. The fight over the proposal to privatize Social Security would become one of the defining battles of Bush's second term domestic policy.

A campaign to oppose privatization was assembled by major progressive organizations and unions, and was named Americans United to Protect Social Security. Experienced political operative Paul Tewes became campaign manager and Brad Woodhouse, who had been Communications Director of the Democratic Senatorial Campaign Committee, was named Communications Director. Creamer served initially as its General Consultant, and later became the Field Director of the effort.

The first priority of the campaign was to develop a message that addressed the administration's arguments. Polling determined there should be three strategic objectives:

1. Undermine the presumption that there was a Social Security “crisis.”
2. Remind Americans that Social Security was a spectacular success
3. Persuade elite, public and swing congressional opinion that the proposed solutions for the problems of Social Security was much worse than the disease

The Bush administration campaigned their efforts as a necessary fix to what they claimed to be a broken system. The Campaign countered this narrative by leading with a message that action was needed to guarantee Social Security remained secure over the long run, but the Bush plan to privatize Social Security would only make matters worse by siphoning $2 trillion from the Social Security Trust Fund. The Campaign argued that the Republican Party's true motivation was to fabricate a Social Security crisis motivated by Wall Street's desires to access the Social Security Trust Fund.

The campaign had to prevent Democrats from proposing their own "solution." The campaign realized that any legislation that involved Social Security during the Republican Congress and Bush presidency would necessarily involve privatization.

Creamer advised the campaign to take on the presidential road show that was intended to promote the proposal. The president formally announced his plan in his State of the Union message in January 2005. He also announced an extensive tour to sell the plan. Over the next four months he held 60 events throughout the country, focused on target congressional districts.

At every one of these 60 stops, Americans United organized an event to counter his message. Each time, the formula was similar. The day before the president arrived, it held a press event to frame the debate and attack his plan. The events the day before he arrived provided a hook for the press that made that story more interesting. On the day of the president's visit, AUPSS would put on a mass turnout event as close to the president's event as possible. These featured lots of people holding large black and yellow Day-Glo signs with messages similar to "Hands Off My Social Security." Any picture of the protest would therefore deliver the message with or without written copy. The visual of hundreds of signs was always widely covered, and often spokespeople would give a counterpoint to the president on television as well.

The campaign then took on naming the battle. It succeeded early in naming the president's proposal, as his attempt to "privatize" Social Security. The research showed that people were much more prone to consider a proposal to create "personal accounts" – which the administration tried desperately to name the proposal. They claimed they didn't want to "privatize Social Security," just create "personal accounts." The fact that the campaign was able to name the issue was critical.

Creamer helped organize groups of angry seniors to confront targeted members of Congress at town meetings and public appearances. When Republican targets waffled, the campaign ran a month-long "Take A Stand" campaign, demanding that they go on record as either for privatization or against it.

The campaign also got state legislatures and city councils to pass resolutions against privatization, and generated tens of thousands of phone calls to congressional offices through "patch through" calls and email alerts. Finally, the Campaign planned a 4,000-person rally to coincide with the first day of Congressional hearings on the plan. One hundred forty members of the House and Senate, including the Democratic leadership of both houses, marched onto bleachers at the front of the crowd and each pledged not to privatize Social Security.

By early summer the polls had turned against privatization, and there was no further legislative movement.

The closing act in the privatization battle was a celebration of the 70th anniversary of Social Security, held in August 2005. The event gave Americans United the opportunity to highlight the importance of Social Security's guaranteed benefits. AU organized 70th anniversary celebrations around the country, especially in targeted districts. It also organized a commemoration ceremony at the Roosevelt Memorial that was widely covered nationally.

By early fall, the pundits began writing the obits – Bush's plan to privatize Social Security was dead. In the spring of 2006, Washington Post columnist E.J. Dionne wrote, "The collapse of the Social Security initiative was thus more than a policy failure. It was a decisive political defeat that left Bush and Rove with no fallback ideas around which to organize domestic policy."

After the 2006 mid-term election victories, Rick Klein of the Boston Globe wrote, "Democrats made huge gains in the mid-term elections for a variety of factors – an unpopular war in Iraq, congressional scandals, frustration with Bush's style of leadership."

But the victory had its roots in that early and successful battle against Social Security reform, which gave Democrats crucial unity and momentum at a time when many pundits were predicting a permanent Republican majority, according to party strategists and veteran Democratic lawmakers.

=== Bank fraud and failure to pay withholding tax convictions ===
On March 11, 2004, Creamer, then the former executive director of the Illinois Public Action Fund, was indicted in federal court on 16 counts of bank fraud involving three alleged check-kiting schemes in the mid-1990s, leading several banks to experience temporary shortfalls of at least $2.3 million. Though the check kiting was widely reported in 1997, the Justice Department did not seek an indictment until 7 years later. In August 2005, Creamer pleaded guilty to one count of failure to collect $1,892 in withholding tax and one count of bank fraud, for writing checks with insufficient funds. All of the money was immediately repaid from the organization's receivables. His wife, Jan Schakowsky was not accused of any wrongdoing, although she served on the organization's board during the time the crimes occurred, and signed the IRS filings along with her husband. The U.S. district judge noted that Creamer was not a typical bank fraud defendant and that he had no intention of causing a loss. He went on to note that no one suffered "out of pocket losses," and Creamer acted not out of personal greed but in an effort to keep his community action group going without cutting programs, though prosecutors argued that Creamer paid his own $100,000 salary with fraudulently obtained funds. More than 200 people wrote letters of support on Creamer's behalf, including U.S. Senator Dick Durbin (D-IL), Cook County Clerk David Orr, consultant David Axelrod, and Rev. Jesse Jackson.

On April 5, 2006, Creamer was sentenced to five months in prison and 11 months of house arrest. Creamer served his five-month incarceration at the Federal Correction Institute in Terre Haute, Indiana and was released on November 3, 2006.

=== Securing the Iran Nuclear Agreement ===
After President Obama's administration had completed negotiating the agreement to prevent Iran from acquiring nuclear weapons in 2015 (the Joint Comprehensive Plan of Action or JCPOA), it had one final obstacle to consummate the deal. It had to assure that the agreement had sufficient support in Congress to assure that the President could veto any legislation that might pass Congress to invalidate the deal without the threat that the veto would be overridden by two-thirds of both the House and Senate.

At the time, Creamer was General Consultant to Americans United for Change (AUC), and had been working closely with the Obama White House to mobilize public support for Obama's initiatives. He had served as a consultant to the Obama Campaign and the DNC for Obama's original Presidential Campaign in 2008, and his reelection campaign in 2012.

He and Americans United for Change went to work in early 2015 to help set the stage for the coming battle over the Iran Nuclear Agreement by commissioning a poll by Hart Research to determine the most persuasive arguments for the agreement.

Creamer and AUC worked closely with the Ploughshares Fund, Win Without War, MoveOn.org, the Iran Project, and J Street to assemble a broad coalition of organizations supporting the Agreement.

J Street was especially crucial. Since it was founded in 2007, J Street had established itself as the major organization in the Jewish Community that was both pro-Israel and in favor of a two-state solution to resolve the Israeli-Palestinian conflict in the Middle East. By 2015, the American Israel Public Affairs Committee (AIPAC), had come to represent a shrinking minority of more right-wing American Jews – and had increasing allied itself with the Republican Party. It had also become increasing clear that J Street represented the vast majority of American Jews.

J Street's support for the agreement gave political cover to many Jewish Members of Congress who wanted to support it. In his book, Losing an Enemy: Obama, Iran, and the Triumph of Diplomacy, Trita Parsi quotes Creamer saying, "J Street gave Members of Congress cover to do what was right, whereas before J Street that would not have happened." The organization also provided enormous amounts of person-power and money to mobilize grass roots support.

=== Feud with Glenn Beck ===
In December 2009, conservative Fox News host Glenn Beck criticized Creamer for accompanying his wife, Congresswoman Jan Schakowsky, to a November 2009 state dinner at the White House (the same dinner was noted in the media for its security breaches). On his show, Beck highlighted Creamer's convictions and called Creamer's book a "prison manifesto", claiming that it had been the basis for the Affordable Care Act. Creamer later retorted that "[t]his is a man who lies about everything" and called Beck a part of a "new McCarthyist movement of the far right."

=== Project Veritas videos ===
In October 2016, activist James O'Keefe's Project Veritas Action released hidden-camera videos showing Creamer and others who worked for firms hired by the Hillary Clinton campaign engaging in conversations about voter registration. The videos have together garnered over 12 million views as of October 2016. One clip in the video shows Creamer meeting with an undercover activist posing as potential donor. After the actor suggests finding a way around voter registration laws, Creamer responds "my fear is that someone would decide that this is a big voter fraud scheme."

They also discussed using operatives in Donald Duck costumes to remind voters that Donald Trump had not released his tax returns, and referred to the scheme as something Clinton wanted. A subordinate seemingly discussed tactics for baiting supporters into violence at Trump rallies.

As a result of the video, Creamer announced he was stepping back from his firm's contract with the Democratic National Committee. Creamer's Democracy Partners released a statement on October 18, 2016:

Our firm has recently been the victim of a well-funded, systematic spy operation that is the modern-day equivalent of the Watergate burglars. The plot involved the use of trained operatives using false identifications, disguises and elaborate false covers to infiltrate our firm and others, to steal campaign plans, and goad unsuspecting individuals into making careless statements on hidden cameras. One of those individuals was a temporary regional subcontractor who was goaded into statements that do not reflect our values.

Creamer described the contractor's statements in the video as "unprofessional and careless hypothetical conversations" and said that the schemes discussed had not taken place. Former interim democratic chairperson Donna Brazile similarly said, "We do not believe, or have any evidence to suggest, that the activities articulated in the video actually occurred."

Trump senior communications adviser Jason Miller said, "In a totally disqualifying act that is a violent threat to our democracy, Hillary Clinton directly involved herself in inciting violence directed at Trump supporters." The statement demanded an investigation into the matter.

The Clinton campaign said that Project Veritas has "been known to offering misleading video out of context." They denied that the Donald Duck costumes were Clinton's idea, stating that:

While Hillary Clinton can't claim credit for coming up with a duck to highlight how Donald Trump is refusing to release his tax returns, she certainly was amused watching him ride up and down Trump Tower's escalator.

In June 2017, Creamer, and Democracy Partners filed a lawsuit against O'Keefe and his organization, Project Veritas, seeking a million dollars in damages for various violations of DC and Federal law. The case was heard in Federal Court in Washington, DC. In September 2022 a jury ruled against Project Veritas on a claim of fraudulent misrepresentation, awarding $120,000 to Democracy Partners. On August 21, 2026, the United States Court of Appeals for the D.C. Circuit reversed the judgment in full. The panel held that the First Amendment barred the damages award because the published video's protected content was the principal cause of the contract losses claimed, not the Project Veritas operative's unlawful infiltration of the firm. Judge Robert L. Wilkins concurred in part and dissented in part, writing that he would have upheld the fraud verdict with nominal damages and affirmed on the wiretapping claims. Counsel for Creamer and Democracy Partners said they disagreed with the ruling and were evaluating next steps.

== Publications ==
=== Nuts and Bolts: The Formula for Progressive Electoral Success ===
In 2024, Creamer published Nuts and Bolts: The Formula for Progressive Electoral Success. The book focuses on the principles of political communication and political organizing, and is written to be a "a step-by-step field manual for how progressives can win electoral campaigns".

In it, Creamer covers the fundamentals of electoral organizing, political communication, understanding the self-interest of the voters, political fundraising, using social media and other new technologies, creating high intensity field programs, voter mobilization, the qualities of great organizers.

In the book's introduction Creamer says, “The success of the battle for the future of American Democracy - the struggle for progressive values-the battle between democracy and autocracy-between hope and fear-will not be determined entirely by the merits of our values or even the strength of our conviction. It will be determined by how well American progressives organize to promote those values. It will be determined especially by how well we execute the nuts and bolts of election campaigns."

The book was praised by leading Democratic politicians such as Senator Dick Durbin, former Speaker Nancy Pelosi, Members of Congress Jamie Raskin, and organizers and strategists such as Heather Booth, Mike Lux of Democracy Partners, Patrick Gaspard of the Center for American Progress, Chuck Rocha of Solidarity Strategies, David Axelrod, Brad Woodhouse, Jim Messina, Geoff Garin.

=== Listen to Your Mother, Stand Up Straight: How Progressives Can Win ===
In 2007, he published Listen to Your Mother: Stand Up Straight: How Progressives Can Win, which outlined Creamer's framework for a new progressive political strategy. During his five months in the Federal Prison, Creamer used his time to write a book on his experiences as a progressive organizer and strategist, and to describe the strategies necessary to create a progressive movement and realign American politics.

In the book's introduction, Creamer described the book's premise that, "In order to win, Progressives need to proudly and self-confidently talk to Americans about our values and our vision of the future. We need to listen to our mothers and stand up straight."

The book described specific approaches to targeting and communications, building organizations, planning campaigns, progressive vision and values and creating structural change.

=== Political Commentary ===
Creamer is a published author and regularly contributes his political commentary in published articles. The following are a selected collection of Creamer's recent contributions to articles and blog posts as sole author, joint author, or contributor:

- "Why 2020 Is a Turnout Election". The American Prospect. March 5, 2020.
- "History Shows that Being "Moderate" Does Not Make a Candidate for President More Electable". Daily Kos.
- "Massive Facebook influence on public opinion makes its ad policy a serious election threat". USA TODAY.
- "Lessons from British Elections: Change Candidates Win — That's Why We Need Elizabeth Warren". Medium. December 14, 2019.
- "5 reasons why Elizabeth Warren has the best chance to beat Donald Trump". USA TODAY.

Creamer is also a regular contributor to HuffPost. The following is a selection of his most prominent contributions:

- "Opinion | America Isn't As Polarized As You Think It Is". HuffPost. December 31, 2018.
- "Opinion | Nancy Pelosi Should, And Will, Be Democrats' Speaker of the House". HuffPost. November 15, 2018.
- "Opinion | For Susan Collins, A Vote For Kavanaugh Would Be Political Suicide". HuffPost. September 7, 2018.
- "Opinion | Trump's Iran Decision Leaves Only 2 Likely Outcomes". HuffPost. May 9, 2018.
- "Opinion | Trump's Immigration Proposals Would Change The Identity Of America". HuffPost. February 13, 2018.
- "The GOP Won Its Tax Cut For The 1 Percent, But The Battle To Stop It Will Help Progressives Win The War". HuffPost. December 21, 2017.
- "The Greatest Threat To U.S. Security Is A Miscalculation Or Mistake". HuffPost. September 28, 2017.
- "Trump Runs The Country Like He's Driving A Bumper Car". HuffPost. September 8, 2017.
- "Are There Really Two Sides When It Comes to Political Violence in the U.S.?". HuffPost. August 16, 2017.
- "Congress Should Curb Trump's Ability To Launch A Nuclear First Strike". HuffPost. August 9, 2017.
- "We Need To Change The Federal Law To Avoid A Repeat Of The United Outrage". HuffPost. April 10, 2017.
- "The Next Battle To Defend Democratic Values In Europe Is In Serbia". HuffPost. March 28, 2017.
- "Three Real Reasons "TrumpCare" Failed". HuffPost. March 26, 2017.
- "Why The Anti-Trump Progressive Mobilization Could Mark A Major Inflection Point In American Political History". HuffPost. March 20, 2017.
- "This MLK Day, Let's Honor Dr. King's Principled Defiance". HuffPost. January 16, 2017.
- "What Democrats Must Do To Stop A Right-Wing Hijacking Of The Judiciary". HuffPost. January 2, 2017.
- "Progressives Can't Sugar-Coat This Disaster – So, What Now?". HuffPost. November 9, 2016.
- "Why A Vote For A Third Party Cannot Be An Option For Progressives". HuffPost. September 22, 2016.
- "Why Trump And The White Supremacist Alt-Right Are Threats To Our National Security". HuffPost. August 25, 2016.
- "Should America Entrust The Nuclear Launch Codes To Someone Who Is Unhinged?". HuffPost. August 3, 2016.
- "In Response to the Tragedy in Orlando – America Should Launch a New War – Against Intolerance and Hate Speech". HuffPost. June 12, 2016.
- "Big Business Uses Universities in Last Ditch Effort to Kill Fair Overtime Rules". HuffPost. April 25, 2016.
- "Can Fascism Triumph in America?". HuffPost. March 14, 2016.
- "GOP Obstruction of Obama Court Nomination – Radical, Without Precedent – With a Big Political Price". HuffPost. February 15, 2016.
- "Koch-Tied Group Asks High Court for Radical New Limits on Worker's Rights to Negotiate for Higher Wages". HuffPost. January 10, 2016.
- "The Real Attack on the Spirit of Christmas". HuffPost. December 25, 2015.
- "Warning: CEO Class' Next Big Attack on the Incomes of Ordinary Americans". HuffPost. December 11, 2015.

== Personal life ==
Creamer was previously married to Day Piercy. He married Jan Schakowsky in 1980. She has served as a member of the United States House of Representatives from Illinois's 9th congressional district since 1999. Schakowsky and Creamer have three children and six grandchildren. They live in Evanston, Illinois.
