= Faith and Politics Institute =

American religious organization

The Faith & Politics Institute
- Abbreviation: FPI
- Formation: March 22, 1991; 35 years ago
- Type: 501(c)(3)
- Tax ID no.: 52-1759052
- Legal status: Nonprofit organization
- Purpose: To cultivate mutual respect, moral reflection, increased understanding, and honest conversation among political leaders to advance productive discourse and constructive collaboration.
- Headquarters: 110 Maryland Avenue NE, Suite 504, Washington, D.C., U.S.
- Coordinates: 38.891402°N 77.005025°W
- President and Chief Executive Officer: Robert Traynham
- Chair: David Marventano
- Revenue: $2,007,894 (2019)
- Expenses: $1,618,836 (2019)
- Employees: 8 (2019)
- Volunteers: 20 (2019)
- Website: www.faithandpolitics.org

The Faith & Politics Institute is a 501(c)(3) nonprofit organization that serves members of Congress, national political leaders, and senior congressional staff by offering experiential pilgrimages, reflection groups, retreats and public forums. Through its nonpartisan programs, the group works to bridge racial, religious, and political divisions among elected officials, while promoting reflective and ethical leadership. Since 1991, over 300 members of Congress have taken part in efforts to "encourage collaborative and visionary leadership practices and foster healing, civility, and respect." Robert Traynham serves as its President & CEO.

Many Democratic and Republican Congressional Representatives work with the organization, including those on its Congressional Advisory Board; however, the late Representative John Lewis, a former leader of the civil rights movement in America, played a special role in its programs, including its annual Civil Rights Pilgrimage to Alabama.

== History ==
The institute was founded in 1991 to "provide bipartisan, bridge-building opportunities for political leaders to experience the spiritual power of conscience, courage, and compassion."

Plans for the group resulted from an early "reflection group" that included Rep. Glenn Poshard, Ms. Anne Bartley, Rev. Joe Eldridge, and Rev. Doug Tanner. Convinced of the importance of such opportunities for reflection, Tanner founded the Institute in 1991 "with the hope of providing opportunities for meaningful interactions and experiences among those who lead and serve our nation." Some of the institute's earliest efforts were linked to the "Common Ground" program, providing opportunities for staffers and members to help rebuild churches burned by arsonists in the mid-1990s.

In 1997, the organization expanded its programs when then-President Rev. Doug Tanner persuaded Representative Amo Houghton and Representative John Lewis (D-GA) to serve as the co-chairs of the group's Board of Directors. Their involvement brought in many additional members and leaders of Congress interested in dialogue across party, religious, racial, and ideological lines, creating a "spiritual community of men and women who seek a better way to do the people's business."

== Board and Advisors ==
The Board consists primarily of Government Relations professionals, and lawyers specializing in Government Regulation practices, representing such companies as American Airlines, American Bridge, American Values Network, Arent Fox, Aspen Institute, Association of American Publishers, Capital Concerts Inc., Coca-Cola Company, Covidien, Eleison LLC, Escambia Enterprises, Federal City Council, Fluor Corporation, Ford Motor Company, General Motors, Goldman Sachs Group, Jewish Funds for Justice, Lightbridge Corporation, Microsoft Corporation, Moore Consulting, National Association of Broadcasters, National Democratic Institute, Regions Financial, The First Group, The Memorial Foundation, TwinLogic Strategies, United Health Group, and Williams & Jensen, and others.

== Programs and activities ==
Activities within three broad areas include reflection groups, retreats, pilgrimages, and public forums. The weekly reflection groups and occasional retreats are important opportunities which seek to provide opportunities for members of Congress and other political leaders who work in the "fast-paced and charged atmosphere" of Washington, D.C., to "connect their role with their greater calling as human beings." The public forums include lectures by well-known speakers "whose lives reflect moral courage in the political arena." Past speakers include South African Archbishop Desmond Tutu, Thich Nhat Hanh, and authors and thought leaders like Bryan Stevenson, Sam Quinones, Arthur C. Brooks, and john a. powell. The pilgrimages allow members of both houses of congress, along with staff members and special guests, to take part in trips that provide information, inspiration, and opportunities for reflection on the lessons to be learned from past struggles, such as the civil rights movement. The annual pilgrimage to Montgomery, Birmingham, and Selma, Alabama includes a walk over the famous Edmund Pettus Bridge, which was led by Representative John Lewis, an early civil rights leader. Other special activities include:

- The Lewis-Houghton Leadership Awards: Recognizing leaders "who have exhibited qualities of conscience, courage and compassion in their roles as public servants."
- United States-South Africa Faith and Politics Initiative: In May 2003, The Faith & Politics Institute provided program conceptualization, planning, and coordination for the Congressional visit (CODEL) to South Africa, led by Reps. Houghton and Lewis. This visit provided an opportunity to compare lessons learned from America's civil rights movement and South Africa's fight against apartheid, and established links for future dialogue.
- Saint Joseph's Day Breakfast: An annual breakfast program, including a speaker and awards ceremony, on Saint Joseph's Day. Since Saint Joseph is recognized by many as the patron saint of the worker, the institute's St. Joseph's Day breakfast was founded "to raise awareness of the spiritual and moral issues that affect economic life in America."
- The Congressional Reception: Every two years, this reception acknowledges both those who have supported the institute's efforts and those who have been inspired by its programs.

The Faith & Politics Institute concluded its annual Congressional Pilgrimage to Alabama that was focused on Art, Architecture, Story & Song, featuring a visit to Montgomery's new Memorial for Peace and Justice and Legacy Museum. The Institute brought together over 40 Senators and Members of Congress in a bipartisan fashion to reflect on the civil rights struggle of the past. For the 50th Anniversary of Bloody Sunday, there were about 90 lawmakers in attendance during the 3-day weekend, which included addresses and appearances by President George W. Bush and President Barack Obama in Selma, Alabama.

=== Partnerships ===
Through partnership efforts with other organizations, the Institute extends its reach by co-sponsoring special events that its basic missions. Some groups, like the Fetzer Institute, partnered with the institute to support a wide variety of its programs, while others focus on specific events, including:

- Congressional Conversations on Race: It was co-sponsored with Search for Common Ground and founded on a belief in the need for the nation's leaders to recognize the spiritual nature of our nation's historic racial wounds, and work together toward healing.
- Civil Rights Heroes-Buried but not forgotten: In partnership with the Sewall-Belmont House, the District of Columbia, GLAAD, and the National Park Service, honored women and men buried in the Congressional Cemetery, who played key roles in advancing justice and equality for all. One of the men honored was Leonard Matlovich a Vietnam War veteran and Tech Sergeant, who had spoken out against discrimination against gay and lesbian service personnel.
- Muslims in America: The Faith & Politics Institute, along with the Newseum's Religious Freedom Education Project and Wesley Theological Seminary, hosted an evening of storytelling and honest dialogue about what it means to be Muslim-American in our contemporary context.
