= American Values Network =

US lobbying organization

American Values Network, Inc.
- Logo
- Founded: 2010
- Type: 501(c)(4)
- Tax ID no.: 26-4222057 (EIN)
- Location: Washington, D.C.
- Region served: United States
- Members: 5
- Key people: Burns Strider, President
- Revenue: $102,977 (2011)
- Website: americanvaluesnetwork.org

The American Values Network (AVN) is a progressive Christian lobbying organization in the United States, based in Washington, D.C. AVN was founded in 2010.

AVN is a politically active organization that works with other religious organizations to promote faith-based, compassionate policies on nuclear non-proliferation, the Arms Trade Treaty, climate change, government budgets, and universal health care. AVN says it promotes Christian values and counters hypocrisy on the Christian right.

== Overview ==
The President of AVN is Burns Strider, with Eric Sapp as the Executive Director and Rachel Johnson as Programs Director. AVN also sponsors a National Advisory Committee, whose members include Reverend Leah Daughtry, Don Fowler, Brenda Gullett, Kathleen Kennedy Townsend, and Gloria Williamson. It is affiliated with the American Values Network Educational Foundation and the Mississippi Values Network.

According to Strider, AVN was formed to "build a national organization committed to grass-roots building, networking, communicating, and activating a mainstream and authentic voice that would organize and speak out for progressive policy and issues from a faith and values perspective." AVN works alongside similar progressive faith groups such as Sojourners, Faith and Public Life, and Catholics in Alliance for the Common Good.

Organized as a 501(c)(4), AVN can participate in issue-based organizing, advertising, and lobbying and raises its funds through non-tax deductible donations.

== Issues ==
AVN has been active in the issues of nuclear non-proliferation, the Arms Trade Treaty, climate change, caring for the poor in government budgets, universal health care, and countering hypocrisy on the Christian right.

=== Nuclear Non-proliferation ===
AVN has criticized the American government for spending $700 billion on what they call "a nuclear weapons system designed for Cold War threats." Emphasizing the lack of a direct threat from Russia and the potentially wasted funds from the nuclear arms program, they have called on the government to either cut "pork barrel nuclear projects" or re-direct funds from some weapons, such as ballistic nuclear submarines, in order to support American troops with more effective technology.

In 2010, AVN worked to support the New START treaty, a bilateral treaty which reduced the number of strategic nuclear missile launchers in the United States and Russia by half. AVN's "Daisy Ad" highlights the risk of nuclear weapons. It accumulated tens of thousands of views on YouTube and garnered press coverage in NPR, Politico, Huffington Post, and The New York Times.

=== The Arms Trade Treaty ===
AVN is a strong supporter of the Arms Trade Treaty, the multilateral treaty negotiated under the auspices of the United Nations in 2012 that aims to regulate the international trade in conventional weapons. AVN created seven YouTube videos for Senators Jerry Moran (R-KS), Lamar Alexander (R-TN), Thad Cochran (R-MS), Michael Enzi (R-WY), James Inhofe (R-OK), Jeff Sessions (R-AL), and Max Baucus (D-MT), senators who have made statements against signing the Treaty in the past. The viral campaign has proved popular, with over 500,000 views in two days and widespread media coverage.

=== Climate ===
American Values Network has supported legislation on climate change and other environmental issues. In almost all of AVN's climate work, they have rallied members of the Christian and military communities to advocate for cleaner, smarter, and healthier environmental policy. In 2009, the organization to support the American Clean Energy and Security Act of 2009 which passed through the House but was defeated in the Senate. In this campaign, AVN sent emails to more than 650,00 people in Colorado, Arizona, and Arizona in which members of the military emphasized the need for comprehensive clean energy and climate legislation as a matter of national security.

In 2010, AVN released a series of ads on American cable news networks CNN, Fox News, and MSNBC that targeted Senator Lindsey Graham’s change in position on environmental legislative reform. Leading up to 2010, South Carolina Senator Lindsey Graham supported climate legislation but then flip-flopped on the issue. AVN's ads called out Senator Graham and highlighted the hypocrisy.

In 2013, AVN began an initiative called the Good Steward Campaign, which is a faith-based environmental organization focused primarily on college campus outreach. In the fall of 2013, The Good Steward Campaign organized on 30 college campuses in an attempt to get Christian students to think about and address climate change from a faith perspective. They also support fossil fuel divestment campaigns.

=== Budget ===
American Values Network roots their views on budget in the Biblical tradition of caring for the poor and vulnerable. They believe that the government has a responsibility to protect "the least of these" and that this call is too strong for Democratic leaders to ignore.

=== Countering the Right ===
AVN has run a handful campaigns with the goal of either correcting conservative misinformation or exposing conservative hypocrisy. These include their "Tea Party Jesus" and "Christians Must Choose: Ayn Rand or Jesus". In both campaigns AVN developed videos explaining disparity between what conservative Christians say they believe and the actions of people or groups that they politically support.

=== Healthcare ===
In 2009, the American Values Network worked with Sojourners to create a compelling ad about the danger and suffering that people without health insurance face each time they become sick or hurt. The ad was written about in Christianity Today as well as Huffington Post.
