= Faith and Action =

Christian organization

Faith and Action in the Nation's Capital, a name used by P&R Schenck Associates in Evangelism, Inc. (PRS), was a Christian evangelical outreach effort focused on federal officials of the United States. The group was based in Alexandria, Virginia and across from the Supreme Court of the United States in Washington, DC. The president of PRS was Rob Schenck.

== History and purpose ==
In August 1994, Schenck moved from Tonawanda (Buffalo area), New York to Washington D.C. to begin an outreach to policy makers. Initially known as Operation Save Our Nation, it became known as Faith and Action in the Nation's Capital. Schenck left with the intention of becoming pastor of the National Community Church on Capitol Hill and creating a network of pastors to lobby there.

Faith and Action's motto was "bringing the word of God to bear on the hearts and minds of those who make public policy in America." Schenck also stated that Faith and Action was "a Christian outreach whose mission is to reintroduce the Word of God into the public debate surrounding legislation and policy matters".

Termed "Operation Higher Court", during 1995 to 2018, Faith and Action targeted Supreme Court justices and clerks, as well as elected officials, government employees, and other government personnel to influence.

The programs under Faith and Action were taken over by Liberty Counsel in 2018 and then changed to Faith and Liberty. Schenck kept leading the organization P&R Schenck Associates in Evangelism and moved his headquarters within D.C.

=== Headquarters ===
Under Schenck's leadership, the organization was headquartered in the Honorable William J. Ostrowski House, named for the retired New York State Supreme Court judge and long-time supporter of the Schenck brothers’ efforts. The property included the Cora Bieber Garden, which was named for Lancaster, Pennsylvania's Cora Bieber in 2007.

=== Activities ===
In 2005 Faith and Action ministry joined other organizations to sponsor a Nativity Scene on Capitol Hill during the Christmas season.

One notable feature of the organization's office was a granite sculpture depicting the Ten Commandments displayed in the building's front garden. On Memorial Day in 2006, the monument was placed in the front of the building, readily noticeable from the street.

The Ten Commandments Project was a project of Faith and Action. One of its goals is to "restore the moral foundations of our American culture" through placing Ten Commandments displays in public buildings.

Created in 1995, Faith and Action’s Ten Commandments Project has given more than 400 plaques depicting the Ten Commandments to members of Congress and other highly placed officials, including former presidents Clinton and Bush. Special delegations of clergy and lay people made presentations during ceremonies in the recipients’ offices. The agenda included a short speech describing religion as the foundational basis of morality and law, a reading of the Commandments in their entirety, and prayers. The official was given an inscribed wooden plaque on which was mounted two stone polymer tablets containing a summary of the Ten Commandments. Recipients were urged to “display and obey” the Ten Commandments.
