= Brad Woodhouse =

American political activist

Brad Woodhouse is an American Democratic Party activist who currently serves as the president of Protect Our Care, a group seeking to protect the Affordable Care Act. He also serves as co-chair of the Health Care Voter campaign. He is the former president of the now-defunct liberal/progressive advocacy group Americans United for Change. He has also served as the president of Democratic super PACs American Bridge 21st Century and Correct the Record. He is the former communications director of the Democratic National Committee.

== Career ==
Woodhouse gained widespread notice as a spokesman for the Democratic Senatorial Campaign Committee during the early 2000s, and was casually named by a The Washington Post columnist as possibly "the most prolific e-mailer in politics." In 2005, Woodhouse left the DSCC to become communications director for Americans United to Protect Social Security. The group successfully fought President George W. Bush's efforts to establish private savings accounts as part of Social Security reform. With the Bush reform plan defeated, Woodhouse organized and became president of Americans United For Change. Woodhouse's group belongs to a coalition of progressive organizations called Change America Now, many of which are located in the same building in Washington at 1825 K Street, N.W. The leaders of those organizations frequently meet with aides to Democratic congressional leadership, to discuss strategy and upcoming votes.

In 2008, Woodhouse was given a senior position with the Democratic National Committee to help coordinate communications strategy for the upcoming general election. In 2009, Woodhouse formally became the Democratic National Committee's communications director. In 2013, Woodhouse left the Democratic National Committee to return as president of Americans United for Change. In 2014, Woodhouse became the president of American Bridge 21st Century. In 2015, Woodhouse became the President of Correct the Record, a super PAC supporting Hillary Clinton's 2016 presidential bid.

== 2009 Nobel Peace Prize controversy ==
In October 2009, President Barack Obama received the 2009 Nobel Peace Prize, an event widely reported as "surprising" to even the President and his advisers. Conservatives and others in the media ridiculed the selection process and the President. Criticism ranged from claims that Obama was undeserving, to the fact that he had been nominated only twelve days after his inauguration, to claims that the Nobel Peace Prize is anti-American. In an October 9, 2009 public statement, RNC Chairman Michael Steele issued a public statement which rhetorically asked what Obama achievement the Nobel Prize recognized.

Woodhouse, as Communications Director of the Democratic National Committee, responded:

The Republican Party has thrown in its lot with the terrorists — the Taliban and Hamas this morning — in criticizing the President for receiving the Nobel Peace prize — an award he did not seek but that is nonetheless an honor in which every American can take great pride — unless of course you are the Republican Party. The 2009 version of the Republican Party has no boundaries, has no shame and has proved that they will put politics above patriotism at every turn. It's no wonder only 20 percent of Americans admit to being Republicans anymore — it's an embarrassing label to claim.

The Republican National Committee (RNC) responded:

Like most Americans, the DNC can't think of one achievement that the president has accomplished, so they resort to their predictable response and standard playbook of demonizing those who disagree with them. . . . Now, when challenged to answer the question of what the president has accomplished, Democrats are lashing out calling Republicans terrorists. That type of political rhetoric is shameful.

== Personal life ==
He has two children including Brady Woodhouse. Woodhouse's brother is Dallas Woodhouse, former executive director of the North Carolina Republican Party.

Both brothers were featured in the 2014 documentary Woodhouse Divided by filmmaker Bryan Miller. They made a joint appearance, along with their mother on a surprise, unplanned call-in on the Democratic phone line, on C-SPAN's Washington Journal to promote the film.
