= Rob Schenck =

American Evangelical clergyman (born 1958)

- Born: Robert Leonard Schenck; 1958 (age 67–68); Montclair, New Jersey, U.S.
- Education: Elim Bible Institute (GrDip); Faith Evangelical Seminary (BA, MA); Faith International University & Seminary (DDiv)
- Spouse: Cheryl Smith
- Children: 2
- Relatives: Paul Schenck (brother)

Ecclesiastical career
- Church: Evangelical Methodist Church
- Ordained: 1982, New York District. Presbytery of the General Council of the Assemblies of God USA
- Website: www.revrobschenck.com

Robert Leonard Schenck (born 1958) is an American Evangelical clergyman who has ministered to elected and appointed officials in Washington, D.C., and serves as president of a nonprofit organization named for Dietrich Bonhoeffer. Schenck founded the organization Faith and Action in 1995 and led it until 2018. He is the subject of the Emmy Award-winning 2016 Abigail Disney documentary, The Armor of Light. Schenck stated that he was part of a group that paid Norma McCorvey (also known as Jane Roe from the landmark Roe v. Wade Supreme Court decision) to lie that she had changed her mind and turned against abortion. Once a prominent anti-abortion activist, Schenck has since repudiated this work and expressed support for the legality of abortion. In 2022, Schenck testified before the House Judiciary Committee concerning his allegation that a member of the Supreme Court leaked information about a pending case before the Court.

== Early years ==
Robert Lenard Schenck and his identical twin brother, Paul, were born in 1958 in Montclair, New Jersey, to Chaim "Henry Paul" Schenck and Marjorie (née Apgar) Schenck. Schenck was named after his father's older brother, who was a decorated B-17 bomber pilot in World War II and who lost his life in an air crash while serving in the Korean War. Schenck's father was born Jewish, raised in Manhattan, and attended a Reform Temple on Long Island, and Schenck's mother was born Catholic in Brooklyn, raised non-religious (she converted to Judaism when marrying his father), and grew up in Northern New Jersey. Schenck grew up in Grand Island, New York.

As a self-described "rebellious teen", Schenck became involved in risky behavior. Then in 1974, at the age of 16, the boys became acquainted with the son of a United Methodist minister serving the Trinity United Methodist Church in Grand Island. After Paul was introduced to a circle of young, religious Christians, he decided to become a Christian. Schenck accompanied his brother to prayer meetings and soon converted as well. Both brothers were baptized in the waters of the Niagara River, which forms the borders of Grand Island.

=== Family ===
While attending a youth prayer group in Grand Island, Schenck met Cheryl Smith, whom he married in 1977 after graduating from Grand Island High School. They have two children.

== Religious affiliations ==
From 2012 to 2016, Schenck served as chairman of the board of directors of the Evangelical Church Alliance (ECA). He was also chairman of ECA's Committee for Church and Society, the social witness arm of the alliance of ministers. In 2018, he became an advisor to the Office of the Secretary General of the World Evangelical Alliance (WEA).

== Ministry and activism ==
=== Faithwalk ===
In 1988, Schenck, an Assembly of God minister, took a long-distance walk to help people in Mexico who live and work in garbage dumps. While he visited Mexico City in 1982, he became aware of the plight of the "dump people". Schenck took a 2,000-mile (3,200 km) walk from Buffalo, NY, through eight states and crossed the border at Laredo, Texas. He hoped to raise $1 million to build a clinic and recruit volunteers willing to help provide medical, dental, and construction services.

=== Anti-abortion activism ===
In 1992, during Buffalo's large-scale abortion clinic demonstrations, Schenck grabbed national and worldwide attention when photos and videos were shot of him cradling a preserved human fetus, given the name "Tia" by a Black anti-abortion group, because the fetus was believed to be African-American. Much was written and aired about the event. In an opinion editorial in the June 15 Buffalo News, Schenck responded to the criticism. According to the op-ed, Schenck believed that pro-choice supporters ignored the truth in favor of ideology, and conversely, he believed that the fetus demonstrated the truth of his views. "Most have never seen an abortion, let alone the result of it. Baby Tia takes the argument out of the abstract and into reality."

In 1995, Schenck organized the first National Memorial for the Preborn and their Mothers and Fathers. This memorial is a religious service against abortion. This quickly became a prominent anti-abortion event held inside the US Capitol complex in Washington, DC. Originally a program of the National Clergy Council, the event has now been renamed the National Pro-Life Clergy Conference and is sponsored by the National Pro-Life Religious Council.

As of 2003, Schenck was a member of the National Pro-Life Religious Council. He participated in the events surrounding Terri Schiavo's death. Schenck traveled to Florida to try to prevent Schiavo from being allowed to die and publicly called for police to prevent the same. He was also a signatory of a letter to President George Bush and Florida Gov. Jeb Bush by national anti-abortion leaders. In 2005, Faith and Action served as a clearinghouse for donations to the family of Susan Torres, a brain-dead pregnant woman being kept on life support so that she could give birth.

Some time after 2010, Schenck changed his mind about abortion, stating that banning abortion would cause more harm than good, and opposed the effort to overturn Roe v. Wade. He concludes his May 31, 2019, Op-Ed for the New York Times. "No doubt, many of my former allies will call me a turncoat. I don't see it that way. I still believe that every abortion is a tragedy and that when a woman is pregnant, bringing the child into the world is always ideal. Reality, though, is different from fantasy. I wish every child could be fully nurtured and cared for and could experience all the wonderful possibilities that life can offer."

Schenck later stated that he was once part of a group that paid Norma McCorvey (1947–2017)—also known as Jane Roe in the landmark Roe v. Wade Supreme Court decision—to lie and say that she had changed her mind and joined anti-abortion movements. Having denounced the anti-abortion movement in 2019, Schenck stated in the 2020 documentary AKA Jane Roe that McCorvey was paid to pose as an anti-abortion rights activist and that "what we did with Norma was highly unethical".

=== Pastoring and preaching ===
In August 1994, in order to minister to national decision makers, Schenck and family moved to Washington, D.C. His first ministry there was to organize a new church. He attracted a core group of worshippers and created what became the National Community Church. He served as pastor for over a year until deciding to focus on government officials. In the beginning of 1996, when Mark Batterson took over as pastor, the church had around 30 people in attendance.

On Sunday, November 29, 2015, Schenck was a guest preacher at a Sunday worship service at the Washington National Cathedral. Schenck was invited to speak because of his opposition to gun violence and the documentary, The Armor of Light, focusing on him, which was screened at the church following the service.

Rev. Schenk used a ritual of blessing and prayer to seek divine guidance for the committee and the jurist during the confirmation hearings of Supreme Court Justices Samuel Alito and Sonia Sotomayor. A similar anointing and prayer ritual was used to seek God's guidance for President Barack Obama when Schenck anointed the doorway to the inauguration through which the president-elect would walk to the inaugural stage. This was part of a 19-day effort of prayer and fasting for Obama and his presidency. This was a continuation of the official prayer for the new president, which began with President George W. Bush's second term.

=== Ten Commandments Project ===
Created in 1995, his Ten Commandments Project has given over 400 plaques of the Ten Commandments to members of Congress and other highly placed officials, including former presidents Clinton and Bush. Special delegations made up of clergy and laypeople made the presentations during ceremonies held in the recipients' offices. The agenda included a short speech that describes religion as the foundational basis of morality and law, a reading of the Commandments in their entirety, and prayers. The official was given an inscribed wooden plaque on which are mounted two stone polymer tablets containing a summary of the Ten Commandments. Recipients were urged to "display and obey" the Ten Commandments.

=== Monument relocation from Ohio ===
In May 2009, Schenck joined Republican Rep. Jean Schmidt and other Ohio leaders to help relocate a Ten Commandments sculpture. The 3-foot by 3-foot granite sculpture, which weighs 850 pounds, is one of four monuments removed by federal court order from the fronts of public schools in rural Adams County, Ohio. The monument was placed in a prominent position on private property. The monument is identical to the one in front of the Faith and Action ministry center on Capitol Hill.

=== Judge Moore's Monument ===
In 2003, Schenck helped organize a supportive demonstration outside of the Alabama Judicial Building, seat of the state's Supreme Court, when Roy Moore was chief justice. By that time, Schenck had a long cooperative association with Moore who refused to relocate a granite monument to the historic basis of the law that included the Ten Commandments. The monument was eventually ordered moved by US District Judge Myron Thompson. When US marshals were dispatched to supervise the removal, Schenck and several others surrounded the monument, knelt, and started to pray. He was arrested and held for 5½ hours while the monument was moved. Schenck was interviewed on numerous television shows regarding the events.

=== Opposition to Burn-a-Koran Day ===
During September 2010, Schenck opposed the proposed burning of the Koran by pastor Terry Jones. In an interview with CBN on September 8, Schenck said this particular demonstration, while possibly warranted by common values and certainly permissible under the Constitution, violated Christian morality. He also stated objections to fallout in religious relations: "He's not just burning Korans; he's also burning bridges that we were trying to build for years with the Islamic community".

Schenck represented the National Clergy Council in speaking personally with Jones and asked Jones if, in a show of good faith, he would surrender custody of the Korans at the center of the controversy to Schenck's colleague, the Reverend Patrick Mahoney of the Christian Defense Coalition. Jones agreed to do so. As a condition of his cancellation, Jones requested the relocation of Park51. Schenck attempted to broker a meeting between Jones and Imam Faisal Rauf. However, a meeting never occurred, and Jones did not burn Korans on September 11.

=== Opposition to Houston sermons subpoena ===
On May 28, 2014, Houston, Texas, Mayor Annise Parker approved the controversial Houston Equal Rights Ordinance (HERO), which included a broad range of extenuating rights for the LGBT community without an exemption for religious organizations. Opponents of the ordinance collected signatures to put the bill to a public vote. On July 3, 2014, over 50,000 signatures were delivered to the city, which invalidated around 35,000 of the signatures and canceled the vote. On August 7, 2014, Houston citizens' groups filed suit to block implementation of HERO, which was put on hold.

In mid-2014, Mayor Parker's legal team subpoenaed sermons and sermon notes of local clergy members who had opposed the HERO ordinance. The subpoena required the clergy that "all speeches, presentations, or sermons related to HERO, the Petition, Mayor Parker, homosexuality, or gender identity prepared by, delivered by, revised by, or approved by you or in your possession" be turned over to the mayor's lawyers for review. This caused a backlash around the country from religious freedom advocates as well as concerned citizens. As president of the National Clergy Council, Schenck (accompanied by other pastors) met with Mayor Parker to request that her legal order be withdrawn. Shortly thereafter, the mayor instructed her attorneys to withdraw the subpoenas.

=== The Armor of Light ===
In 2015, Schenck was the subject of the critically acclaimed documentary, The Armor of Light. In this film, directed by Abigail Disney, Schenck discusses the topic of guns and the anti-abortion Christian community's response to America's gun culture and gun violence. The movie was called a "vital colloquy on whether we shape our lives through fear or with love" by the Los Angeles Times. In November 2015, Schenck preached at morning worship at the Washington National Cathedral, where the documentary was screened following the service.

=== The Dietrich Bonhoeffer Institute ===
As of 2021, Schenck served as president of a nonprofit organization known as The Dietrich Bonhoeffer Institute. In 2019, the organization paid Schenck $147,000 from a budget of $422,612. In 2022, the budget decreased to $188,487, and Schenck received $56,665 in compensation.

=== Faith and Action Supreme Court influence campaign ===
Schenck founded a nonprofit organization named Faith and Action. He headed the group from 1995 to 2018.

On December 8, 2022, the House Committee on the Judiciary convened a hearing, "Undue Influence: Operation Higher Court and Politicking at SCOTUS", to determine covert activity and influence on members of the U.S. Supreme Court by Faith and Action (now Faith and Liberty) under Schenck's leadership. Schenck was called to testify. Schenck had previously alleged that Justice Samuel Alito had leaked news about an upcoming Supreme Court decision in 2014. (Alito has denied the allegation.) Schenck had also claimed to have undertaken a secret campaign to influence conservative Supreme Court justices for over a decade. At the hearing, Rep. Jim Jordan aggressively questioned Schenck's credibility, while Rep. Tom McClintock called him "'a pathetic grifter'".
