= American Family Voices =

Political advocacy organization (2000-)

- Formation: 2000
- President: Mike Lux
- Website: americanfamilyvoices.org

American Family Voices (AFV) is an American political advocacy organization affiliated with the progressive movement. Founded in 2000, which describes itself as pursuing "civil rights, environmental, women’s rights, consumer advocacy and health care" causes.

== Projects and initiatives ==
In 2020, The New York Times reported on a project by the group that aims to revitalize the Democratic Party's electoral fortunes in rural America. The report identified a number of counties in the Upper Midwest region that the Democratic Party was advised to invest in.

One of AFV's initiatives, "AirbnbWatch," declares its purpose as being "to bring attention to illegal hotel operations in residential areas". The initiative is funded by the American Hotel and Lodging Association, a trade association representing the hotel industry.

=== Funding ===
The organization does not disclose its funding sources, however, a 2016 investigation by the Center for Public Integrity reported that it received significant donations from "large unions, environmental interests and a major corporate retail lobbying group".
